= Kinner Sportster =

Sportster

General information
- Type: Light monoplane
- Manufacturer: Kinner Airplane & Motor Corporation
- Designer: Max B. Harlow

History
- First flight: 1932

The Kinner Sportster was a 1930s American light monoplane built by Kinner Airplane & Motor Corporation.

== Design and development ==
The Kinner Airplane & Motor Corporation had been producing radial engines since 1919 decided to enter the light aircraft market. The first design was a single-seat low-wing monoplane the Kinner Sportster K with a fixed tailwheel landing gear. Further versions followed with different engines. The strut-braced, low-wing, open cockpit, conventional gear aircraft featured folding wings. In 1933, an improved version the Sportwing B-2 was introduced. An enlarged four-seat version was produced in 1935 as the Kinner Envoy. Kinner became bankrupt in 1937 and rights to the Sportster were acquired by the Timm Aircraft Company. The Sportster was also produced after the Bankruptcy by Security-National Corp as the Security S-1 Airster

== Variants ==
K Sportster
Powered by a 100 hp (75 kW) Kinner K-5 engine.
K-5 Sportster
B Sportster
Powered by a 125 hp (93 kW) Kinner B-5 engine.
B-1 Sportster
Powered by a 125 hp (93 kW) Kinner B-5 engine.
B-2R Sportster
B-2 Sportsters modified by Timm aircraft, with 160 hp (119 kW) Kinner R-5 engines, after Kinners bankruptcy;also marketed as the Timm 160.
Timm 160
Sportsaters modified by the Timm Aircraft Company powered by 160 hp (119 kW) Kinner R-5 engines.
Security S-1 Airster
Production of the re-named Sportster by Security-National Corp, formed by Kinner after the original company's bankruptcy

== Specifications (B-1 Sportster) ==
Data from

General characteristics

- Crew: 1
- Capacity: 1
- Length: 24 ft 2 in (7.37 m)
- Wingspan: 39 ft 0 in (11.89 m)
- Fuel capacity: 24 US gal (20 imp gal; 91 L)
- Load: 603 lb (274 kg)
- Powerplant: 1 × Kinner B-5 5-cyl. air-cooled radial piston engine, 125 hp (93 kW)

Performance

- Maximum speed: 112 mph (180 km/h, 97 kn)
- Cruise speed: 98 mph (158 km/h, 85 kn)
- Stall speed: 40 mph (64 km/h, 35 kn)
- Range: 440 mi (710 km, 380 nmi)
- Service ceiling: 15,000 ft (4,600 m)
