= Stearman Cloudboy =

1930s American trainer aircraft

Model 6 Cloudboy
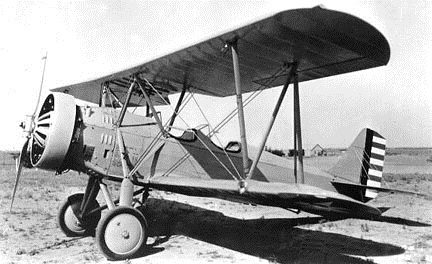
- The YBT-3

General information
- Type: Training biplane
- Manufacturer: Stearman Aircraft Company
- Primary user: United States Army Air Corps
- Number built: 7

History
- Manufactured: 1930-1931
- First flight: 1931

The Stearman Model 6 Cloudboy was a 1930s American training biplane designed and built by the Stearman Aircraft Company of Wichita, Kansas.

== History ==
The Cloudboy was designed as a commercial or military trainer. Due to economic pressure during the Great Depression, only a few aircraft were built. Three civil models were built, followed by four similar aircraft for evaluation by the United States Army Air Corps. Designated YPT-9 by the Army, it failed to gain any orders. All models went through a number of engine changes (resulting in new designations for both the military and civil aircraft).

== Variants ==
Model 6L Stearman Cloudboy (YBT-9B), N787H

Model 6A Cloudboy
Initial civil production with a 165 hp (123 kW) Wright J-6 Whirlwind 5 engine, three built.
Model 6C Cloudboy
Re-engined with a 300 hp (220 kW) Wright J-6-9 Whirlwind (R-975-1), also designated YBT-3.
Model 6D Cloudboy
Re-engined with a 300 hp (220 kW) Pratt & Whitney Wasp Junior, also designated YBT-5
Model 6F Cloudboy
Re-engined with a 165 hp (123 kW) Continental A70 engine, also designated YBT-9A.
Model 6H Cloudboy
Re-engined with a 170 hp (130 kW) Kinner YR-720A engine, also designated YBT-9C.
Model 6L Cloudboy
Re-engined with a 200 hp (150 kW) Lycoming R-680-3 engine, also designated YBT-9B

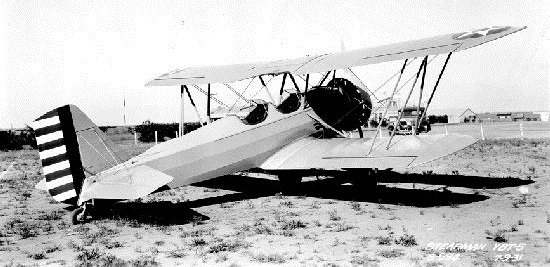
YBT-5

Model 6P Cloudboy
One 6F re-engined with 1 220 hp (160 kW) Wright J-5 engine
YPT-9
Military production variant of the Model 6A with a 165 hp (123 kW) Wright J-6 Whirlwind 5 engine, four built (one converted to YPT-9A, one to YPT-9B, one to YBT-3 and one YBT-5).
YPT-9A
One YPT-9 re-engined with a 165 hp (123 kW) Continental A70 (YR-545-1) engine, later converted to YPT-9B.
YPT-9B
One YPT-9 and one YPT-9A re-engined with a 200 hp (150 kW) Lycoming R-680-3 engine.
YPT-9C
YBT-3 re-engined with a 170 hp (130 kW) Kinner YR-720A engine.
YBT-3
One YPT-9 re-engined with a 300 hp (220 kW) Wright J-6-9 Whirlwind, later converted to a YPT-9C.
YBT-5
One YPT-9 re-engined with a 300 hp (220 kW) Pratt & Whitney R-985-1 Wasp Junior engine.
XPT-943
A primary trainer derived from the 6A for evaluation at Wright Field. Formed the origins of the Stearman NS and PT-13 for the US Navy and USAAC respectively.
X-70
Alternative company designation for the XPT-943.

== Operators ==
United States
United States Army Air Corps

== Surviving aircraft ==
- 6002 – 6L airworthy at the Candler Field Museum in Williamson, Georgia.
- 6003 – 6L airworthy at the Western Antique Aeroplane & Automobile Museum in Hood River, Oregon. It was previously owned by the Golden Wings Flying Museum.
- 6004 – YPT-9B on display at the Yanks Air Museum in Chino, California. It was previously owned by the Boeing School of Aeronautics and was acquired by the museum in 1987.
- 6010 – 6C airworthy with Robert Lock of Lakeland, Florida.

== Specifications (YPT-9B) ==
Data from United States Military Aircraft since 1909

General characteristics

- Crew: 2
- Length: 24 ft 8 in (7.52 m)
- Wingspan: 32 ft 0 in (9.76 m)
- Height: 9 ft 7 in (2.92 m)
- Wing area: 272 sq ft (25.3 m^{2})
- Gross weight: 2,814 lb (1,279 kg)
- Powerplant: 1 × Lycoming R-680-3 , 200 hp (149 kW)

Performance

- Maximum speed: 135 mph (217 km/h, 117 kn)
- Range: 490 mi (789 km, 430 nmi)
- Service ceiling: 17,000 ft (5,183 m)
- Rate of climb: 1,050 ft/min (5.3 m/s)

== See also ==
Related lists

- List of military aircraft of the United States
