= States Super Monoplane =

1930s American light aircraft

Super Monoplane

General information
- Type: Two seat civil light aircraft
- National origin: U.S.
- Manufacturer: States Aircraft Co,.Chicago
- Designer: Frederick Jolly
- Number built: at least 11

History
- First flight: 1930

The States Super Monoplane was a tandem two seat, civil sport and trainer aircraft built in small numbers at the start of the U.S. Great Depression.

== Design and development ==
The Super Monoplane was aimed at both training clubs and private owners. It was a parasol aircraft with rectangular plan wings supported by a long V-strut on each side from the lower fuselage and by short cabane struts centrally. Frise ailerons were fitted to retain lateral control in a stall.

It was powered by versions of the five cylinder Kinner radial engine. The B-3 (the first, 1930 version of the aircraft) had a Kinner K-5 with a maximum power of 100 hp (75 kW) and the 1930 B-4 a 125 hp (93 kW) Kinner B-5. These were neatly cowled with only the tops of the cylinders and stub exhausts exposed. There were two open cockpits in tandem, the forward one under the centre of the wing and the other, close behind but raised, was under its trailing edge where a deep, rounded cut-out improved the field of view. Though both cockpits could have flight controls, those in the forward one were removable and the instrumentation was in the rear. A large, lockable compartment was provided for luggage.

Behind the engine the fuselage was flat-sided and tapered to a conventional tail with a triangular fin and rounded rudder. Its cockpit-adjustable tailplane was mounted on top of the fuselage and wire-braced to the fin. The elevators had a deep cut-out for rudder movement. The Super Monoplane's landing gear was also conventional but up to date, with each hub-sprung wheel on a pair of V-struts from the lower fuselage longerons. A long oleo strut to the upper fuselage acted as a shock absorber. There was a long tailskid.

The date of the Super Monoplane's first flight is not known but it was ATC-certificated by the autumn of 1930. Most small aircraft manufacturers struggled to survive in the Great Depression and States closed in 1937, having built about six of each of its two variants.

== Variants ==
Data from Aerofiles

B-3
1930 model with 100 hp (75 kW) Kinner K-5, at least six built
B-4
1932 model with 125 hp (93 kW) Kinner B-5, about five built.

== Specifications (B-3) ==
Data from Aero Digest, October 1930

General characteristics

- Crew: one
- Capacity: plus one student or passenger
- Length: 23 ft (7.0 m)
- Wingspan: 32 ft (9.8 m)
- Height: 8 ft (2.4 m)
- Aspect ratio: 5.33
- Empty weight: 1,083 lb (491 kg)
- Gross weight: 1,635 lb (742 kg)
- Fuel capacity: 24 US gal (20 imp gal; 91 L)
- Powerplant: 1 × Kinner K-5 five cylinder radial, 70–100 hp (52–75 kW)
- Propellers: 2-bladed

Performance

- Maximum speed: 105 mph (169 km/h, 91 kn)
- Cruise speed: 90 mph (140 km/h, 78 kn)
- Landing speed: 35 mph (56 km/h; 30 kn)
- Endurance: 4.5 hr
- Service ceiling: 14,000 ft (4,300 m)
- Rate of climb: 900 ft/min (4.6 m/s)
