= Bach Super Transport =

Four-engine transport aircraft design

Super Transport
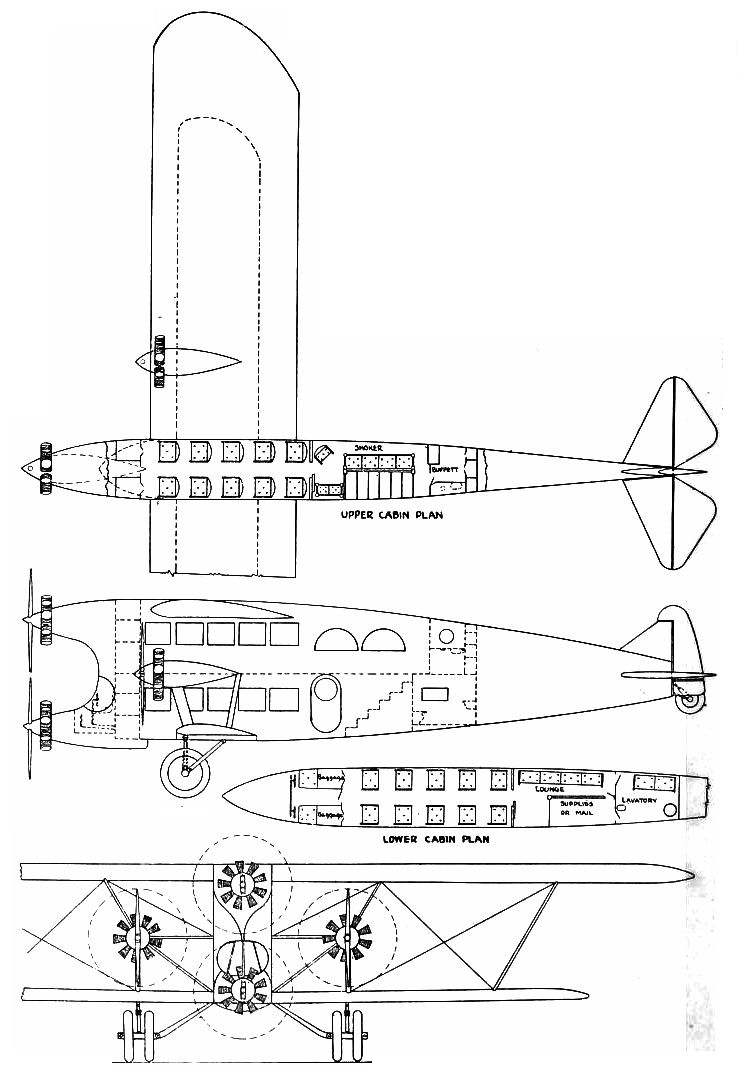
- Bach Super Transport 3-view drawing from Aero Digest September 1928

General information
- Type: Airliner
- National origin: United States
- Manufacturer: Bach Aircraft
- Designer: L. Morton Bach
- Status: Concept only

History
- Developed from: Bach Air Yacht

The Bach "Super Transport" was a design for a four-engined transport aircraft that was never built.

== Design and development ==
The Bach Aircraft Company was founded by L. Morton Bach in 1927. Following in the footsteps of Fokker with the Fokker F.VII Trimotor, and the metal Ford Trimotor, the Bach Air Yacht was developed as a commercial trimotor transport. In 1928, Bach filed a patent for a four-engined design. The aircraft was similar to the trimotor as a metal-covered, strut-braced biplane, with conventional landing gear. It also featured semi-circular windows like the Stout 2-AT Pullman. The aircraft design featured an unusual modification of the trimotor arrangement with two nose-mounted engines stacked above each other with cockpit windows between them. The fuselage carried a double-decker seating arrangement. The Bach company was reorganized and dissolved during the Great Depression without any examples built.

== Specifications (Super Transport estimated) ==
Data from Patent 79061, Aerofiles Ba to Bl

General characteristics

- Crew: 2
- Capacity: 23 cabin crew and passengers
- Wingspan: 85 ft (26 m)
- Powerplant: 4 × Pratt & Whitney R-1340 Wasp 9-cylinder air-cooled radial piston engines, 410 hp (310 kW) each
- Propellers: 2-bladed fixed pitch propellers

Performance

- Maximum speed: 132 kn (152 mph, 245 km/h)
- Cruise speed: 100 kn (120 mph, 190 km/h)
- Range: 700 nmi (800 mi, 1,300 km)

== See also ==
Related development

- Bach Air Yacht

Aircraft of comparable role, configuration, and era

- Stout 3-AT
