= Peach State Aerodrome =

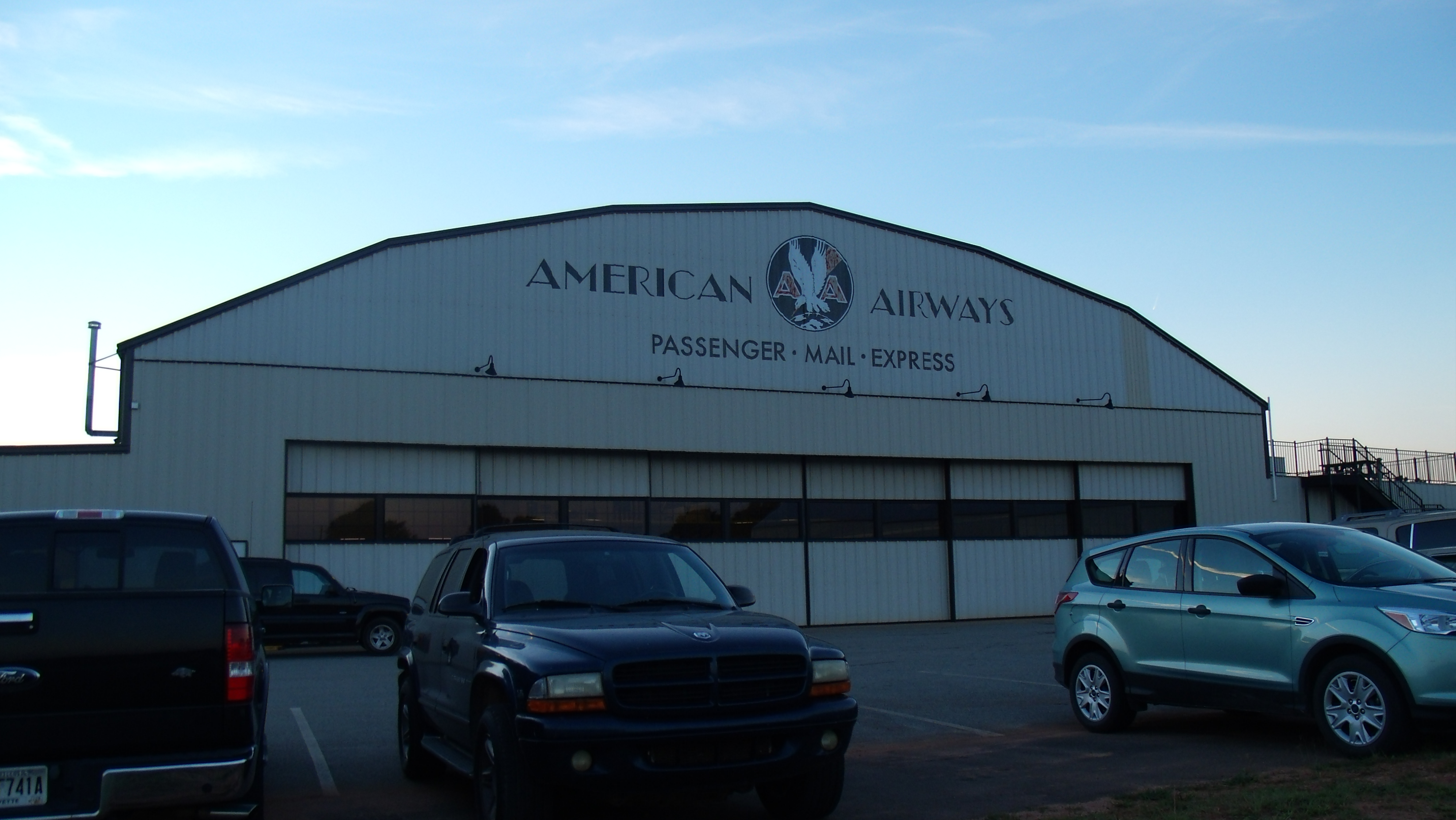
- American Airways hangar
- IATA: none; ICAO: none; FAA LID: GA2

Summary
- Airport type: Public
- Operator: Peachstate Air Park Inc.
- Location: Williamson, Georgia, U.S.
- Elevation AMSL: 926 ft / 282 m
- Coordinates: 33°11′00″N 84°22′18″W
- Interactive map of Peach State Aerodrome

Runways
Direction	Length		Surface
Direction	ft	m	Surface
13/31	2,750	732	Sod

Peach State Aerodrome (FAA LID: GA2) is a public grass strip located 1 mile (1.6 km) west of Williamson, Georgia, in the United States. Peach State Aerodrome is located in Pike County, 27 nautical miles (50 km) south of Hartsfield-Jackson Atlanta International Airport.

At last report, there were twenty-one aircraft based at Peach State Aerodrome, including one multi-engine. Average operations per week over one 12-month period totaled sixty-seven, 79% local flights and 21% transient flights.

In addition to hosting various annual fly-in events oriented towards vintage and unusual aircraft, Peach State Aerodrome serves as home to the Barnstormer's Grill restaurant, popular with transient pilots and local residents. Adjoining the restaurant is the former Candler Field Museum, which was home to 1920s era aircraft, vehicles, and memorabilia.

Peach State Aerodrome also hosts EAA Chapter 468, the Candler Field Flying Club, and the Barnstormer's Workshop. Adjacent to the airport is Peach State Airpark, a subdivision for pilots who share interest in experimental, warbird or antique aircraft.

== History ==
Two Waco biplanes outside Barnstormer's Grill

In 1967, Carl Hoffman bought a peach tree orchard on the current location of Alexander Memorial Airport, with the intent of building an airfield from which he could easily reach Atlanta. By mid-1968, the field had been finished, and Antique Acres (original name of airfield) could soon support light aircraft with a 3,350 foot long grass runway.

In 1969, the runway was modified to accommodate gliders as well. Hoffman sold the airport operations in 1973, and, after the buyer ran into financial difficulties, re-acquired the airfield. Hoffman finally sold Antique Acres a short time afterwards.

Pike County tax records show that Bobby Tisdale bought the airport March 14, 1979, and later sold it to Lynford and Brenda Sullivan on August 3, 1990. The Sullivans sold Peach State to David Harwell on March 31, 1994, and he held it until the April 7, 2005 sale to Ronald Alexander (Peach State Airport, LLC.).

Peach State Airport was the original home for the Atlanta Soaring Club, founded October 4, 1986. In May 1988, the ASC moved to Etowah Bend Airport due to "increasing uncertainty of additional (and unworkable) air space restrictions around Atlanta's Hartsfield Airport, the proposed Mode C requirements, the shift of the demographics of potential club members more further north and the impending sale of Peach State by Bob Tisdale...."

Following the death of airport owner Ron Alexander, Peach State Airport was re-named Alexander Memorial Airport. The change was announced during a March 2017 ceremony held in his honor.

In 2020, under the ownership of Keven and Linda Sasser, the airport name was changed back to Peach State Aerodrome. The Sassers, along with other airport community members, knew Ron Alexander would have never entertained the thought of changing the airport name due to his passing.

== Candler Field Museum ==
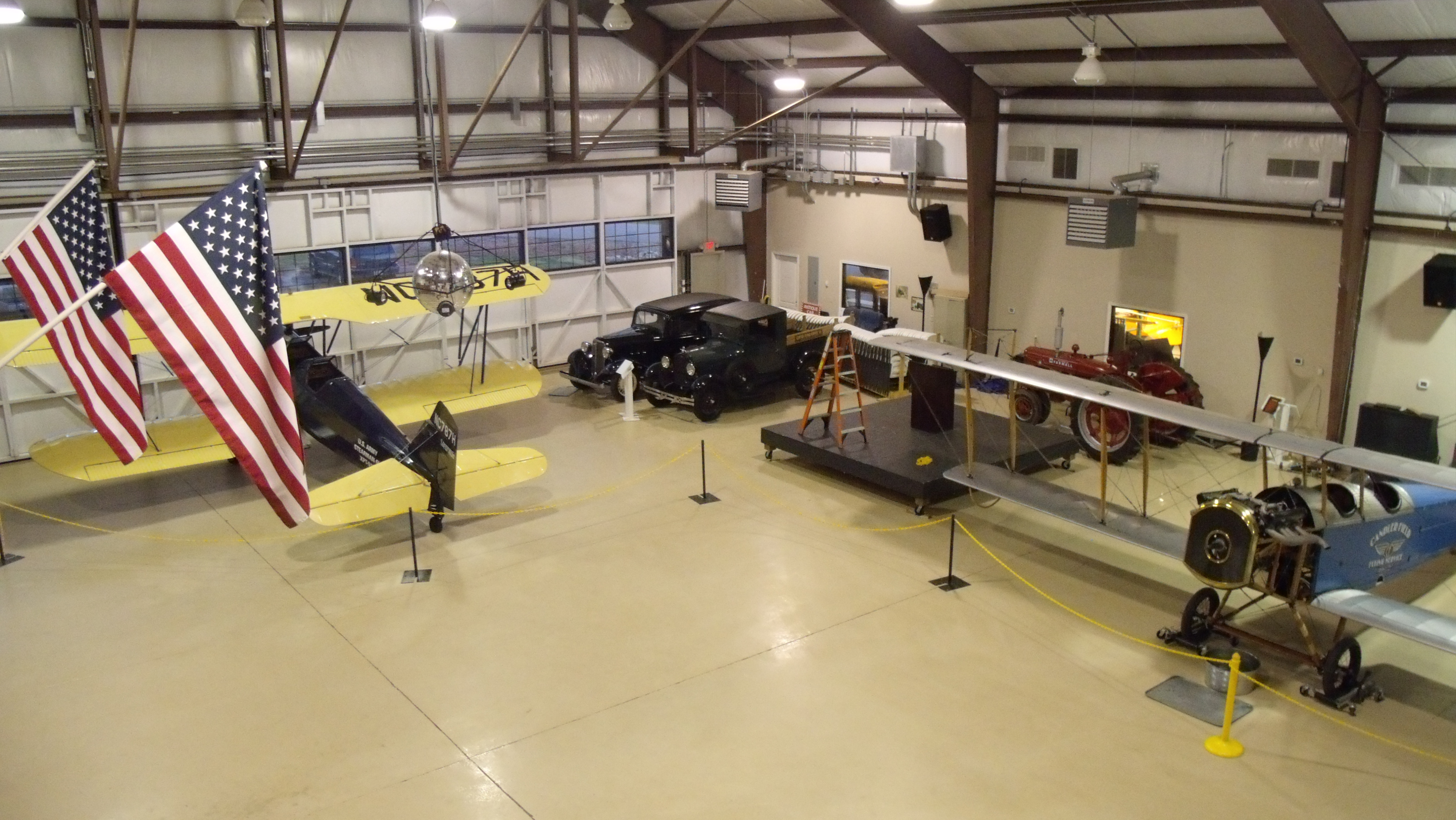
View from museum balcony

Founded in March, 2005, the non-profit Candler Field Museum was a dedicated recreation of the Hartsfield-Jackson Atlanta International Airport, as it appeared in the late 1920s and early 1930s, then known as Candler Field.

The Museum sponsored several events throughout the year, including the Vintage Day Fly-In, held each June. Most events emphasized aircraft and culture of the 1920s, and Vintage Day attracts a wide variety of old and unusual aircraft.

The museum closed in 2021.

== See also ==
- List of airports in Georgia (U.S. state)
