= Lincoln AP =

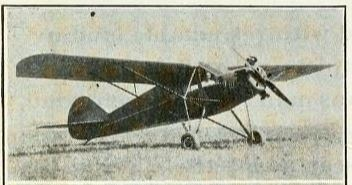

General information
- Type: General purpose three-seater
- National origin: United States
- Manufacturer: Lincoln Aircraft Co.
- Number built: 4

History
- First flight: 1930

The Lincoln AP was a U.S., single engine, high wing, general purpose (AP stood for All-Purpose) civil cabin aircraft first flown in 1930. Only four were built.

== Design and development ==
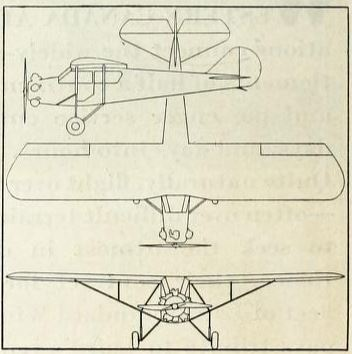

The Lincoln AP, first flown in 1930, was a high wing, single-engine cabin monoplane with seats for three. The purchaser could choose between two five cylinder Kinner radial engines of different powers but the two models were otherwise similar. It was of mixed construction but entirely fabric covered. The fuselage, tail and wing, apart from its twin spruce spars, had welded Cr/Mo steel tube structures.

The wing was rectangular in plan out to angled, rounded tips, though centrally there was a gentle reduction in chord to improve the pilot's upward field of view. Parallel chord ailerons filled about half the trailing edge. The wings were braced to the fuselage with a parallel pair of struts between spars and lower longerons on each side. At the rear both fin and tailplane had blunted triangular profile and plans. The fin carried a near semi-circular unbalanced rudder which reached down to the keel and the tailplane, mounted on top of the fuselage and inflight adjustable for trim, carried parallel chord elevators separated by cut-outs for rudder movement.

Behind the engine, mounted with cylinders exposed for cooling, the fuselage was rectangular in cross-section. The AP's cabin was largely under the wing but placed the pilot at the leading edge ahead of the two passengers sitting side-by-side; each of the three bucket seats contained a parachute space. Access was via a side door.

The AP had fixed, tailskid landing gear with the main wheels on split axles, each mounted together with a rear drag strut on the lower fuselage longerons. Vertical shock absorbing oleo struts were mounted on the forward wing struts at points strengthened with struts to both to the upper and lower longerons.

Only four APs were built, including the prototype. One was powered by a 100 hp (75 kW) Kinner K-5 and the other three by 125 hp (93 kW) Kinner B-5s.

Despite a service ceiling of 16,150 ft (4,920 m) Lincoln test pilot Malcolm S. Smith, piloting a B-5 equipped to set a light aircraft altitude record, claimed to have reached about 28,000 ft (8,500 m). Both its altimeters failed at 21,000 ft (6,400 m).

== Variants ==
AP-B5
125 hp (93 kW) Kinner B-5
AP-K5
100 hp (75 kW) Kinner K-5

== Specifications (Kinner B-5 engine) ==
Data from Aero Digest, April 1931

General characteristics

- Crew: one
- Capacity: two passengers
- Length: 26 ft (7.9 m)
- Wingspan: 37 ft (11 m)
- Height: 8 ft 3 in (2.51 m)
- Wing area: 206.4 sq ft (19.18 m^{2})
- Airfoil: U.S. 35 B
- Empty weight: 1,352 lb (613 kg)
- Gross weight: 2,180 lb (989 kg)
- Fuel capacity: 38 US gal (32 imp gal)
- Powerplant: 1 × Kinner B-5 five cylinder radial, 125 hp (93 kW)
- Propellers: 2-bladed Fahlin, wood or metal

Performance

- Maximum speed: 128 mph (206 km/h, 111 kn)
- Cruise speed: 103 mph (166 km/h, 90 kn)
- Landing speed: 48 mph (77 km/h; 42 kn)
- Range: 450 mi (720 km, 390 nmi)
- Service ceiling: 16,150 ft (4,920 m)
- Rate of climb: 830 ft/min (4.2 m/s)
