= Kinner Playboy =

Playboy
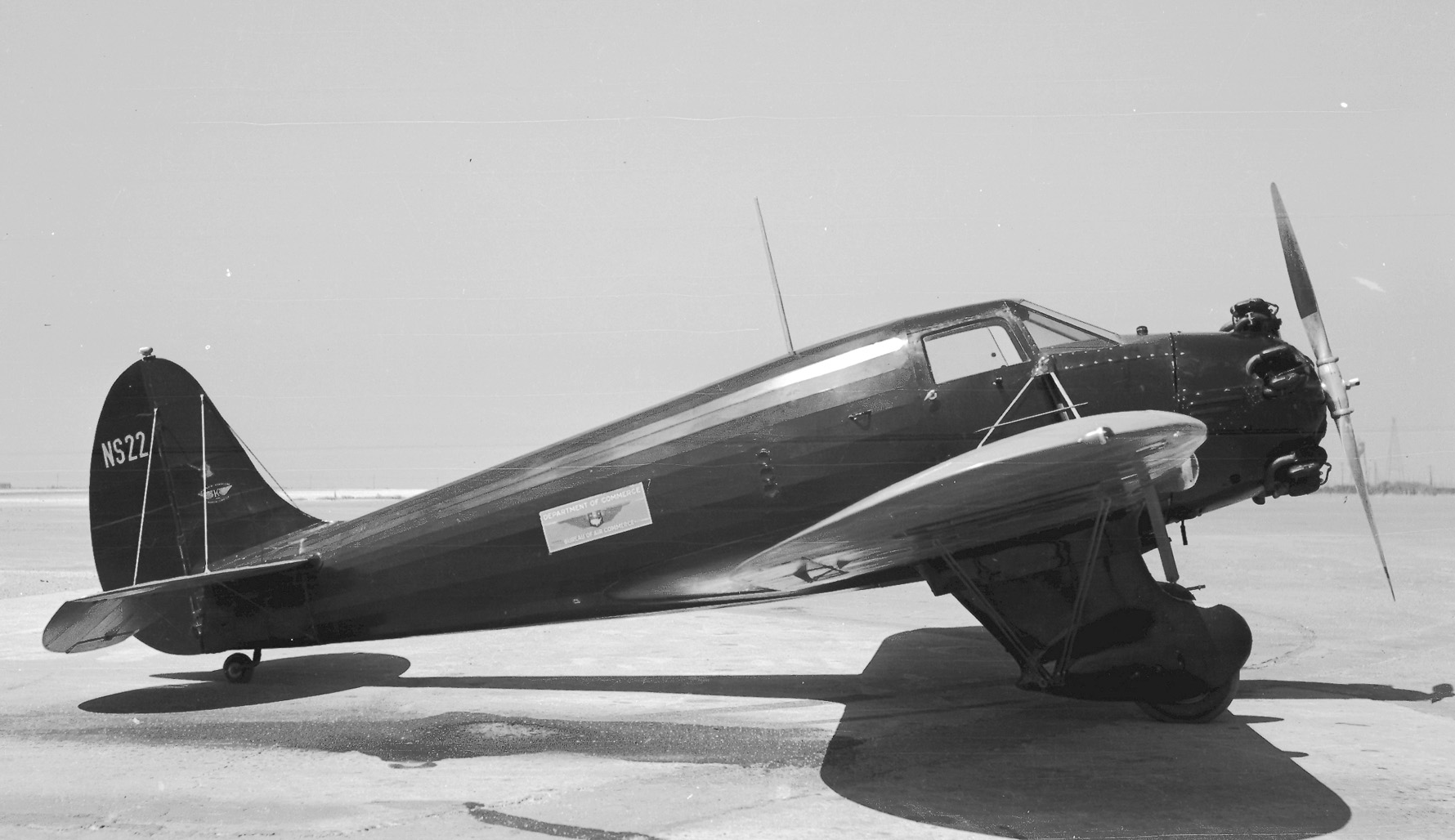

General information
- Type: Sporting monoplane
- Manufacturer: Kinner Airplane & Motor Corporation
- Designer: Max B. Harlow
- Number built: 13

History
- First flight: 1933

The Kinner R Playboy was a 1930s American two-seat sporting monoplane built by Kinner Airplane & Motor Corporation.

== Design and development ==
The Playboy was a two-seat (side-by-side) sporting monoplane designed by Max B. Harlow and built by the Kinner Airplane & Motor Corporation in 1933. Originally built with an enclosed cockpit the sole R was modified to have an open cockpit as the Kinner R-1 Playboy. Production aircraft were designated Kinner R-5 Playboy. one of the 12 built being supplied to the China Aviation Assn (Shanghai), fitted with a 210 hp (157 kW) Kinner C-5 engine. The Center for Freedom and Flight in Vacaville, California has one of the two remaining aircraft on display.

== Variants ==
Data from:

Kinner R Playboy
The original closed cockpit version of the Playboy.
Kinner R-1 Playboy
The R modified to have an open cockpit.
Kinner R-5 Playboy
The production version with enclosed cockpit, 12 aircraft were built.

== Specifications (R-5) ==
Data from

General characteristics

- Crew: 2
- Length: 24 ft 3 in (7.39 m)
- Wingspan: 32 ft 9 in (9.98 m)
- Height: 7 ft 9 in (2.36 m)
- Wing area: 189 sq ft (17.6 m^{2})
- Airfoil: Clark Y
- Empty weight: 1,461 lb (663 kg)
- Gross weight: 2,270 lb (1,030 kg)
- Fuel capacity: 48 US gal (40 imp gal; 180 L)
- Powerplant: 1 × Kinner R-5 (Series 2) 5-cylinder air-cooled radial piston engine, 160 hp (120 kW)
- Propellers: 2-bladed metal propeller

Performance

- Maximum speed: 138 mph (222 km/h, 120 kn) at sea level
- Cruise speed: 125 mph (201 km/h, 109 kn)
- Stall speed: 55 mph (89 km/h, 48 kn) (landing speed)
- Range: 600 mi (970 km, 520 nmi)
- Service ceiling: 14,000 ft (4,300 m)
- Rate of climb: 800 ft/min (4.1 m/s)
