= Timm Aerocraft 2AS =

Aerocraft 2AS
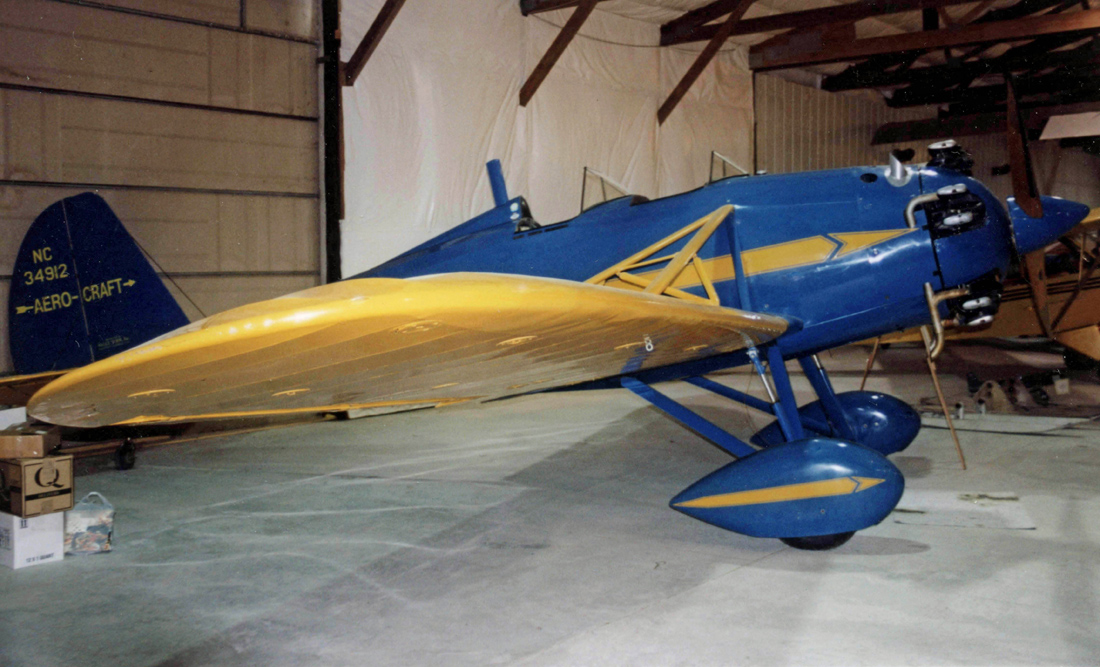
- The sole surviving Timm Aerocraft 2AS preserved at the Iowa Aviation Museum at Greenfield, Iowa in 2006

General information
- Type: Primary training aircraft
- National origin: United States
- Manufacturer: Wally Timm Company, Aetna Aircraft Corp
- Status: one surviving aircraft
- Number built: 6

History
- First flight: 1941
- Developed from: Kinner Sportwing

The Aerocraft 2AS is a tandem-seat training aircraft developed from the Kinner Sportwing.

== Design and development ==
Timm formed the Wally Timm Company in Glendale, California. He purchased the rights to the Kinner Sportwing, a side-by-side monoplane training aircraft and modified it as a tandem-seat trainer to compete for the Civilian Pilot Training Program build-up prior to World War II. The prototype received ATC# 733 on January 1, 1941. The Timm Aerocraft 2AS lost out to a Fairchild design. The design was sold to Aetna Aircraft, with only six examples produced.

The Aerocraft is a conventional landing gear equipped, strut-braced, low-winged monoplane with open cockpit tandem seating and a Kinner R-5 radial engine. The fuselage is welded steel tubing with aircraft fabric covering. The wing uses wooden spars and ribs with fabric covering.

== Operational history ==
The prototype aircraft was test flown by longtime Timm associate Frank Clarke in 1941.

An Aetna 2AS won the Antique Champion award at the 1985 EAA Airshow at Oshkosh, Wisconsin.

The sole surviving Timm 2AS, the fourth to be built, is preserved in an airworthy condition at the Iowa Aviation Museum and Hall of Fame located at Greenfield, Iowa.

== Specifications (Timm Aerocraft 2AS) ==
Data from Sport Aviation.

General characteristics

- Crew: 2
- Length: 24 ft 6.5 in (7.480 m)
- Wingspan: 34 ft 5.5 in (10.503 m)
- Wing area: 195 sq ft (18.1 m^{2})
- Airfoil: Clark Y
- Empty weight: 1,302 lb (591 kg)
- Gross weight: 1,916 lb (869 kg)
- Fuel capacity: 35 U.S. gallons (130 L; 29 imp gal)
- Powerplant: 1 × Kinner R-5 radial engine, 160 hp (120 kW)
- Propellers: 2-bladed Storey

Performance

- Maximum speed: 109 kn (125 mph, 201 km/h)
- Cruise speed: 100 kn (115 mph, 185 km/h)
- Range: 350 nmi (400 mi, 640 km)
- Service ceiling: 17,900 ft (5,500 m)
- Rate of climb: 1,100 ft/min (5.6 m/s)

== See also ==
Related development

- Kinner Sportwing
