= Bach Aircraft =

Former American aircraft manufacturer

Bach Aircraft Company

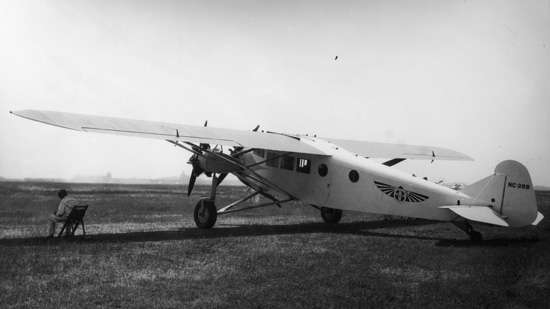
- A Bach 3-CT-4 Air Yacht
- Industry: Aerospace
- Founded: 1927
- Founders: L. Morton Bach
- Key people: Max B. Harlow; Waldo Waterman

The Bach Aircraft Company was established by aviator L. Morton Bach at Clover Field, Santa Monica, California in 1927 to manufacture tri-motor airliners as the Bach Air Yacht in various models, as well as several other aircraft. The company hired Waldo Waterman as its chief test pilot, who brought on Max B. Harlow as the chief engineer. In 1931, the business was reorganized into the Aircraft Production Corporation but did not manufacture any further new designs.

== Aircraft ==
Model name	First flight	Number built	Type
Bach Air Yacht	1927	~21	Trimotor airliner
Bach CS-1			Single engine cabin biplane
Bach CS-4			Single engine cabin biplane
Bach Polar Bear			Single engine open cockpit biplane
Bach Super Transport	N/A	0	Unbuilt four engine airliner
Bach T-11-P			Single engine conversion of 3-CT-6
