= Redfern Fokker Dr.1 =

Fokker Dr.1
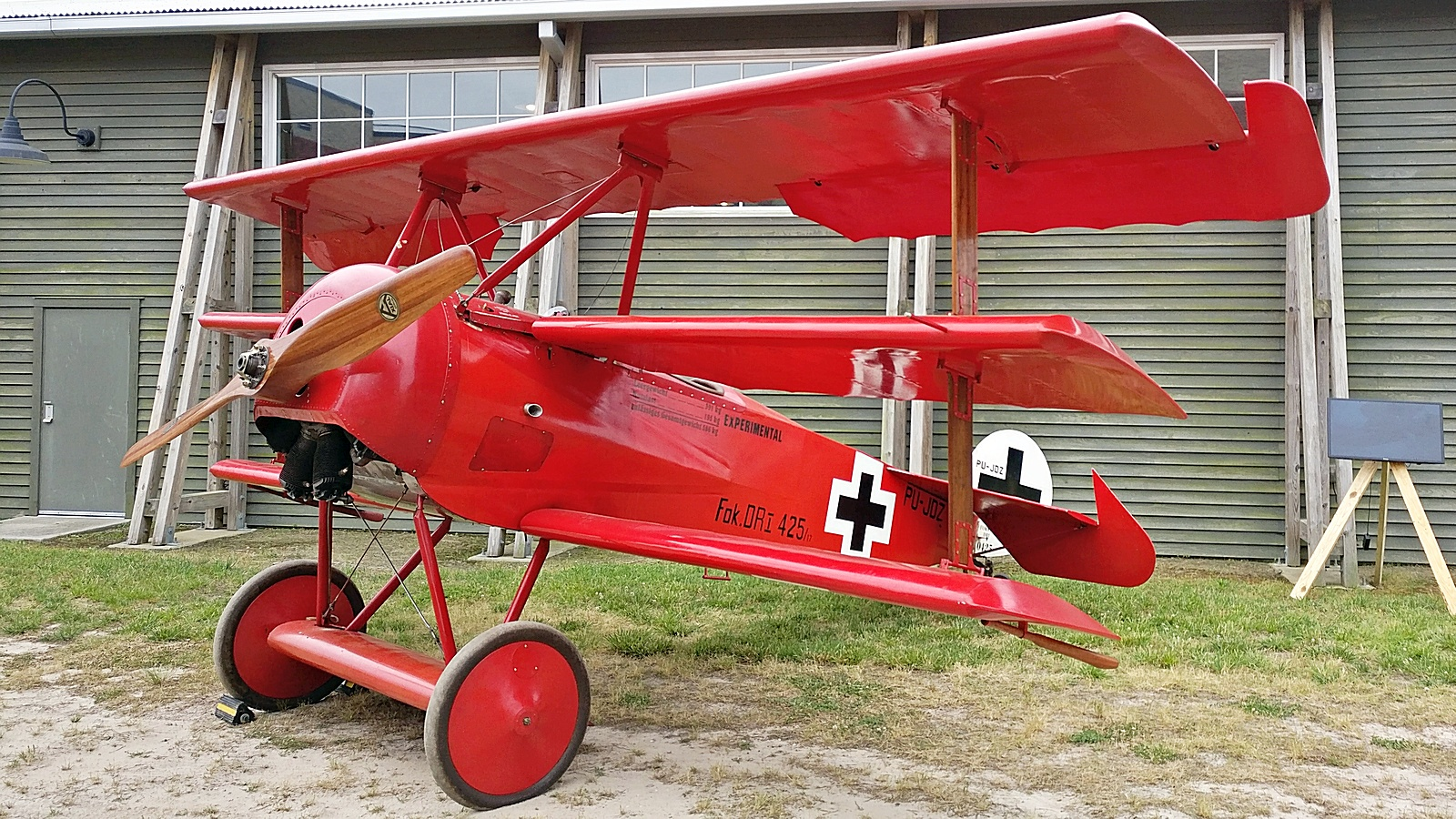
- Redfern Fokker Dr.1

General information
- Type: Homebuilt aircraft
- National origin: United States
- Designer: Walter “Wimpy” W. Redfern

History
- First flight: 24 July 1964
- Developed from: Fokker Dr.I

The Redfern Fokker Dr.1 is a full size replica of the Fokker Dr.I triplane for homebuilt construction.

== Design and development ==
The Refern Fokker Dr.1 is a single engine triplane with conventional landing gear. The aircraft plans were developed by the Walter Redfern Company using Peter M. Bowers' triplane plans, Smithsonian plans and original plans from Reinhold Platz, a member of the original German design team for the Dr.1.

== Specifications (Redfern Fokker Dr.1) ==
Data from EAA

General characteristics

- Crew: 1
- Length: 19 ft (5.8 m)
- Wingspan: 27 ft (8.2 m)
- Wing area: 202 sq ft (18.8 m^{2})
- Empty weight: 1,112 lb (504 kg)
- Gross weight: 1,455 lb (660 kg)
- Fuel capacity: 30 U.S. gallons (110 L; 25 imp gal)
- Powerplant: 1 × Warner Scarab seven cylinder radial engine, 145 hp (108 kW)

Performance

- Maximum speed: 100 kn (120 mph, 190 km/h)
- Cruise speed: 87 kn (100 mph, 160 km/h)
- Range: 260 nmi (300 mi, 480 km)
- Service ceiling: 20,000 ft (6,100 m)
