= Walter Redfern Company =

American homebuilt aircraft manufacturer

- Company type: Privately held company
- Industry: Aerospace
- Founder: Walter "Wimpy" Redfern
- Fate: Out of business circa 1996
- Products: Homebuilt aircraft plans
- Website: redfernplans.com

The Walter Redfern Company, also called Redfern Plans, was an American aircraft manufacturer based in Post Falls, Idaho and founded by Walter "Wimpy" Redfern. The company specialized in the design and provision of plans for homebuilt aircraft, particularly replica aircraft of the First World War.

Redfern's plans were adapted from the original aircraft drawings with assistance from Peter M. Bowers and Reinhold Platz, one of the original design team for the Fokker DR1. Platz continued to collaborate with Redfern until the former's death in 1966.

Redfern built his first aircraft, a Knight Twister in 1949 and completed 15 aircraft before his death in 1996, including five Redfern Fokker Dr.1 models. One of his DR.1s is in the AirVenture Museum in Oshkosh, Wisconsin. Another Redfern-constructed aircraft, a Fokker D.VI, is in a Pittsburgh museum.

After Redfern's death in 1996 his family continued to supply plans for sometime, although they appeared to be no longer available in 2014.

== Aircraft ==
Summary of Redfern aircraft
Model name	First flight	Plans sold	Type
Redfern DH-2			First World War replica fighter aircraft
Redfern Fokker Dr.1		over 5000 by 1999	First World War replica fighter aircraft
Redfern Nieuport 17/24		over 262 by 1999	First World War replica fighter aircraft
