= Sullivan Model K-3 Crested Harpy =

Model K-3 Crested Harpy

General information
- Type: Sportplane
- National origin: United States
- Manufacturer: Sullivan Aircraft Manufacturing Company

History
- Introduction date: 1929

The Sullivan Model K-3 Crested Harpy is a three place light sport aircraft of the 1920s.

== Design ==
The Crested Harpy was a low wing monoplane, with an enclosed cabin which could accommodate a pilot and two passengers. It had conventional landing gear, and was powered by a Kinner K-5. The fuselage is constructed of welded steel tubing with aircraft fabric covering. The Wichita-assembled aircraft featured soundproofing materials.

== Specifications (K-3 Crested Harpy) ==
Data from Aeronautics

General characteristics

- Crew: 1
- Capacity: 1
- Length: 24 ft 5 in (7.44 m)
- Wingspan: 36 ft (11 m)
- Height: 6 ft 10.5 in (2.096 m)
- Gross weight: 1,938 lb (879 kg)
- Powerplant: 1 × Kinner K-5 Five Cylinder radial, 110 hp (82 kW)
- Propellers: 2-bladed

Performance

- Maximum speed: 115 kn (132 mph, 212 km/h)
- Cruise speed: 94 kn (108 mph, 174 km/h)
- Range: 430 nmi (500 mi, 800 km)

== See also ==
Aircraft of comparable role, configuration, and era

- Alexander Eaglerock Bullet
