= Redfern DH-2 =

American homebuilt aircraft

General information
- Type: Homebuilt aircraft
- National origin: United States
- Manufacturer: Walter Redfern Company
- Designer: Walter Redfern
- Status: Plans no longer available
- Number built: 10 (1998)

History
- Developed from: Airco DH.2

The Redfern DH-2 is an American homebuilt aircraft that was designed by Walter Redfern and produced by the Walter Redfern Company of Post Falls, Idaho, based upon the 1915 Airco DH.2 fighter aircraft. When it was available the aircraft was supplied in the form of plans for amateur construction.

== Design and development ==
The DH-2 features a biplane layout, a single-seat open cockpit, fixed conventional landing gear with and a single engine in pusher configuration.

Unlike the original Geoffrey de Havilland designed DH.2, the replica replaces most of the structural wood with welded steel tubing, with its flying surfaces covered in doped aircraft fabric. Its 28.25 ft (8.6 m) span wing, has a wing area of 265.0 sq ft (24.62 m^{2}) and is supported by interplane struts, cabane struts and flying wires. The tail is an open lattice structure to fit around the rearwards-facing propeller and is also cable-braced. The acceptable power range is 125 to 150 hp (93 to 112 kW) and the standard engine used is the 125 hp (93 kW) Kinner B-5 five cylinder radial engine.

The DH-2 has a typical empty weight of 1,100 lb (500 kg) and a gross weight of 1,450 lb (660 kg), giving a useful load of 350 lb (160 kg). With full fuel of 30 U.S. gallons (110 L; 25 imp gal) the payload for the pilot and baggage is 170 lb (77 kg).

The standard day, sea level, no wind, take off with a 125 hp (93 kW) engine is 100 ft (30 m) and the landing roll is 300 ft (91 m).

The manufacturer estimated the construction time from the supplied plans as 2500 hours.

== Operational history ==
By 1998 the company reported that ten aircraft were completed and flying.

== Specifications (DH-2) ==
Data from AeroCrafter

General characteristics

- Crew: one
- Length: 25.17 ft (7.67 m)
- Wingspan: 28 ft 3 in (8.61 m)
- Wing area: 265.0 sq ft (24.62 m^{2})
- Empty weight: 1,100 lb (499 kg)
- Gross weight: 1,450 lb (658 kg)
- Fuel capacity: 30 U.S. gallons (110 L; 25 imp gal)
- Powerplant: 1 × Kinner B-5 five cylinder radial engine, 125 hp (93 kW)
- Propellers: 2-bladed wooden

Performance

- Maximum speed: 95 mph (153 km/h, 83 kn)
- Cruise speed: 75 mph (121 km/h, 65 kn)
- Stall speed: 45 mph (72 km/h, 39 kn)
- Range: 250 mi (400 km, 220 nmi)
- Service ceiling: 12,000 ft (3,700 m)
- Rate of climb: 650 ft/min (3.3 m/s)
- Wing loading: 5.5 lb/sq ft (27 kg/m^{2})

Armament

- Guns: one dummy Vickers machine gun
