= Navarro Chief =

Chief
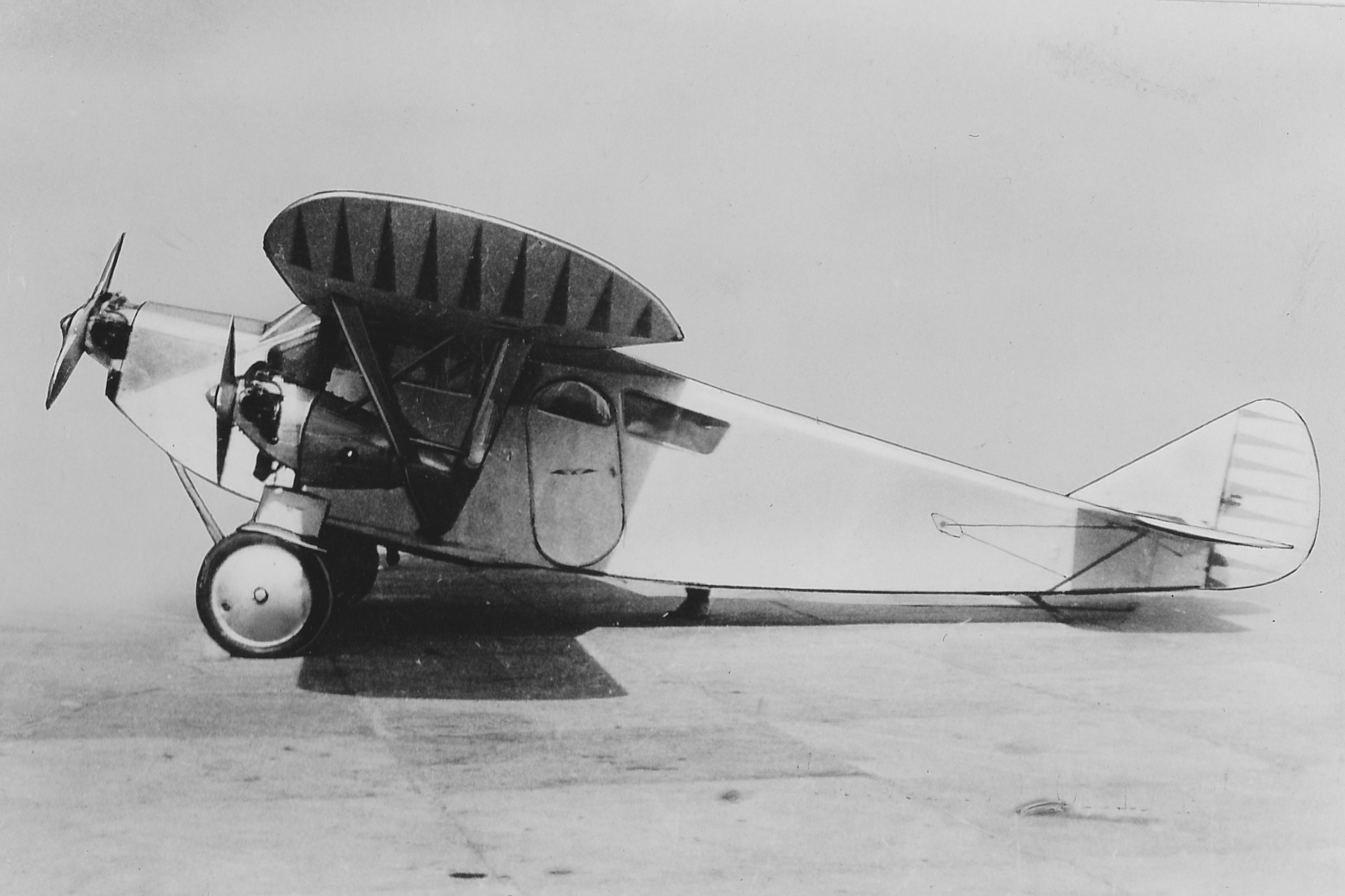

General information
- Type: Trimotor
- National origin: United Kingdom
- Manufacturer: Navarro Safety Aircraft
- Designer: Joseph Navarro
- Number built: 1

The Navarro Chief is a British trimotor aircraft that was designed and built by Navarro Safety Aircraft.

== Development ==
The Chief is a conventional landing gear-equipped, strut-braced, high wing aircraft. The wings are upturned. The elevators are hinged at angles in an attempt at developing a spin-resistant aircraft. The ailerons and elevators were interlinked for roll control. The rudder is split and could be deployed as a speed brake. The fuselage is wood with plywood covering.

== Specifications (Chief) ==
Data from Flight 6 March 1931

General characteristics

- Length: 7.47 m (24 ft 6 in)
- Wingspan: 11.84 m (38 ft 10 in)
- Empty weight: 726 kg (1,600 lb)
- Powerplant: 3 × ABC Scorpion horizontally opposed piston aircraft engine, 25 kW (33 hp) each

Performance

- Maximum speed: 180 km/h (110 mph, 96 kn)

== See also ==
Aircraft of comparable role, configuration, and era

- Erco Ercoupe Two control aircraft
- Kreutzer Air Coach Light Trimotor
