= Redfern Nieuport 17/24 =

American homebuilt aircraft

General information
- Type: Homebuilt aircraft
- National origin: United States
- Manufacturer: Walter Redfern Company
- Designer: Walter Redfern
- Status: Plans no longer available
- Number built: 100 (1998)

History
- Developed from: Nieuport 17; Nieuport 24

The Redfern Nieuport 17/24 is an American homebuilt aircraft that was designed by Walter Redfern and produced by the Walter Redfern Company of Post Falls, Idaho, based upon the First World War Nieuport 17 and Nieuport 24 fighter aircraft. When it was available the aircraft was supplied in the form of plans for amateur construction.

The plans allow a builder to complete the aircraft as either a Nieuport 17 or Nieuport 24.

== Design and development ==
The Nieuport 17/24 features a biplane layout, a single-seat open cockpit, fixed conventional landing gear with and a single engine in tractor configuration.

The replica is built from a combination of wood and metal tubing, all covered in doped aircraft fabric. Its 26.92 ft (8.2 m) span wing, has a wing area of 162.0 sq ft (15.05 m^{2}) and is supported by interplane struts, cabane struts and flying wires. The tail is also cable-braced. The acceptable power range is 145 to 180 hp (108 to 134 kW) and the standard engine used is the 145 hp (108 kW) Warner Scarab seven cylinder radial engine.

Changes over the original aircraft design include the addition of main wheel brakes and a tailwheel, whereas the original aircraft had no brakes and fitted a tailskid.

The Nieuport 17/24 has a typical empty weight of 1,000 lb (450 kg) and a gross weight of 1,280 lb (580 kg), giving a useful load of 280 lb (130 kg). With full fuel of 25 U.S. gallons (95 L; 21 imp gal) the payload for the pilot and baggage is 130 lb (59 kg).

The standard day, sea level, no wind, take off with a 145 hp (108 kW) engine is 125 ft (38 m) and the landing roll is 300 ft (91 m).

The manufacturer estimated the construction time from the supplied plans as 2000 hours.

== Operational history ==
By 1998 the company reported that 100 aircraft were completed and flying.

== Specifications (Nieuport 17/24) ==
Data from AeroCrafter

General characteristics

- Crew: one
- Length: 18 ft 8 in (5.69 m)
- Wingspan: 26.92 ft (8.21 m)
- Wing area: 162.0 sq ft (15.05 m^{2})
- Empty weight: 1,100 lb (499 kg)
- Gross weight: 1,450 lb (658 kg)
- Fuel capacity: 25 U.S. gallons (95 L; 21 imp gal)
- Powerplant: 1 × Warner Scarab seven cylinder radial engine, 145 hp (108 kW)
- Propellers: 2-bladed wooden

Performance

- Maximum speed: 125 mph (201 km/h, 109 kn)
- Cruise speed: 100 mph (160 km/h, 87 kn)
- Stall speed: 45 mph (72 km/h, 39 kn)
- Range: 225 mi (362 km, 196 nmi)
- Service ceiling: 12,500 ft (3,800 m)
- Rate of climb: 1,200 ft/min (6.1 m/s)
- Wing loading: 7.9 lb/sq ft (39 kg/m^{2})

Armament

- Guns: one dummy Vickers machine gun
