= Candler Field Museum =

Former aviation museum in Williamson, Georgia, US

Coordinates: 33°11′00″N 84°22′18″W

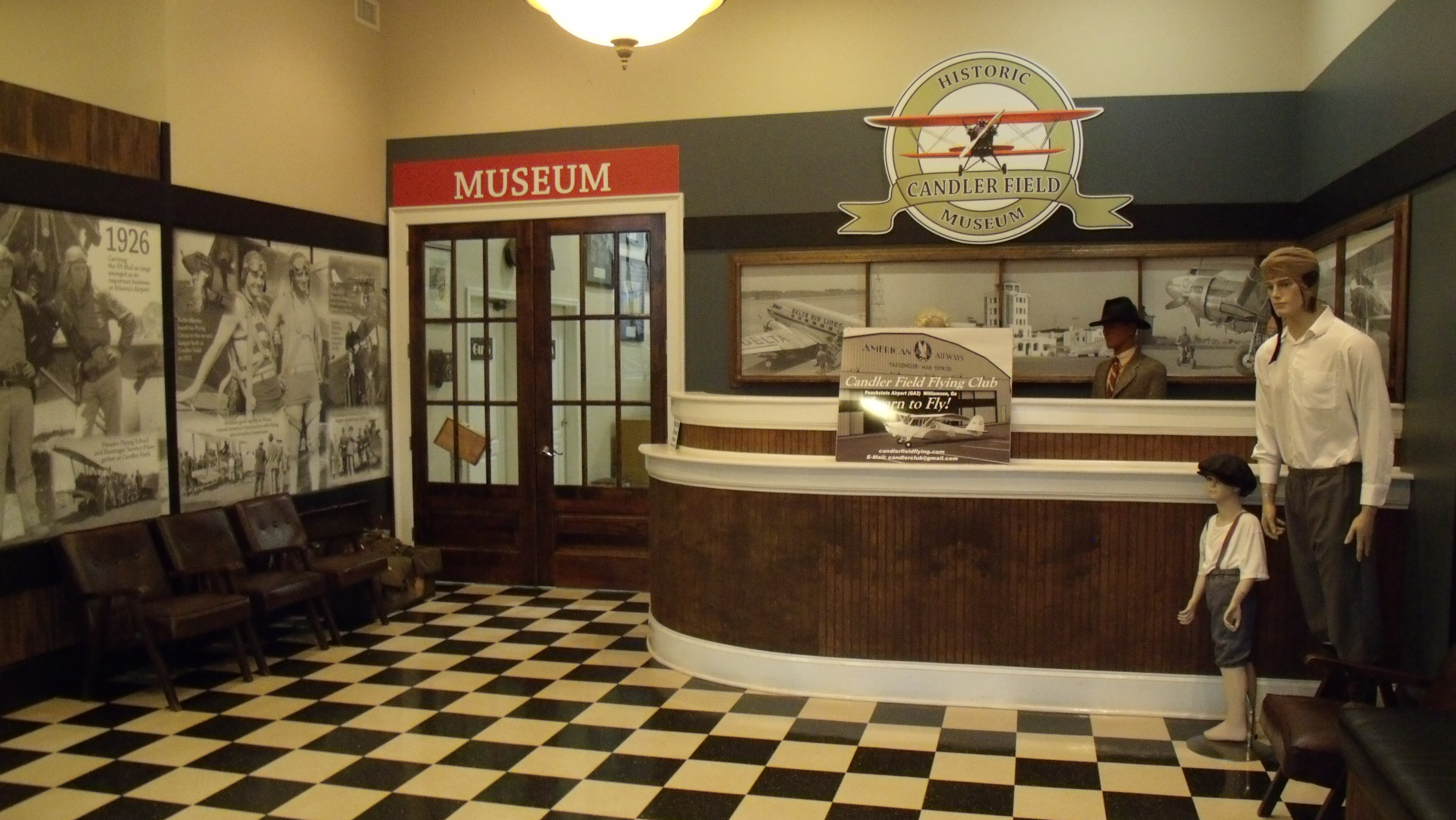
Museum lobby

The Candler Field Museum was a non-profit venture to recreate the Hartsfield–Jackson Atlanta International Airport as it appeared in the 1920s and 1930s. It was located in Williamson, Georgia, at Peach State Airport. Founded in March 2005 as Candler Field Museum, Inc., it featured one complete building, several aircraft and vehicles, and a large collection of an era and general aeronautical memorabilia. The museum closed in February 2021.

== History ==
In 2005, retired pilot Ronald Alexander bought Peach State Airport. In March 2004, he founded Candler Field Museum, Inc., a 501(c)(3) organization with the purpose to recreate the old Atlanta airport. In September 2008, the first building (American Airways hangar) was completed; as of October 2014, it was open to the public. The museum closed in February 2021.

== Collection ==
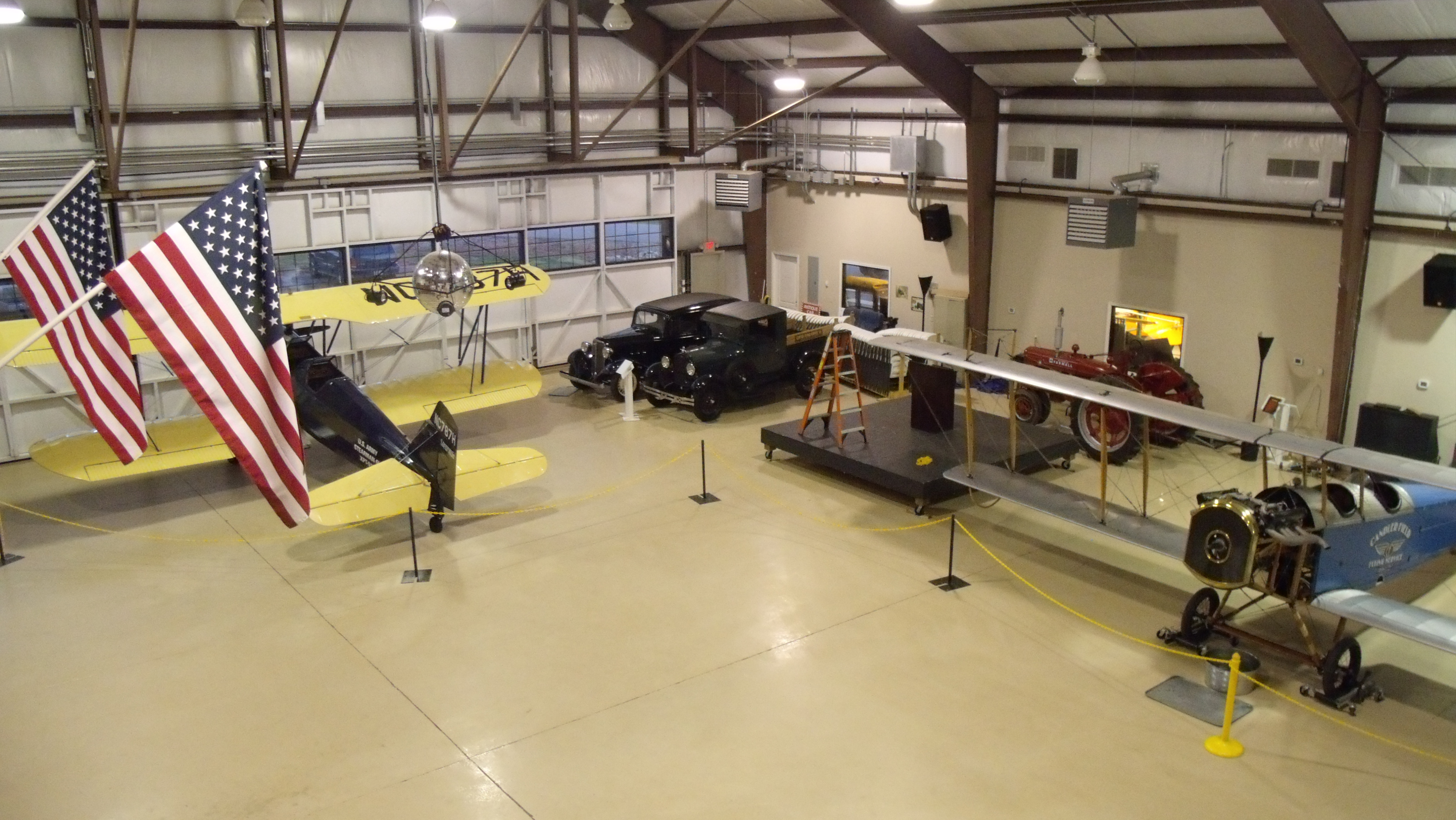
View from museum balcony

Several aircraft were kept at the museum, including a 1917 Curtiss JN-4, a 1928 Curtiss Robin, a 1930 6L Stearman, a 1940 Douglas DC-3A, a 1941 PT-17 Stearman, and a Waco YMF-5. The Museum also kept vintage vehicles, including (but not limited to) Ford Model As, Model Ts, and a 1909 Sears (Lincoln Motor Car Works). All museum machines were in running condition, as, in the owner's words, anything that does not run "will be hung from the ceiling."

The museum's Waco biplane was also used to provide biplane rides for a fee. For the use of museum members was a library, well stocked with aviation-themed books, magazines, and photographs.

== Affiliates ==
Candler Field Museum was affiliated with or supported the following:

- Flabob Airport, Riverside, California
- Curtiss Jenny JN-4 Restoration, Peachtree City, Georgia (aircraft based at Peach State Airport)
- Youth Mentorship Program, Candler Field
- Old Rhinebeck Aerodrome's restoration of its reproduction Nieuport 11 World War I French fighter plane after a crash some years ago

== See also ==
- Delta Flight Museum
