= Kinner Sportwing =

Type of aircraft

Sportwing
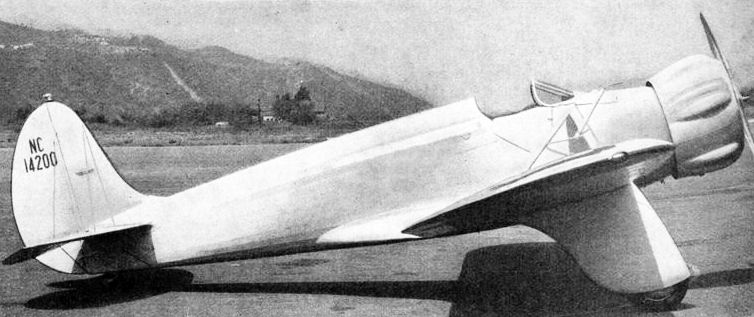
- 1934 Kinner Sportwing B-2

General information
- Type: Light monoplane
- Manufacturer: Kinner Airplane & Motor Corporation
- Designer: Max B. Harlow, Robert Porter
- Status: 1 airworthy
- Number built: 8 B-2, 3 B-2R

History
- First flight: 1933

The Kinner Sportwing is an American light, low-wing monoplane that was built by Kinner Airplane & Motor Corporation in Glendale, California in the 1930s.

== Design and development ==
The Sportwing is an improved version of the company's earlier Sportster, designed by Max Harlow. It is a twin-seat cantilever low-wing monoplane of mixed construction, powered by a tractor-mounted Kinner 5-B five-cylinder radial engine rated at 125 hp, and a fixed wooden propeller. An NACA cowling with blisters encloses the engine, though some B-2s and B-2Rs had none, like the Sportster.

The structure of the oval cross-section fuselage consists of welded chrome-molybdenum steel tube covered in fabric. The forwardmost bulkhead attaches directly to the steel tube engine mounting; this specific bulkhead functions as a firewall. The wing is constructed with spruce spars, ribs and a double drag truss, and covered in fabric. Each wing is attached to short stubs integral with the fuselage and braced to the top fuselage longerons by inverted V-struts. Fillets are fitted over the wing roots. The open cockpit, which seats two abreast behind a shatterproof-glass windscreen, has detachable dual flight controls, as well as instrumentation that includes a tachometer, altimeter, air speed indicator, compass, oil pressure gauge and oil temperature gauge. Egress from the aircraft is achieved via hinged doors on both sides, above the wing, with a hand hold on the fuselage to assist.

The double wire-braced empennage is constructed in the same fashion as the fuselage, composed of steel and covered with fabric. The flight control surfaces are actuated in a conventional manner via orthodox joysticks and pedals. The wings have no flaps, but the elevators have trim tabs. The undercarriage is the conventional type with tail wheel and fixed main wheels, each with a shock absorber and parking brake. Depending on the aircraft purchased at the time, the undercarriage came fitted with "trouser" fairings, rounded spats, or no fairings at all on later models.

A total of eight Sportwing B-2s and three B-2Rs were constructed. An enlarged four-seat version was produced in 1935 as the Kinner Envoy.

== Operational history ==
Early owners of the Sportwing included American businessman and aviation and glider pioneer Richard du Pont, who broke a glider distance record in 1933, and Irish-American stage, film, and television actor George Brent who, in 1934, took his first solo flight in it after only six hours of dual-control flight instruction. In the 1970s, aircraft and automotive collector Glenn Pray (1925—2011) of Broken Arrow, Oklahoma owned a B-2. Known as the originator of the replica, 8/10-scale Cord, Pray took it to numerous fly-ins, including the 15th-annual fly-in at Oceanside Airport in 1975 hosted by the San Diego chapter of the Antique Airplane Association, the 3rd-annual AAA's invitational at Parson Tri-City Airport in 1978, winning Best Golden-Age Monoplane award and AAA award for rarest plane, and another in 1980, again at Parson Tri-City Airport.

Kinner became bankrupt in 1937 with assets that included approved type certificates, engineering data and production equipment on three airplanes formerly manufactured by the Kinner company being acquired by the Timm Aircraft Company in July 1939.

== Variants ==
Sportwing B-2

Powered by a 125 hp (93 kW) Kinner B-5 engine.

Number	Tail number	Construction number	Remarks	Image
1	NC13791	c/n 100	Fitted with engine cowling and "trouser" gear	
2	NC13797	c/n 128	Fitted with engine cowling and "trouser" gear	
3	NC14200	c/n 120	Fitted with engine cowling and "trouser" gear	
4	NC14212	c/n 132	Fitted with engine cowling and "trouser" gear	
5	NC14214	c/n 130	Fitted with engine cowling and "trouser" gear. Once owned by Irish-American stage, film, and television actor George Brent	
6	NC14224	c/n 140		
7	NC14234	c/n 144	Fitted with engine cowling and rounded wheel spats	
8	NC14927	c/n 148	Last extant example, fitted with rounded wheel spats but no engine cowling. Acquired in 2016 by David Devries of Windham, New Hampshire	

Sportster B-2R

Powered by a 160 hp (120 kW) Kinner R-5 engine.

Number	Tail number	Construction number	Remarks	Image
9	NC14964	c/n 226		
10	NC14965	c/n 230	Rebuilt by Timm Aircraft Corporation as a tandem two-seat Aerocraft 2AS (example pictured)	
11	NC16098	c/n 231		

== Surviving aircraft ==
Of the eleven Sportwings that were constructed, one B-2 from 1935 continues to exist in airworthy condition. In 2016 it was purchased by David Devries of Windham, New Hampshire, with the plane being delivered to him courtesy the seller. In June of that year, Devries hired Posey Brothers Inc. of Trenton, New Jersey to undertake restoration of the aircraft, with the B-5 engine sent to Antique Aero Engines in Santa Paula, California for rebuilding. In August 2017, after fifteen months or restoration, Devries was informed that the plane was ready to fly, which it did on July 22, 2017, piloted by Larry Posey. Devries flew it for the first time on August 26, 2017. It is currently registered to Excalibur Air Service in Windham, with David M. DeVries as registered agent.

== Specifications (B-2) ==
Data from

General characteristics

- Crew: 1 pilot
- Capacity: 1 co-pilot or passenger
- Length: 24 ft 2 in (7.37 m)
- Wingspan: 34 ft 5 in (10.49 m)
- Height: 7 ft 2 in (2.18 m)
- Wing area: 174.25 sq ft (16.188 m^{2})
- Empty weight: 1,197 lb (543 kg)
- Gross weight: 1,875 lb (850 kg)
- Fuel capacity: 35 gallons
- Load: 633 lb (287 kg)
- Powerplant: 1 × Kinner B-5 5-cyl. air-cooled radial piston engine, 125 hp (93 kW)

Performance

- Maximum speed: 122 mph (196 km/h, 106 kn)
- Cruise speed: 110 mph (180 km/h, 96 kn)
- Stall speed: 48 mph (77 km/h, 42 kn)
- Range: 450 mi (720 km, 390 nmi)
- Rate of climb: 800 ft/min (4.1 m/s)
- Wing loading: 10 lb/sq ft (49 kg/m^{2})

== See also ==
Related development ,

- Kinner Envoy

== Notes, citations and sources ==
Notes

Citations

Newsprint

- "New Resident Buys Airplane, Arrives At Home on Fairfax". Riverside Daily Press. 25 May 1934. p. 5 – via Newspapers.com.
- Taft, C.L. (27 Jun 1934). "Airport Airings: Aviation is rapidly taking the lead in the Sportsman's life". Alameda Times Star. p. 8 – via Newspapers.com.
- "Star in Solo Flight". The Evening Courier. 28 Jun 1934. p. 10 – via Newspapers.com.
- "Kinner Airplane Seeks Bankruptcy". San Francisco Chronicle. 3 Dec 1937. p. 21 – via Newspapers.com.
- "Timm Aircraft Buys Three Kinner Planes". Los Angeles Times. 19 Feb 1939. p. 22 – via Newspapers.com.
- "Kinner Motors Backlog Growing". Los Angeles Times. 26 Dec 1939. p. 20 – via Newspapers.com.* Watry, Charles A. (29 Jul 1975). "Antique Plane Fly Into O'Side". North County Times. p. 3 – via Newspapers.com.
- Dressler, Nancy (17 Jul 1978). "Antique Planes Delight Crowds". Parsons Sun. p. 1&4 – via Newspapers.com.
- "Fly-In Preparation 'Shaping Up'". Parsons Sun. 4 Jul 1980. p. 4 – via Newspapers.com.

Publications

- Underwood, John (1969). "The Quiet Professor". Air Progress Sport Aircraft (Winter 1969).
- "Digest of American Aircraft, Engines, Accessories". Aero Digest. Vol. 26, no. 4. April 1935. p. 80.

Websites

- "Flying Equipment: A New Plane and a New Engine by Kinner". Aviation. Feb 1934. pp. 58–59.
- Eckland, K.O. (7 Jun 2007). "American airplanes: Kinner". Aerofiles.
- "No. 10059. Kinner Sportwing B-2 (NC14214 c/n 130)". Nico Braas Memorial Collection. 10 Oct 2010.
- "In Loving Memory of Glenn A, Pray". Fitzgerald Funeral Service. 23 Mar 2011.
- Strohl, Daniel (25 Mar 2011). "Glenn Pray, originator of the replica Cord, dies". Hemmings Motor News.
- Johnson, Dennis K. (1 Jan 2020). "The last Kinner Sportwing flies again". Aircraft Owners and Pilots Association.
- "Excalibur Air Service LLC". New Hampshire Company Directory. 3 May 2002.
- Hirschman, Dave (10 Aug 2022). "Kinner Sportwing". YouTube.
- "N14927". Aviation Database. 28 Aug 2025.
- "Retractable landing gear". Century of Flight. "streamlined coverings that extended down from the fuselage, with the wheels sticking out at the bottom. These were generally referred to as "trouser" gear."
