= Wright R-540 Whirlwind =

Series of aircraft engines

R-540 Whirlwind
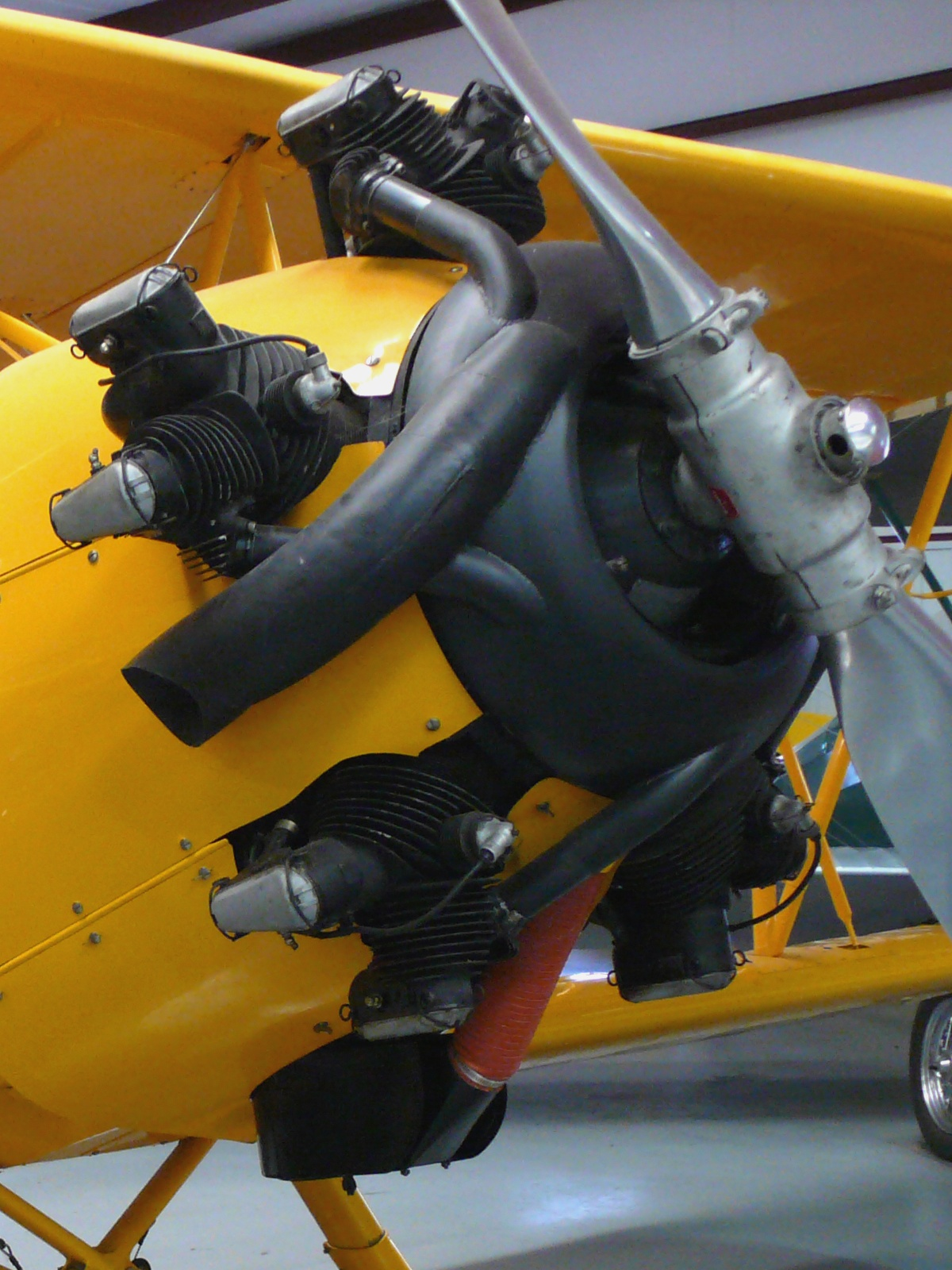
- Wright R-540 Whirlwind installed in a Travel Air 16E at the Historic Aircraft Restoration Museum
- Type: Air-cooled 5-cylinder radial piston engine
- National origin: United States
- Manufacturer: Wright Aeronautical Corporation
- Major applications: Various light aircraft
- Manufactured: 1929–1937
- Number built: 536

The Wright R-540 Whirlwind was a series of five-cylinder air-cooled radial aircraft engines built by the Wright Aeronautical division of Curtiss-Wright. These engines had a displacement of 540 in³ (8.85 L) and power ratings of around 165-175 hp (123-130 kW). They were the smallest members of the Wright Whirlwind engine family.

== Design and development ==
Wright introduced the J-6 Whirlwind family in 1928 to replace the nine-cylinder R-790 series. The J-6 family included varieties with five, seven, and nine cylinders. The five-cylinder version was originally known as the J-6 Whirlwind Five, or J-6-5 for short. The U.S. government designated it as the R-540; Wright later adopted this and dropped the J-6 nomenclature.

Like all the members of the J-6 Whirlwind family, the R-540 had larger cylinders than the R-790. The piston stroke of 5.5 in (14.0 cm) was unchanged, but the cylinder bore was expanded to 5.0 in (12.7 cm) from the R-790's bore of 4.5 in (11.4 cm). While the R-790 was naturally aspirated, the R-540, like the other J-6 engines, had a gear-driven supercharger to boost its power output.

Wright gradually refined the R-540, using suffix letters to indicate successive versions. For example, the R-540A had 165 hp (123 kW), while the R-540E of 1931 had power boosted to 175 hp (130 kW) thanks to an improved cylinder head design. Wright sometimes named these versions according to their power, e.g. "Whirlwind 165" or "Whirlwind 175".

The engine was built in Spain as the Hispano-Suiza 5Q or Hispano-Wright 5Q without modification apart from the use of Hispano's patented nitriding finishing process.

== Operational history ==
The R-540 was the smallest, least powerful member of the Whirlwind family and was designed for light aircraft. One of the more popular types to use it was the Curtiss Robin, a light civil utility aircraft. A few were also used in prototype military trainer aircraft that were evaluated by the U.S. Army but not put into production.

The R-540 sold well at first, with over 400 engines being built in 1929. However, with the impact of the Great Depression, sales plummeted, and only about 100 further examples were built over the next eight years. Wright finally ceased production of five-cylinder Whirlwinds in 1937, concentrating on larger engines and leaving the market for small radials to companies like Kinner and Warner.

Since R-540 engines were found solely in light aircraft, they weren't often used for groundbreaking flights. However, there were a couple of noteworthy exceptions which took advantage of the Whirlwind family's reputation for high reliability. In 1935, the brothers Al and Fred Key set a new flight endurance record of 653 hours, 34 minutes in the Curtiss Robin J-1 Ole Miss, flying over Meridian, Mississippi, from June 4 to July 1. Their plane was refueled and resupplied in flight, and they could perform simple engine maintenance by walking out on a small catwalk extending between the cabin and the engine. Douglas "Wrong-Way" Corrigan's famous unauthorized transatlantic flight from New York City to Dublin, Ireland on July 17–18, 1938, used a Curtiss Robin with an R-540 built from the parts of two used engines.

== Applications ==
- Curtiss Robin J-1
- Curtiss-Wright CW-16
- Detroit-Parks P-2A
- Emsco B-7
- Kreider-Reisner Challenger C-4C (Fairchild KR-34C)
- General Aristocrat
- Saro Cloud
- Spartan C3-165
- Stinson Junior SM-2AA and SM-2AB
- Travel Air E-4000
- Waco BSO

== Engines on display ==
Wright R-540 engines on display are uncommon, but there is one at the Strategic Air and Space Museum (formerly the Strategic Air Command Museum) near Ashland, Nebraska. Another is on display at the Shannon Air Museum in Fredericksburg, Virginia.

== Specifications (R-540E) ==
Data from FAA type certificate data sheet for the R-540E; dimensions from Curtiss-Wright (1983).

=== General characteristics ===
- Type: 5-cylinder supercharged air-cooled radial piston engine
- Bore: 5.0 in (127 mm)
- Stroke: 5.5 in (140 mm)
- Displacement: 540 cu in (8.85 L)
- Length: 41.1 in (104.4 cm)
- Diameter: 45.0 in (114.3 cm)
- Dry weight: 420 lb (191 kg)

=== Components ===
- Valvetrain: 2 valves per cylinder, pushrod-actuated
- Supercharger: gear-driven, 7.05:1 impeller gear ratio
- Fuel type: 65 octane
- Reduction gear: Direct drive

=== Performance ===
- Power output: 175 hp (130 kW) at 2,000 RPM at sea level
- Specific power: 0.324 hp/cu-in (14.7 kW/L)
- Compression ratio: 5.1:1
- Power-to-weight ratio: 0.417 hp/lb (0.685 kW/kg)

== See also ==
- Wright Whirlwind

Related development

- Wright J-5/R-790
- Wright J-6-7/R-760
- Wright J-6-9/R-975

Comparable engines

- Armstrong Siddeley Mongoose
- Kinner R-5
- Shvetsov M-11

Related lists

- List of aircraft engines
