= Kinner K-5 =

1930s American aircraft engine

K-5
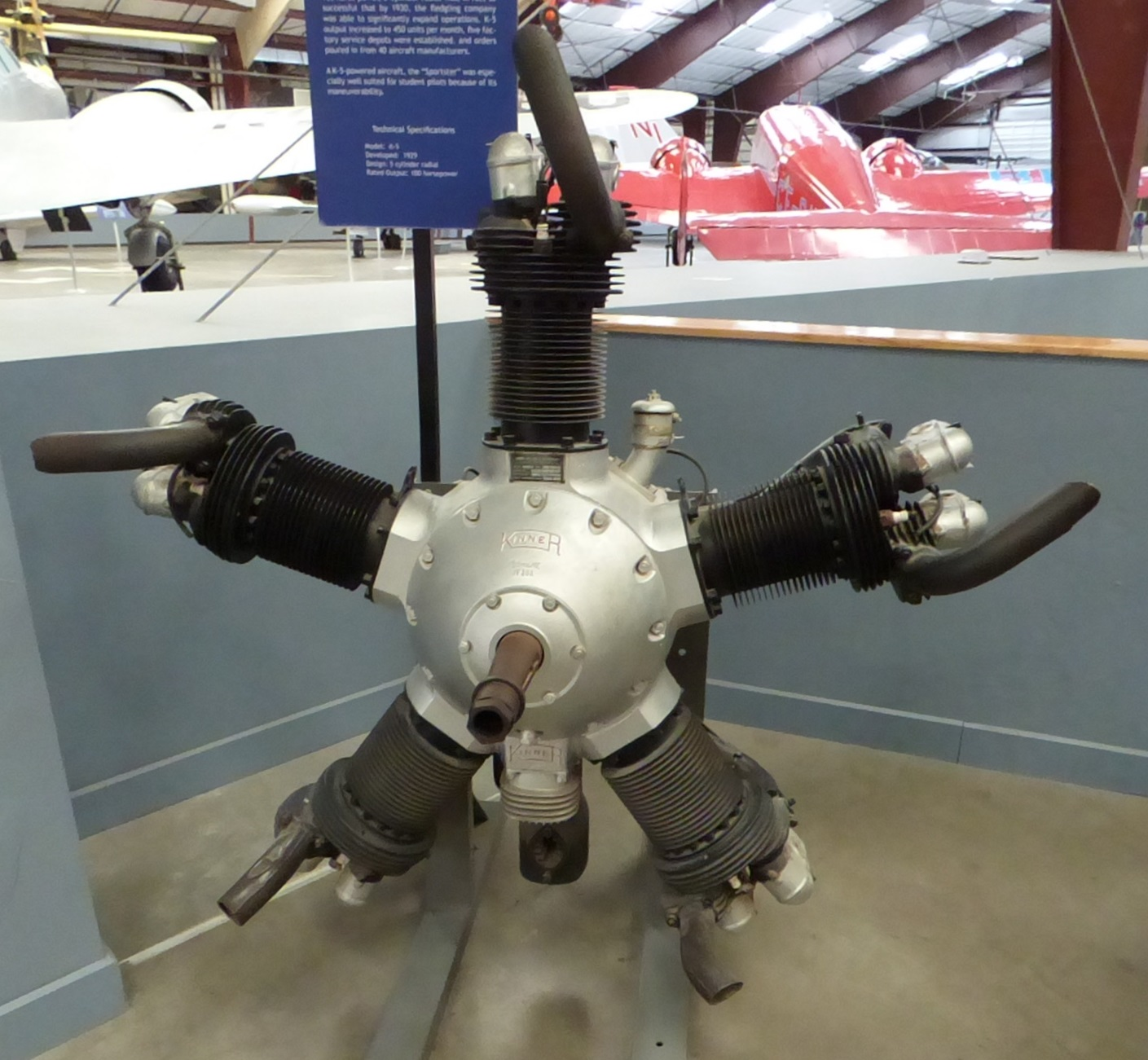
- Kinner K-5 on display at the Pima Air & Space Museum
- Type: Radial engine
- National origin: United States of America
- Manufacturer: Kinner Airplane & Motor Corporation
- Developed into: Kinner B-5

The Kinner K-5 was a popular engine for light general and sport aircraft developed by Winfield B. 'Bert' Kinner. With the boom in civilian aviation after Charles Lindbergh's transatlantic flight the K-5 sold well. The K-5 was a rough running but reliable engine and the K-5 and its derivatives were produced in the thousands, powering many World War II trainer aircraft. The K-5 was followed by the B-5, R-5 and R-55. Military engines were designated R-370.

== Variants ==
K-5
Rated at 100 hp (75 kW) at 1,810 rpm.
K-52
Rated at 100 hp (75 kW) at 1,810 rpm.

== Applications ==
- Adcox Special
- American Eagle A-129 biplane
- Chamberlin C-2
- Davis D-1-K
- Fleet Model 2
- Granville Brothers Model A biplane
- Kinner Sportster
- Kreutzer Air Coach
- Simplex C-2 Red Arrow
- Sullivan Model K-3 Crested Harpy
- Waco KSO

== Specifications (Kinner K-5) ==
Data from Jane's all the World's Aircraft 1928

=== General characteristics ===
- Type: Five-cylinder, air-cooled, radial
- Bore: 4.25 in (108 mm)
- Displacement: 372.4 cu in (6.103 L)
- Length: 19 in (480 mm)
- Diameter: 43.5 in (1,100 mm)
- Dry weight: 231 lb (105 kg)

=== Components ===
- Valvetrain: 1 inlet and 1 exhaust valve per cylinder
- Fuel system: 1 Stromberg carburetor or 1 double Zenith carburetor
- Fuel type: 73 Octane
- Oil system: pressure fed through hollow crankshaft
- Cooling system: Air

=== Performance ===
- Power output:
  - 100 hp (75 kW) at 1,810 rpm maximum
  - 70 hp (52 kW) at 1,650 rpm cruise
- Compression ratio: 5.0:1
- Fuel consumption: 7 gal/h (5.8 imp gal/h; 26 L/h)
- Oil consumption: 0.3125 gal/h (0.2602 imp gal/h; 1.183 L/h)
- Power-to-weight ratio: 0.36 hp/lb (0.59 kW/kg) at cruise
