= Kinner B-5 =

1930s American piston aircraft engine

B-5
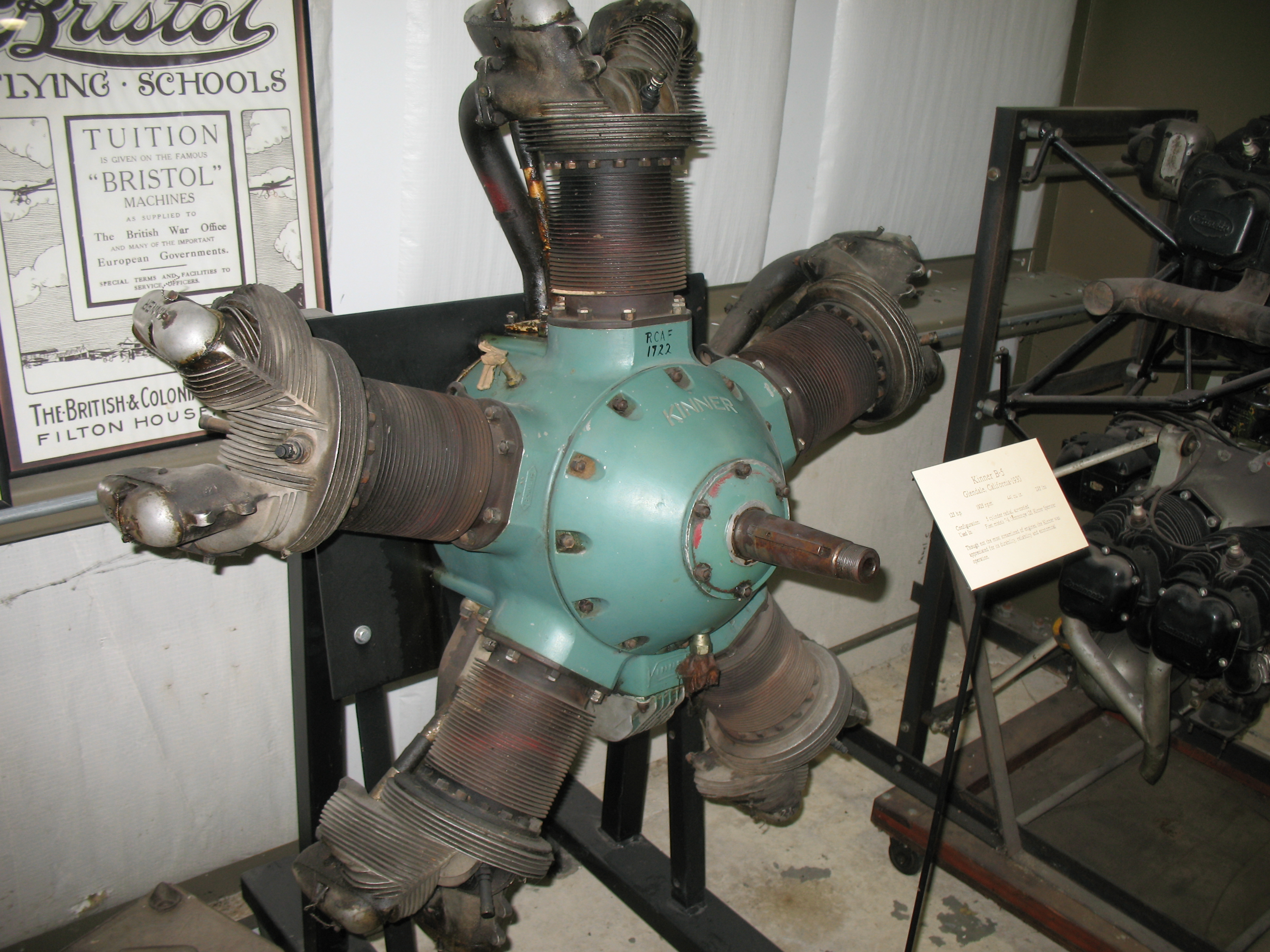
- A Kinner B-5 on display at the Old Rhinebeck Aerodrome in New York, as used in their Fleet Finch biplane.
- Type: Radial engine
- Manufacturer: Kinner Airplane & Motor Corporation
- Developed from: Kinner K-5
- Developed into: Kinner R-5

The Kinner B-5 was a popular five-cylinder American radial engine for light general and sport aircraft of the 1930s.

== Design and development ==
The B-5 was a development of the earlier K-5 with slightly greater power and dimensions. The main change was the increase in cylinder bore from 108 mm (4.25 in) to 117 mm (4.625 in) and a corresponding increase in displacement from 372 cu in (6.1 liters ) to 441 cu in (7.2 liters). One difference the B-5 had from radial engines of other manufacturers was that each individual cylinder had its own camshaft, a system also used by the contemporary Soviet-built, 520 cubic inches (8.6 L) displacement Shvetsov M-11 five-cylinder radial, while most other radial engine designs used a "cam ring" for the same purpose, connected to every cylinder's valves. The B-5 was a rough running but reliable engine. The B-5 and its derivatives were produced in the thousands, powering many World War II trainer aircraft; its military designation was R-440. The B-5 was followed by the R-5 and R-55.

== Variants ==
B-5
Rated at 125 hp (93 kW) at 1,925 rpm.

B-54
Rated at 125 hp (93 kW) at 1,925 rpm.

R-440-1
Military version of B-5
R-440-3
Military version of B-54

== Applications ==
- Cox-Klemin XS
- Fleet Fawn
- Fleet Finch
- Kinner Sportster
- Kinner Sportwing
- Lincoln AP
- Monocoupe 125
- Redfern DH-2
- Ryan PT-22 Recruit
- Savoia-Marchetti S.56

== Specifications (Kinner B-5) ==
Data from Jane's all the World's Aircraft 1938

=== General characteristics ===
- Type: Five-cylinder, air-cooled, radial
- Bore: 4.625 in (117.5 mm)
- Stroke: 5.25 in (133 mm)
- Displacement: 441 cu in (7.23 L)
- Length: 32.325 in (821.1 mm)
- Diameter: 45.375 in (1,152.5 mm)
- Dry weight: 295 lb (134 kg)

=== Components ===
- Valvetrain: 1 Inlet and 1 Exhaust valve per cylinder, individual camshafts for each cylinder
- Fuel system: 1x Holley or Stromberg Carburetor
- Fuel type: 73 Octane
- Oil system: Circulating dry sump system
- Cooling system: Air-cooled

=== Performance ===
- Power output: 125 hp (93 kW) at 1,925 rpm max; 89 hp (66 kW) at 1,725 rpm cruise
- Compression ratio: 5.25:1
- Specific fuel consumption: 0.60 lb/hp hr (0.365 kg/kw hr)
- Oil consumption: 0.025 lb/hp hr (0.0152 kg/kw hr)
- Power-to-weight ratio: 0.42 horsepower per pound (0.69 kW/kg) at cruise

== See also ==
Related development

- Kinner K-5
- Kinner R-5

Comparable engines

- Armstrong Siddeley Genet Major
- Shvetsov M-11

Related lists

- List of aircraft engines
