= Kinner Airplane & Motor Corporation =

Historical American manufacturer

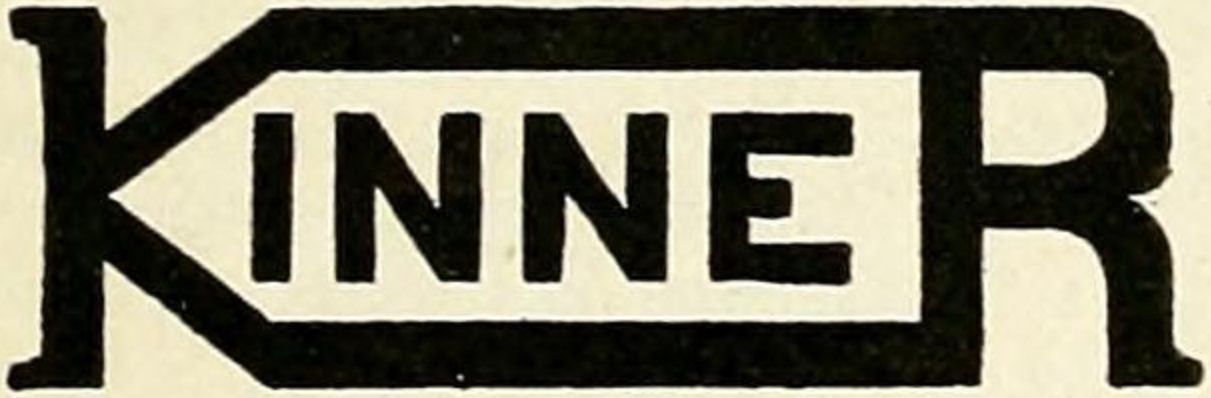

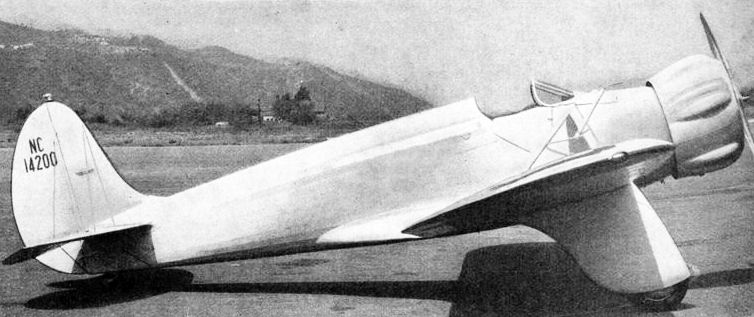
- A Kinner Sportwing in the magazine L'Aerophile in October 1935
- Industry: Aerospace
- Founders: Bert Kinner
- Defunct: 1937
- Fate: Bankrupt in 1937
- Successor: O.W. Timm Aircraft Company
- Key people: Max B. Harlow

Kinner Airplane & Motor Corp was an airplane and engine manufacturer, founded, in the mid-1920s, in Glendale, California, United States, by Bert Kinner, the manager of Kinner Field. Kinner's chief engineer was Max B. Harlow who later founded the Harlow Aircraft Company. It went bankrupt in 1937, and the aircraft rights were sold to O.W. Timm Aircraft Company. The engine department was rearranged as Kinner Motor Inc in 1938, but collapsed in 1946. Kinner became the West Coast's largest producer of aircraft engines in 1941.

== Products ==
=== Aircraft ===
Model name	First flight	Number built	Type
Kinner Airster	1920		Single engine biplane
Kinner Sportster	1932		Single engine sport monoplane
Kinner Sportwing	1933		Single engine sport monoplane
Kinner Playboy	1933	13	Single engine sport monoplane
Kinner Envoy	1934	8	Single engine cabin monoplane

=== Engines ===
Model name	Configuration	Power
Kinner K-5	R5	100 hp
Kinner B-5	R5	125 hp
Kinner R-5	R5	160 hp
Kinner C-5	R5	245 hp
Kinner C-7		340 hp

Kinner also made the K-1 (1921, radial 3), K-2 (1927, radial 5), and K-3 (modified K-2) engines.
