= Max B. Harlow =

American aircraft engineer and educator

- Born: 1903; South Dakota, U.S.
- Died: May 1967 (aged 63–64); Pasadena, California
- Occupations: Professor, Aircraft Engineer
- Employer: Pasadena Junior College
- Spouse: Evelyn
- Children: Ann

Max B. Harlow (1903 –1967) was an American aircraft engineer, educator, and producer.

== Early life ==
Harlow was born in South Dakota in 1903. Harlow attended Stanford University, becoming an early aircraft engineering graduate. His first position was with Thaden Metal Aircraft Company to develop an early all-metal aircraft, the Thaden T-1. He assisted Waldo Waterman in the design and construction of the prototype Waterman Whatsit tailless aircraft. Waterman was chief test pilot for Bach Aircraft and brought Harlow in to improve the design of the Bach Air Yacht trimotors. Harlow also worked for a brief period in 1930 for Lockheed Brothers Aircraft Corporation on the Olympia Duo-four wooden aircraft. In 1932, Harlow worked for Bert Kinner becoming his chief engineer in the design of the Kinner Playboy, Sportwing, and Speedwing. When Kinner's company folded in 1934, he went to work for Douglas and a stress engineer for the DC-2 wing.

Harlow became a professor at Pasadena Junior College in 1935 forming the Aero-Tech laboratory. While a professor, he was able to join the local Hollywood engineering team developing the Hughes H-1 Racer which would lead to future business connections. As a student project, the college developed the Harlow PJC-1. Harlow formed the Harlow Aircraft Company at the Alhambra Airport to commercially build the PJC "Pasadena Junior College" series of aircraft and military trainers. From 1936-1942 students worked on designing and producing a series of advanced all-metal retractable gear lightplanes under Harlow's supervision. Funding came from former Howard Hughes business partner J.B. Alexander. The aircraft were tested at the airstrip at Alhambra, California.

== Sources ==
- Curriculum Problems in Vocational Education for the Aircraft Industry - Max B. Harlow 1944
