= Kreutzer Air Coach =

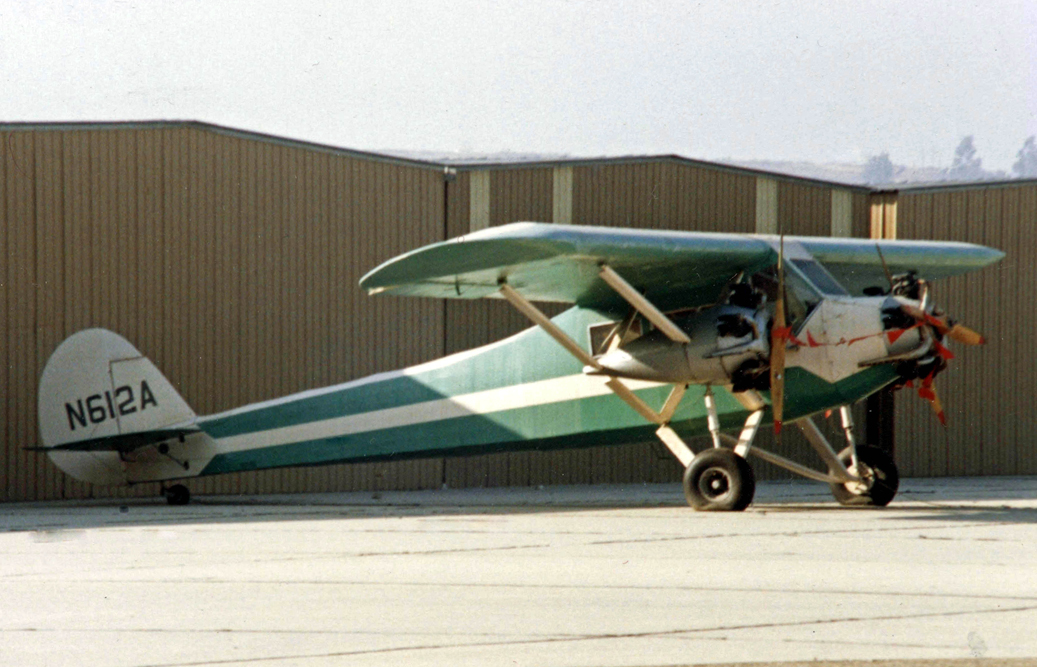
- The sole surviving K-5 Air Coach at Camarillo Airport, California, in 1990

General information
- Type: light transport aircraft
- National origin: United States
- Manufacturer: Joseph Kreutzer Corporation
- Designer: Lawrence Brown & Albin Peterson
- Status: one surviving airworthy example
- Primary user: small air transport operators
- Number built: 15

History
- Manufactured: 1928-1929
- Introduction date: 1929
- First flight: 5 December 1928
- Developed from: Brown-Mercury C-2

The Kreutzer Air Coach is an American-built light trimotor transport aircraft of the late 1920s.

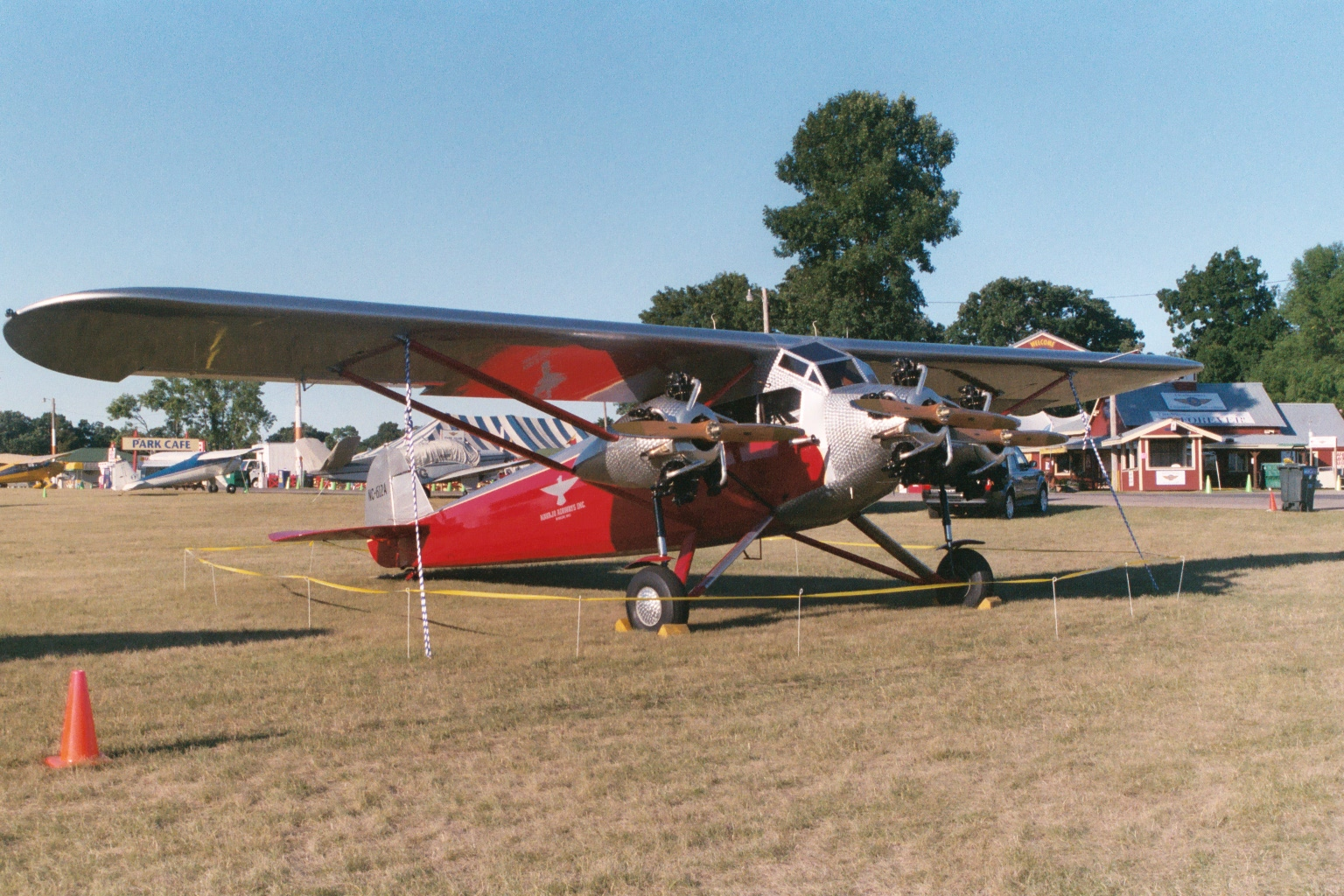
1929 Kreutzer Air Coach K-5 N612A preserved in the colours of Navajo Airways

== Design and development ==
Joseph Kreutzer formed the company of the same name in Los Angeles in late 1928. In 1929 the firm moved to Clover Field, Santa Monica, California, occupying the former Bach aircraft factory. Kreutzer was joined by Lawrence Brown and Albin Peterson who had designed the Brown-Mercury C-2.

Kreutzer developed a series of small high-winged trimotor light transport aircraft, naming each the Air Coach. Each had a fixed tailwheel undercarriage with the two outboard engined slung from the supporting bracing struts to the high wing. The first model was the K-1 Air Coach of late 1928 which was powered by three 65 hp (48 kW) Velie engines and accommodated four persons. The sole example NX71E first flew on 5 December 1928. It was later fitted with a single 330 hp (246 kW) J6-9 engine and a hopper for agricultural purposes. It crashed at Yuba City California in 1936.

The next Air Coach was the K-2 of 1929 which had a similar wing span but was lengthened by five feet to permit six persons to be carried. The K-2 was fitted with one 90 hp (67 kW) and two 60 hp (45 kW) LeBlond engines. Four examples were built. The K-3 was similar to the K-2 but was fitted with three 90 hp (67 kW) LeBlond engines. Two were built and two earlier machines converted to this standard. The K-4 designation was not used.

The K-5 Air Coach, also of 1929, had similar dimensions to the K-2 and K-3 but was fitted with three 100 hp (75 kW) five-cylinder Kinner K-5 engines. The extra power enabled heavier loads to be carried and in addition to eight new-build aircraft, one earlier aircraft was converted to this standard.

Kreutzer's operations were suspended in 1931 and no further development was undertaken. The firm was reorganized as the Air Transport Manufacturing Co in 1935 and a T-6 design was developed, but no production materialised.

== Operational history ==
The Air Coach series of aircraft were used by small air transport operators in the United States and in Mexico. At least one was modified for agricultural aviation and others were latterly acquired by private owners. The design featured a heated and ventilated cabin and shatterproof glass glazing.

The sole survivor N612A was originally a K-2, but was upgraded to K-3 and then to K-5 standard. It was sold to Mexico in 1931 as XB-AHO and was flown by La Compania Aeronautica De La Sierra on routes from Parral to local silver and other mining operations in inaccessible territory. It carried equipment and personnel to the mines and valuable ores on the return journey. It was sold in 1939 for operations from Chihuahua. After becoming derelict, it was recovered using pack animals and is now maintained airworthy by the private Golden Wings Air Museum near Minneapolis Minnesota.

== Variants ==
K-1
3 x 65 hp (48 kW) Velie M-5 engines Span 48' 6", length 28' 6" (1 built)
K-2
1 x 90 hp (67 kW) and 2 x 60 hp (45 kW) LeBlond engines. Span 48' 10", length 33' 6" (4 built)
K-3
3 x 90 hp (67 kW) LeBlond TD engines. Dimensions as K-2 (2 built and 2 conversions)
K-4
designation not used
K-5
3 x 100 hp (75 kW) five cylinder Kinner K5 engines (8 built)
T-6
3 x 100 hp (75 kW) five cylinder Kinner K5 engines
Air Transport T-6
Revived in 1935 by the General-Western Aero Corp Ltd. and Air Transport Mfg Co.

== Operators ==
- Navajo Airways, Arizona, USA;
- Wedell-Williams Air Service, Louisiana, USA

== Specifications (K-5) ==
Data from

General characteristics

- Crew: 2
- Capacity: 4 passengers or freight
- Length: 33 ft 6 in (10.21 m)
- Wingspan: 48 ft 10 in (14.88 m)
- Height: 8 ft 6 in (2.59 m)
- Wing area: 315 sq ft (29.3 m^{2})
- Airfoil: Göttingen 398
- Empty weight: 2,745 lb (1,245 kg)
- Gross weight: 4,433 lb (2,011 kg)
- Fuel capacity: 85 US gal (71 imp gal; 320 L)
- Powerplant: 3 × Kinner K5 five-cylinder radial engine, 100 hp (75 kW) each

Performance

- Maximum speed: 130 mph (210 km/h, 110 kn)
- Cruise speed: 110 mph (180 km/h, 96 kn)
- Stall speed: 45 mph (72 km/h, 39 kn)
- Range: 520 mi (840 km, 450 nmi)
- Service ceiling: 17,000 ft (5,200 m)
- Rate of climb: 950 ft/min (4.8 m/s)

== See also ==
Aircraft of comparable role, configuration, and era

- Navarro Chief
