= Kinner Envoy =

American monoplane first flown in 1934

C-7 Envoy
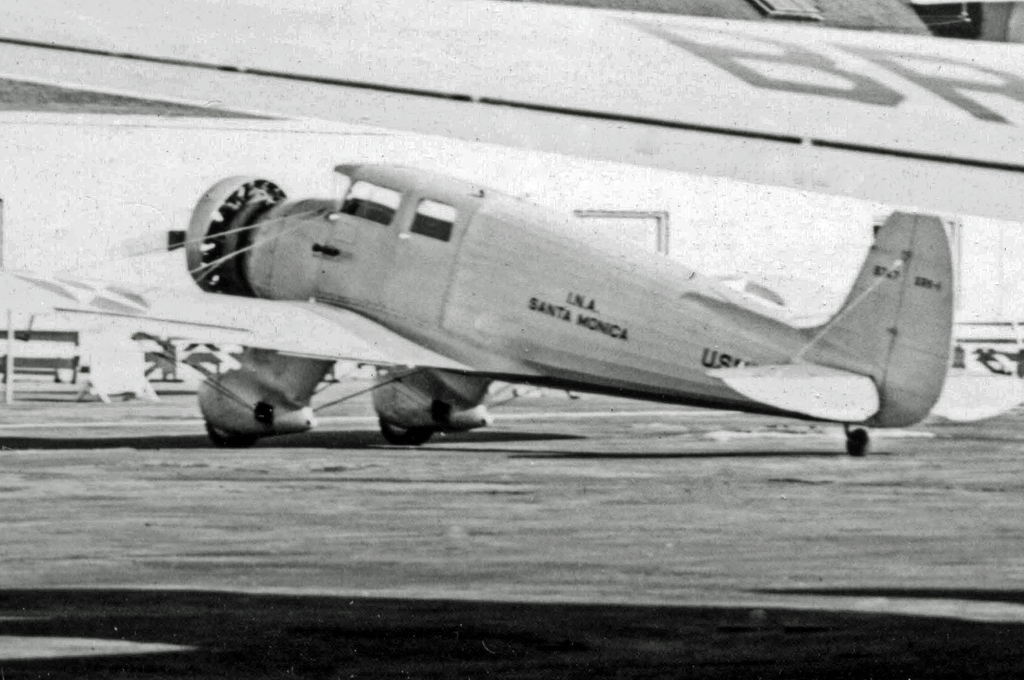
- Kinner XRK-1 of the United States Navy

General information
- Type: Four-seat cabin monoplane
- Manufacturer: Kinner Airplane & Motor Corporation
- Designer: Max Harlow and Harold Webb
- Status: no remaining examples
- Primary users: United States Navy civil owner pilots
- Number built: 8

History
- Manufactured: 1934-1936
- Introduction date: 1934
- First flight: 1934

The Kinner C-7 Envoy was an American four-seat cabin monoplane built by Kinner Airplane & Motor Corporation in the 1930s.

== Design and development ==
The Envoy was a four-seat version of the Sportwing. It had low wings fitted with wire bracing from fuselage points just below the cabin windows. The conventional, fixed tailwheel undercarriage was fitted with streamlined spats on the main gear. The low-set tailplane was braced by wires from the middle of the fin.

Four civil examples were completed from 1934. These were fitted with a 300 h.p. Kinner C-7 engine and were sold to civil pilot owners. The civil aircraft were followed in 1936 by three aircraft for the United States Navy (USN) for use in communications work and designated XRK-1. The USN machines served until the early years of World War II. The Imperial Japanese Navy evaluated a single example as the LXK.

When they were delivered the USN examples were fitted with a 340 h.p. Kinner R-1044-2 engine, but one example used for VIP transport was later fitted with a 400 h.p. Pratt & Whitney R-985-38 radial engine.

The C-7 was the last of Kinner's production models.

== Operators ==
United States

- United States Navy

== Specifications (XRK-1) ==
Sources : Swanborough, 1990, p. 502 and Aerofiles

General characteristics

- Crew: 1
- Capacity: 4
- Length: 28 ft 7 in (8.71 m)
- Wingspan: 39 ft 9 in (12.12 m)
- Empty weight: 2,550 lb (1,157 kg)
- Gross weight: 4,000 lb (1,814 kg)
- Powerplant: 1 × Kinner R-1044-2 , 340 hp (254 kW)

Performance

- Maximum speed: 171 mph (275 km/h, 149 kn)
- Cruise speed: 150 mph (240 km/h, 130 kn)
- Range: 700 mi (1,100 km, 610 nmi)

== See also ==
Related lists

- List of military aircraft of the United States
- List of United States Navy aircraft designations (pre-1962)
