= Kinner C-5 =

1930s American piston aircraft engine

C-5
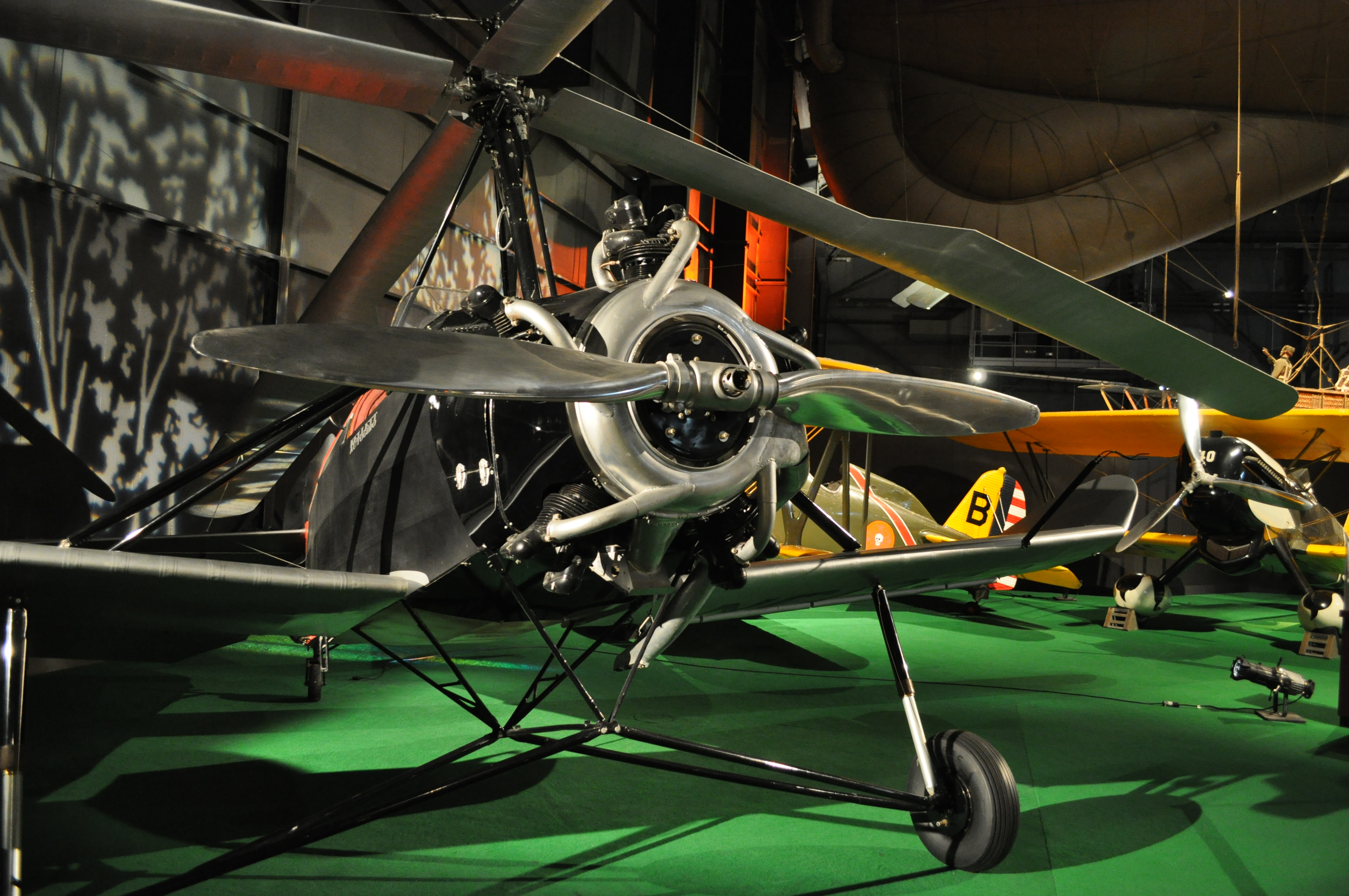
- Type: Radial engine
- Manufacturer: Kinner Airplane & Motor Corporation
- Developed from: Kinner R-5

The Kinner C-5 was an American five-cylinder radial engine for small general and sport aircraft of the 1930s.

== Design and development ==
The C-5 was a development of the earlier R-5 with greater power and dimensions. The main change was the increase in cylinder bore from 128 mm (5.0 in) to 143 mm (5.625 in) and an increase in cylinder stroke from 140 mm (5.5 in) to 145 mm (5.75 in). This led to a corresponding increase in displacement from 8.85 liters (540 cu in) to 11.71 liters (715 cu in).

The U.S. military designation was R-720.

== Applications ==
- Consolidated YPT-11B
- Kellett K-3
- Kinner P
- Stearman 6H Cloudboy
- Stearman YPT-9C
- Verville YPT-10D
- Waco OSO
- Waco OEC
- Waco ODC
- Waco OBF
- Waterman FlexWing

== Specifications ==
Data from Jane's All the World's Aircraft 1938

=== General characteristics ===
- Type: 5-cylinder air cooled radial
- Bore: 5.625 in (143 mm)
- Stroke: 5.75 in (145 mm)
- Displacement: 715 cu in (11.71 liters)
- Length: 34.8in (884 mm)
- Diameter: 50 in (1,270 mm)
- Dry weight: (dry) 420 lb (190 kg)

=== Components ===
- Valvetrain: 1 inlet and 1 exhaust valve per cylinder
- Fuel system: 1 Stromberg carburetor
- Fuel type: 73 octane
- Cooling system: Air

=== Performance ===
- Power output: maximum 245 hp at 2,200 rpm, cruise 210 hp at 1,900 rpm
- Compression ratio: 5.25:1
- Specific fuel consumption: 0.6 lb (273 gm) /hp/hr
- Oil consumption: 0.015 lb (7 gm) /hp/hr

== See also ==
Related lists

- List of aircraft engines
