= Williamson, Georgia =

- City
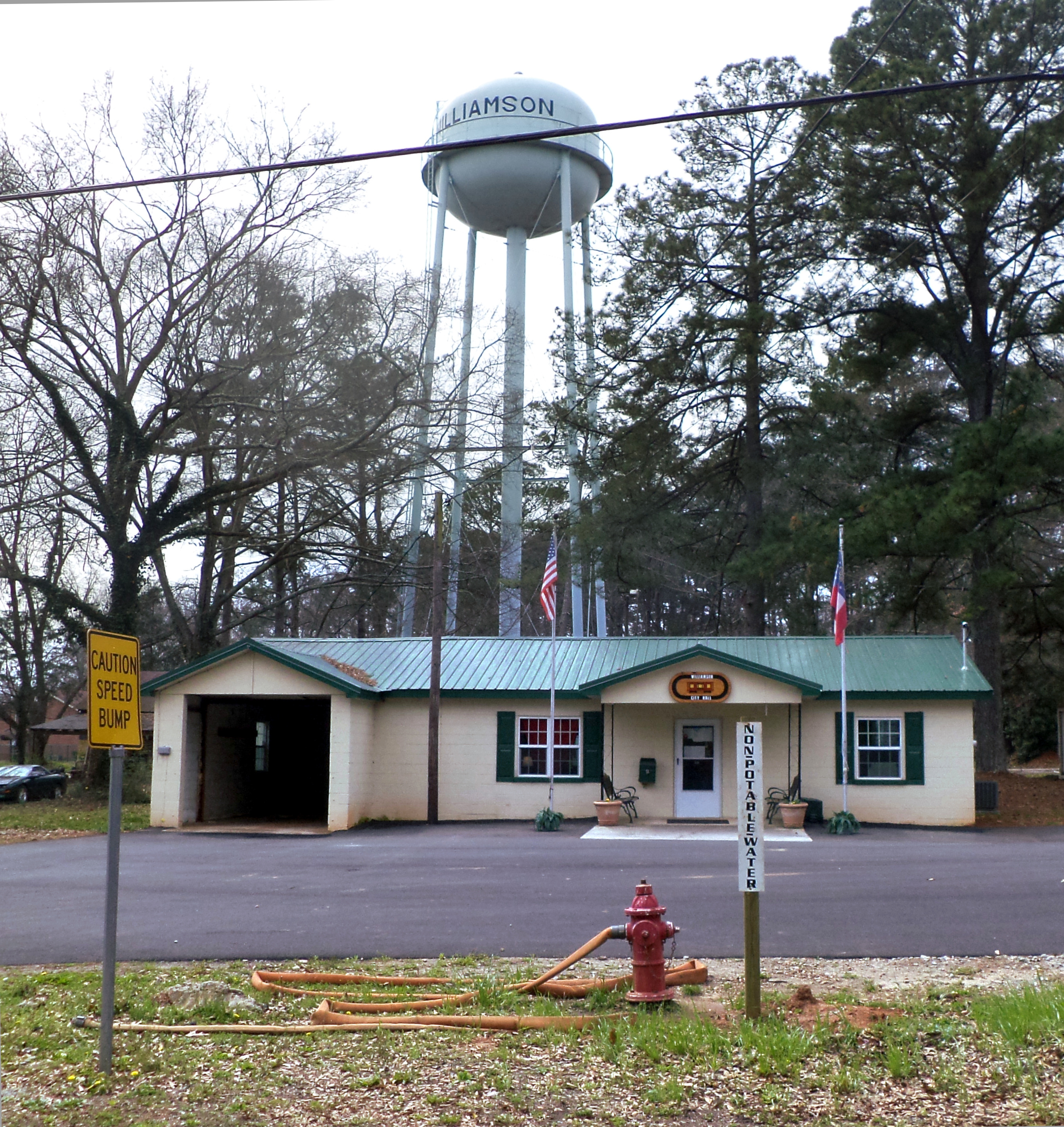
- Williamson City Hall
- Motto: "Cherish Our Past, Plan Our Future"
- Location in Pike County and the state of Georgia
- Coordinates: 33°10′47″N 84°21′47″W
- Country: United States
- State: Georgia
- County: Pike

Area
  - Total: 1.31 sq mi (3.40 km^{2})
  - Land: 1.31 sq mi (3.39 km^{2})
  - Water: 0.0039 sq mi (0.01 km^{2})
- Elevation: 922 ft (281 m)

Population (2020)
  - Total: 681
  - Density: 520.4/sq mi (200.93/km^{2})
- Time zone: UTC-5 (Eastern (EST))
  - Summer (DST): UTC-4 (EDT)
- ZIP code: 30292
- Area code: 770
- FIPS code: 13-83084
- GNIS feature ID: 0333435
- Website: cityofwilliamsonga.org

Williamson is a city in Pike County, Georgia, United States. The population was 681 in 2020.

== History ==
The community was named after Isaac Henry Williamson, an early settler.

The Georgia General Assembly incorporated Williamson as a town in 1908. Williamson was incorporated as a city in 1970.

== Geography ==
Williamson is located at 33°10′47″N 84°21′47″W (33.179743, -84.362976).

According to the United States Census Bureau, the town has a total area of 0.6 square miles (1.6 km^{2}), all land.

== Demographics ==
Historical population
Census	Pop.	Note	%±
1910	179		—
1920	249		39.1%
1930	226		−9.2%
1940	217		−4.0%
1950	211		−2.8%
1960	215		1.9%
1970	284		32.1%
1980	250		−12.0%
1990	295		18.0%
2000	297		0.7%
2010	352		18.5%
2020	681		93.5%
U.S. Decennial Census

As of the census of 2000, there were 297 people, 115 households, and 86 families residing in the town. By 2020, its population was 681.

== Education ==
Williamson Public Schools are part of the Pike County School District. The school district has one Pre-K building (lottery funded), one primary school (K-2), one elementary school (3–5), one middle school (6–8), a ninth grade academy and two high schools.

Michael Duncan is the Superintendent of Schools.

== Arts and culture ==
Williamson is home to the Candler Field Museum, established to recreate the old Atlanta airport as it existed in the 1920s and 1930s.

== Government ==
Williamson is an incorporated municipality and has a Mayor and City Council, a Planning Commission, and a Board of Appeals.

Steve Fry has served as the mayor of Williamson since 2009.
