= Kinner R-5 =

1930s American piston aircraft engine

R-5
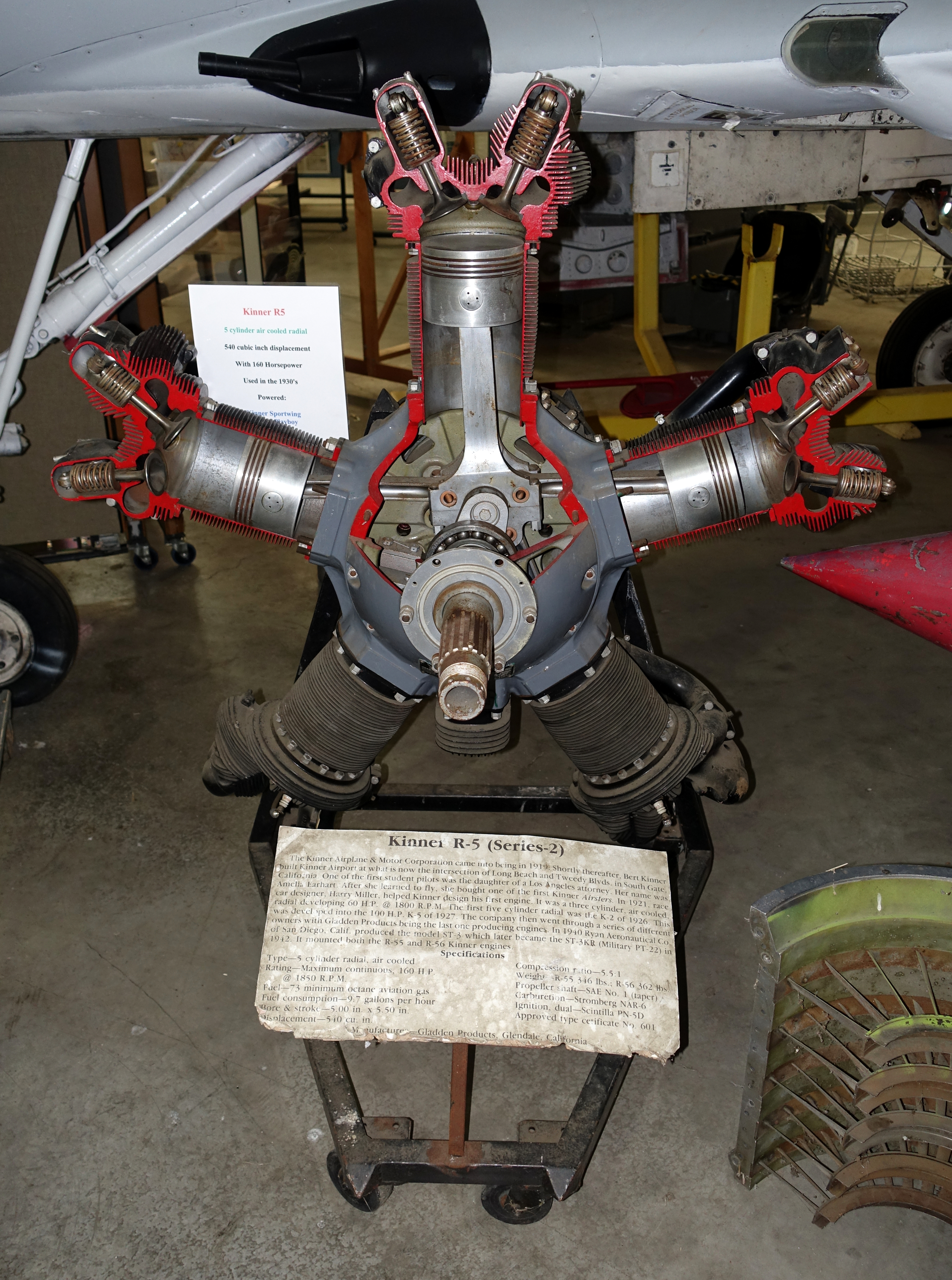
- Kinner R-5 (Series-2) engine, in the Oregon Air and Space Museum
- Type: Radial engine
- Manufacturer: Kinner Airplane & Motor Corporation
- Developed from: Kinner B-5
- Developed into: Kinner C-5

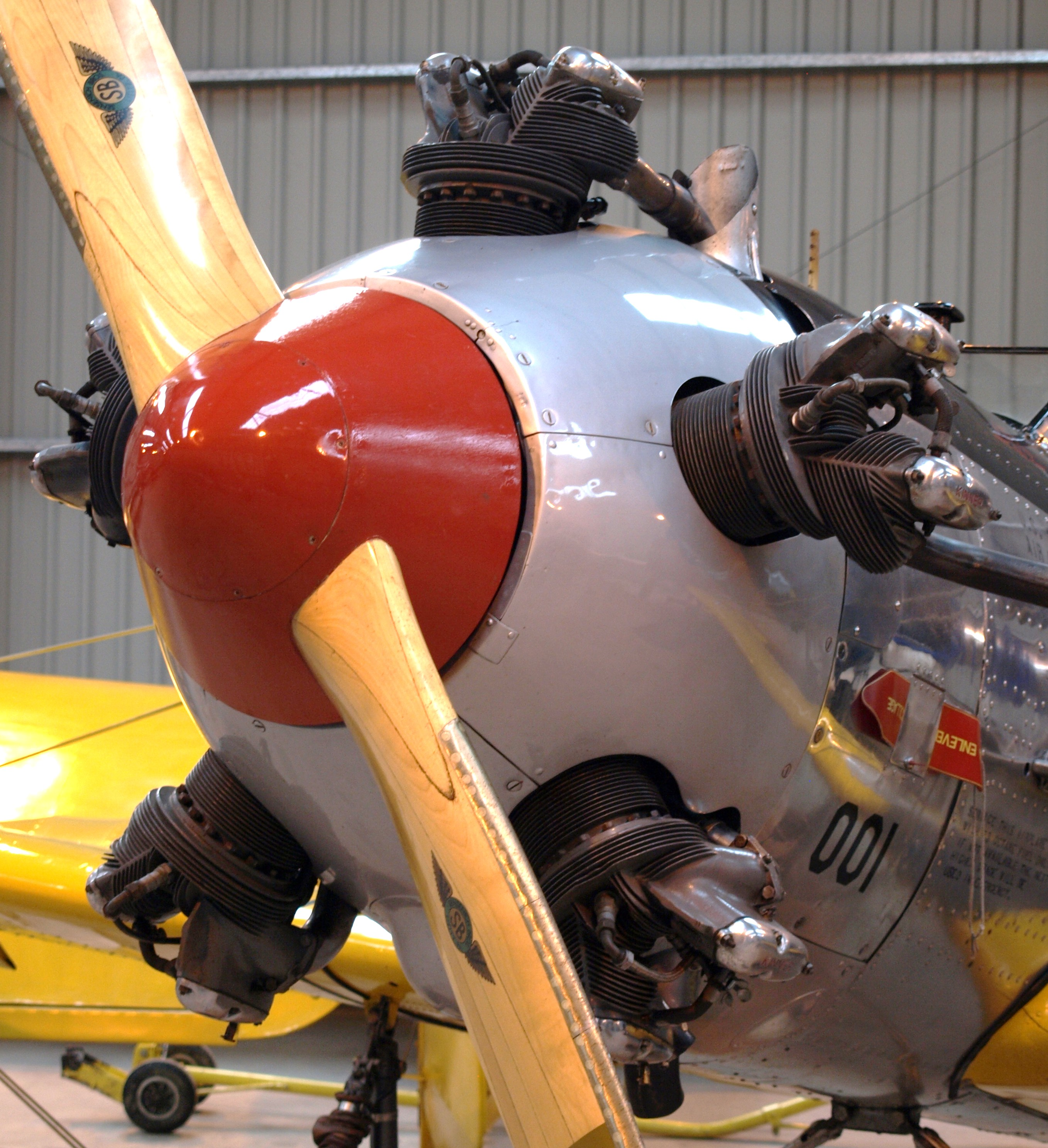
Kinner R-56 installed in a PT-22 Recruit

The Kinner R-5 is an American five-cylinder radial engine for light general and sport aircraft of the 1930s.

== Design and development ==
The R-5 was a development of the earlier Kinner B-5, with slightly greater power and dimensions. The main change was the increase in cylinder bore from 117 mm (4.625 in) to 127 mm (5 in) and an increase in piston stroke from 133.3 mm (5.25 in) to 139.7 mm (5.5 in). This led to a corresponding increase in displacement from 7.2 liters (441 cu in) to 8.8 liters (540 cu in). The R-5 was a rough running but reliable engine. Thousands of the R-5 and its derivatives were produced, powering many World War II trainer aircraft. Its military designation was R-540.

== Applications ==
Cam Harrod starts his 160 hp Kinner powered Finch Model R

- Fleet Finch Model R
- Howard DGA-18
- Kinner Sportwing
- Kinner Playboy
- Meyers OTW
- N2T Tutor
- Ryan PT-22 Recruit

== Variants ==
R-5
R-53
Rated at 175 hp (130 kW) at 2,100 rpm.
R-55
Rated at 160 hp (120 kW) at 1,850 rpm.
R-56
Rated at 160 hp (120 kW) at 1,850 rpm.

R-540-1
Military version of R-55
R-540-3
Military version of R-56

== Specifications (Kinner R-5) ==
Data from Jane's all the World's Aircraft 1938

=== General characteristics ===
- Type: 5-cylinder air cooled radial
- Bore: 5 in (130 mm)
- Stroke: 5.5 in (140 mm)
- Displacement: 540 cu in (8.8 L)
- Length: 32.3 in (820 mm)
- Height: 45.6 in (1,160 mm)
- Dry weight: 330 lb (150 kg)

=== Components ===
- Valvetrain: 1 inlet and 1 exhaust valve per cylinder
- Fuel system: 1 Stromberg carburetor
- Fuel type: 73 octane
- Oil system: Dry sump
- Cooling system: Air

=== Performance ===
- Power output: 160 hp (120 kW) at 1,850 rpm maximum, 113 hp (84 kW) hp at 1,800 rpm cruise
- Compression ratio: 5.5:1
- Power-to-weight ratio: 0.48 hp/lb

== See also ==
Related development

- Kinner B-5

Comparable engines

- Armstrong Siddeley Mongoose
- Shvetsov M-11
- Warner Super Scarab
- Wright R-540

Related lists

- List of aircraft engines
