= Lindbergh Boom =

1920s period of interest in aviation

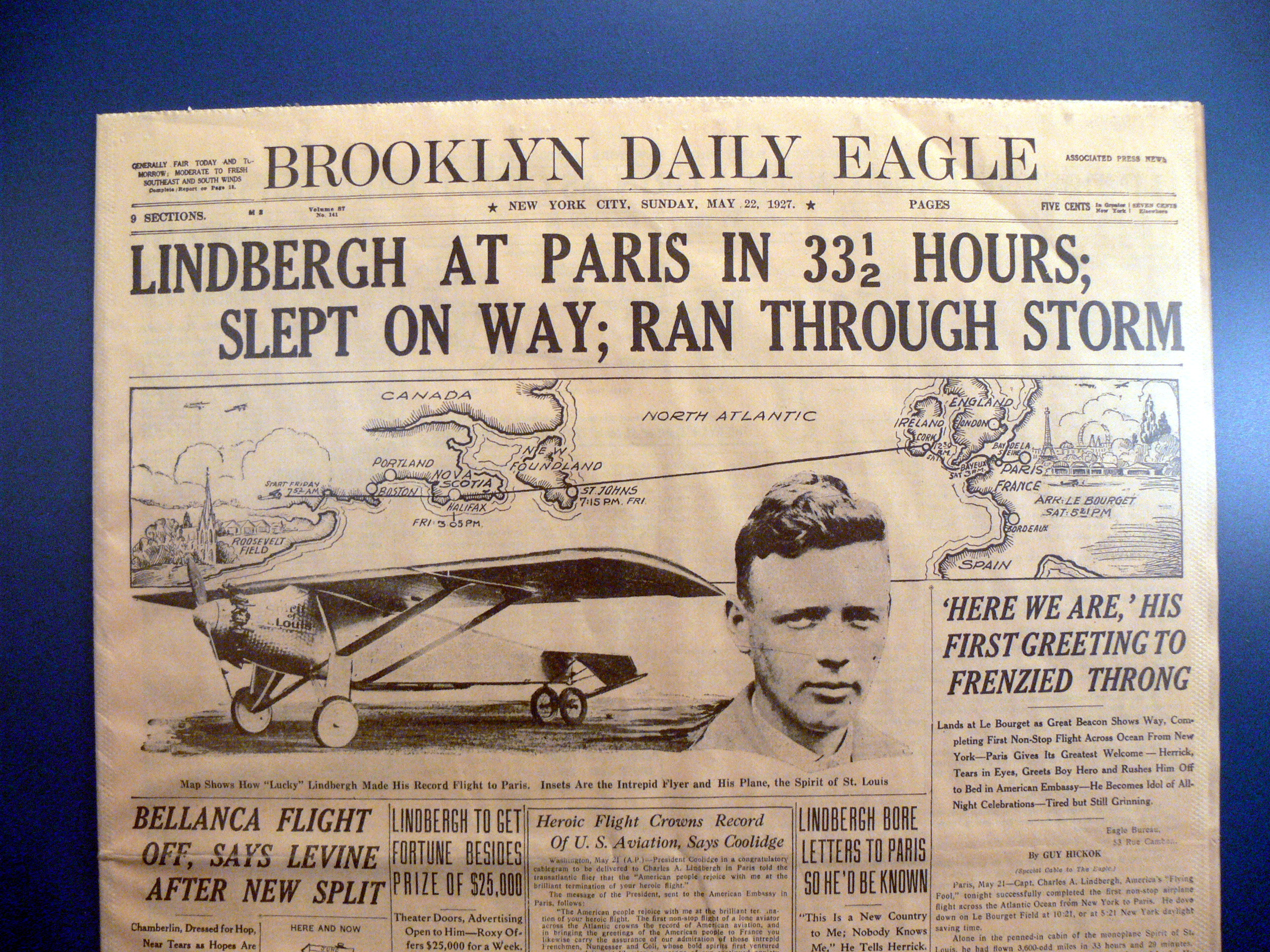
In May 1927, Lindbergh completed one of aviation's greatest challenges with great publicity worldwide.

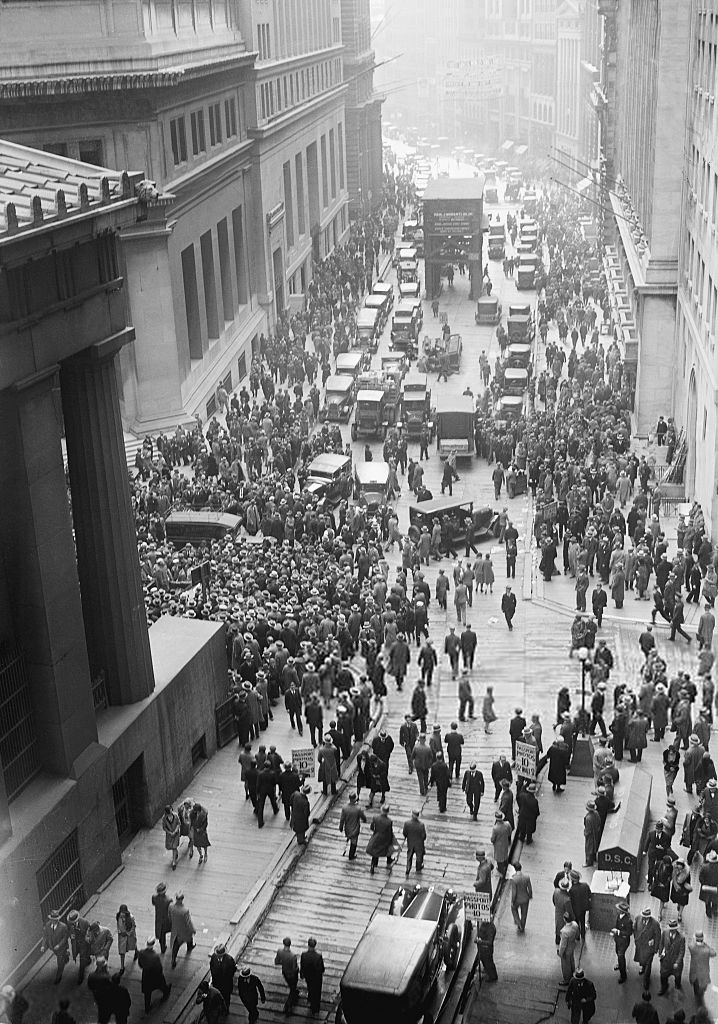
1929 Wall Street crash. A temporary, but abrupt, halt to the income source for the Lindbergh Boom

The Lindbergh Boom (1927–1929) is a period of rapid interest in aviation following the awarding of the Orteig Prize to Charles Lindbergh for his 1927 non-stop solo transatlantic flight in the Spirit of St. Louis. The Lindbergh Boom occurred during the interwar period between World War I and World War II, where aviation development was fueled by commercial interests rather than wartime necessity. During this period, dozens of companies were formed to create airlines, and aircraft for a new age in aviation. Many of the fledgling companies funded by stock went under as quick as they started as the stock that capitalized them plummeted in value following the Wall Street crash of 1929. The Great Depression dried up the market for new aircraft, causing many aircraft companies to go into bankruptcy or get consolidated by larger entities. Air racing, record attempts, and barnstorming remained popular, as aviators tried to recapture the prizes and publicity of Lindbergh's Transatlantic flight.

== The Lindbergh Boom ==
Publicity surrounding Lindbergh and his flight boosted the aviation industry and made a skeptical public take air travel seriously. Within a year of his flight, a quarter of Americans (an estimated thirty million) personally saw Lindbergh and the Spirit of St. Louis. Over the remainder of 1927 applications for pilot's licenses in the U.S. tripled, the number of licensed aircraft quadrupled, and U.S. airline passengers grew between 1926 and 1929 by 3,000% from 5,782 to 173,405.

== Contributing factors ==
Lindbergh's flight was the peak of several other factors that lead to the boom. This included:

- movie reels and newspaper-funded record attempts for publicity
- the introduction of reliable, high-power-to-weight engines, such as the Wright Whirlwind
- the exhaustion of World War I-vintage aircraft engines and airframes
- the start of contract air mail routes in the United States, which subsidized new airline service
- the introduction of all-metal airliners like the Ford Trimotor that could carry enough revenue passengers to be profitable
- the completion of the lighted airway
- publicity events such as the National Air Races, and the nationwide Ford National Reliability Air Tour
- airplane service and cargo flights to the Caribbean to skirt the Volstead Act
- an influx of capital from a booming stock market

== The Boom companies ==
- Ace Aircraft Manufacturing Corporation 1929–1930
- American Aeronautical Corporation – founded to license build Savoia-Marchetti seaplanes in 1928. The company folded after 1933.
- Associated Aircraft Corporation 1929–1929
- Air Capital Manufacturing Company 1929–1929
- Beach Aviation Company 1927–1928
- Bowlby Airplane Company 1929–1929
- Braley Aircraft Company 1929–1931
- Buckley Aircraft Co. 1929–1930
- Continental Aircraft Company 1929–1929
- Geselle Aircraft Company 1927–1927
- Hilton Aircraft Company 1929–1930
- Jayhawk Aircraft Company 1929–1930
- Knoll Aircraft Company 1928–1929
- Laird Aircraft Company 1928–1928
- Lark Aircraft Company 1928–1928
- Lea Aircraft Company 1930–1930
- Lear Aircraft Company 1929–1930
- Mason Aircraft Company, founded in 1928, and built the Mason Greater Meteor, a near clone of the Spirit of St. Louis for record attempts.
- Metal Aircraft Corporation 1929–1929
- Miller Aircraft 1927–1927
- Mooney Aircraft Company 1929–1930
- C.M. Mulkins Company 1929–1929
- Okay Airplane Company 1929–1929
- Poyer Motor Company 1929–1929
- Quick Air Motors 1928–1929
- Roydon Aircraft Company 1930–1930
- Red Bird Aircraft Company 1929–1929
- Rawdon-Burnham Company 1931–1931
- Shilberg Aeroplane Company 1928–1928
- Self Aircraft Corporation 1929–1929
- St. Louis Aircraft Corporation, came out of dormancy in 1928 to produce the St. Louis C2 Cardinal. Production ceased after the start of the Depression.
- Steamboat Aircraft Corporation 1928–1928
- Straughan Aircraft Corporation
- Pawnee and Woodlawn 1932–1933
- Swift Aircraft Corporation 1927–1929
- Sullivan Aircraft Manufacturing Corporation 1929–1930
- Supreme/Stone Propeller Company 1929–1930
- Vanos Aircraft Corporation 1929–1929
- Wichita Airplane Manufacturing Company 1929–1929
- Watkins Aircraft Company 1929–1930
- Vulcan Aircraft Corporation, developed the Vulcan American Moth Monoplane. Company sold to Davis Aircraft, with production ending by 1932.
- Wichita Imblum Aero Corporation 1929–1929
- Yellow Air Cab Company 1929–1930
- Yunker Aircraft Company 1929–1930

== Consolidation ==
Companies were consolidating Lindbergh Boom start-ups at a rapid rate. Some, like Curtiss-Wright, went on a buying spree before the market crash and struggled to maintain control afterward. Others like the Detroit Aircraft Corporation were dissolved.

== See also ==
- The "Pioneer Era" (1900–1914)
- Roaring Twenties
