= Enea Bossi Sr. =

Pioneer aviation engineer and designer

Enea Bossi
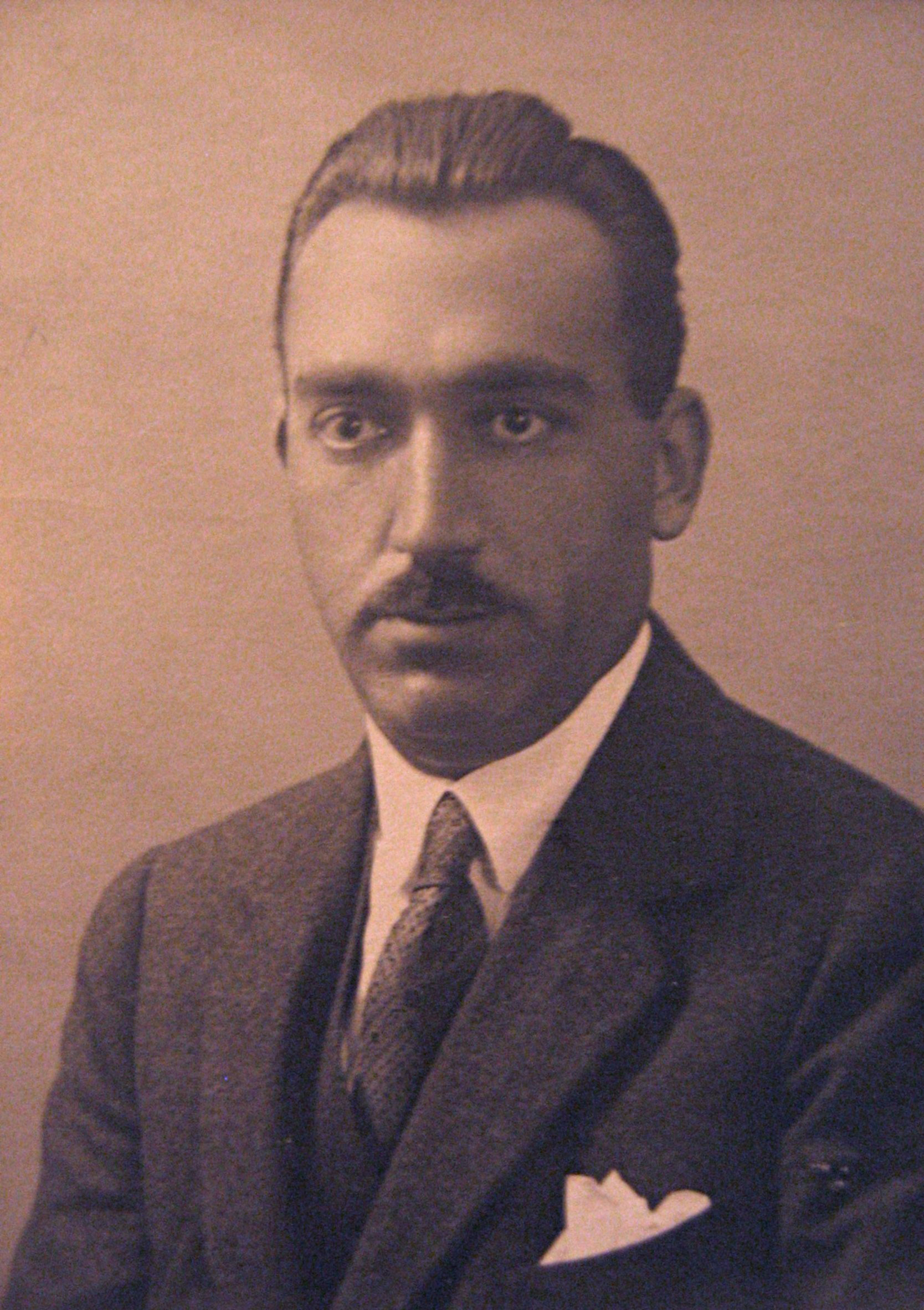
- Portrait of Enea Bossi
- Born: Enea Bossi; March 29, 1888; Milan, Italy
- Died: January 9, 1963 (aged 74); Dayton, Ohio, U.S.
- Known for: Budd BB-1 Pioneer; Pedaliante
- Spouse: Flora Kehrer

Enea Bossi Sr. (March 29, 1888 – January 9, 1963) was an Italian-American aerospace engineer and aviation pioneer. He is best known for designing the Budd BB-1 Pioneer, the first stainless steel aircraft, and the Pedaliante airplane, disputably credited with the first fully human-powered flight.

== Personal life ==
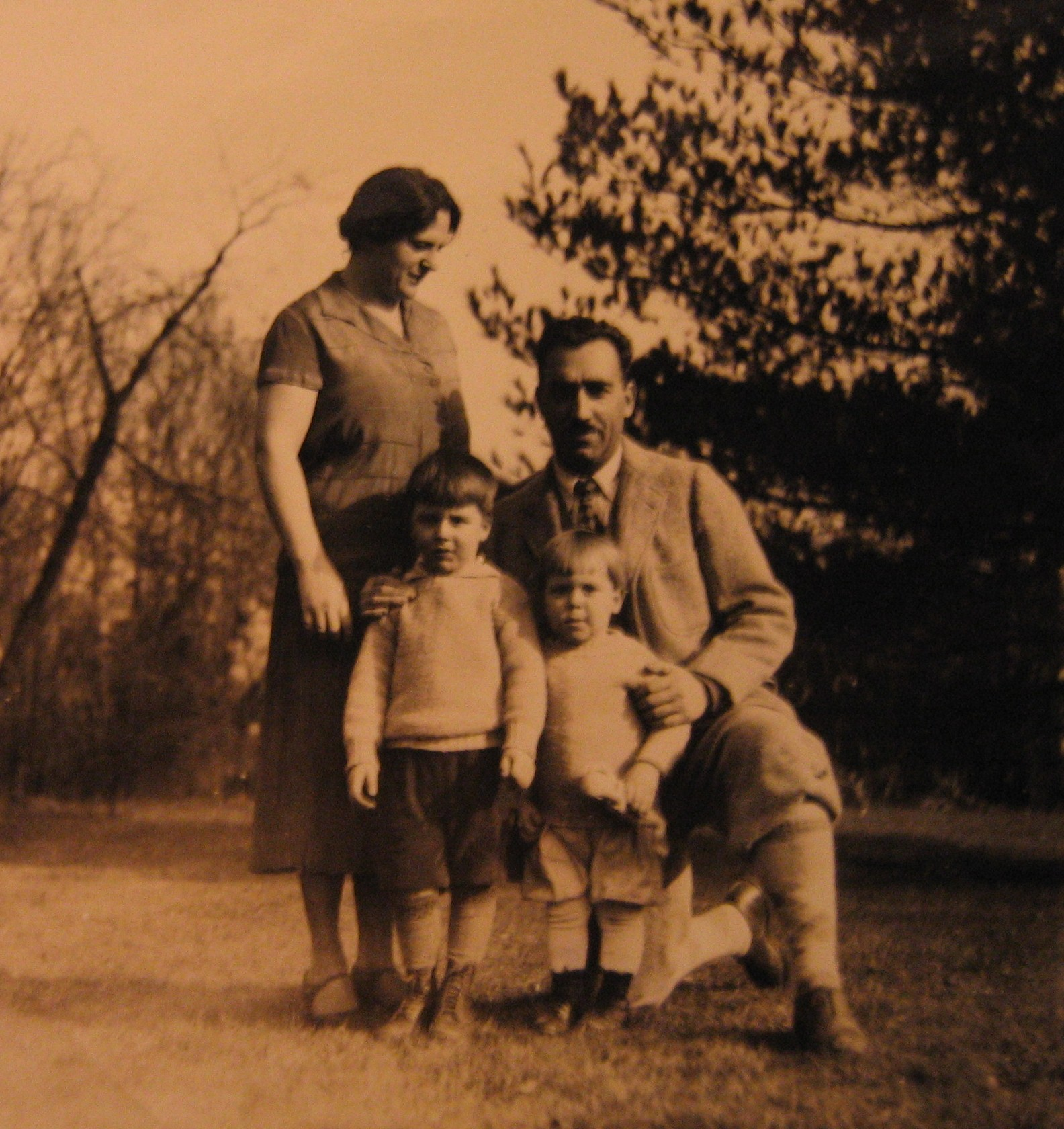
Enea Bossi with wife, Flora, and two sons Enea and Charles

Enea Bossi was born in Milan, Italy. He emigrated to the United States on the RMS Oceanic from Cherbourg, France, on July 20, 1914, subsequently residing in Great Neck, New York. He spoke fluent Italian, French, and English. Bossi petitioned for naturalization in 1925 and became a naturalized United States citizen on March 16, 1926; his two sons retained their inherited Italian citizenship, jus sanguines, as well their American citizenship, jus soli.

Bossi married Flora Kehrer, a Swiss German from Lausanne who had been sent away by a new stepmother to the United States immediately prior to the outbreak of World War I and was living with her aunt and uncle in Connecticut. The two met through Enea Bossi's professional relationship with her uncle, George Boldt. Flora and Enea eloped against the wishes of Flora's guardians. The couple had two children, Charles Bossi (1922, New York City – 1989, Ohio) and Enea Wilbur Bossi. (1924, Montclair, New Jersey – 1999, Lansdale, Pennsylvania). They ultimately resided on Upper Mountain Avenue in Montclair and maintained a country house in Lansdale, Pennsylvania.

== Professional career ==
Bossi graduated from the Istituto Tecnico in Lodi, Italy, in 1907, specializing in physics and mathematics. The Wright brothers' Flyer, having successfully flown in December 1903, impressed Bossi so much that he devoted himself to aviation, becoming the second licensed pilot in Italy. Financed by his father, in 1908 he designed and built his own plane, modeled after the Wright Flyer. Bossi also used the plane to teach both himself and Giuseppe M. Bellanca how to fly. The design won a silver medal the following year at the first international aviation meeting in Reims, France. The plane, built in Bossi's own factory, was the first successful plane to be designed in Italy.

In early December 1909, the first flight of an Italian-designed and built aircraft was successfully completed alongside fellow engineers Giuseppe M. Bellanca and Paolo Invernizzi. Also in 1909, Bossi developed the first landing gear braking system as well as the Italian Navy's first seaplane.

During the early 1910s, Bossi served as an Italian representative of Curtiss Aeroplane and Motor Company – securing rights for local license production of the Curtiss Model F by the Zari brothers, who built eight examples at their workshop in Bovisaa (today a district of Milan). The first of these was demonstrated to the Italian Navy on Lake Como on September 22, 1914. During this decade, Bossi also worked for the Aviation Corps, assisting the Italian government with building and organizing its naval air forces.

During World War I, Bossi served both as a bomber pilot and as a flight instructor for the Italian Navy. Due to the economic and social difficulties in Italy following the war, in 1918, Bossi emigrated to the United States, where he eventually became a naturalized citizen. In the 1920s, Bossi worked on a number of devices relating to fuel systems – leading to work in his later years on modern aerial refueling systems.

In 1927, Bossi was a co-founder of the company Société Continentale Parker in France together with Robert Deté, Louis Paulhan and Pierre Prier. The purpose was to transfer surface treatment technologies for the growing aerospace industry to Europe. Using his relationships he brokered a license from Parker Rust-Proof in Detroit (Parkerizing) and in a later step the distribution rights of Udylite Corp for specialty chemicals in electroplating. The company later became the European market leader in surface treatment via its successor organizations Chemetall GmbH and Coventya GmbH.

=== American Aeronautical Corporation ===
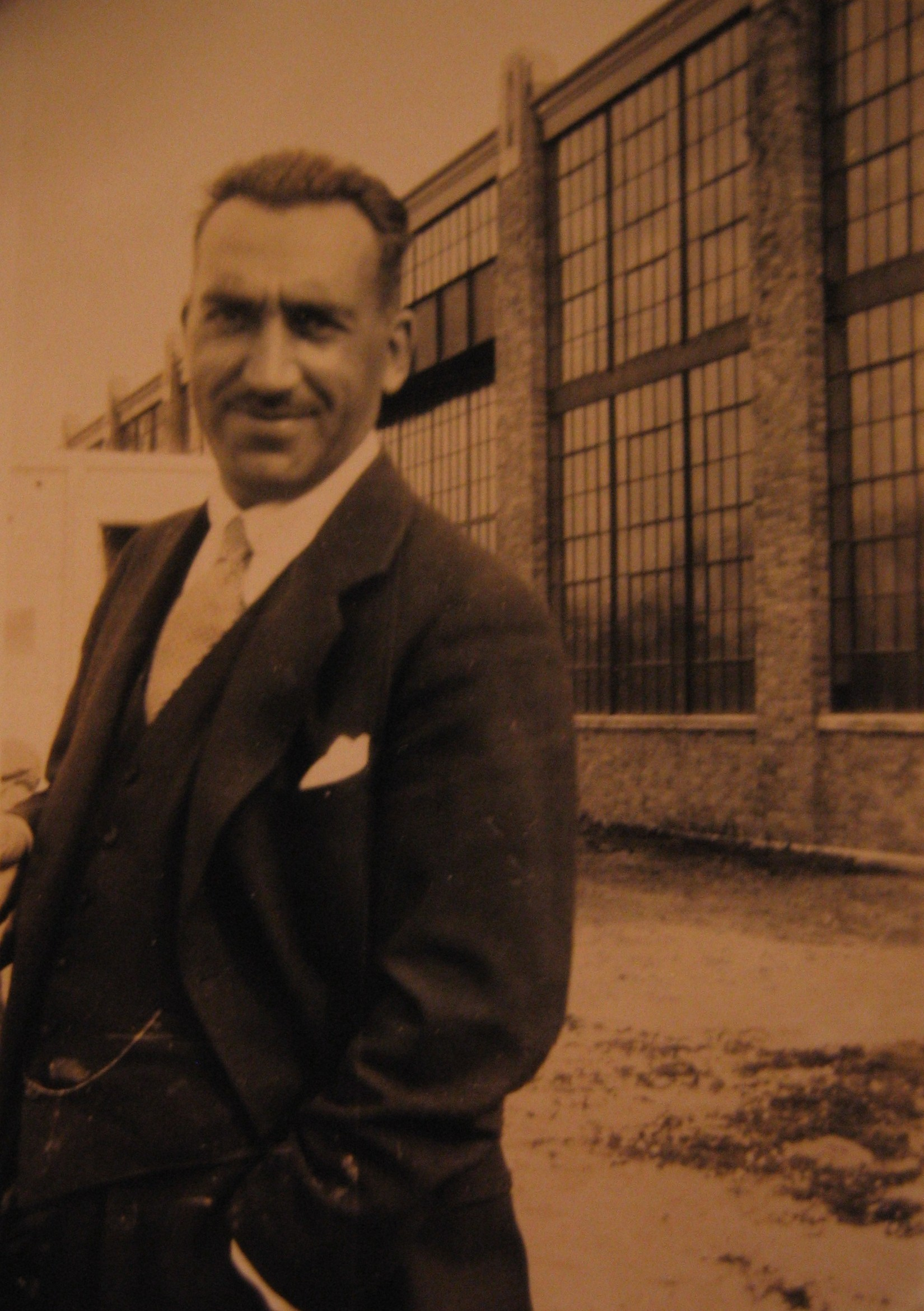
Bossi in front of the AAC factory in Port Washington, New York

In October 1928, Bossi founded the American Aeronautical Corporation (AAC), officially located at 730 Fifth Avenue in Port Washington, New York, to build Savoia-Marchetti seaplanes under license. Licenses were acquired for both the S-55 and the S-56 and both were tested at the Miller Army Air Field, but only the latter made it to production. The S-56 became the first plane used by the New York City Police Department, which used it to enforce flying regulations, assist with sea rescues, and to chase rum-runners during the Prohibition era. A follow-up design, the more-powerful S-56B, proved even more successful. Whereas the prices for the S-56 and S-56B were modest for the time, the Great Depression caused sales to drop significantly by 1933. Two original AAC S-56 planes exist today, one of which is on display at the Cradle of Aviation Museum in Garden City, New York.

Bossi's work was not without its setbacks. In early 1930, he survived the crash of an experimental S-56 off Port Washington which claimed the life of test pilot Peter Talbot. Bossi was rescued by the Coast Guard's ship CG-162.

=== Budd Company ===
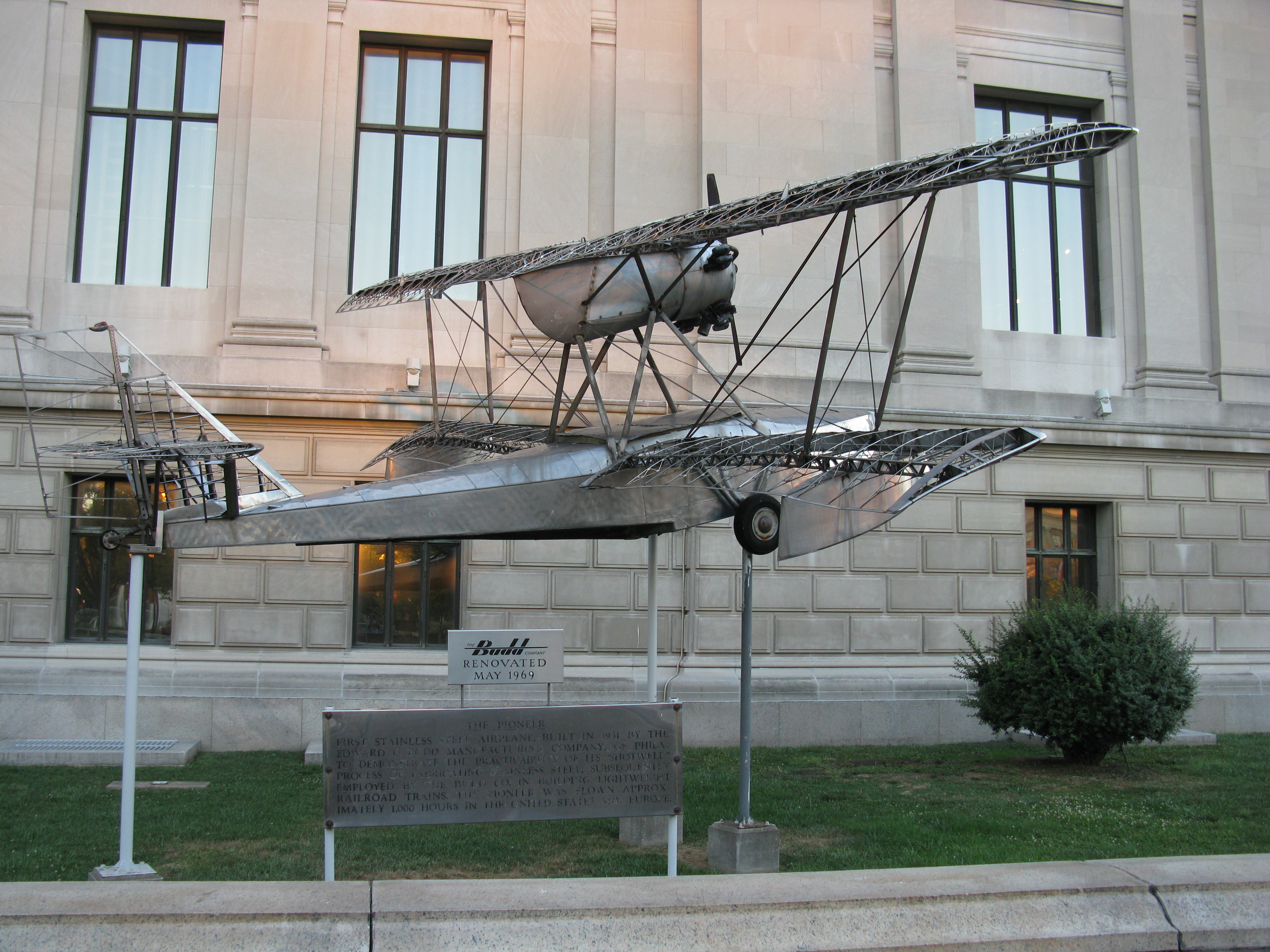
Budd BB-1 Pioneer in front of the Franklin Institute

The Edward G. Budd Manufacturing Corporation, of Philadelphia, Pennsylvania, was a major manufacturer of railroad cars, which resulted in significant experience in working with stainless steel. In 1930, the company made its first foray into the aviation industry by signing contracts to manufacture aircraft wheels and stainless steel wing ribs. A close friend of Edward Budd, Enea Bossi joined the company as the head of stainless steel research to supervise the design and construction of the 4-seat Budd BB-1 Pioneer – the first aircraft with a structure built out of stainless steel. Occurring in 1931, this was the first aircraft for the Budd Company. Built under Restricted License NR749, its design utilized concepts developed for the Savoia-Marchetti S-31 and was powered by a single 210 horsepower (160 kW) Kinner C-5 motor.

The stainless steel construction process for the BB-1 was patented in 1942. At the time, stainless steel construction was not considered practicable, and only one airplane was built. In 1934, it was stripped of its fabric covering and mounted outside the Franklin Institute in Philadelphia, where it remains to this day as the longest continuous display of any airplane. The plane has been memorialized in the children's book Spirited Philadelphia Adventure by Deirdre Cimino. In 1931, Bossi sold the controlling interest of the AAC to Dayton Airplane Engine Company. The success which came from the technical innovations of the BB-1 prompted the Budd Company to employ Bossi as its European representative.

=== Pedaliante ===
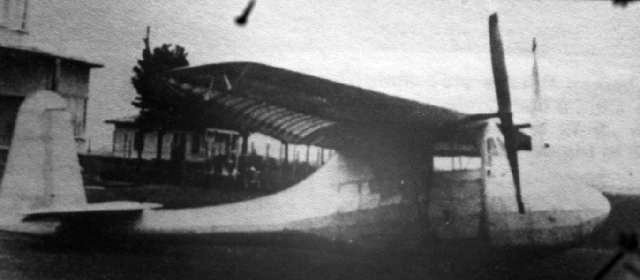
The Pedaliante

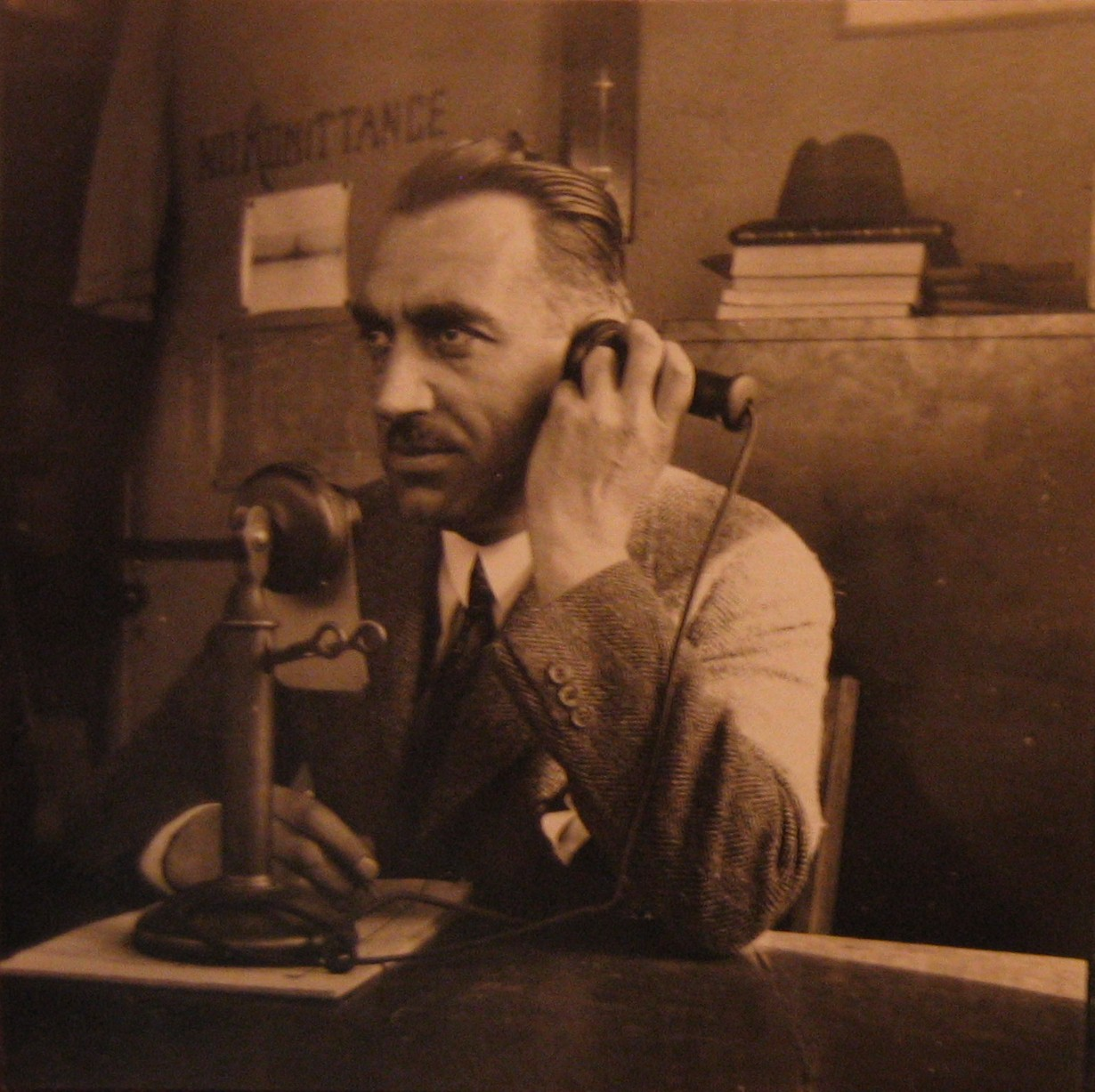
Enea Bossi in the 1930s

In 1932, Bossi heard of an airplane which had successfully flown while powered only by a 1 hp (0.75 kW) engine. This prompted Bossi to calculate the minimum power that a manned aircraft would need to fly. The calculation yielded a value of approximately 0.94 hp (0.70 kW), which convinced Bossi that Human-powered flight might be possible. During a trip to Philadelphia, Bossi tested the speed at which a glider would take off under tow. The experiment consisted of hiring a professional bicyclist to tow a glider. A spring scale was attached to the tow line to sense the force exerted by the bicyclist. This same experiment procedure was later repeated as part of the development of the Gossamer Condor and the Gossamer Albatross. The results confirmed that a speed at which the necessary lift could be obtained was indeed attainable.

A second experiment conducted during a trip to Paris involved a propeller-driven bicycle designed by Bossi. The test rider achieved a speed of 23 miles (37 km) per hour, but one drawback was noted: the gyroscopic effect of the propeller generated so much torque that the bicycle became unstable. Bossi concluded, erroneously, that a successful human-powered aircraft would therefore require two counter-rotating propellers to cancel out the effects of torque – similar to the design of a helicopter. In light of these findings, Bossi decided to design an aircraft incorporating this difficult requirement.

In 1933, the Frankfurt Polytechnische Gesellschaft (Frankfurt Polytechnic Society) offered a prize to promote human-powered flight. Due to the newly formed Rome-Berlin axis, similar political and military events were staged during the initial period in both Italy and Germany to help strengthen that bond. To this end, in 1936, the Italian government initiated an equivalent contest: offering 100,000 lire for a 1 km (0.62 mi) human-powered flight made by an Italian citizen. Bossi was aware that he could not receive the prize due to his American citizenship, but he opted to attempt to win it, anyway.

Bossi's design for the contest was named the Pedaliante, Italian for "Pedal Glider" – so named because it utilized conventional glider configuration and construction. The design was introduced in 1937 and Vittorio Bonomi, an Italian sailplane manufacturer, was contracted to build the plane. Bossi and Bonomi enlisted Emilio Casco to pilot the Pedaliante. Casco was a major in the Italian Army and a very strong bicyclist. After several weeks of trials in early 1936, Casco took off in the Pedaliante and flew approximately 300 feet (91 m) completely under his own power, marking the first achievement of an aircraft obtaining and sustaining flight completely via human power. Although subsequent calculations have verified that this flight was physically possible, most agree that it was Casco's considerable physical strength and endurance which performed the accomplishment; not a feat which could be attained by a typical person.

Incorporating a catapult launch to a height of 30 feet (9.1 m), the Pedaliante made a flight on September 13, 1936, which traveled several hundred meters. On March 18, 1937, at Cinisello airport near Milan, the plane was launched at a height of 29.5 feet (9.0 m) and Casco successfully pedaled the craft for its full 0.62 miles (1.00 km). This set a world record for human-powered flight, but as a catapult launch was not permitted in the rules of the competition, the Pedaliante did not win the prize for which it was designed. The plane was retired the following year having made a total 80 flights – 43 without the assistance of a catapult launch. At this time, the Mufli and the Pedaliante were the most advanced Human-powered aircraft ever built.

== Later work ==
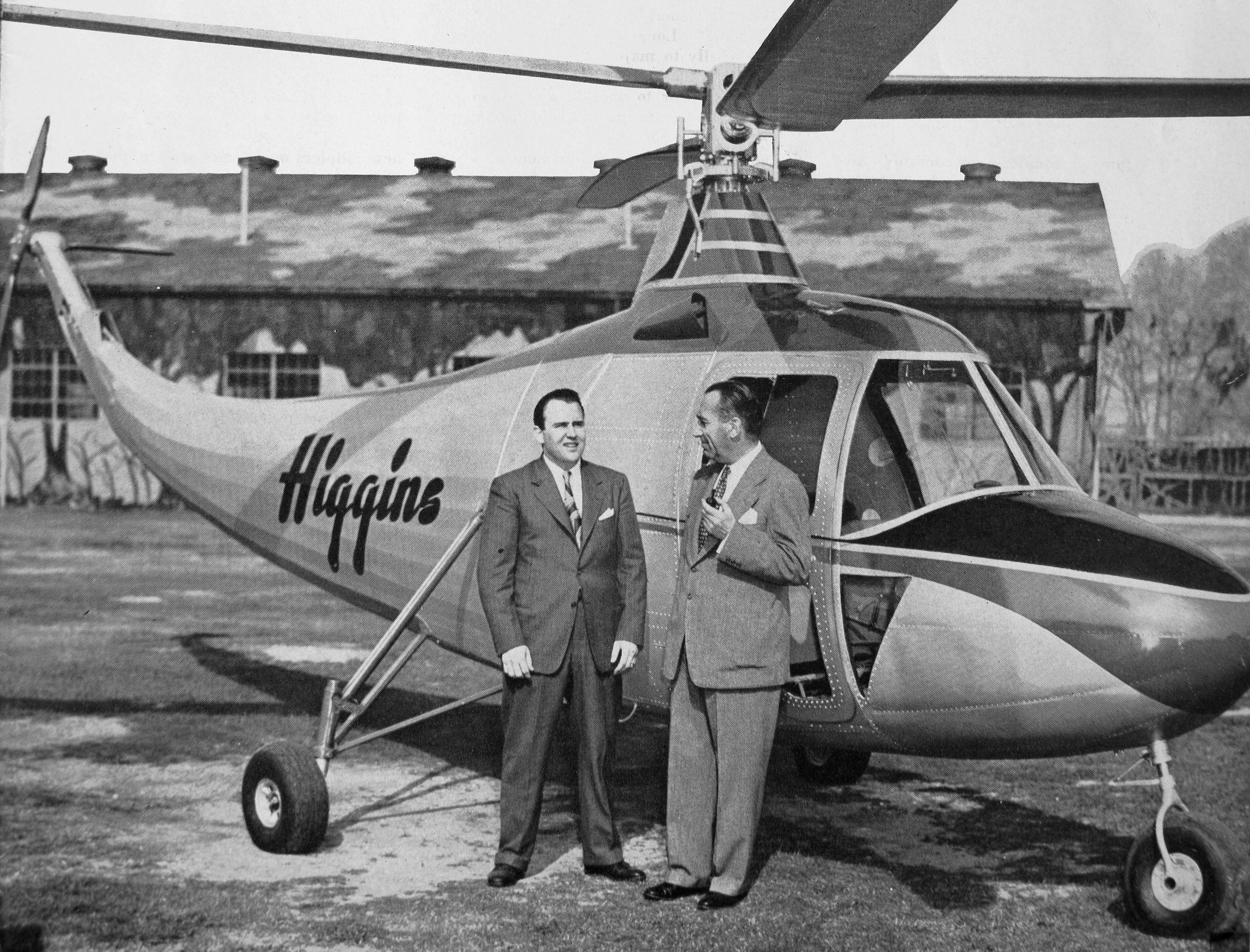
Enea Bossi and son Charles alongside the Higgins EB-1 helicopter

Initially developed at Delgado Trades School and completed by Enea Bossi, the two-place side-by-side single-rotor Higgins EB-1 helicopter was completed in 1943 and built by Higgins Industries, Inc., of New Orleans, Louisiana. Plans for larger versions were terminated following the downturn in the military aviation industry following the end of World War II. The fuselage was covered in its entirety by a metallic skin, with the tail covered in fabric. A two-bladed vertical tail rotor was included in its design to counter the effects of torque, and the landing gear was configured in a fixed tricycle form. The four-bladed main rotor consisted of two pairs of blades mounted one above the other. The interior featured controls similar to those of a conventional airplane.

Bossi further developed helicopter technology, particularly with regard to contra-rotating dual propellers and tail rotors – work which was also, to a limited degree, furthered by his two sons.

Bossi, a resident of West Orange, New Jersey, died on January 9, 1963, at the age of 74 at Miami Valley Hospital in Dayton, Ohio, while visiting his youngest son Charles, Charles's wife Thelma and Grand-Children Charles and Ronald. He is interred at David's Cemetery in Kettering, Ohio. Dayton, Ohio.
