= Budd BB-1 Pioneer =

BB-1 Pioneer
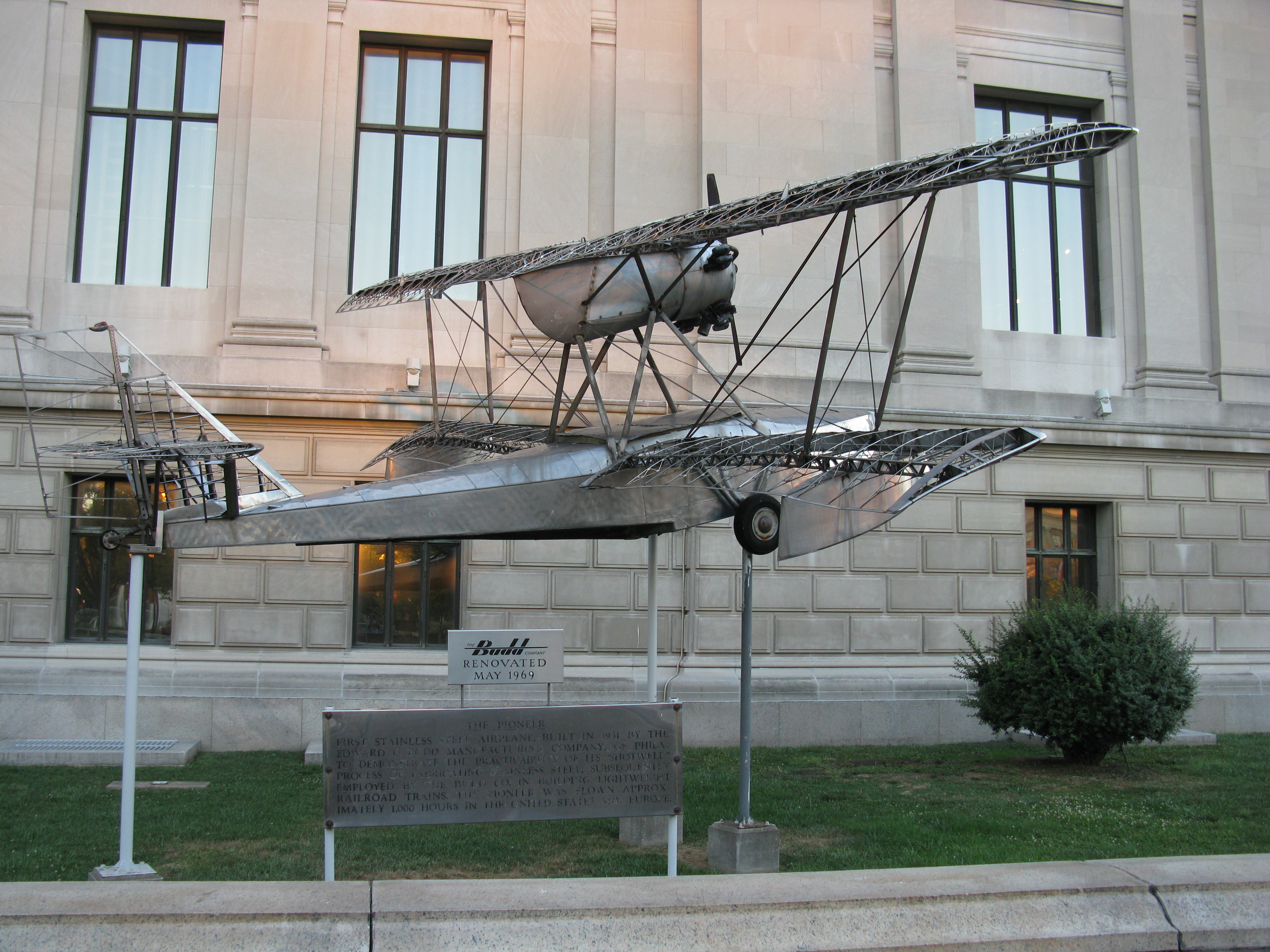
- The Pioneer in front of the Franklin Institute

General information
- Type: Experimental flying boat
- National origin: United States
- Manufacturer: Budd Company
- Number built: 1

History
- First flight: 1931

The Budd BB-1 Pioneer was an experimental United States flying boat of the 1930s utilizing the Savoia-Marchetti S.56 design. Its framework was constructed entirely of stainless steel, using the shotweld method of welding that alloy.

== Development ==
By 1930 the Budd Company was a national leader in construction of railway vehicles containing considerable amounts of stainless steel. Anxious to expand this expertise into other areas, company founder Edward G. Budd hired Enea Bossi to design and construct a flying boat of shot-welded stainless steel sheet and strip. They contracted with the Italian aircraft company Savoia-Marchetti for the use of the S.56 design. The S.56 was a single-engine three-seat flying boat. The Italian company granted licenses for construction of three units in the US, one to Budd and the others to other companies.

The resulting BB-1 was a biplane flying boat, with the lower wing attached near the top of the hull and the upper wing held high above, with a single Kinner C-5 radial engine mounted on the aircraft centerline between the wings. Wheels mounted on the sides of the hull were retracted upwards during water landings. The single tailwheel was not retractable. The pilot and two passengers rode in an open cockpit near the bow.

The prototype BB-1 first flew from the Budd Factory airfield, a field northwest of Philadelphia (Latitude 40.11/West Longitude 75.04). The field is still visible, although not used as a landing strip.

Although the Pioneer was the first American airplane to be made of stainless steel, it did not go into production. Another stainless steel amphibian, the Fleetwings Sea Bird was the first to go into production, with one prototype and five production units manufactured.

== Operational history ==
The BB-1 Pioneer first flew in 1931. Flight tests showed it to be typical in performance and challenging to handle on the water. The aircraft logged about 1,000 flying hours on tours of the US and Italy.

In 1935 its fabric and lower wing were removed, and it was placed on permanent display outside the Franklin Institute in Philadelphia, Pennsylvania.

== Specifications ==
Data from

General characteristics

- Crew: 1
- Capacity: 3 passengers
- Length: 25 ft 8 in (7.82 m)
- Wingspan: 34 ft 1 1/2 in (10.401 m)
- Height: 10 ft 3 in (3.12 m)
- Wing area: 292 sq ft (27.1 m^{2})
- Empty weight: 1,749 lb (793 kg)
- Gross weight: 3,300 lb (1,497 kg)
- Powerplant: 1 × Kinner C-5 5-cylinder radial engine, 210 hp (160 kW)
