= Buckley F-1 =

F-1

General information
- Type: Passenger monoplane
- National origin: United States of America
- Manufacturer: Buckley Aircraft Co.
- Number built: 1

History
- Manufactured: 1929

The Buckley F-1 "Witchcraft" was an all-metal, two-seat monoplane built by the short-lived Buckley Airplane Company.

== Design and development ==
The Buckley F-1 was one of two aircraft types built by the Buckley Aircraft company in Wichita, Kansas at the beginning of the Great Depression. The project was developed with a German engineer, using corrugated aluminum construction with steel tube framing.

The F-1 was an all-metal aircraft with a faired conventional landing gear. The aircraft featured an enclosed cabin and corrugated aluminum construction on the wing and tail surfaces. The aircraft was built without mock-ups or prototypes and was found to have no room for the pilot's feet. The wing spar had to be cut, modified and re-welded to accommodate a pilot.

== Specifications (Buckley F-1) ==
Data from Skyways

General characteristics

- Crew: one
- Capacity: one passenger
- Powerplant: 1 × Kinner K-5 Radial engine
