= Davis D-1 =

Two seat American parasol-winged monoplane

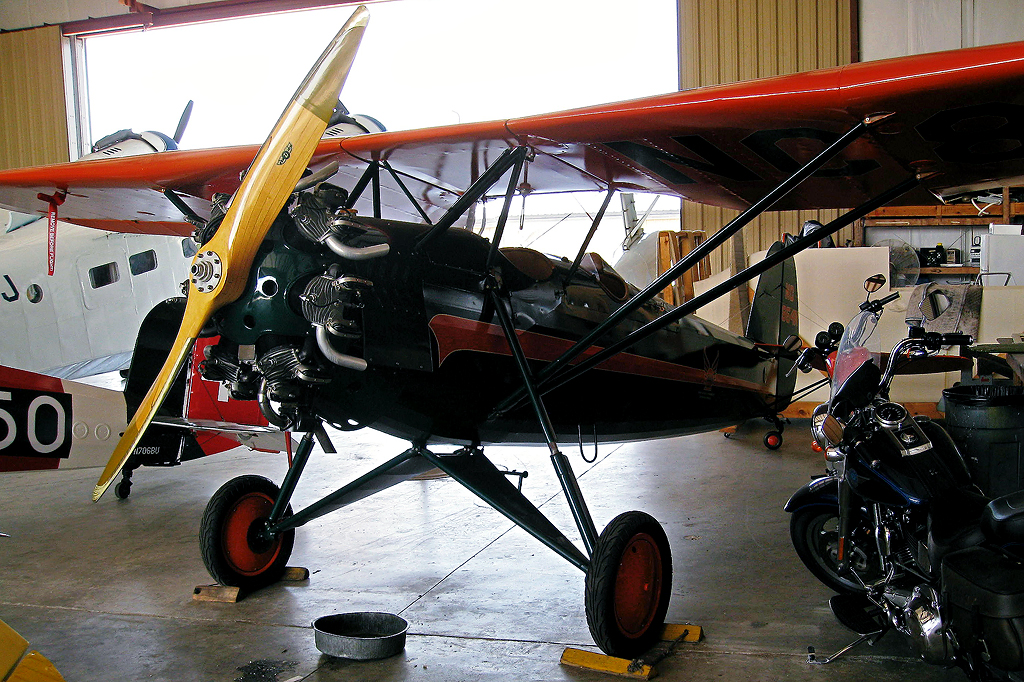
- Airworthy Davis D-1-W with 145 h.p. Warner Scarab at Bartow Municipal Airport, Florida, in April 2009

General information
- Type: light sports aircraft
- National origin: United States
- Manufacturer: Davis Aircraft Corporation
- Status: some still flying
- Primary user: private pilot owners

History
- Manufactured: 1929-1930
- Introduction date: 1929

The Davis D-1 is an American light two-seat parasol-winged monoplane of the late 1920s.

== Development and design ==
The Davis D-1 was developed from the Davis V-3, which in turn was developed from the Vulcan American Moth. The Davis Aircraft Corporation had its factory at Richmond, Indiana. The D-1 is a parasol-winged aircraft of mixed construction with a two-spar wing and a rectangular welded steel-tube fuselage, the whole being covered by fabric. There are tandem open cockpits and it is fitted with a fixed tailwheel undercarriage which is attached by struts to the fuselage top and bottom. The wing is braced by struts from the lower fuselage. Various engines of between 60 and 125 hp (45 and 93 kW) have been fitted.

== Operational history ==
The D-1 was used from 1929 by sporting pilots and by private pilot owners for leisure flying. In September 1930, Art Chester bought a Davis D-1-85 parasol, and flew it to victory in the 1930 National Air Races. A late model D-1W "The Whistler II" was built in 1933 for Davis with a canopy. It was raced in the 1934 Miami air race by Art Davis winning the category at 133.478 mph. It was later owned by movie star Richard Arlen, and restored to become a Grand Champion antique.

Most Davis aircraft were sold in the United States but at least one went to Argentina. Fourteen examples remained in 2001 in various states of airworthiness and several are still airworthy in 2011.

== Variants ==
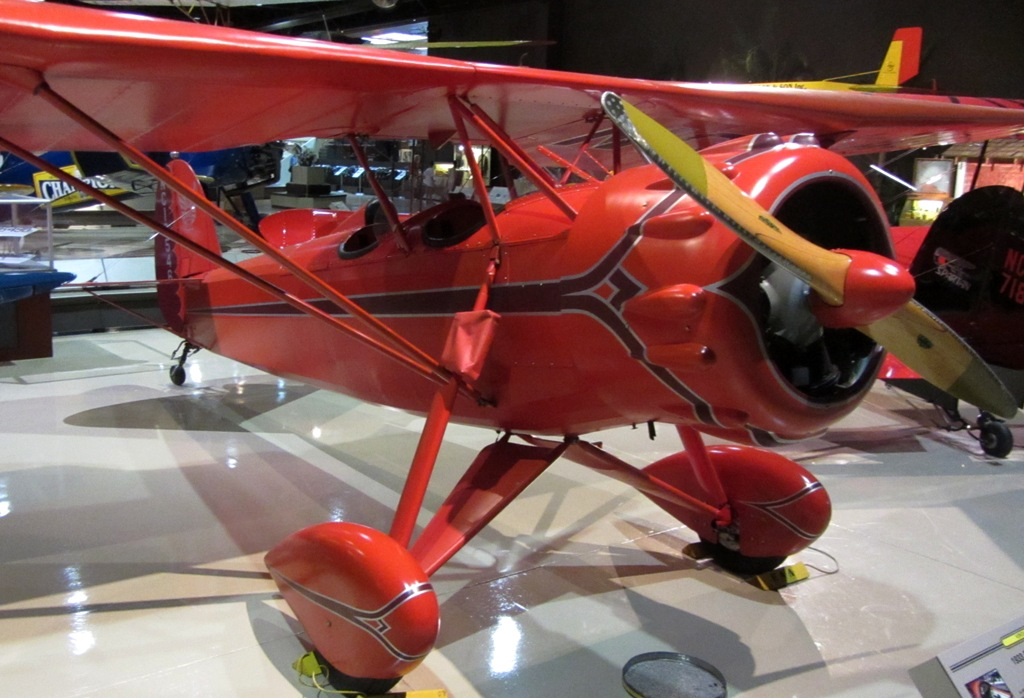
Davis D-1-W at the EAA Aviation Museum in Oshkosh, Wisconsin

(Data from Aerofiles)

D-1
60 hp (45 kW) LeBlond 5D (23 built)
D-1-166
85 hp (63 kW) LeBlond 5DF (4 built)
D-1-K
100 hp (75 kW) Kinner K-5 (10-15 built)
D-1-L
prototype of the D-1-166 with 90 hp (67 kW) Lambert R-266 (1 built - also known as D-1-85)
D-1-W
125 hp (93 kW) Warner Scarab (8 converted from D-1-K)

== Surviving aircraft ==
1929 Davis D-1 on exhibit at the Wayne County Historical Museum in Richmond, Indiana

Exhibited at the Wayne County Historical Museum in Richmond, Indiana is a restored Davis D-1 (pictured) built in 1929 and last flown in 1953. Identified by serial no. 103, registration no. 2685, it is powered by a LeBlond 5DF rated at 85 hp (63 kW) and fitted with a spinner. Fred Nottingham of Richmond purchased the aircraft in 1988 and donated it to the museum in 1990, where it is located on the main floor, suspended from the ceiling.

A Davis D-1-W (pictured above), serial no. 304, registration no. NC13456, is in the collection of the EAA Aviation Museum in Oshkosh, Wisconsin. Donated in 2006, it is powered by a Warner Super Scarab rated at 145 hp (108 kW) and fitted with an engine cowl and spinner. The main wheels are spatted.

== Specifications (D-1-W) ==
Data from Green

General characteristics

- Crew: one
- Capacity: one passenger
- Length: 20 ft 4 in (6.20 m)
- Wingspan: 30 ft 2 in (9.19 m)
- Height: 7 ft 3 in (2.21 m)
- Empty weight: 925 lb (420 kg)
- Gross weight: 1,461 lb (663 kg)
- Powerplant: 1 × Warner Scarab seven-cylinder radial air-cooled piston, 125 hp (93 kW)

Performance

- Maximum speed: 142 mph (229 km/h, 123 kn)
- Cruise speed: 122 mph (196 km/h, 106 kn)
- Stall speed: 46 mph (74 km/h, 40 kn)
- Range: 480 mi (770 km, 420 nmi)
- Service ceiling: 14,800 ft (4,500 m)
