= Doyle O-2 Oriole =

O-2 Oriole
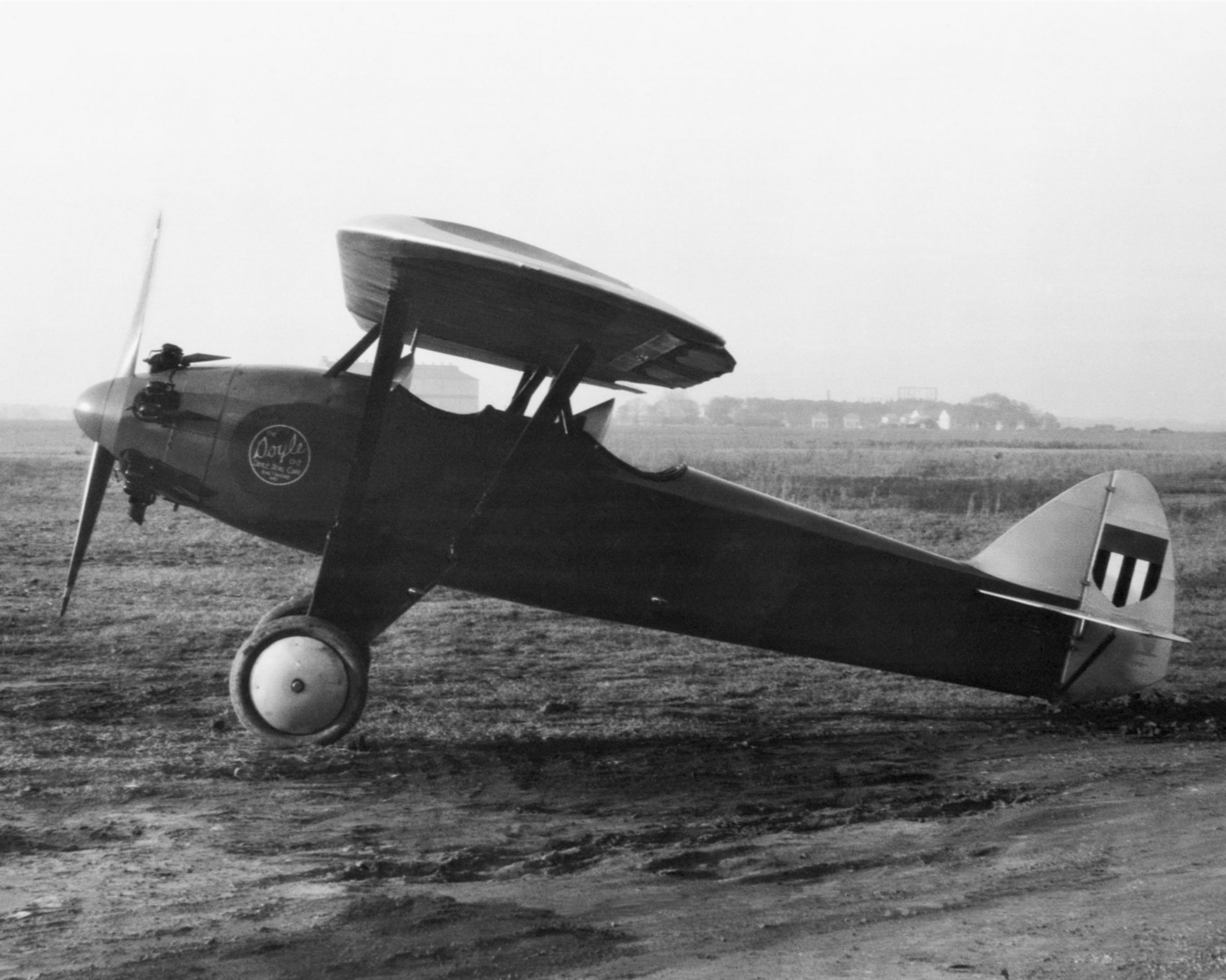

General information
- Type: Light aircraft
- National origin: United States
- Manufacturer: Doyle Aero Corporation
- Designer: Harvey Doyle, Raymond Crowley
- Number built: 7

History
- First flight: 15 October 1928

The Doyle Aero O-2 Oriole or Doyle O-2 was a parasol wing aircraft.

== Development ==
Brothers Harvey and Wilson Doyle designed the Vulcan American Moth Monoplane in 1928. They left the Vulcan Aircraft Company after a disagreement with its founder and moved to Baltimore Maryland with backing from Lawyer Charles Baldwin. They set to work on a new monoplane, with test pilot Otto Melamet flying the prototype O-2 Oriole on 15 October 1928.

== Design ==
The O-2 is a parasol wing, conventional landing gear, strut-braced, tandem-seat, open cockpit, sport aircraft. The fuselage is constructed of welded steel tubing with an aluminum turtledeck and belly covers, covered with fabric. The wing uses wooden spars and ribs with the fuel tanks the wing roots. A small door provided access to the front seat.

== Operational history ==
Serial number 2 and 3 were wrecked en route to the All-American airshow in Detroit to demonstrate the aircraft. Serial number 5 was rushed to completion to be trucked to the event. The same aircraft was restored in 1987 and still is airworthy with a private owner.

== Variants ==
O-3 Oriole
O-2 modified with a 120 hp (89 kW) Chevrolair D-4 engine

== Specifications (O-2 Oriole) ==
Data from Sport Aviation

General characteristics

- Crew: 1
- Capacity: 1
- Length: 19 ft (5.8 m)
- Wingspan: 30 ft (9.1 m)
- Empty weight: 780 lb (354 kg)
- Gross weight: 1,280 lb (581 kg)
- Fuel capacity: 12 U.S. gallons (45 L; 10.0 imp gal)
- Powerplant: 1 × LeBlond 5DE Radial, 65 hp (48 kW)
- Propellers: 2-bladed

Performance

- Maximum speed: 89 kn (102 mph, 164 km/h)
- Cruise speed: 74 kn (85 mph, 137 km/h)

== See also ==
Related development

- Vulcan American Moth Monoplane

Aircraft of comparable role, configuration, and era

- Heath Parasol - Parasol
