= Doyle Aero =

American aircraft manufacturer

Doyle Aero Corporation
- Industry: Aircraft Manufacturer
- Founded: 1928
- Headquarters: Baltimore, Maryland
- Key people: Harvey and Dr. Wilson K. Doyle
- Products: Doyle Aero O-2 Oriole

Doyle Aero Corporation was an American aircraft manufacturer.

The Doyle Aero corporation was founded after the Doyle brothers left the Vulcan Aircraft company where they designed the Vulcan American Moth Monoplane. Lawyer Charles Baldwin arranged to finance a new venture with Harvey Doyle as President and Wilson Doyle as General Manager. The Doyles set up on Elm street in a Baltimore, Maryland factory building a similar parasol monoplane design, the O-2 Oriole, later named the Doyle O-2 The prototype flew on 15 October 1928 with a yellow and black paint scheme and was priced at $2,975. Doyle Aero did not survive the Great Depression economy and ceased operations after a short production run. Harvey Doyle became an aeronautical engineer, and Wilson Doyle would become a professor of Political Science.

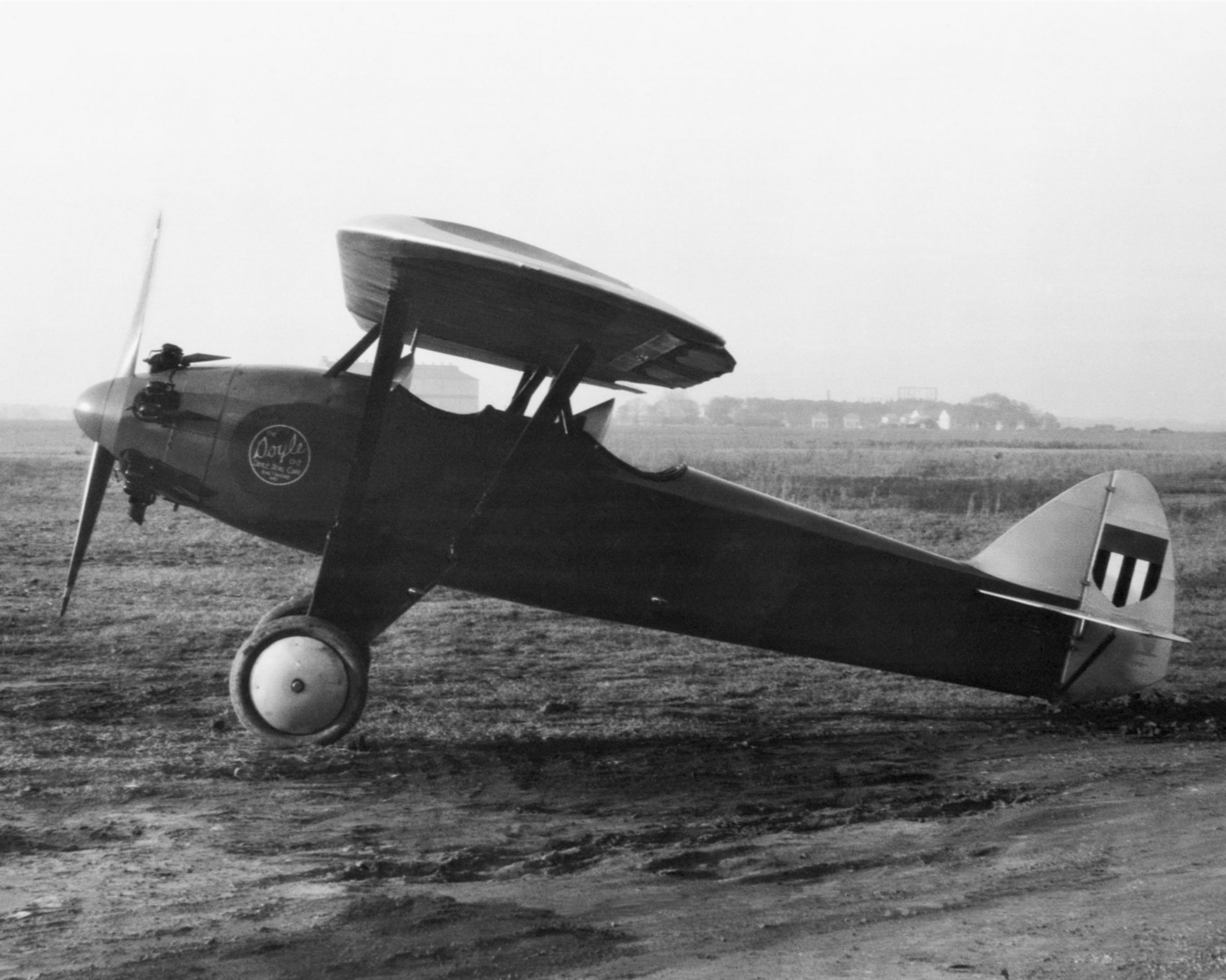
The Doyle O-2 Oriole

The last surviving O-2 serial number A-5 (NX9531) was restored in 1984 after being in storage since 1934 and identified by its designer Harvey Doyle. It is currently privately owned.

== Aircraft ==
| Model name | First flight | Number built | Type |
|---|---|---|---|
| O-2 Oriole | 1928 | 7 | Parasol |
| O-3 Oriole | 1928 | 1 | Parasol |
