= Edward G. Budd =

American inventor and businessman (1870-1946)

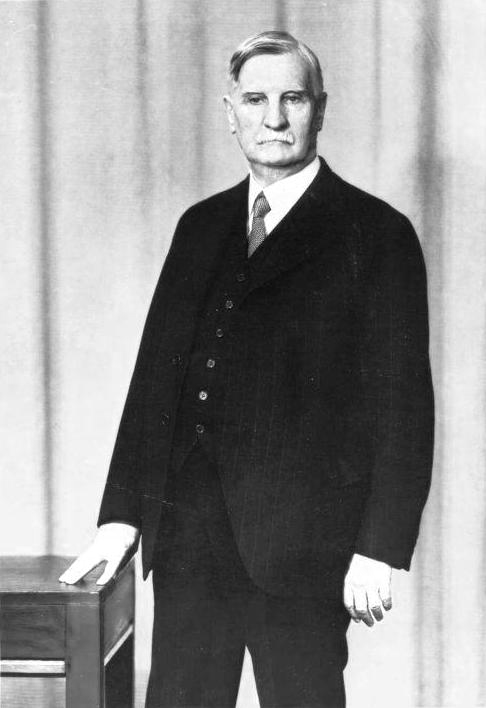
- Edward G. Budd,1925
- Born: Edward Gowen Budd; December 28, 1870; Smyrna, Delaware, U.S.
- Died: November 30, 1946 (aged 75); Philadelphia, Pennsylvania, U.S.
- Resting place: West Laurel Hill Cemetery, Bala Cynwyd, Pennsylvania, U.S.
- Occupation: Steel product manufacturer
- Employer(s): Hale & Kilburn; Edward G. Budd Manufacturing Company
- Spouse: Mary Wright (m. 1899)
- Children: 5

Edward Gowen Budd (December 28, 1870 – November 30, 1946) was an American inventor and businessman. As an employee of Hale & Kilburn, he innovated the usage of stamped steel in the production of railroad cars for the Pullman Company and the Hupmobile, the first steel bodied automobile in the world. In 1912, he founded the Edward G. Budd Manufacturing Company, and implemented the usage of stamped steel in the production of automobiles. In 1917, he founded the Budd Wheel Company to produce steel wire automobile wheels. He pioneered the fabrication of stainless steel and the shotweld process in the construction of the Pioneer Zephyr railroad cars. His factories converted to the production of steel based wartime materials during both World War I and World War II.

In 1944, he received the American Society of Mechanical Engineers award for outstanding engineering achievements. He was posthumously admitted to the Automotive Hall of Fame and National Railroad Hall of Fame.

== Early life and education ==
Edward Gowen Budd was born in Smyrna, Delaware, on December 28, 1870. He showed interest at an early age in the mechanical trades. While working, he took courses at night in drafting and mechanical engineering at the Franklin Institute and the University of Pennsylvania.

== Career ==
=== Early career ===
After graduating from public high school aged 17, Budd went to work as a machinist apprentice at Taylor Iron Works. In 1890, he moved to Philadelphia and worked as a machinist apprentice at Sellers Machines and Foundry Company. He left Sellers to accept a junior position with the Bement-Pond Tool Company. He moved up the ranks at Bement-Pond and became the department head for hydraulic press design.

In 1898, he left Bement-Pond to worked at the American Pulley Company as chief draftsman. In 1898, he obtained a patent for a stamped steel pulley which was lighter and less expensive to produce. He patented his own design for a stamped steel pulley in 1900.

In 1902, he joined Hale & Kilburn to bring his expertise in stamped steel construction to design railroad car furniture. He and fellow employee Morris Lachman implemented arc welding into the production process which allowed stamped steel to be put together in ways that were not previously possible. The lighter and more durable furniture became very successful. In 1904, he became the production manager of the plant and a member of the board of directors. In 1906, Hale & Kilburn partnered with the Pullman Company to design steel railroad cars that were only slightly heavier than wood cars, but less flammable and safer in a crash.

Budd also worked on a partnership between Hale & Kilburn and the Hupp Motor Company to implement stamped and welded steel in the production of the Hupmobile, the first steel bodied car in the world. In 1911, Hale & Kilburn was purchased by J.P. Morgan who replaced much of the management with people that had less experience in metal manufacturing. Budd's ability to experiment and take on innovative but risky projects was limited by the new management. The stress of the new management affected his mental health. He took a two month leave of absence and resigned upon his return in 1912.

=== Budd Company ===
On July 22, 1912, he founded the Edward G. Budd Manufacturing Company, with $75,000 of his own money and $25,000 in investments. He recruited talent from Hale & Kilburn and brought Joseph Ledwinka over to his new company. They began making bodies for metal trucks for a local coal company but soon expanded to making steel automobile bodies for Garford Motors and Oakland Motor Car Company, a division of General Motors.

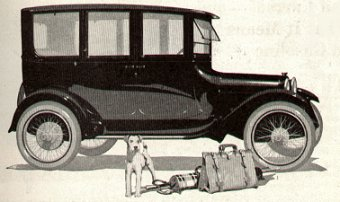
First all-steel sedan by Edward G Budd Manufacturing Company of Philadelphia for John and Horace Dodge

The business started to become successful and he was able to expand production with the purchase of the Grabowski Wagon Factory in Detroit to allow for production of steel parts closer to the final assembly location. He expanded his business with additional customers including Studebaker and Dodge. In 1914, Dodge placed an order for 5,000 steel automobile bodies and increased that order to 50,000 in 1915.

He was known to conduct promotional stunts of rolling the cars down hills and having an elephant stand atop the vehicles to show the strength of steel bodied automobiles. He offered competitors of wood bodied cars the opportunity to replicate the challenges, but none took him up on it.

In 1917, he founded the Budd Wheel Company to produce steel automobile wheels. During World War I, production of automobile bodies ceased and efforts were directed toward production of war effort materials including artillery carriage wheels, helmets, ordnance, and shell casings.

Budd built the first all-steel sedan for Dodge in 1923. The Dodge brothers had not believed such a thing possible but they were persuaded to allow Budd to go ahead with the design, die-making and press-installation needed for actual production to begin. Other US manufacturers soon followed Dodge's lead. Closed bodies outsold open bodies from 1923 on.

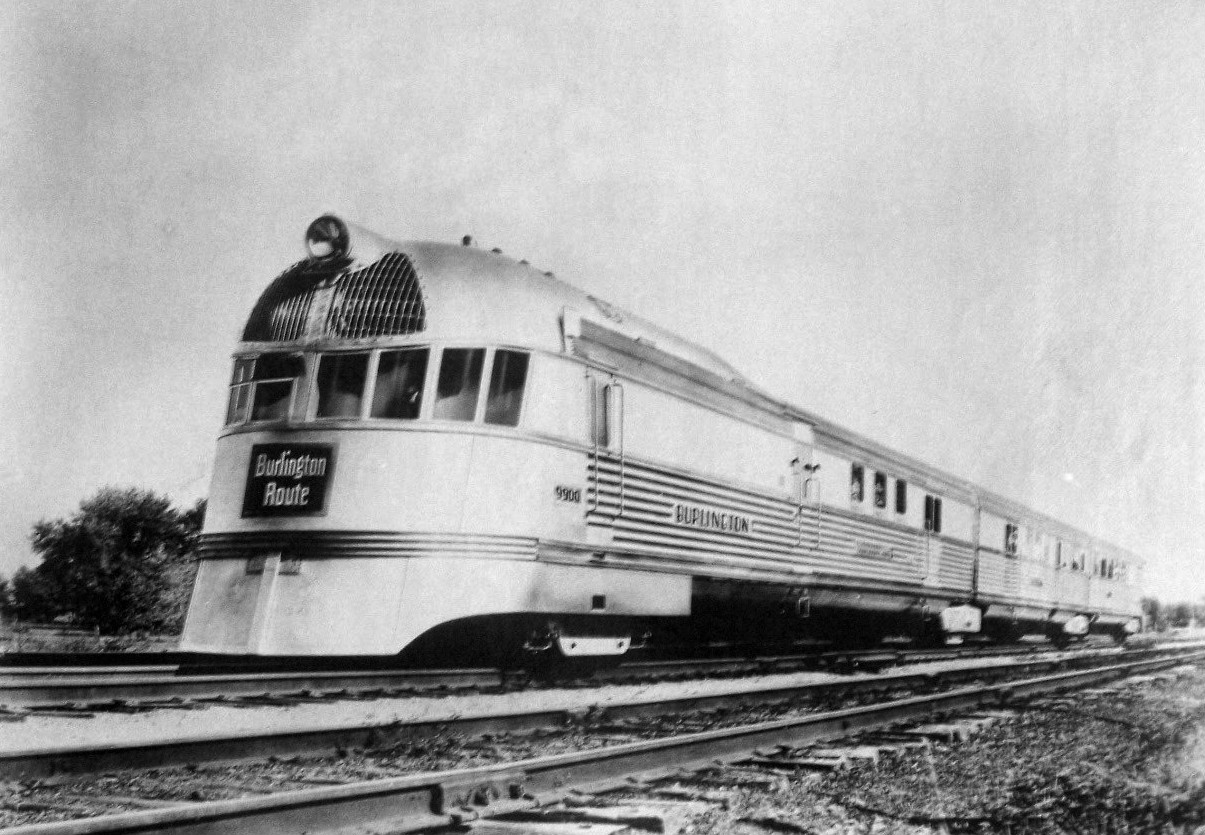
Pioneer Zephyr

During the Great Depression in the 1930s, Budd pioneered the fabrication of stainless steel. The company partnered with American Aeronautical Corporation and implemented stainless steel in the construction of the Savoie Marchetti seaplane. He implemented stainless steel into the production of railroad cars and developed the shotweld process which allowed for thinner sheets of stainless steel to be combined without weakening the properties of the metal. He helped create the Pioneer Zephyr, a streamlined train for the Chicago, Burlington and Quincy Railroad. Budd stainless steel railway cars were very successful for many years.

During World War II, Budd returned to manufacturing military equipment in his factories. He was the main maker of the bazooka rockets and the rifle grenade. His factories made artillery shells, aircraft components and a myriad of other military items. He partnered with the United States Navy to build the Budd RB Conestoga aircraft for military transport. He and his company were also instrumental in the development of the radial disk brake and the automatic wheel line.

In 1933 and 1934, to prevent the American Federation of Labor from unionizing the Philadelphia operations, Budd fired over 1,000 workers who went on strike. He refused to re-hire the workers even after being ordered to by the National Labor Board.

In 1944, he received the American Society of Mechanical Engineers award for outstanding engineering achievements.

== Personal life ==
Budd married Mary Wright in May 1899. He had two sons, Edward G. Budd Jr. and Archibald W. Budd, and three daughters.

Budd died on November 30, 1946, at his home in the Germantown neighborhood of Philadelphia. He was interred at West Laurel Hill Cemetery in Bala Cynwyd, Pennsylvania.

== Legacy ==
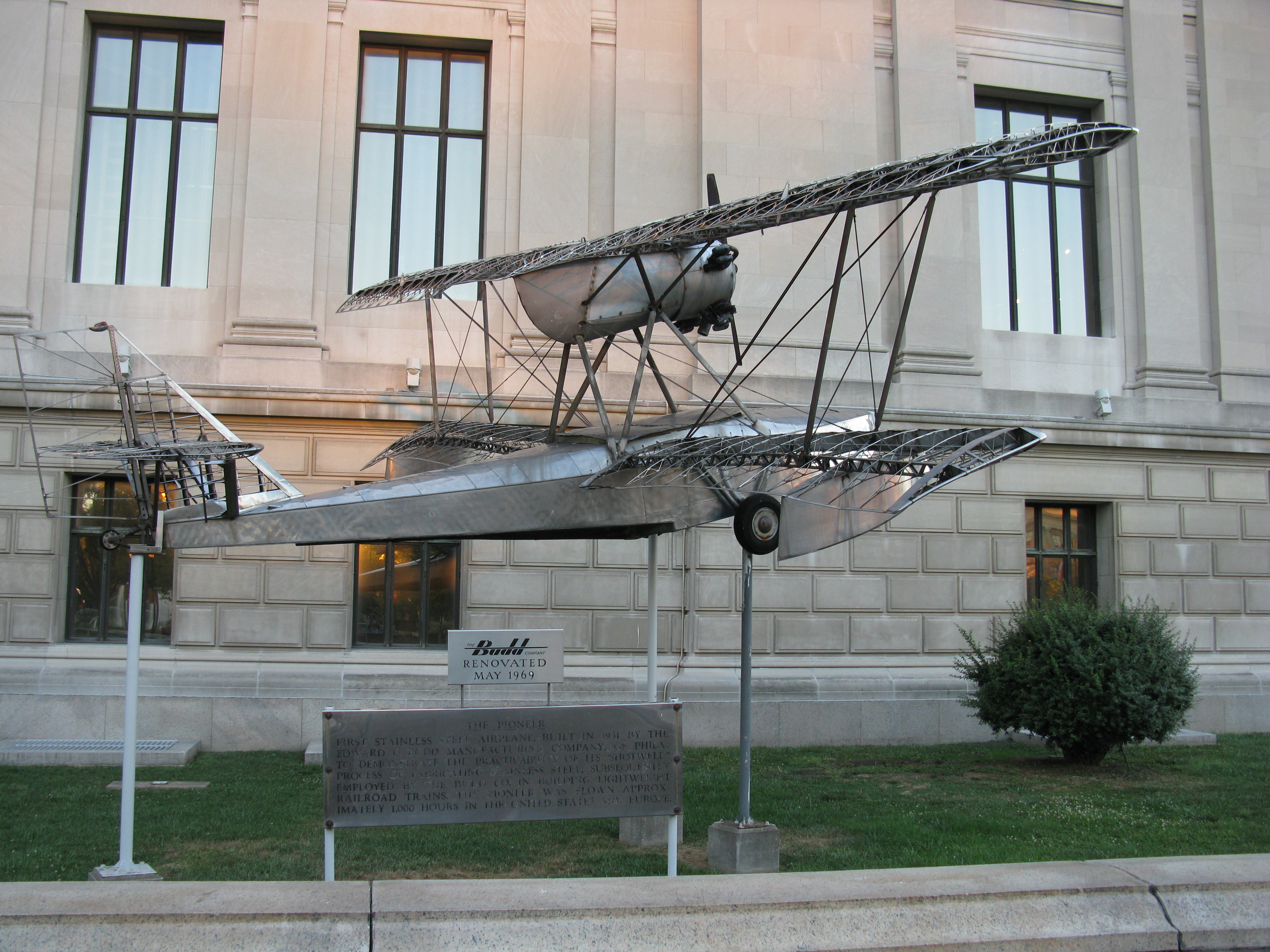
The Budd BB-1 Pioneer on display outside the Franklin Institute in Philadelphia

Budd's Pioneer Zephyr train is on permanent display at the Museum of Science and Industry in Chicago. His stainless steel prototype airplane, the Budd BB-1 Pioneer, is on display outside the Franklin Institute in Philadelphia.

Budd was inducted into the Automotive Hall of Fame in 1985, and the National Railroad Hall of Fame in 2015.
