= Higgins EB-1 =

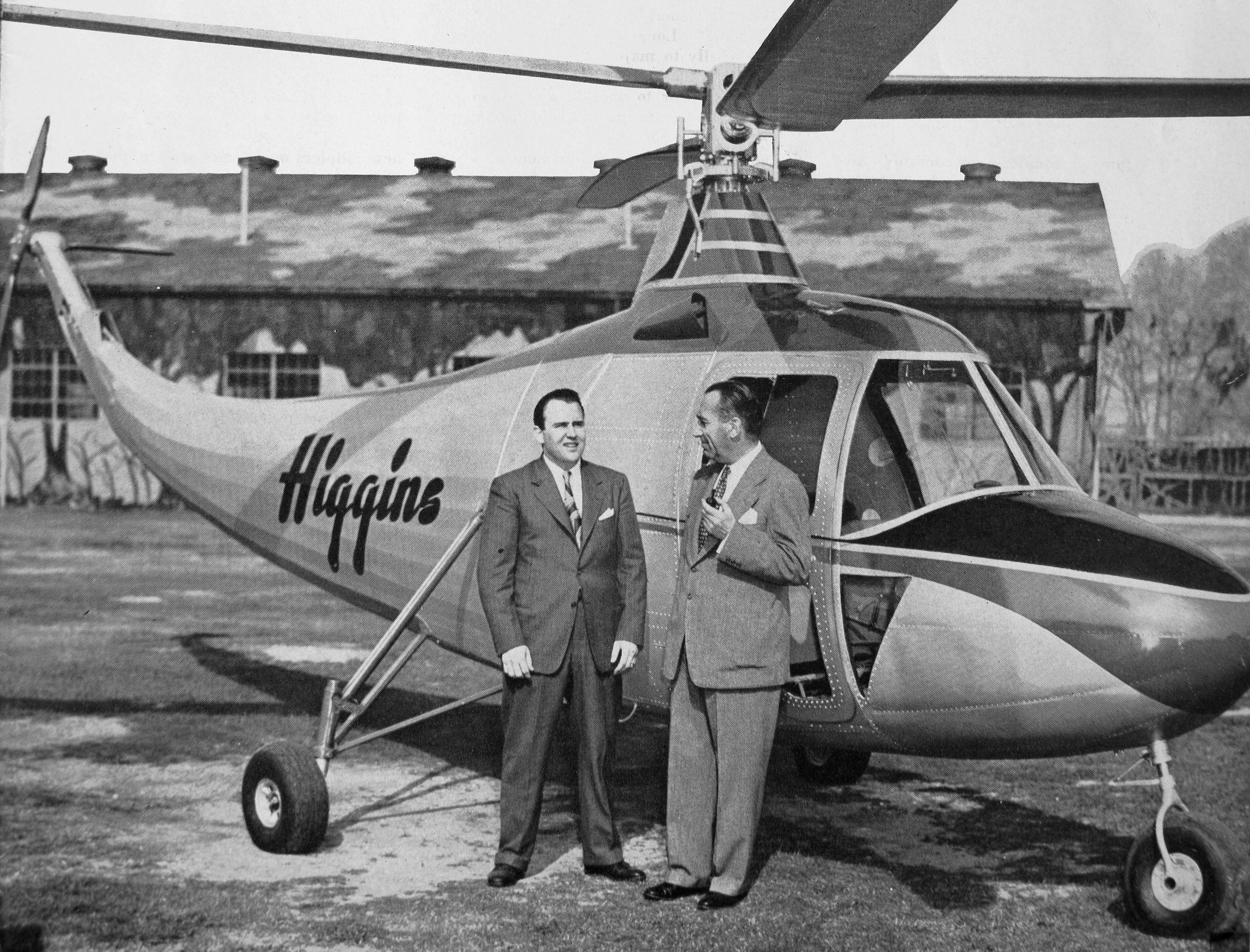

General information
- Type: Helicopter
- National origin: United States
- Manufacturer: Higgins Industries
- Designer: Enea Bossi
- Number built: 1

History
- First flight: 1943

The Higgins EB-1 is an American helicopter built by Higgins Industries of New Orleans, Louisiana. The EB-1 was originally developed by the Delgado Trade School and completed by Enea Bossi.

== Design and development ==
The EB-1 was a two-seat helicopter with a single four-bladed main rotor and two-bladed anti-torque tail rotor. It had a fixed tricycle landing gear and was powered by a 180 hp (134 kW) Warner pressure cooled piston engine. Bossi and the company had ambitious plans for a family of helicopters but in the end only one was built.

== Specifications ==
General characteristics

- Crew: 2
- Empty weight: 1,951 lb (885 kg)
- Gross weight: 2,546 lb (1,155 kg)
- Powerplant: 1 × Warner piston engine, 180 hp (130 kW)
- Main rotor diameter: 32 ft 0 in (9.75 m)

Performance

- Cruise speed: 120 mph (200 km/h, 110 kn)
