= Bossi-Bonomi Pedaliante =

Pedaliante
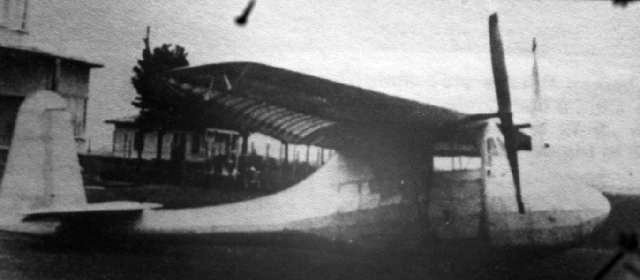

General information
- Type: Human-powered aircraft
- National origin: Italy
- Designer: Enea Bossi
- Number built: 1

History
- First flight: 1936

The Pedaliante (Italian for "Pedal Glider") was a human-powered aircraft designed and built by Enea Bossi and Vittorio Bonomi and credited with, in 1936, making one of the first fully human-powered flights. The aircraft successfully traveled 1 km (0.62 mi) as part of an Italian competition, but was denied the monetary prize due to its catapult launch.

== History ==
=== Early development ===
In 1932, Enea Bossi heard of an airplane which had successfully flown while powered only by a 0.75 kW (1.01 hp) engine. This prompted Bossi to calculate the minimum power that a crewed aircraft would need to fly. The calculation yielded a value of approximately 0.70 kW (0.94 hp), which convinced Bossi that human-powered flight might be possible.

During a trip to Philadelphia, Bossi tested the speed at which a glider would take off under tow. The experiment consisted of hiring a professional bicyclist to tow a glider. A spring scale was attached to the tow line to sense the force exerted by the bicyclist, the results confirming that a speed at which the necessary lift could be obtained was indeed attainable. This same experimental procedure was later repeated as part of the development of the Gossamer Condor and the Gossamer Albatross.

A second experiment conducted during a trip to Paris involved a propeller-driven bicycle designed by Bossi; the test rider achieved a speed of 37 km/h (23 mph), but one drawback was noted: the gyroscopic effect of the propeller generated so much torque that the bicycle became unstable. Bossi concluded, erroneously, that a successful human-powered aircraft would therefore require two counter-rotating propellers to cancel out the effects of torque.

In 1933, the Frankfurt Polytechnische Gesellschaft (Frankfurt Polytechnic Society) offered a prize to promote human-powered flight. Due to the newly-formed Rome-Berlin axis, similar political and military events were staged during the initial period in both Italy and Germany to help strengthen that bond. To this end, in 1936, the Italian government initiated an equivalent contest: offering 100,000 lire for a 1 km (0.62 mi) human-powered flight made by an Italian citizen. Bossi was aware that he could not receive the prize due to his American citizenship, but he opted to attempt to win it, anyway.

=== Aircraft design ===
Bossi's human-powered aircraft, named the Pedaliante, utilized conventional glider configuration and construction. The high-winged streamlined monoplane design featured two laminated balsa wood propellers – each approximately 2 m (6 ft 7 in) in diameter. The control surfaces consisted of a conventional rear rudder, elevator, and a pair of roll spoilers on the wings – all activated by a divided control yoke. The pilot sat semi-upright, and a bicycle chain transmitted the power from the pedals to an overhead transverse shaft that was bevel-geared to the two propellers, which extended from the wing on each side of the fuselage.

Vittorio Bonomi, an Italian sailplane manufacturer, was contracted to build the aircraft. The wooden airframe was originally specified to have an empty weight of 73 kg (160.9 lb), with an overweight contingency of 9.1 kg (20.06 lb). While this design would have been feasible, the Ministry of Aeronautics (Ministero dell' Aeronautica) required that the aircraft satisfy the same structural requirements of an engine-powered aircraft, forcing the designer to increase empty weight to nearly 100 kg (220.46 lb).

=== Flights ===
Bossi and Bonomi enlisted Emilio Casco, a major in the Italian Army and a very strong bicyclist, to pilot the Pedaliante. After several weeks of trials in early 1936, Casco took off in the Pedaliante and flew 91.4 m (300 ft) completely under his own power. Although subsequent calculations have verified that this flight was physically possible, most agree that it was Casco's considerable physical strength and endurance which made the accomplishment feasible; it was not a feat which could be attained by a typical person.

To improve performance it was decided that additional thrust was necessary; in response, the propellers were increased in diameter to 2.25 m (7 ft 5 in), increasing available thrust. Despite the additional thrust, the team still found the aircraft to be too heavy to travel the 1 km (0.62 mi) the contest demanded. However, the German HV-1 Mufli (Muskelkraft-Flugzeug), a human-powered aircraft built by Helmut Hässler & Franz Villinger, traveled 235 m (771 ft) on its debut flight in 1935 and attained a distance of 712 m (2,336 ft) in 1937 utilizing a tensioned cable launching system.

Incorporating a catapult launch to a height of 9 m (30 ft), the Pedaliante made a flight on 13 September 1936 which traveled several hundred meters. On 18 March 1937, at Cinisello airport near Milan, the aircraft was launched at a height of 9 m (30 ft) and Casco successfully pedaled the craft for its full 1 km (0.62 mi). This set a world record for human-powered flight, but as a catapult launch was not permitted in the rules of the competition, the Pedaliante did not win the prize for which it was designed. The aircraft was retired the following year having made a total 80 flights – 43 without the assistance of a catapult launch. At the time, the Mufli and the Pedaliante were the most advanced human-powered aircraft ever built.

== Specifications ==
Data from

General characteristics

- Crew: 1
- Wingspan: 17.7 m (58 ft 1 in)
- Wing area: 23.4 m^{2} (252 sq ft)
- Aspect ratio: 13.4
- Airfoil: NACA 0012-F1
- Empty weight: 97 kg (214 lb)
- Propellers: 2-bladed 2 × laminated balsa wood fixed pitch propellers, 2.25 m (7 ft 5 in) diameter A bicycle chain transmitted the power from the pedals to an overhead transverse shaft which was bevel-geared to the two propellers, extending from the wing on each side of the fuselage.

Performance
