= Knoll Aircraft Company =

- Company type: Aircraft Manufacturer
- Founded: October 10, 1928
- Defunct: October 28, 1929
- Fate: Assets purchased
- Successor: Yellow Air Cab Company
- Headquarters: Wichita, Kansas
- Key people: Felix W. A. Knoll, T.M. "Tommy" Thomas, George Bruce, C.V. Snyder, D.E. Sauder, Harold Zipp

Knoll Aircraft Company was an American aircraft manufacturer based in Wichita, Kansas.

== Design and development ==
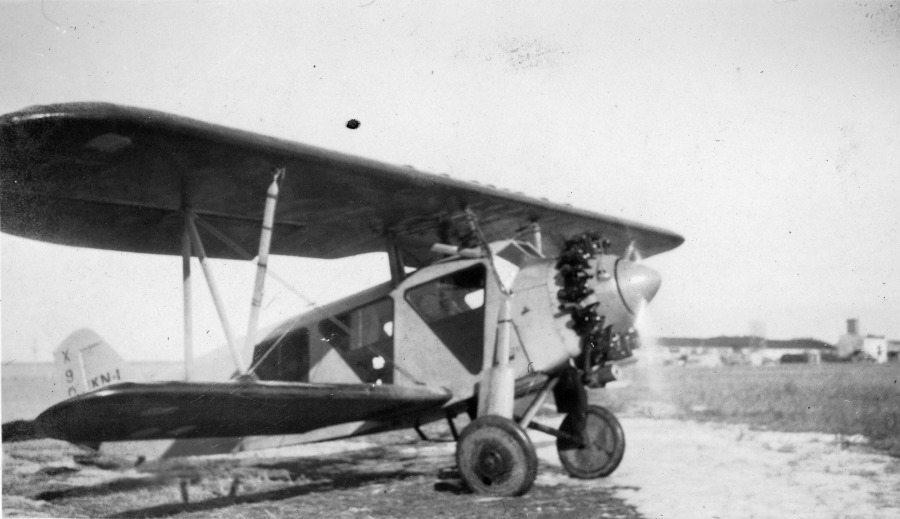
Knoll KN-1 – NX9090

The Knoll Aircraft Corporation received its state charter on October 10, 1928. Felix Knoll, formerly of The Rohrbach Metal Aeroplane Company (Germany) and later the Chief Engineer of the Heinkel Aircraft Company, immigrated to the United States from Germany for better opportunities. Within weeks of being in the country, Wichita business leaders recruited Felix to come to Wichita and start a company of his own. Engineering work, stress calculations, and drawings for the first model, the KN-1, were completed in Room 623 of the Broadview Hotel. Felix and Herbert Schwenke; another German immigrant from The Rohrbach Metal Aeroplane Company, worked on the plans together.

George Siedhoff, who owned and built the Broadview Hotel where the KN-1 was designed, was selected to build a new 50,000 square foot factory on a 148-acre tract of land at the northeast corner of Kellogg and Webb Road. The building featured two stories, a mezzanine area, clear story windows, and adjacent runway. Assets such as machinery, tools, and equipment were purchased from the bankruptcy of Laird Whippoorwill Airplane Company. The company set up a temporary shop at 471 W 1st street in the former building of both the Travel Air Company and Laird Whippoorwill. By the end of December, 1928, the first airplane was ready to fly.

Over five hundred spectators gathered around the East Airport to watch the KN-1 first flight. Amongst the crowd were Lloyd Stearman, Walter Beech, reporters, and motion picture cameramen. The December 30, 1928 first test flight was so successful that pilot Howard Jones chose to double the planned time and stayed in the air for thirty minutes. He took the airplane through loops, rolls, and power dives.

The KN-2 and KN-3 models shared the common airframe of the KN-1, though they were upgraded with more powerful 300 and 425 horsepower engines. The KN-3 also had an open-place cockpit in back of the cabin, allowing the seating of one additional passenger inside. Art Goebel, a pilot famous for winning the 1928 Dole Air Race from San Diego to Hawaii, was to have a larger custom built KN-4 to race around the world.

== Operational history ==
On June 12, 1929, test-pilot Russell Dick flying the Knoll KN-3, beat the US Army's Lieutenant Walker piloting a Thomas-Morse pursuit plane in a race performing at the Wichita Air Show. On June 21 he performed again at the Aerial Wedding of Kansas, Oklahoma, Missouri, and Texas. He did steep power dives from 3000 feet to 100 feet, thrilling the crowds and demonstrating the strength of the airframe.

The first and fourth aircraft produced were purchased by Mexican interests at a time of civil war. The delivery of the aircraft were later held up by political and registration issues en route. On June 2, 1929, the new factory building under construction at Kellogg and Webb road was severely damaged by a storm. On June 16, 1929, 6,000 new shares of capital stock were released.

== Closing ==
In July 1929 the company was not paying its bills. The company assets were found to be embezzled soon afterward. Demand for new aircraft in the summer of 1929 was softening. Arguments between the board of directors and management broke out over the necessity of building the new factory, the hiring of too many engineers, and also the Yunker contract work. Payment for the Yunker work was to have been stock in the Yunker Aircraft Company. The lack of funds, and sales combined with the depression, halted production with three new aircraft in development. The company was placed into receivership on August 26, 1929, under the management of Ray Theis. The company began moving into the new factory on August 27, 1929.

On October 28, 1929 the company was shut down and on December 18, the assets were liquidated at auction. Roy Buckley purchased the manufacturing machinery and equipment. He would later found the Buckley Aircraft Company. George Siedhoff purchased uncompleted airframe sections and parts, as well as the rights to X8899. C.V. Snyder bought the new plant and grounds. The Yellow Air Cab Company, in turn, bought it in late 1930. The airport property was then purchased by Beechcraft in 1940 and became their Plant II.

== Aircraft ==
Model name	First flight	Number built	Type	Engine	Horsepower	Registration
Knoll KN-1	1928	3	Cabin biplane	Wright J-5	220	X9090, X8861, *
Knoll KN-2	1929	1	Cabin biplane	Wright J-6	300	X8899
Knoll KN-3	1929	1	Cabin biplane with open cockpit aft	Pratt and Whitney R-1340	425	X9950
Knoll KN-4		0	Cabin biplane (planned derivative)			
Knoll KN-5		0	Sport biplane (in development)			
Knoll KN-6		0	Amphibian (in development)			
Knoll KN-22		0	Multiengine seaplane (in development)	Packard 3A-2500 V12 (8 qty)	800 each	

- One airplane was destroyed by fire on February 1, 1929, while sitting idle; when a Laird aircraft landed on top of it.

== Technical staff ==
Name	Title	Country	Other Employment
Felix Knoll	Vice-President and Chief Engineer	Germany	Chief Designer of Heinkel Aircraft, Rohrbach Metal Aeroplane Company
Herbert Schwenke	Engineer	Germany	Chief of Airplane Design, Rohrbach Metal Aeroplane Company
Alfred Longardt	Engineer	Germany	First Assistant of Airplane Design, Heinkel Aircraft
Dr. Friederich Dawid	Engineer	Germany	Professor at German Aeronautical Technical University
Karl Ziller	Engineer	Germany	Chief Engineer at Dornier Flugzeugwerke
Ernst Froelich	Engineer	Germany	Departmental Chief of Engineering, Rohrbach Metal Aeroplane Company
Egon Winter	Engineer	Germany	Statics Department Head, Dornier Flugzeugwerke
Gerhardt Schmidt	Engineer	Netherlands	Wing Department Head, Fokker Company
Harold Zipp	Engineer	USA	Went on to co-design the Model 70 Stearman biplane.
Dick Bollby	Welding Department Head	USA	
Russell Dick	Test-pilot	USA	Went on to become Braniff, then TWA Captain
Howard Jones	Chief Test-pilot	USA	Went on to Dept of Commerce/died Fleet monoplane crash Buffalo NY
Charles Quick	Factory Superintendent	USA	Quick Air Motors founder and inventor
Emil Zeck	Sheetmetal Construction Specialist	Switzerland	

== Specifications (KN-1) ==
General characteristics

- Crew: One pilot
- Capacity: 3 passengers
- Length: 23 ft 3 in (7.09 m)
- Wingspan: 33 ft 6 in (10.21 m)
- Wing area: 264 sq ft (24.5 m^{2})
- Airfoil: Goettingen 620
- Empty weight: 1,800 lb (816 kg)
- Gross weight: 3,050 lb (1,383 kg)
- Powerplant: 1 × Wright J-5-9 , 220 hp (164 kW)

Performance

- Maximum speed: 140 mph (225 km/h, 120 kn)
- Range: 1,200 mi (1,931 km, 1,000 nmi)
- Service ceiling: 14,000 ft (4,267 m)
- Rate of climb: 800 ft/min (4.1 m/s)

== Specifications (KN-3) ==
General characteristics

- Crew: One pilot
- Capacity: 4 passengers
- Length: 24 ft 3 in (7.39 m)
- Wingspan: 33 ft 6 in (10.21 m)
- Wing area: 264 sq ft (24.5 m^{2})
- Airfoil: Goettingen 620
- Empty weight: 2,100 lb (953 kg)
- Gross weight: 4,000 lb (1,814 kg)
- Powerplant: 1 × R-1340-9 , 425 hp (317 kW)

Performance

- Maximum speed: 175 mph (282 km/h, 152 kn)
- Range: 800 mi (1,287 km, 700 nmi)
- Service ceiling: 18,000 ft (5,486 m)
- Rate of climb: 1,200 ft/min (6.1 m/s)

== Specifications (KN-22 Twin-Hull Amphibian) ==
General characteristics

- Crew: 10
- Capacity: 22–40 passengers
- Length: 91 ft 10 in (28.0 m)
- Wingspan: 160 ft 0 in (48.76 m)
- Wing area: 3,000 sq ft (278.7 m^{2})
- Empty weight: 53,500 lb (24,267 kg)
- Gross weight: 72,600 lb (32,931 kg)
- Powerplant: 8 × Packard 3A-2500 V12 , 800 hp (596.6 kW) each

Performance

- Maximum speed: 226 mph (363.7 km/h, 196 kn)
