= Yellow Air Cab Company =

- Company type: Air taxi, Manufacturer
- Predecessor: Knoll Aircraft Company
- Founded: 27 May 1929
- Defunct: 1930
- Headquarters: Wichita, Kansas
- Key people: Gary E. Prebensen
- Subsidiaries: Yellow Aircab Manufacturing Company

Yellow Air Cab Company was a short lived American aircraft manufacturer based in Kansas.

The Yellow Air Cab Company was chartered on 27 May 1929. It was based in a hangar built from 1928-1929; previously occupied by the Knoll Aircraft Company in Wichita, Kansas. Stock was issued in August 1929. The company entered into an agreement that October to purchase 200 all-metal Buckley LC-4s designed with William Bushnell Stout at the same airport in an attempt to build aircraft for an air-taxi service and franchise through the Midwest. The company also bought the rights to the Hilton Super Mid-Wing in January 1930. The prototype crashed in February 1930 when a stabilizer broke off in flight, killing company pilot Shannon. Another stock sale followed shortly after the crash. In all cases, the company did not put these aircraft into profitable revenue service. The company remained optimistic, and purchased the remainder of the Knoll Aircraft company, the facilities, and the airport it resided on for $166,000 and issued more stock in June 1930. The location became the home of Straughn Aircraft Company until 1934, and Beechcraft plant number two in 1940, where the Beechcraft Staggerwings, and later Beechcraft Bonanza production took place.

== Aircraft ==
| Model name | First flight | Number built | Type |
|---|---|---|---|
| Hilton Super Mid-Wing | 1930 | 0 | Single engine commercial monoplane |
