= Shot welding =

Type of electric resistance welding

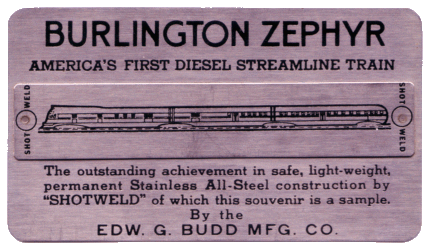
Stainless steel "business card" with a metal strip showing the Pioneer Zephyr train attached by two shot welds, undetectable on the reverse side

Shot welding is a type of electric resistance welding which, like spot welding, is used to join two pieces of metal together. The distinguishing feature is that in shot welding, strips and sheets of metal (usually stainless steel) are "sewed" together with rows of uniform spot welds. The weld is achieved by clamping the two pieces together then passing a large electric current through them for a short period of time. Shot welding was patented by Earl J. Ragsdale, a mechanical engineer at the Edward G. Budd Manufacturing Company in 1932 to weld stainless steel. This welding method was used to construct the first stainless steel train, Pioneer Zephyr, in 1934, and became the standard construction technology for railroad passenger cars thereafter.

== Method ==
In the early 20th century, the Edward G. Budd Manufacturing Company had been innovative in the field of sheet metal fabrication, and had revolutionized the construction of automotive bodies in steel during the 1920s. Edward Budd and his employees, notably Earl Ragsdale, recognized the important metallurgical characteristics of 18/8 stainless steel (known today as SAE 304 austenitic stainless steel) and further developed a spot welding process to take advantage of the oxidized layer on the surface of stainless steel. Heat treating the 18-8 stainless steel leaves the metal with non-magnetic and ductile properties. Repeatedly reheating the metal to 1000–1100°C impairs the mechanical and chemical properties of the metal. The metal becomes susceptible to corrosion due to carbide precipitation, and loses fatigue resistance. The important factor in controlling the metal's properties is the dwell time at those temperatures. Using a controlled time element and recorder, a power supply with smooth current, and very brief high currents, a satisfactory spot weld may be produced.

The corona of the shot weld should not exist on the metal, and the equipment used produces satisfactory welds with a smaller than normal diameter. Sufficient electrode force is applied to hold the two sheets of metal together and the peak current rapidly creates a forge weld at the interface between the two sheets, producing a small nugget of weld metal, which when cooled results in a shear-resistant metal interface. Good shotwelds have twice the shear strength of a rivet of similar diameter and can be placed 50% closer together. When done properly, distortion, which is a problem in fusion welding processes, is eliminated.
