= Buckley Aircraft =

American aircraft manufacturer

Buckley Aircraft Company
- Company type: Aircraft manufacturer
- Defunct: 1931
- Fate: Bankrupt in 1931
- Headquarters: Wichita, Kansas
- Key people: William Bushnell Stout
- Products: Light aircraft

Buckley Aircraft Company was an American aircraft manufacturer based in Wichita, Kansas.

Buckley aircraft was founded with US$150,000 in capital in 1929 by Fred Buckley, William J. Carr, Earl Jones, A.J Christman, Joseph Paul, and William Bushnell Stout.

The companies first product, the Buckley F-1 low winged monoplane with a Kinner K-5 engine was not considered a good design and was abandoned. The second product, the LC-4 was a modern all-aluminum four place aircraft that received orders for 200 units for air taxi service. The venture failed due to lack of capital as the Great Depression set in.

== Aircraft ==
Model name	First flight	Number built	Type
Buckley F-1	1929	1	Low wing monoplane
Buckley LC-4	1930	1	Low wing monoplane
