= Yunker Aircraft Company =

Coordinates: 37.684609°N 97.349873°W

- Company type: Aircraft manufacturer
- Founded: 1929
- Defunct: 1930
- Headquarters: 115 North Osage Wichita, Kansas
- Key people: George C. Yunker

Yunker Aircraft Company was an American aircraft manufacturer of the late 1920s

George C. Yunker, was head of a tractor agency in Dodge City, Kansas. He founded the Yunker Aircraft company in Wichita, hiring W.E. Laird as production manager. The company contracted Knoll Aircraft Company to produce some models. The company went into receivership to C.V. Snyder in 1930 with $230 (equivalent to $4,433 in 2025) owed in labor.

== Aircraft ==
Summary of aircraft built by Yunker Aircraft Company
| Model name | First flight | Number built | Type |
|---|---|---|---|
| Yunker Y-1-165 | 1929 | 1 | Biplane |
| Yunker Y-2-165 | 1929 | 1 | Biplane |
