= Vulcan Aircraft =

Vulcan Aircraft Corporation
- Founded: 1928
- Defunct: 1929
- Headquarters: Portsmouth, Ohio
- Key people: William Burke
- Parent: Vulcan Last Company

Vulcan Aircraft Corporation was an American aircraft manufacturer.

== History ==
William Burke founded the Vulcan Last Company, a shoe making concern that branched into golf clubs and accessories. By 1927, The Lindbergh boom inspired many to enter the aviation industry. In 1928, Burke partnered with two brothers, Harvey and Wilson Doyle to develop a monoplane of their design. On 31 March 1928, the first example flew from Raven Rock airport Portsmouth, OH. Seven examples of the $2500 Vulcan American Moth Monoplane were built just before the Great Depression set in.

Vulcan would promote its aircraft by touring from city to city golf courses having promoter Benny Martinez parachute with a set of Vulcan golf clubs. Martinez eventually broke his leg and Vulcan's chief pilot Pat Love died a year later in a crash.

The Doyle Brothers left the company after Wilson was passed over for plant manager. They went on to develop a similar monoplane forming the Doyle Aero Corporation in Baltimore, Maryland to produce the Doyle Aero O-2 Oriole. After Burke's death from a heart attack, Vulcan was sold to the Davis Aircraft Company in Richmond, Indiana, marketing the parasol as the Davis V-3.

== Aircraft ==
- Vulcan American Moth Monoplane - 2-seat parasol monoplane, first flight 1928, 7 built
