= Davis Aircraft =

Davis Aircraft Corporation
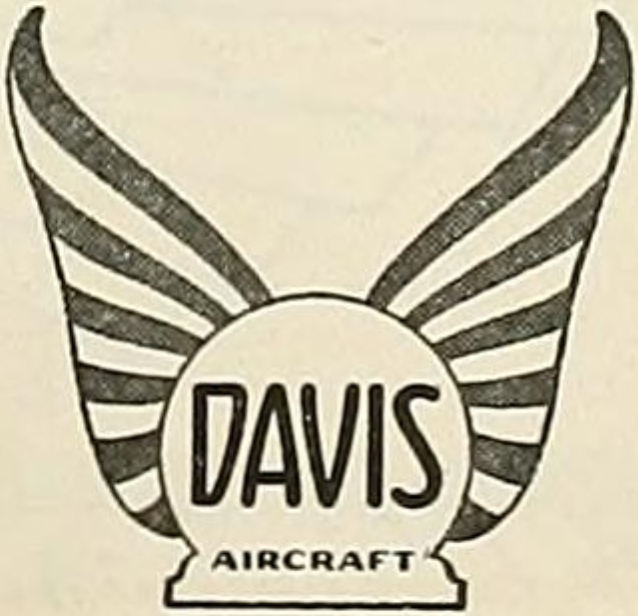
- Industry: Aircraft Manufacturer
- Founded: 1929
- Defunct: 1930
- Headquarters: Richmond, Indiana
- Key people: Walter C. Davis

Davis Aircraft Corporation was an American aircraft manufacturer.

The Davis Aircraft Corporation was founded by Walter C. Davis after the sale of the Walter C. Davis Motor Car Company in 1928. The company was formed with the purchase and merger of the Vulcan Aircraft company, and Baltimore, Maryland based Doyle Aero Company securing the rights to the Vulcan American Moth parasol. The American Moth was modified by engineer Dwight Huntington, and certified as the Davis V-3 on 6 September 1929. Weeks later the Wall Street crash of 1929 occurred. An updated Davis W-1 (ATC#256) was certified on 8 November 1929. Davis Aircraft ceased aircraft operations after a fire destroyed the manufacturing hangar and several aircraft at the height of the depression. Several aircraft were finished out of spare parts, but the company transitioned to making lawnmowers in 1932

A different Davis Aircraft opened in 1951.

== Aircraft ==
Model name	First flight	Number built	Type
Davis V-3	1929	23	Parasol Monoplane
Davis D-1	1929	38	Parasol Monoplane
Davis Racer	1929	1	Parasol Monoplane
