= Buckley LC-4 =

LC-4

General information
- Type: Passenger monoplane
- National origin: United States of America
- Manufacturer: Buckley Aircraft Co.
- Designer: William Bushnell Stout
- Number built: 1

History
- Manufactured: 1930
- Introduction date: 1931 National Aircraft Show

The Buckley LC-4 "Wichcraft" was an advanced all metal monoplane built by the short-lived Buckley Aircraft Company.

== Design and development ==
The Buckley LC-4 was one of two airplanes built by the Buckley Aircraft company in Wichita, Kansas at the beginning of the Great Depression. The project was under the direction of Frank Smith. William Bushnell Stout became a part-owner of the company and the use of corrugated aluminum construction that Stout used with his prior company Stout Metal Airplane was passed along in the Buckley designs.

The LC-4 was an all-metal aircraft with a conventional landing gear. The aircraft featured an enclosed cabin and corrugated aluminum construction on the wing and tail surfaces. The dual wing spars were built up from extruded aluminum riveted together in a truss arrangement similar to the Ford Trimotor. The first and only example was completed on 6 December 1930 and certified on 13 June 1931.

== Operational history ==
The LC-4 was displayed at the 1931 National Aircraft Show. The Yellow Air Cab Company signed orders for 200 to be built, but did not follow through. The prototype was sold to Deets Air Service in Nebraska following the bankruptcy of Buckley Aircraft.

== Specifications (Buckley LC-4) ==
Data from National Air and Space Museum

General characteristics

- Capacity: 4
- Wingspan: 52 ft (16 m)
- Powerplant: 1 × Pratt & Whitney R-985 Wasp Junior radial engine, 300 hp (220 kW)
