= Savoia-Marchetti S.56 =

S.56
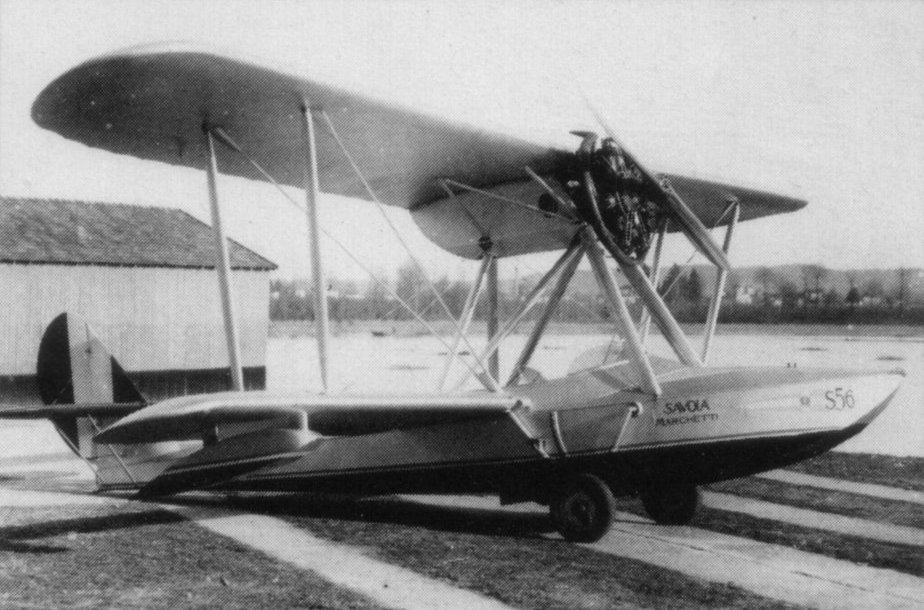

General information
- Type: Biplane flying boat
- National origin: Italy
- Manufacturer: Savoia-Marchetti
- Designer: Alessandro Marchetti
- Primary users: United States Army Air Corps Regia Aeronautica; New York City Police Department
- Number built: 70 circa

History
- Introduction date: 1927
- First flight: 1924
- Variant: Budd BB-1 Pioneer

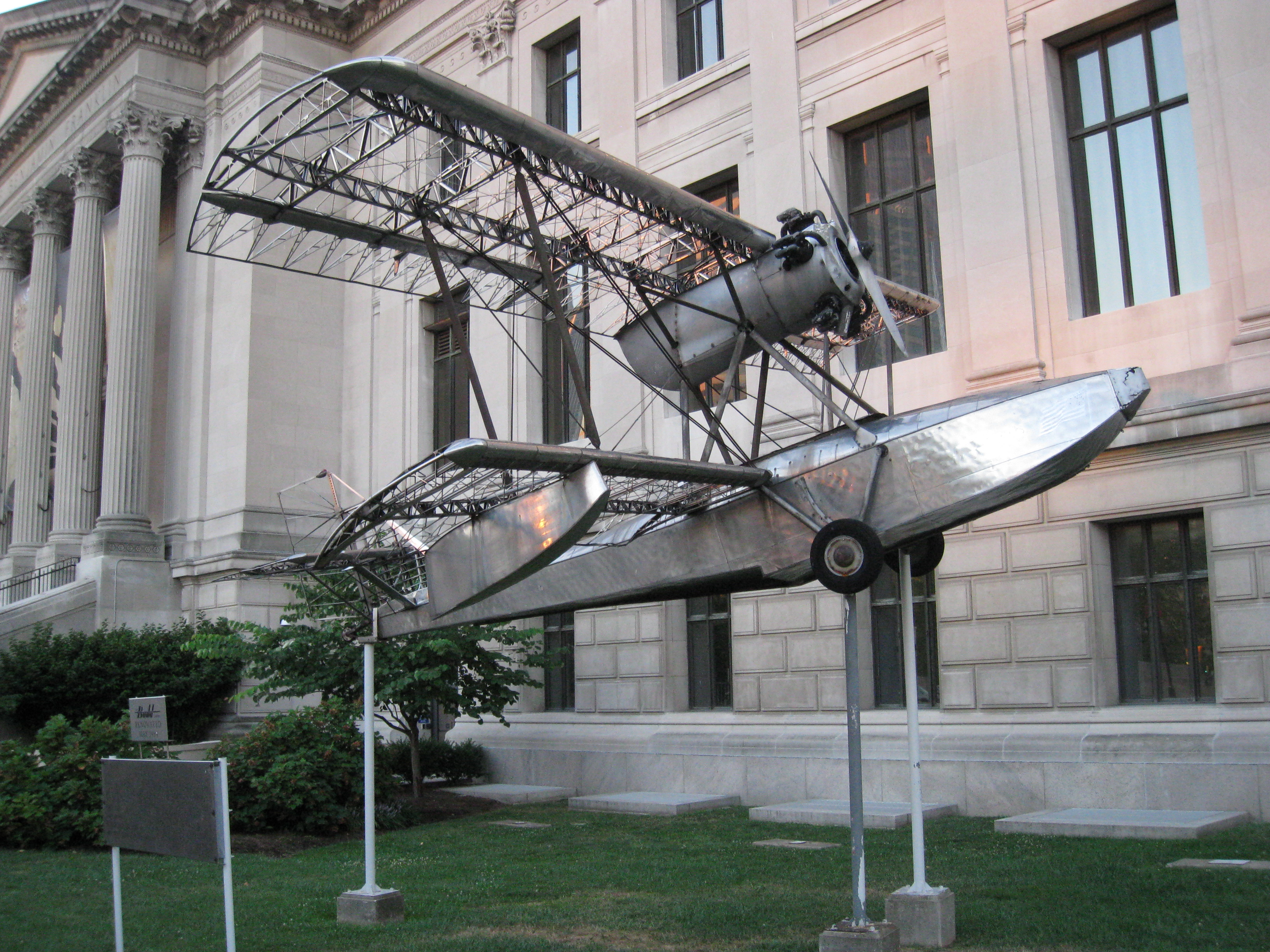
The Budd BB-1 Pioneer in front of the Franklin Institute.

The Savoia-Marchetti S.56 was an Italian single-engine biplane flying boat trainer and tourer, built by Savoia-Marchetti.

Of unequal span, the upper longer than the lower, of wooden construction. Instructor and student sat side by side in separate cockpits, with dual controls; a third cockpit was located just aft that. It used a 52 kW (70 hp) Anzani.

The S.56A had a slightly longer span and 60 kW (80 hp) Anzani, and was turned into an amphibian by addition of manually retractable landing gear. Private owners and flying clubs purchased at least 12, and Regia Aeronautica operated four (differing in engine specification, including 96 kW {115 hp} FIAT A.53, 101 kW {135 hp} FIAT A.54, and Walter Venus radial engines, among others).

The S.56A proved popular in the U.S., and the American Aeronautical Corporation (AAC) set up licence production in 1929, relying on the 67 kW (90 hp) Kinner K5 radials for power for three two-place aircraft and over 40 three-seaters.

This was followed in 1930 by the S.56B, powered by the 93 kW (125 hp) Kinner B-5, with an enclosed cockpit. Another was converted to a single-seater and given additional fuel tanks, as the S.56C, for an attempted round-the-world flight by American businessman Smith Reynolds.

In 1931, the Budd Company built an all-metal S.56 as the Budd BB-1 Pioneer.

== Operators ==
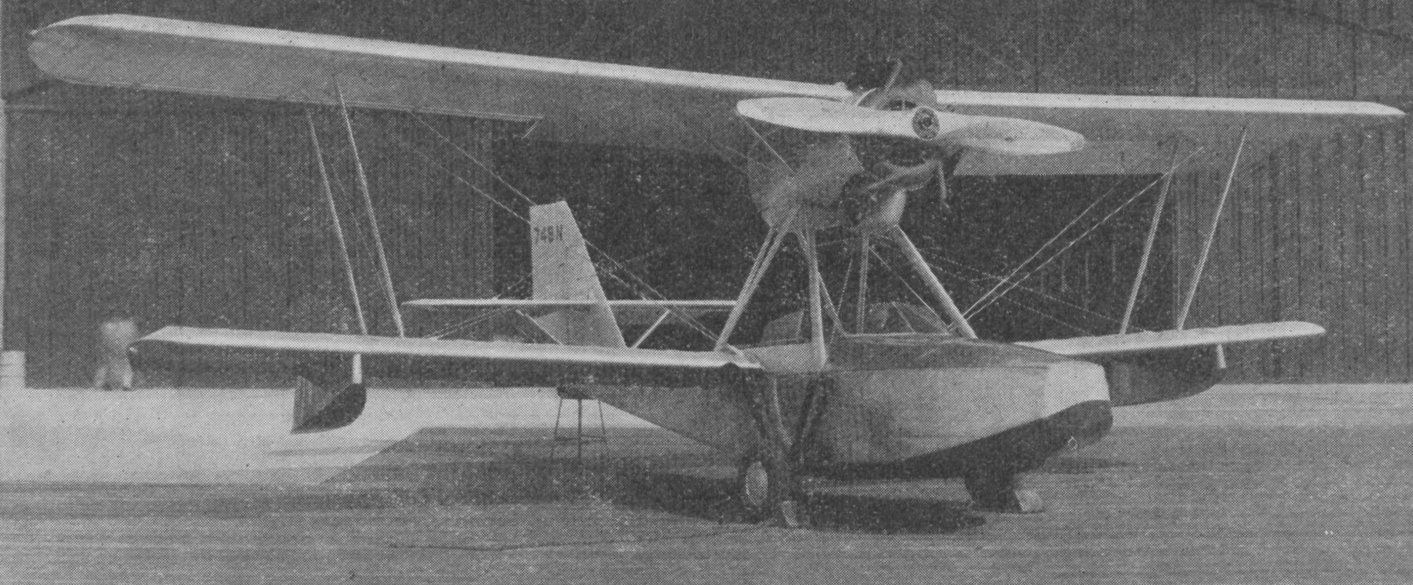
AAC S-56A photo from L'Aerophile January 1932

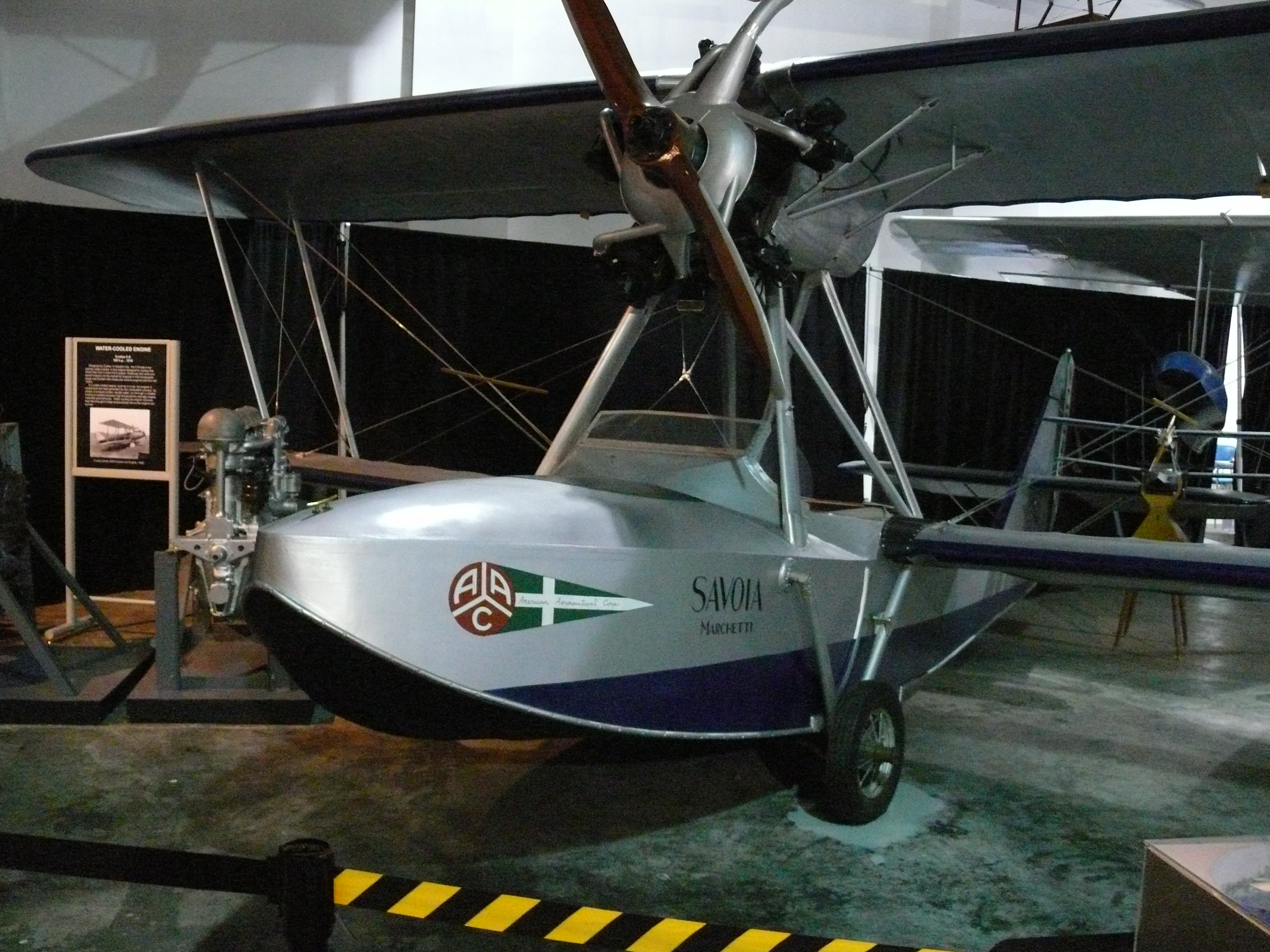
Savoia-Marchetti S.56 in the Cradle of Aviation Museum. This is one of two surviving planes.

=== Military operators ===
Kingdom of Italy

- Regia Aeronautica

United States

- United States Army Air Corps

Romania

- Royal Romanian Naval Aviation

=== Civilian and government operators ===
United States

- New York City Police Department operated 6 biplanes built under license in the US by American Aeronautical Corporation

== Aircraft on display ==
- NC349N, built under licence in the US by American Aeronautical Corporation and used by police during the Prohibition years to intercept rum smugglers is in the Cradle of Aviation Museum, Long Island, New York.
- A restored S.56 is on display at the renovated terminal building at Smith Reynolds Airport, in Winston Salem, North Carolina, North Carolina.

== Specifications (S.56B) ==
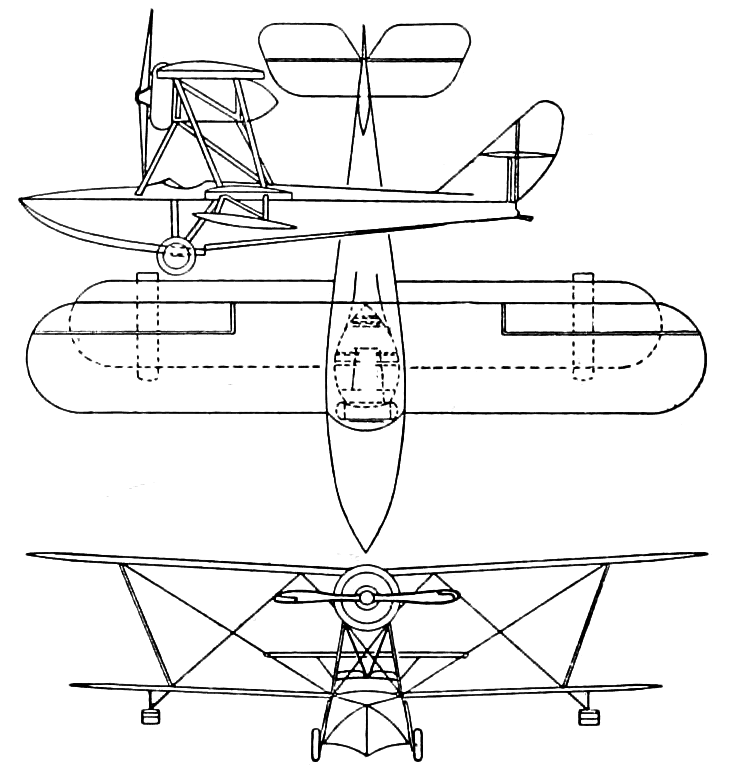
Savoia Marchetti S-56 3-view drawing from Aero Digest June 1929

Data from Encyclopedia of World Aircraft

General characteristics

- Crew: 1 or 2
- Capacity: 1 or 2 passengers
- Length: 7.8 m (25 ft 7 in)
- Wingspan: 10.72 m (35 ft 2 in)
- Height: 2.99 m (9 ft 9.75 in)
- Wing area: 26.5 m^{2} (285.25 sq ft)
- Empty weight: 658 kg (1,450 lb)
- Gross weight: 975 kg (2,150 lb)
- Powerplant: 1 × Kinner B-5 radial , 93 kW (125 hp)

Performance

- Maximum speed: 178 km/h (111 mph, 96 kn)

== See also ==
Related lists

- List of military aircraft of the United States
- List of flying boats and floatplanes
