= Vulcan American Moth Monoplane =

American Moth
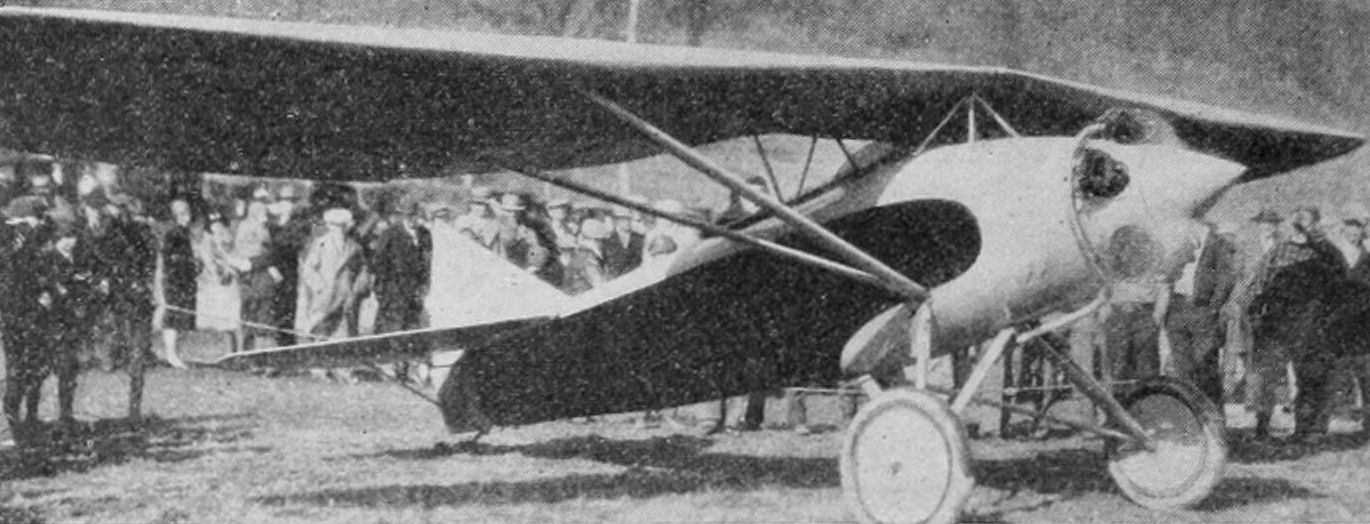

General information
- Type: Light aircraft
- National origin: United States
- Manufacturer: Vulcan Aircraft Co,
- Designer: Harvey and Wilson Keyser Doyle
- Number built: 8

History
- First flight: 1928

The Vulcan American Moth Monoplane was an early parasol-wing monoplane developed by the Doyle brothers.

== Development ==
Wilson Doyle graduated Harvard in 1925, and his brother Harvey from Yale the same year. They moved to Detroit looking for employment in aviation and backing for a new aircraft design. Their first job was working as draftsmen on the ZMC-2 airship, then construction on the Hess H-1 Bluebird line. Ford Trimotor engineer Jan Pavlecka introduced the brothers to William Burke of the Vulcan Last Company, which produced golf clubs among other items. They founded the Vulcan Aircraft Corporation. The name of their first aircraft was chosen to capitalize on the popularity of the de Havilland Tiger Moth.

== Design ==
The American Moth is a strut-braced, high-wing monoplane with conventional landing gear and a tandem open cockpit, requiring the front passenger to enter through the removable backrest between cockpits. The fuselage is made of welded steel tubing with fabric covering. The tapered wings use spruce spars with aluminum wing ribs. The ailerons and elevators used aluminum push-pull tubes rather than cables for control deflection. The standard factory paint scheme was scarlet, red and ivory.

A selection of engines could be fitted; 60 or 90 hp Le Blond, 60 or 80 hp Anzani, or a 70 hp Ryan-Siemens.

== Operational history ==
Pathe News filmed ground runs of the American Moth. The first test flight was flown by Pat Love. Vulcan promoted its aircraft by touring from city to city golf courses having promoter Benny Martinez parachute with a set of Vulcan golf clubs. Martinez eventually broke his leg and Vulcan's chief pilot Pat Love died a year later in a crash. The 3,300 mile tour concluded in March 1928. Later that year, Burke died of a heart attack and the assets of the company were sold to Davis Aircraft in Richmond, Indiana. Dwight Huntington modified the drawings to produce the Davis V-3, Davis D-1, and a custom racer totaling about 60 aircraft built, before the company stopped production in 1929 after a doping-process fueled fire.

== Variants ==
- Davis V-3

== Specifications (60 hp Le Blond engine) ==
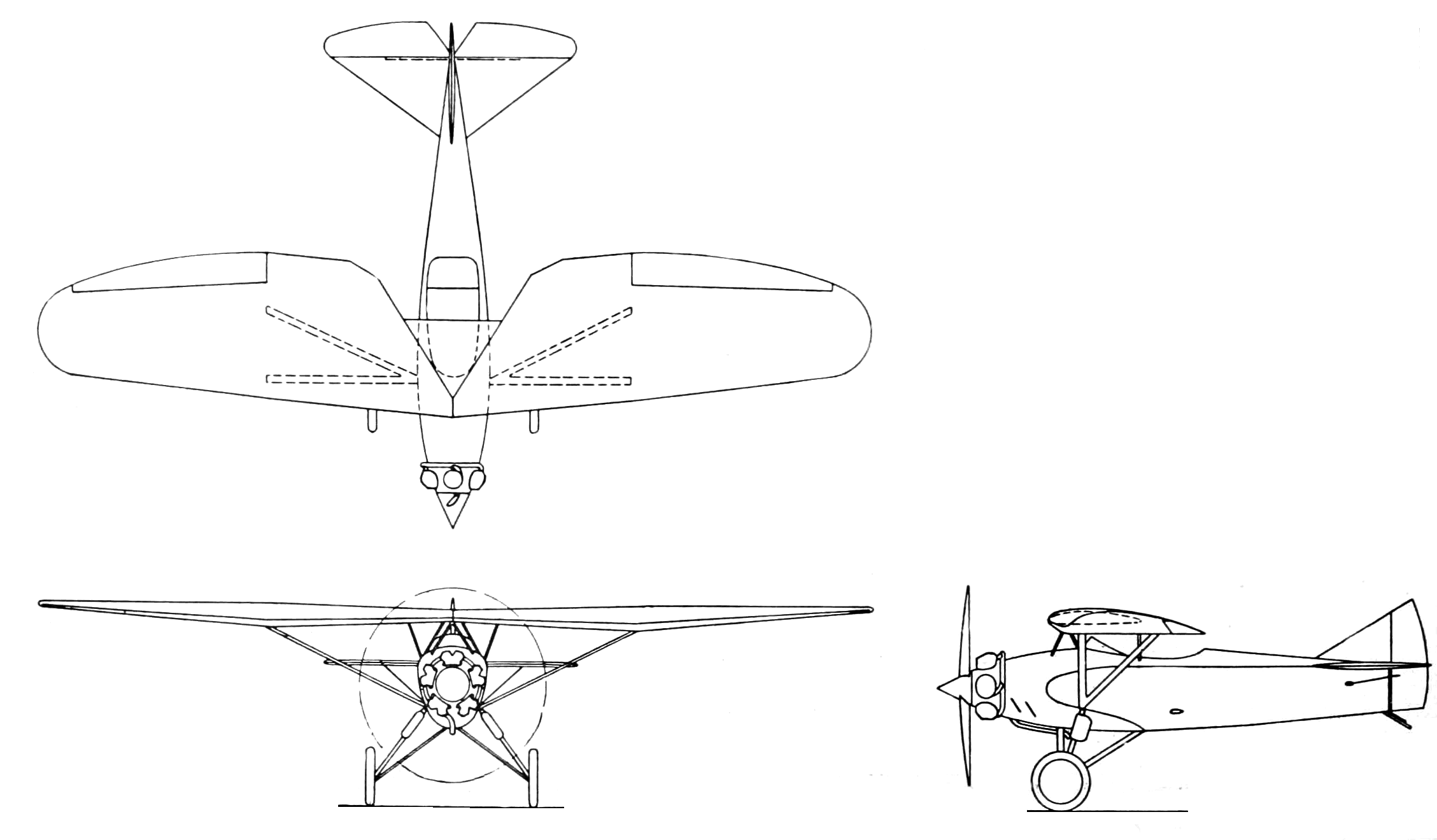
Vulcan American Moth 3-view drawing from Aero Digest May 1928

Data from Sport Aviation and Flight

General characteristics

- Crew: 1 pilot
- Capacity: 1 passenger
- Length: 18 ft (5.5 m)
- Wingspan: 30 ft (9.1 m)
- Height: 6 ft 9 in (2.06 m)
- Wing area: 142 sq ft (13.2 m^{2})
- Empty weight: 660 lb (299 kg)
- Gross weight: 1,200 lb (544 kg)
- Fuel capacity: 25 U.S. gallons (95 L; 21 imp gal)
- Powerplant: 1 × LeBlond 5 5-cylinder radial engine, 60 hp (45 kW)
- Propellers: 2-bladed Hartzell

Performance

- Maximum speed: 88 kn (101 mph, 163 km/h)
- Stall speed: 33 kn (38 mph, 61 km/h)
- Range: 413 nmi (475 mi, 764 km) maximum
- Service ceiling: 10,000 ft (3,000 m)
- Rate of climb: 750 ft/min (3.8 m/s) at sea level
- Wing loading: 8.4 lb/sq ft (41 kg/m^{2})

Related development

- Doyle Aero O-2 Oriole
- Davis D-1

Aircraft of comparable role, configuration, and era

- Heath Parasol
