= American Aeronautical Corporation =

Aircraft manufacturer

Coordinates: 40°49′37.8″N 73°41′59.2″W

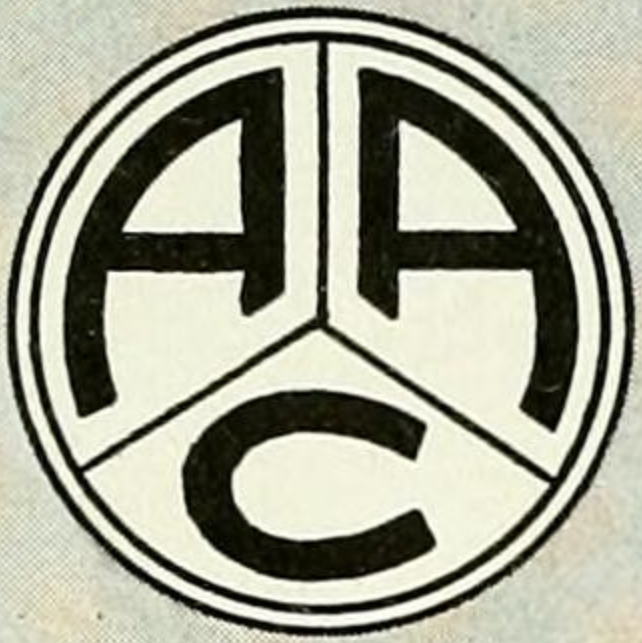
- Industry: Aerospace
- Founded: October 1928
- Founder: Enea Bossi Sr.
- Headquarters: Port Washington, New York, United States

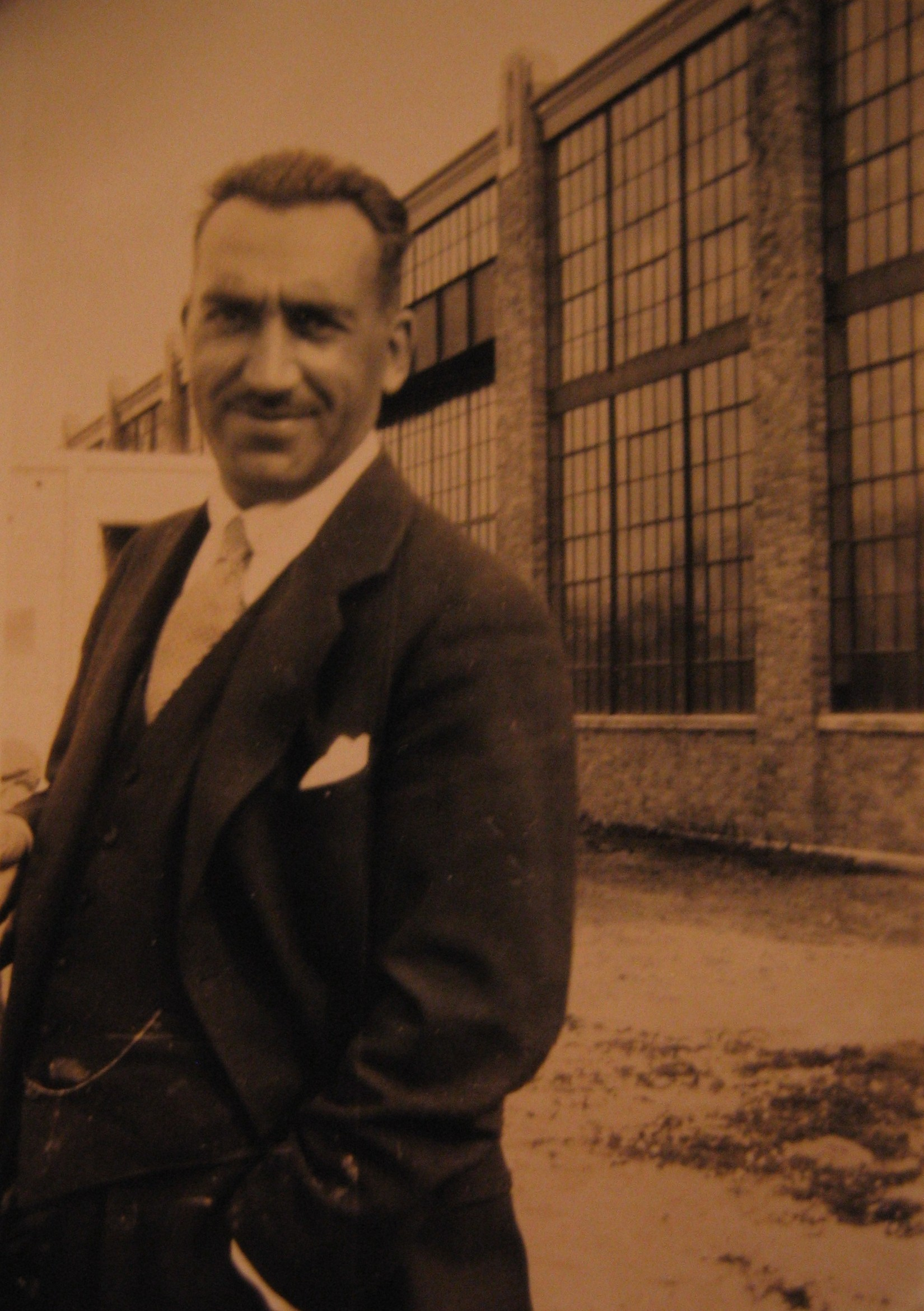
Enea Bossi in front of the AAC factory in Port Washington, New York

The American Aeronautical Corporation (AAC) was founded in October 1928 by Enea Bossi, located at 730 Fifth Avenue in Port Washington, New York. Its purpose was to build Savoia-Marchetti seaplanes under license. Licenses were acquired for both the S-55 and the S-56 and both were tested at Miller Army Air Field, but only the latter made it to production.

== History ==
The S-56 was first introduced in Italy two years earlier as a three-seat amphibious aircraft powered by air-cooled radial engines in the 90- to 110 horsepower (82 kW) range. The AAC fitted it with an American Kinner engine. Following on the heels of a boom in the aviation industry in America – largely attributed to Charles Lindbergh’s flight in 1927 – it was among the few foreign designs to be manufactured in the United States under Approved Type Certificates (ATCs) and, at $7,300, was also the first low-priced amphibious aircraft on the U.S. market. The size and price of the vehicle appealed to recreational aviators, despite its difficult handling. On water, the plane lacked a rudder; on ground, the plane only had a non-steerable tail skid (that is: no conventional brakes); and in the air, when the wheels were extended, the added drag complicated the steering.

Thirty-six S-56s were built under ATC A-287, which was awarded on 4 January 1930. The S-56 became the first plane used by the New York City Police Department, which used it to enforce flying regulations, assist with sea rescues, and to chase rum-runners during the Prohibition era. A follow-up design, the S-56B, proved even more successful. ATC A-336, for the S-56B design, was awarded on 11 July 1930. The S-56B included a more powerful 125 horsepower (93 kW) Kinner B-5 engine and sold for $7,825. Whereas the prices for the S-56 and S-56B were modest for the time, the Great Depression caused sales to drop significantly by 1933. Two original AAC S-56 planes exist today: one of which is on display at the Cradle of Aviation Museum in Garden City, New York.^{(photos)}

In December 1928, the AAC named Captain Hugo (Ugo) Veniero d'Annunzio, son of Gabriele d'Annunzio, as a director and vice president. Captain d'Annunzio had never arrived in the United States in 1917 to supervise the manufacture of Caproni bombing planes at the Fisher Body plant, as an agent of Isotta Fraschini.

With a factory already in place in Port Washington, on Long Island, the AAC sponsored the construction of a seaplane base in the town. It was officially dedicated by the striking of a bronze medal on 14 September 1929. The rectangular medal is sized 4 x 2 15/16" (102 x 73mm) and features a one-sided print consisting of a flying boat and an amphibian aloft in the upper-center, a sketch of the projected terminal building at the bottom, a winged male figure at lower left, and at right, the words "Laying of Cornerstone, New York Seaplane Airport September 14th 1929 American Aeronautical Corporation". Prominent speakers at the dedication included Edward P. Warner.

In 1933, the American Aeronautical Corporation facility was purchased by Pan Am and became the base for early survey flights for transatlantic air service. In 1937, the first regular commercial transatlantic airline service in America started from the facility. International seaplane flights continued into the early 1940s.

== See also ==
- Sands Point Seaplane Base
