= Fleet Canada =

Fleet Canada Incorporated
- Industry: Aerospace
- Founded: 2006
- Headquarters: Fort Erie, Ontario, Canada
- Key people: Jean Sebastien Coulaud, President and CEO
- Products: aerospace structures, component parts, and assemblies
- Number of employees: 150
- Website: Fleet Canada Inc

Fleet Canada Inc., the successor to the Fleet Aerospace Inc division of Magellan Aerospace Inc, is a manufacturer of aerospace structures, component parts, and assemblies to approved design data. It is located in Fort Erie, Ontario, Canada, where it has operated from the same site for more than 85 years, during which the facility has grown to over 500,000 square feet (46,000 m^{2}). Capabilities include tooling, detail fabrication, bonding, and finishing, chemical processing, heat treating, and NDT (LPI).

Established in 2006, Fleet Canada Inc. has not been affiliated with Magellan Aerospace Inc since the closure of Fleet Aircraft in 2003.

== History ==
The company was formed in 2006, but its history can be traced back to Reuben Fleet, who commenced manufacturing operations of Fleet Aircraft on March 23, 1930. A state-of-the-art facility for the day, the plant promptly began turning out complete aircraft for military and civilian training. By 1938, Fleet had enlarged the factory to ten times its original size and the Fleet Finch Trainer had become the primary training aircraft for the British Commonwealth Air Training Plan. After the war, Fleet produced a successful light civilian 2-seater, the Fleet Canuck. The making of complete aircraft ceased in the early 1950s and the manufacture of quality structural components became the core business.

On April 1, 2025 Fleet was sold to De Havilland Canada.

== Clients ==
Fleet Canada's products are sold to various aerospace clients:

- Boeing — parts used for CH — 47 Chinook Helicopter
- Bombardier Aerospace — parts used for Bombardier Q series
- Viking Air — parts used for Twin Otter 400 Series (later merged with DHC)
- De Havilland Canada — parts used for DHC-6, CL-215, CL-415 & DHC-515

== Products ==
- Tail Boom for helicopters
- Airframe structural assemblies
- Longerons/Stringers
- Bulkheads
- Floor Panels
- Airframe structural assemblies
- Rib Doubler
