= Xiao Huang =

Chinese-Canadian mechanical engineer

Xiao Huang is a Chinese and Canadian mechanical engineer whose research expertise includes superalloys, additive manufacturing, and gas turbines. She is a professor in the Department of Mechanical and Aerospace Engineering at Carleton University.

== Education and career ==
Huang has bachelor's and master's degrees from Shanghai Jiao Tong University. She completed her Ph.D. at the University of Manitoba. Her 1994 dissertation, A Microstructural Study of Heat Affected Zone Microfissuring of Electron Beam Welds in Cast Alloy 718, was supervised by M. C. Chaturvedi.

She worked in industry for Bristol Aerospace in Winnipeg from 1991 to 1998, and at JDS Uniphase in Ottawa from 2001 to 2002, before returning to academia in 2002 as an assistant professor in the Department of Mechanical and Aerospace Engineering at Carleton University. She was promoted to associate professor in 2005 and full professor in 2009.

== Recognition ==
As well as receiving best paper awards from the Minerals, Metals and Materials Society, American Welding Society, and American Society of Mechanical Engineers (ASME), Huang was named as an ASME Fellow in 2018.

== Book ==
Huang is a coauthor of the book Superalloys: Alloying and Performance (with Blaine Geddes and Hugo Leon, ASM International, 2010).
