= Fleet Fawn =

1930s built trainer by Fleet Aircraft

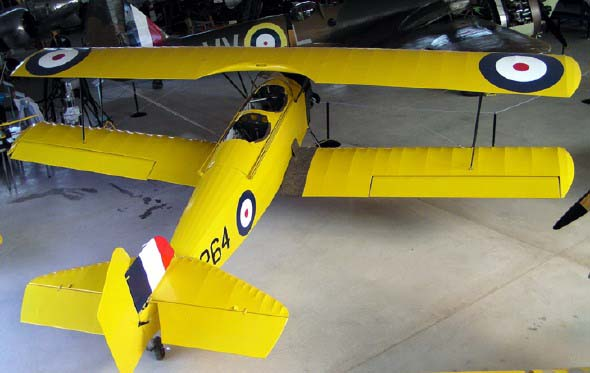
- Fleet Fawn Mk I

General information
- Type: Trainer
- Manufacturer: Fleet Aircraft
- Designer: Reuben H. Fleet
- Status: Retired
- Primary users: Royal Canadian Air Force Department of National Defence (Canada)
- Number built: 71 (Fleet Model 2, Fleet Model 7)

History
- Manufactured: 1931- 1938
- Introduction date: 1931
- First flight: 27 June 1930 (Model 2 prototype)
- Retired: 1947

In the 1930s, Fleet Aircraft manufactured a series of single-engined, two-seat training aircraft, based on US designs. The Fleet Model 7B and Model 7C, known respectively as Fawn I and Fawn II were purchased by the RCAF as primary trainers. After years of reliable service, many were available for use in the British Commonwealth Air Training Plan during the Second World War while others remained as station "hacks."

== Design and development ==
As a subsidiary of Consolidated Aircraft set up in 1928, Fleet Aircraft had factories at Buffalo, NY, and across the border at Fort Erie, Ontario. The Canadian company produced a series of single-engined, two-seat training aircraft, based on US designs but including variants adapted specifically to Royal Canadian Air Force (RCAF) needs.

The Fleet Model 7 began as an American design, the Model 2, originally designed by Consolidated. Besides two prototypes imported from the US, a total of seven Fleet Model 2 trainers were built in Canada for civilian operators.

Derived from earlier Fleet Model 2, the Model 7 featured an aircraft structure consisting of a fabric-covered, welded-steel fuselage with metal panels forward of the wooden cockpits. It had steel-tube faring formers and wooden stringers. The wings were single bay of equal spans and wire braced. The upper wing was made in one piece and constructed with two solid Spruce spars. Ailerons were found only on the bottom wings. Stamped aluminium alloy ribs were used to construct the wings and steel-tube compression struts were at the interplane and centre section of the wings. Interlaced between the wings were streamlined landing and flying wires. Except for a broader chord tail-fin introduced after the first production series, while retaining the original rudder of the Model 2, the Model 7 was superficially identical to its earlier predecessor.

A variety of equipment could be fitted to the Canadian variant including optional wheel brakes, a tail skid or tail wheel arrangement, a fuselage belly tank and a fixed cockpit enclosure or "coupe top" with hinged sides. During the late 1930s, a sliding cockpit enclosure became standard equipment of all RCAF Fawns. The aircraft could also be configured to use skis, floats or wheels. The main landing gear's radius rods (the members joining the inner ends of the wheel axles to each opposing corner of the fuselage) on the Models 2 and 7 were notable for having the one coming from the left wheel "looped", with an open oval piece near its middle, so the one from the right mainwheel could pass right through it.

Engine choices further dictated the different variants of the Fawn design: the Mk I (Fleet Model 7B) with a 125 hp (93 kW) Kinner B-5 engine was superseded by the Mk II (Fleet Model 7C) powered by a 140 hp (100 kW) Armstrong Siddeley Civet seven-cylinder radial engine. Although the RCAF ordered the bulk of the production runs, 12 civil-registered Model 7Bs were completed for the Department of National Defence to be issued to flying clubs.

== Operational history ==
The Fleet Model 7 first saw service with the Royal Canadian Air Force in 1931 when 20 Mk Is were delivered. As a two-seater primary trainer they were felt to have excellent flying characteristics together with a rugged strength which inspired confidence in novice pilots. The RCAF was very impressed with the Fleet Fawn and claimed that the aircraft was one of the factors which improved its flying standards during the 1930s.

A total of 31 Model 7Cs were built between 1931 and 1938 at the Fleet Aircraft of Canada's plant at Fort Erie, Ontario, with the first deliveries made in 1936. Due to the smoother, quieter and more powerful engine, the Model 7C was considered the definitive variant.

Forty three Fleet Model 7B and C trainers were operational with the Royal Canadian Air Force when war was declared in 1939. In service during the Second World War, the RCAF adopted the name "Fawn" for both variants. Along with the more modern follow-up design, the Fleet Finch, Fleet Fawns helped train thousands of pilots under the British Commonwealth Air Training Plan during the war. The Fawn remained in service with the RCAF until 1947.

== Variants ==
Model 7A
One example completed with a 100 hp (75 kW) Kinner K-5 radial engine
Fleet Model 7B (Fawn Mk I)
32 examples with a 125 hp (93 kW) Kinner B-5 engine five-cylinder, radial engine (earliest series also had an 80 hp (60 kW) five cylinder Armstrong Siddeley Genet radial engine and a "left-hand" prop)
Fleet Model 7C (Fawn Mk II)
31 examples with a 140 hp (100 kW) Armstrong Siddeley Civet seven-cylinder, radial engine
Model 7G
A "one-off" conversion of a Model B with a 120 hp (89 kW) de Havilland Gipsy III, four-cylinder, inline engine (converted back to Model 7B standard)
CATA (Fleet) 150
A conversion of Fleet 7 biplanes in Argentina, powered by 150 hp (110 kW) Lycoming O-320 engines.

== Operators ==
Canada

- Royal Canadian Air Force

== Survivors ==
A number of airframes are still in existence including a Fleet Fawn Mk II CF-CHF (c/n 58 RCAF 220) on display at the Reynolds-Alberta Museum in Wetaskiwin, Alberta.

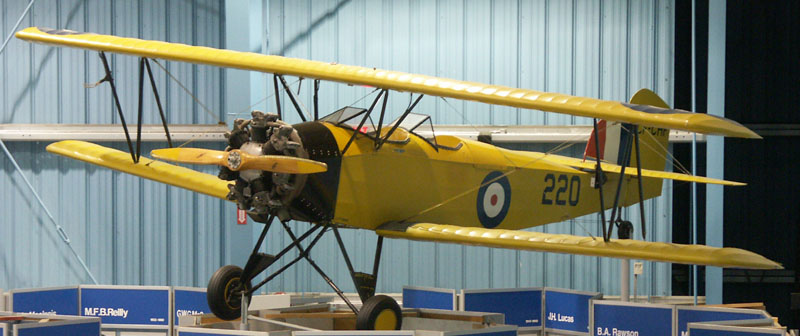
Fleet Fawn Mk II on display at the Reynolds-Alberta Aviation Museum, c. 2006, with Fleet Finch main landing gear fitted

Fleet 7 Fawn MK1 on display at the Yanks Air Museum in Chino, California.

== Specifications (Fleet Fawn Mk II) ==
Information based on Fleet: The Flying Years

- Manufacturer: Fleet Aircraft of Canada
- Crew/Passengers: two pilots in tandem
- Powerplant: one 125 hp (93 kW) Kinner B-5 five-cylinder radial piston engine
- Dimensions
  - Length: 21 ft 8 in (6.5 m)
  - Height: 7 ft 10 in (2.4 m)
  - Span: 28 ft 0 in (8.5 m)
  - Wing area: 194 sq ft (18.06 sq m)
- Weights
  - Empty: 1,130 lb (513 kg)
  - Gross: 1,860 lb (844 kg)
- Performance
  - Maximum speed: 112 mph (180 km/h)
  - Cruising speed: 87 mph (140 km/h)
  - Service ceiling: 15,500 ft (4,724 m)
  - Range: 320 mi (515 km)
- Armament: None

== See also ==
Related development

- Fleet Model 1
- Fleet Finch

Related lists

- List of interwar military aircraft
