= SCISAT-1 =

Canadian satellite

- Mission type: Remote sensing
- Operator: Canadian Space Agency (CSA)
- COSPAR ID: 2003-036A
- SATCAT no.: 27858
- Website: www.asc-csa.gc.ca/eng/satellites/scisat/default.asp
- Mission duration: Planned: 2 years (minimum); Elapsed: 23 years, 2 months, 30 days

Spacecraft properties
- Manufacturer: Bristol Aerospace
- Launch mass: 260 kg (570 lb)

Start of mission
- Launch date: 13 August 2003, 02:09:33 UTC
- Rocket: Pegasus-XL F35
- Launch site: Vandenberg Runway 12/30
- Contractor: Orbital

Orbital parameters
- Reference system: Geocentric
- Regime: Low Earth
- Perigee altitude: 642 km (399 mi)
- Apogee altitude: 654 km (406 mi)
- Inclination: 73.9 degrees
- Period: 97.7 minutes
- Epoch: 12 August 2003, 22:10:00 UTC

SCISAT-1 is a Canadian satellite designed to make observations of the Earth's atmosphere. Its main instruments are an optical Fourier transform infrared spectrometer, the ACE-FTS Instrument, and an ultraviolet spectrophotometer, MAESTRO. These devices record spectra of the Sun, as sunlight passes through the Earth's atmosphere, making analyses of the chemical elements of the atmosphere possible.

== Design and construction ==
SCISAT is a relatively small satellite weighing 150 kg (330 lb). It is partly drum shaped and measures about 1.5 metres by 1.5 metres. The Canadian Space Agency (CSA) coordinated its design, launch and use. The main contractors were Bristol Aerospace of Winnipeg, Manitoba, who were prime contractor for the bus, and ABB Bomem Inc. of Quebec City, Quebec who developed the ACE-FTS instrument. The total development cost of SCISAT, as estimated by the CSA in 2003, was about CDN$60M. As of 23 years after launch, the satellite and its instruments are still operating.

=== ACE-FTS ===
The ACE-FTS instrument is the main payload of the SCISAT-1 spacecraft. The primary scientific goal of the Atmospheric Chemistry Experiment (ACE) is to measure and understand the chemical and dynamical processes that control the distribution of ozone in the upper troposphere and stratosphere. The principle of ACE measurement is the solar occultation technique. A high inclination (74 degrees), low Earth orbit 650 km (400 mi) will provide ACE coverage of tropical, mid-latitudes and polar regions.

The spectrometer is an adapted version of the classical Michelson interferometer using an optimized optical layout. Its highly folded double-pass optical design results in a very high performance instrument with a compact size. A signal-to-noise ratio better than 100 is achieved, with a field-of-view of 1.25 mrad and an aperture diameter of 100 mm (4"). A semiconductor laser is used as the metrology source of the interferometer sub-system.

The auxiliary Visible/Near-infrared Imager (VNI) monitors aerosols based on the extinction of solar radiation using two filtered detectors at 0.525 and 1.02 micrometres. The instrument also includes a Suntracker mechanism providing fine pointing toward the radiometric center of the Sun with stability better than 3 μrad. The ACE-FTS instrument was launched on August 12, 2003.

ABB was the prime contractor for the design and manufacturing of the ACE-FTS instrument.

=== MAESTRO ===
The Measurements of Aerosol Extinction in the Stratosphere and Troposphere Retrieved by Occultation (MAESTRO) instrument aboard SCISAT-1 measures the vertical distribution of ozone, nitrogen dioxide, water vapour, and aerosols in the Earth's atmosphere. MAESTRO consists of a UV-VIS-NIR spectrophotometer that measures the 285-1030 nm spectral region.

== Orbit ==
SCISAT passes through the Earth's shadow 15 times per day, profiting from the occultation of the Sun to make a spectrographic analysis of the structure and chemistry of those parts of the upper atmosphere that are too high to be reached by balloons and airplanes and too low to be visited by orbiting satellites. This kind of analysis can help understand the depletion of the ozone layer and other upper atmosphere phenomena.

SCISAT was placed in low Earth orbit by a Pegasus rocket launched from a NASA Lockheed L-1011 carrier aircraft on August 12, 2003 from Vandenberg Air Force Base. Expected to operate for two to five years, it was still operational in 2025. Current information may be obtained from the ACE Mission Information for Public Data Release report.

The University of Waterloo, York University, the University of Toronto, and several other Canadian universities collaborated in the design of the experiments, and in several aspects of the testing of the satellite.
