= Fleet Finch =

Canadian training biplane

Finch
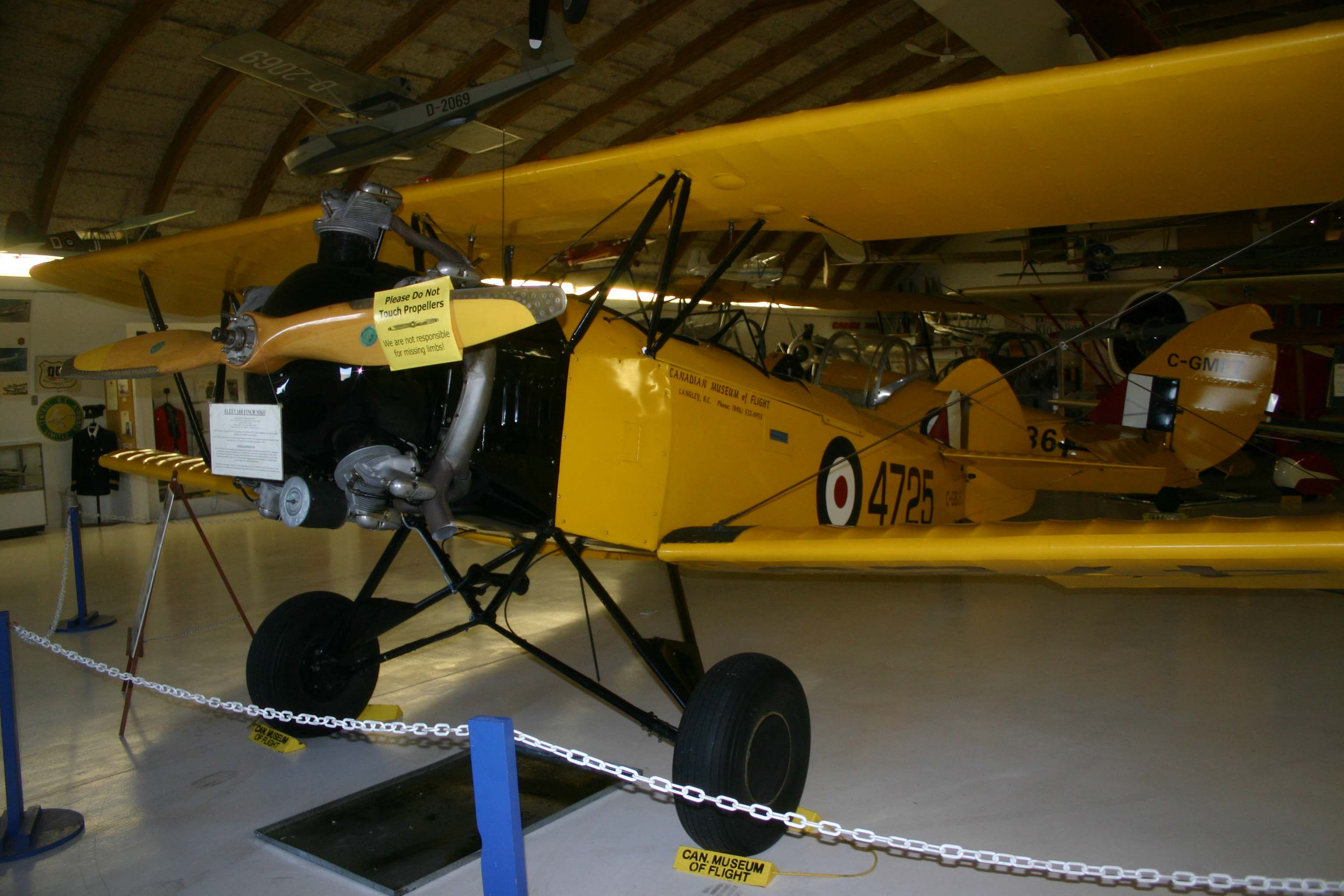
- Fleet Finch II at the Canadian Museum of Flight British Columbia

General information
- Type: Trainer
- Manufacturer: Fleet Aircraft
- Status: Retired
- Primary users: Royal Canadian Air Force Portugal
- Number built: 606

History
- Manufactured: 1939– 1941
- Introduction date: 1939
- First flight: 8 February 1939
- Retired: 1947

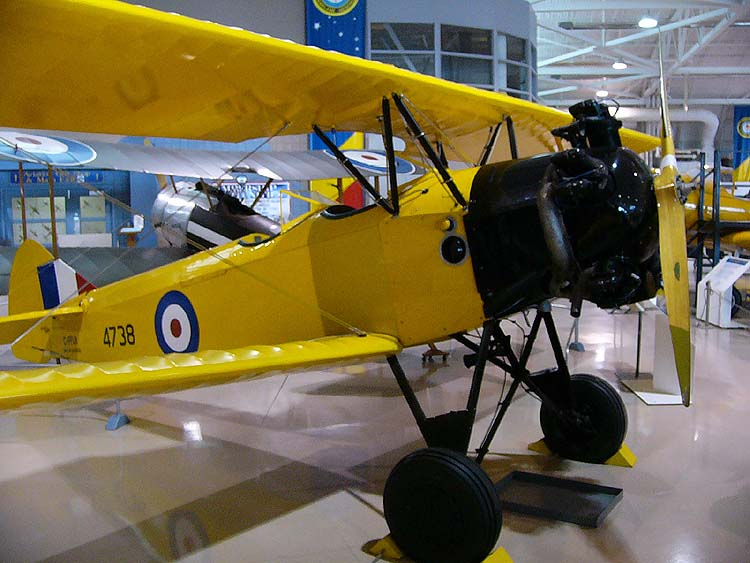
Fleet 16B Finch in the Canadian Warplane Heritage Museum Hamilton, Ontario – note centre-hinged main LG radius rods

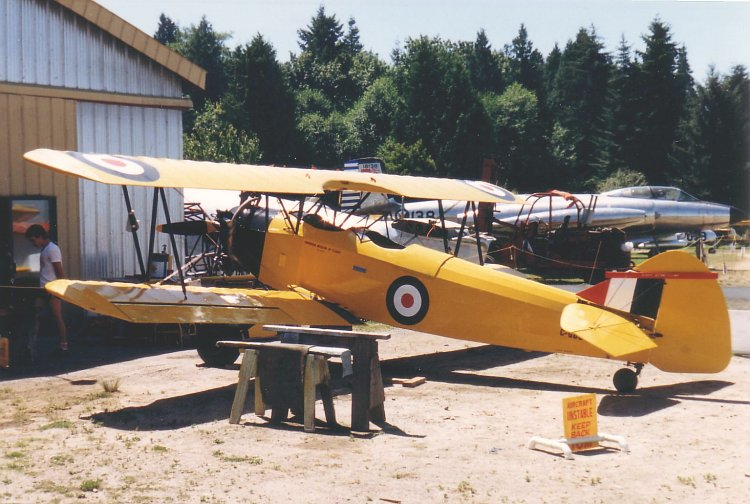
Fleet 16B Finch at the Canadian Museum of Flight in South Surrey BC, July 1988

The Fleet Finch (Fleet Model 16) is a two-seat, tandem training biplane produced by Fleet Aircraft of Fort Erie, Ontario. There were a number of variants mainly based on engine variations. Over several years beginning in 1939, a total of 447 Finches were built, nearly all (431) of them for use as elementary trainers in the British Commonwealth Air Training Plan (BCATP) during the Second World War.

== Design and development ==
The Fleet 16B Finch II was a progressive development of the original Consolidated Fleet primary trainer (Fleet 10), manufacture of which commenced in Canada by Fleet Aircraft in 1930. After a Royal Canadian Air Force (RCAF) evaluation in 1938 recommended a number of changes, a total of 431 Finch trainers were built for the RCAF between 1939 and 1941. The aircraft had conventional construction for the period with a welded steel-tube fuselage having Warren truss structure for its sides; and composite metal, wood and fabric design features, with Frise ailerons, a flat-bottom airfoiled, variable incidence (trimmable) lifting two-piece tailplane; and similarly "lifting airfoil" on the fixed vertical stabilizer, cambered into an airfoil on its port side only, to offset the P-factor of the propeller's swirling slipstream. The RCAF acquired the aircraft type as an elementary trainer. The Fleet 16 first entered RCAF service with tandem open cockpits, but the severity of the Canadian winter necessitated the introduction of a sliding canopy at an early stage in the trainer's service career. The earlier Model 10's centre-hinged main landing gear radius rods were retained for the Model 16 series, as these centre-hinged units had replaced the "looped" left mainwheel's radius rod design that had been on the even-earlier Fleet Models 1, 2 & 7 biplanes from their own origins in November 1928.

== Operational history ==
Startup of a Fleet Finch

The Finch was a mainstay of the RCAF prior to and during the early part of the Second World War, flying at the Elementary Flying Training Schools (EFTS) in parallel with the better known de Havilland Tiger Moth, also produced in Canada. The earlier Fleet Model 7 (Fleet Fawn) was also in use for primary training. During 1940, initial production problems were solved and timely deliveries were made to the RCAF, allowing the first training programs to start up. In the following year, the Portuguese Navy purchased ten Model 16Ds (ordered as 10Bs but changed to the higher powered variant) and later a further five 16Ds were delivered in 1942.

A total of 606 Fleet Finches were produced as Model 16s, the majority for the RCAF. They were used as initial trainers in the BCATP at no fewer than 12 Elementary Flight Training Schools across Canada. Both the Fleet Finch and Tiger Moth were later replaced by the Fairchild PT-26 Cornell. The Finch was progressively phased out of service from October 1944 with the last of the Model 16s struck off strength from the RCAF inventory in 1947.

== Variants ==
Model 10
Model was an improved Fleet 7 with a deeper rear fuselage from its nearly-level height dorsal turtledeck in side-view, a new two-piece horizontal tail/elevator and a better cockpit.
Model 10A
Model powered by 100 hp (75 kW) Kinner K-5 five-cylinder radial engine
Model 10B
Model powered by 125 hp (93 kW) Kinner B-5, five cylinder radial engine
Model 10D
Model powered by 160 hp (120 kW) Kinner R-5, five cylinder radial engine
Model 10-32D
32-foot-long span wing for high altitude operations in Mexico. Powered by 175 hp (130 kW) Kinner R5, five cylinder radial engine
Model 10E
Model powered by 145 hp (108 kW) Warner Super Scarab seven cylinder radial engine
Model 10F
Model powered by 145 hp (108 kW) Warner Super Scarab seven cylinder radial engine

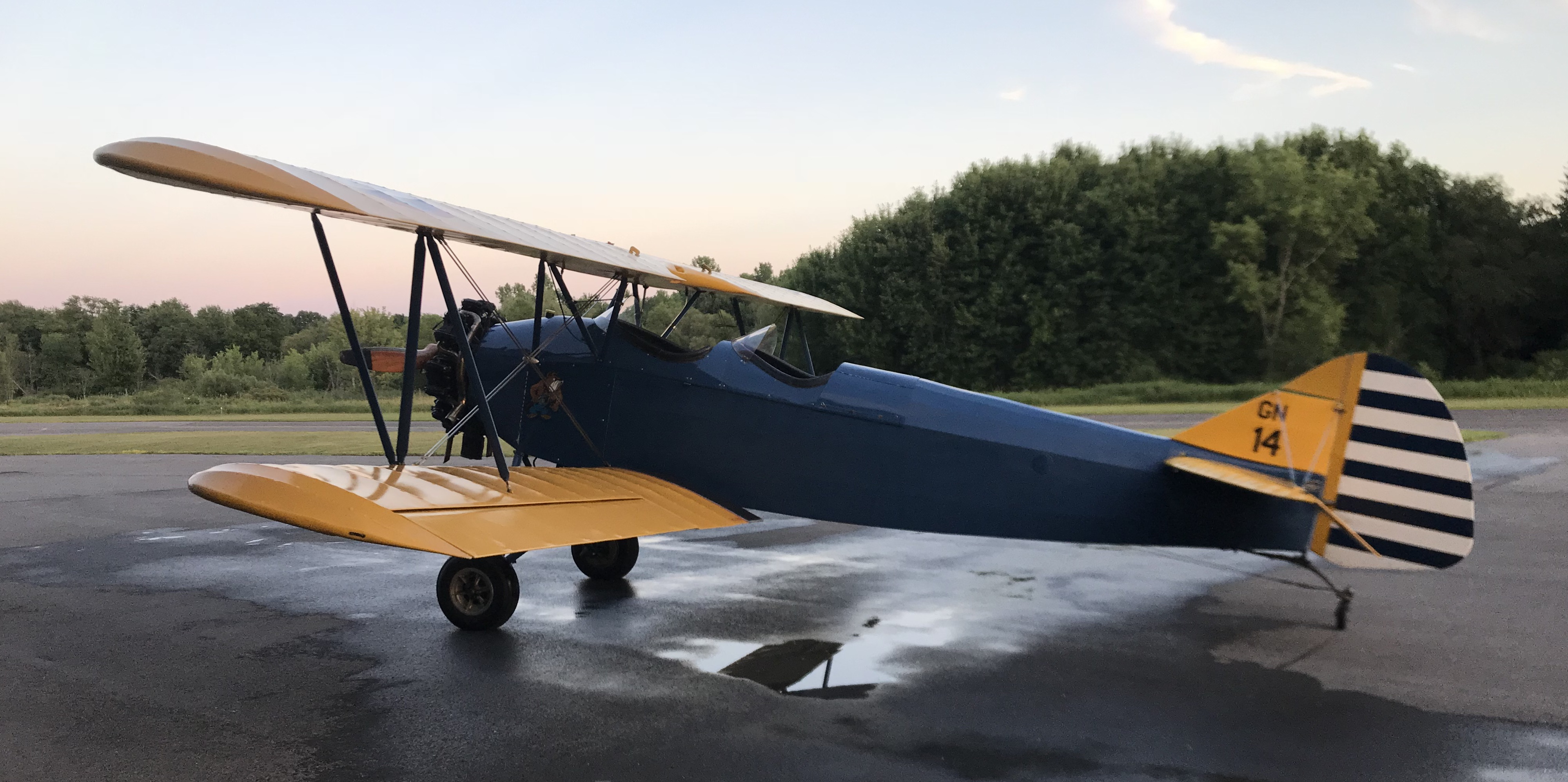
Fleet 10F in upstate New York. Formerly owned by the Nicaraguan Air Force.

Model 10G
Model powered by 90 hp (67 kW) Wright-Gypsy or 130 hp (97 kW) Gypsy Major inline engine, built under license in Romania at IAR, SET & ICAR factories, also used in Portugal.
Model 10H
Model 150 hp (110 kW) supercharged Menasco C-4S Inline
Model 16F
One prototype based on the Fleet Model 10; powered by a 175 hp (130 kW) Warner Super Scarab seven cylinder radial engine
Model 16R (Finch I)
27 built for RCAF; powered by 160 hp (120 kW) Kinner R5-2, five cylinder radial engine
Model 16B (Finch II)
404 built for the RCAF; powered by 130 hp (97 kW) (variously noted as 125 hp (93 kW)) Kinner B5-R, five cylinder radial engine
Model 16D
15 built for the Portuguese Navy; powered by 160 hp (120 kW) Kinner B5-2, five cylinder radial engine

== Operators ==
- Canada
  - Royal Canadian Air Force
- Portugal
  - Portuguese Navy
- Romania
  - Royal Romanian Air Force
- Republic of China (Taiwan)
  - Chinese Air Force

== Survivors ==
Model 16

- registration CF-AAE, serial 243, at the Reynolds-Alberta Museum in Wetaskiwin, Alberta and painted as 1001.

Model 16B

- registration N666J, serial 350, one of two Finches based at the Old Rhinebeck Aerodrome in New York State since at least 1970, with at least three different color schemes in its four decades-plus of flying in Old Rhinebeck's weekend airshows. Since suffering a crash landing in 2016, the aircraft is awaiting a rebuild.
- registration CF-GER, serial 399, at the Guelph Airport in Ontario and painted as 4488.
- registration unknown, serial 542, at the Canadian Museum of Flight in British Columbia and painted as 4725.
- registration ZK-AGC, serial 668, airworthy with a private owner at Omaka Aerodrome in New Zealand. For sale as of November 2020.

Model 16R

- registration C-FDAF, serial 92319, at the Guelph Airport in Ontario and painted as 4494.

== Aircraft on display ==
Model 16B

- registration C-GQWE, serial 567, at the RCAF No.6 Dunnville Museum in Ontario and painted as 4708.
- registration C-FFUI, serial 623, at the Canadian Warplane Heritage Museum in Ontario and painted as 4738.
- serial 408 registration CF-SUX, at the Canada Aviation and Space Museum in Ontario and painted as 4510.
- Model 10G No. 351 Built by ICAR - Întreprinderea de Construcţii Aeronautice Româneşti, at the Muzeului Militar Național „Regele Ferdinand I” in Bucharest, Romania and painted as 51.

== Specifications (Finch II) ==
Data from

General characteristics

- Crew: 2
- Length: 21 ft 8 in (6.60 m)
- Wingspan: 28 ft 0 in (8.53 m)
- Height: 7 ft 9 in (2.36 m)
- Wing area: 194.4 sq ft (18.06 m^{2})
- Empty weight: 1,222 lb (554 kg)
- Gross weight: 2,000 lb (907 kg)
- Powerplant: 1 × Kinner B-5 five-cylinder radial piston engine , 125 hp (93 kW)

Performance

- Maximum speed: 104 mph (167 km/h, 90 kn)
- Cruise speed: 85 mph (137 km/h, 74 kn)
- Range: 300 mi (480 km, 260 nmi)
- Service ceiling: 10,500 ft (3,200 m)
- Rate of climb: 435 ft/min (2.21 m/s)

== See also ==
Related development

- Fleet Model 1
- Fleet Fawn

Aircraft of comparable role, configuration, and era

- Avro Tutor
- Bücker Bü 131 Jungmann
- Curtiss-Wright CW-12 and 16
- de Havilland Tiger Moth
- Fokker S.IX
- New Standard D-29
- Polikarpov Po-2
- St. Louis YPT-15

Related lists

- List of interwar military aircraft
- List of British Commonwealth Air Training Plan facilities in Canada (specifies which BCATP schools used the Finch)
- List of aircraft of Canada's air forces
