= Magellan Aerospace =

Canadian aerospace manufacturer

Magellan Aerospace Corporation
- Type: Public
- Traded as: TSX: MAL
- Industry: Aerospace
- Founded: 1996; 30 years ago
- Headquarters: Mississauga, Ontario, Canada
- Key people: N. Murray Edwards (Chairman); Phillip Underwood (President & CEO)
- Revenue: 767.3 millions $ US
- Operating income: 79.41 millions $ US (2025)
- Net income: 35.5 millions $ US (2025)
- Number of employees: 3 723 employees (2025)
- Subsidiaries: Bristol Aerospace
- Website: magellan.aero

Magellan Aerospace Corporation is a Canadian manufacturer of aerospace systems and components. Magellan also repairs and overhauls, tests, and provides aftermarket support services for engines, and engine structural components. The company's business units are divided into the product areas of aeroengines, aerostructures, rockets and space, and specialty products. Its corporate offices in Mississauga, Ontario, Magellan operates in facilities throughout Canada, the United States, and the United Kingdom.

Magellan is a component supplier for the Airbus A380, the Boeing 787 Dreamliner, the F-35 Joint Strike Fighter, and Bombardier's complete line of business and commuter aircraft. Magellan also supplies gas turbine components for airplanes, helicopters, and military vehicles such as the M1 Abrams.

== History ==
Magellan was formed in 1996 from the remains of Fleet Industries, a subsidiary of the US-based Fleet Aerospace located in Fort Erie, Ontario. They produced products and services for the Canadian military, as well as subassemblies for aviation companies.

Through the 1990s, Magellan expanded, buying a number of Canadian aviation companies. These included:

- Orenda Aerospace (c. 1946 and now Magellan Aerospace, Mississauga) in Mississauga and acquired in 1997
- Bristol Aerospace (c. 1930) of Winnipeg and acquired in 1997 and now Magellan Aerospace, Winnipeg)
- Chicopee Manufacturing Limited (c. 1953) and now Magellan Aerospace, Kitchener in Kitchener, Ontario
- Haley Industries (c. 1952) of Haley Station, Ontario, and acquired 2002 and now Magellan Aerospace, Haley.

Several US companies were also added, including Aeronca Magellan Aerospace Middleton, (formerly part of the US-based portions of Fleet), AMBEL Precision Manufacturing, Ellanef Manufacturing, (Magellan Aerospace New York) Middleton Aerospace (Magellan Aerospace, Haverhill) and Presto Casting Company (Magellan Aerospace, Glendale). They also purchased the assets of Mayflower Aerospace in England, becoming Magellan Aerospace UK in 2003. The Fleet Aerospace division was closed in 2003, was sold, and later re-opened as Fleet Canada Inc. Magellan Aerospace is now an integrated, international company and all of its subsidiaries are wholly owned, operating under the Magellan name.

== Structure ==
- Magellan Aerospace Limited
  - Magellan Aerospace USA, Inc.
    - Magellan Aerospace New York, Inc.
    - Magellan Aerospace Middletown, Inc.
    - Magellan Aerospace Processing, New York
    - Magellan Aerospace Glendale, Inc.
    - Magellan Aerospace Haverhill, Inc.
- Magellan Aerospace (UK) Limited

== Projects ==
Magellan Aerospace also manufactures structures and assemblies for commercial and defence aircraft manufacturers:

- General Electric - F101, F110, F404, F414, J79, J85, CF34, CF700, CJ610, LM2500, LM7000, CFE738, T64, CF6
- Pratt & Whitney - PW100 Series, PW300 Series, PW500 Series, PW 200, PW4000, PT6, TF33, JT9D, JT15D
- Rolls-Royce - RTM322, RB211, T406, T800, RR Trent and RB211Industrial, AE 3007, F136
- Honeywell - AS900, AGT1500 (used in the M-1 Abrams tank), ALF507, TF40/50, T53 (used in the UH-1 helicopter), T55, LF502
- Volvo - RM12
- A380 Inner Fixed Trailing Edge
