= Fleet Aircraft =

Canadian manufacturer of aircraft

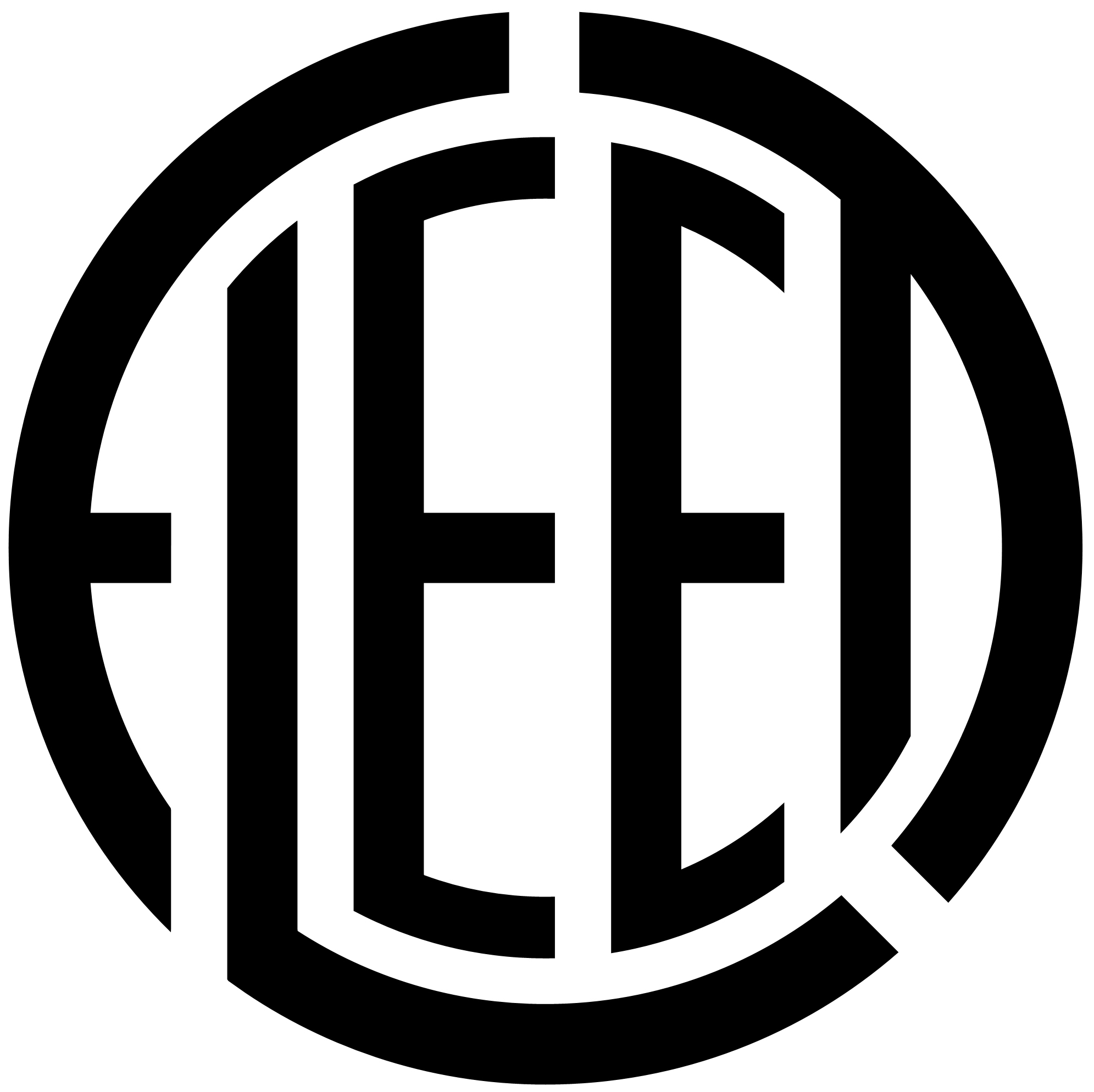
- Industry: Aerospace
- Founded: 1928
- Founders: Reuben H. Fleet
- Headquarters: Canada

Fleet Aircraft was a Canadian manufacturer of aircraft from 1928 to 1957.

In 1928, the board of Consolidated Aircraft decided to drop their light trainer aircraft and sold the rights to Brewster Aircraft. Reuben H. Fleet founded Fleet Aircraft in Fort Erie, Ontario, to acquire the foreign rights to these aircraft. Consolidated bought back Fleet Aircraft as a separate division in 1929 and formed Fleet Aircraft of Canada in 1930. The Fleet name was dropped for the Consolidated business name in 1939. Fleet Aircraft of Canada produced the Fleet Finch for the RCAF, and later the Fleet Canuck. Fleet developed a prototype light helicopter, which flew successfully, but was not put into production. Fleet ended aircraft manufacturing operations in 1957. The company was renamed Fleet Aerospace, and operated as a division of Magellan Aerospace.

The Fleet Aerospace division was closed in 2003, and later re-opened as Fleet Canada. The new company was not affiliated with Magellan Aerospace, and it has operated independently since.

== Aircraft ==
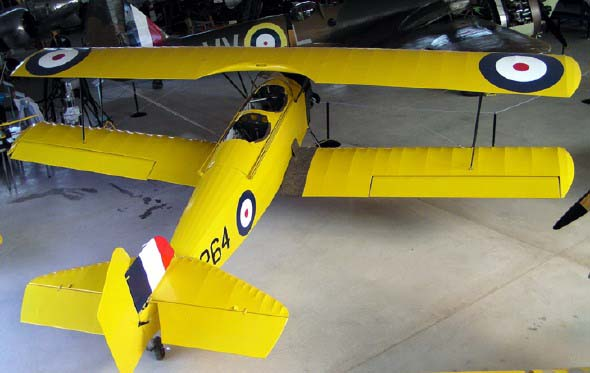
Fleet Fawn

Model	1st flight	No. built	Type
Fleet Model 1	1928	~90	Open cockpit two-seat primary trainer
Fleet Model 2		203	Open cockpit two-seat primary trainer
Fleet Model 3		1	Open cockpit two-seat primary trainer
Fleet Model 4		1	Open cockpit two-seat primary trainer
Fleet Model 5		1	Open cockpit two-seat primary trainer
Fleet Model 6		1	Open cockpit two-seat primary trainer
Fleet Model 7 Fawn		64-71	Open cockpit two-seat primary trainer
Fleet Model 10	1939		Open cockpit two-seat primary trainer
Fleet Model 11			Open cockpit two-seat primary trainer
Fleet Model 14			Open cockpit two-seat primary trainer
Fleet Model 16 Finch		447	Open cockpit two-seat primary trainer
Fleet Model 21		11	Basic export combat aircraft
Fleet Model 50 Freighter	1938	5	Cargo biplane for bush operations
Fleet Model 60 Fort	1940	101	Intermediate trainer/radio trainer
Fleet Model 80 Canuck		198-225	Light utility aircraft
Fleet Model 81		1	Light utility aircraft
Fleet D-10		1	License-built Doman LZ-5
Fleet Cornell	1942	1,642	License-built Fairchild Cornell
