= Fleet Model 1 =

Light biplane family

Model 1
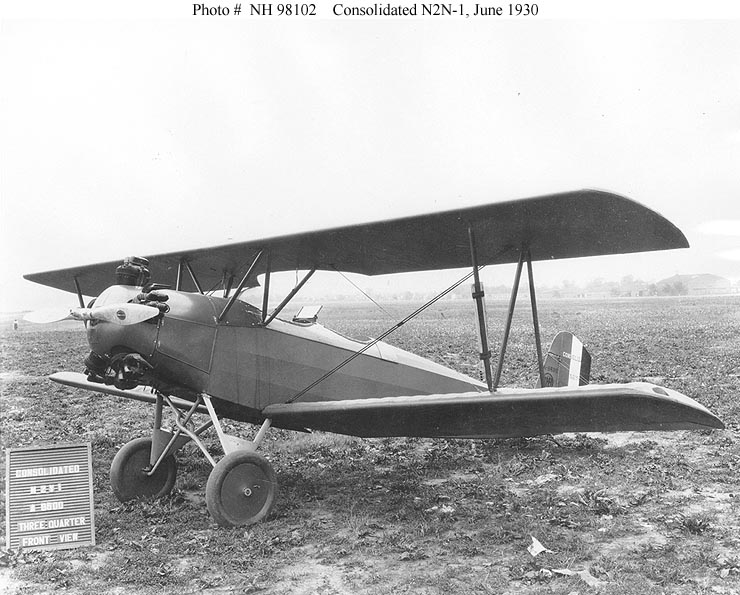
- U.S. Navy N2Y-1 with "looped" left mainwheel radius rod

General information
- Type: Recreational and training aircraft
- Manufacturer: Consolidated, Fleet
- Designer: Reuben Fleet

History
- First flight: 9 November 1928

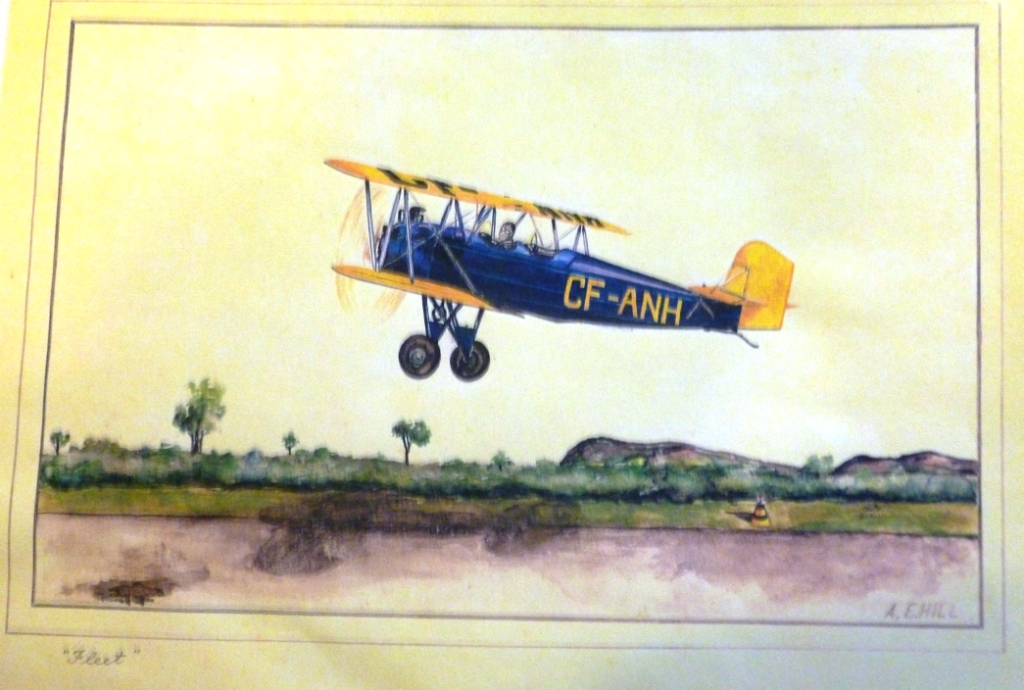
Fleet 2 aircraft sketched by A. E. (Ted) Hill. 1930s

The Fleet Model 1 (originally the Consolidated Model 14 Husky Junior) and its derivatives are a family of two-seat trainer and sports biplanes produced in the United States and Canada in the 1920s and 1930s. They all shared the same basic design and varied mainly in their powerplants.

== Development ==
The Fleet Model 1 and its derivatives were all orthodox biplanes with staggered, single-bay wings of equal span and fixed tailskid undercarriage. Accommodation was provided for two in tandem, originally sharing a single open cockpit, but in most examples in separate open cockpits. The fuselage was made of welded steel tube with triangular-layout Warren truss construction pattern side structures typical of the time, and the wings had a wooden spar with duralumin ribs, the entire aircraft being fabric-covered. Despite a superficial resemblance to Consolidated's highly successful Trusty and Husky designs (hence the "Husky Junior" nickname), the Model 14 was an all-new design.

Originally created as a means for Consolidated to enter the civil market, the company abandoned this ambition shortly before the completion of the first prototype. The manufacturing rights were purchased by designer and Consolidated company president Reuben Fleet to put into production under his new enterprise, Fleet Aircraft. It was an immediate success, and in the first year of production alone, over 300 machines were sold. Consolidated quickly responded by buying Fleet Aircraft and retaining it as a subsidiary while opening a second production line at Fort Erie, Ontario, Canada. The Canadian manufacturing was a great success, with some 600 examples built for the Royal Canadian Air Force as the Fleet Fawn (Model 7) and Fleet Finch (Model 16).

A small number of U.S.-built machines were purchased by the U.S. military, including a batch evaluated by the United States Army Air Corps as the PT-16 but not bought in quantity. One initial prototype aircraft and six subsequent specialized production N2Y trainers were purchased by the United States Navy. These N2Y-1 aircraft were equipped with hooks to catch the trapeze on two U.S. Navy airships, the USS Akron and the USS Macon. The N2Y-1 parasite aircraft were used to train pilots that would subsequently fly the longer distance single-seat F9C Sparrowhawks reconnaissance aircraft. The two-seater N2Y-1 also acted as service aircraft, flying passengers to the inroute airships.

On July 6, 1930, future air racer and movie stunt pilot Paul Mantz flew a Fleet Model 2 biplane through 46 consecutive outside loops, an international record which stood for almost 50 years.

United States manufacturing rights were eventually sold to Brewster Aeronautical Corporation, which intended to produce the Brewster B-1 based on the Canadian Model 16F.

== Variants ==
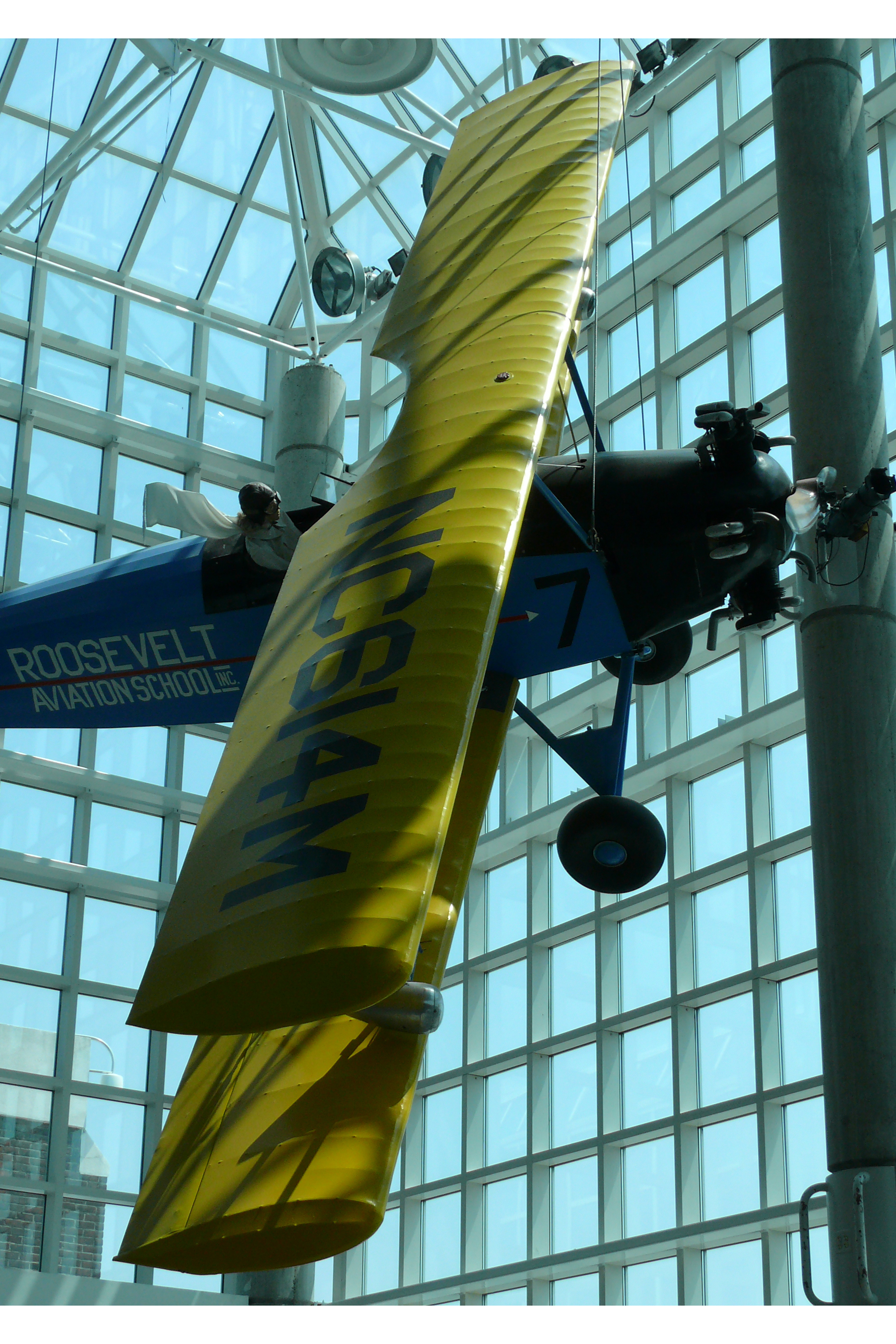
Fleet Model 2 on display in the Cradle of Aviation Museum.

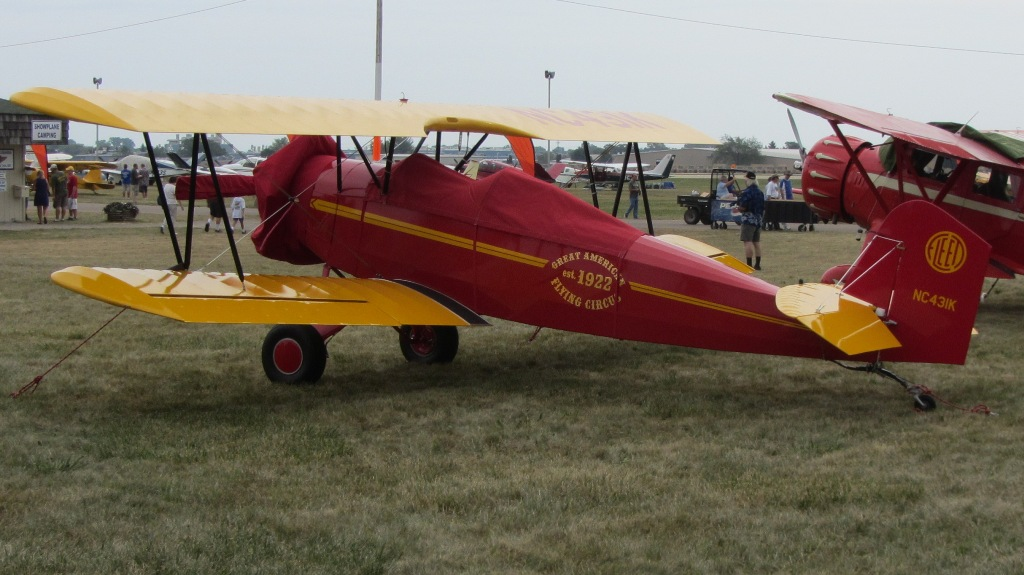
Fleet Model 2

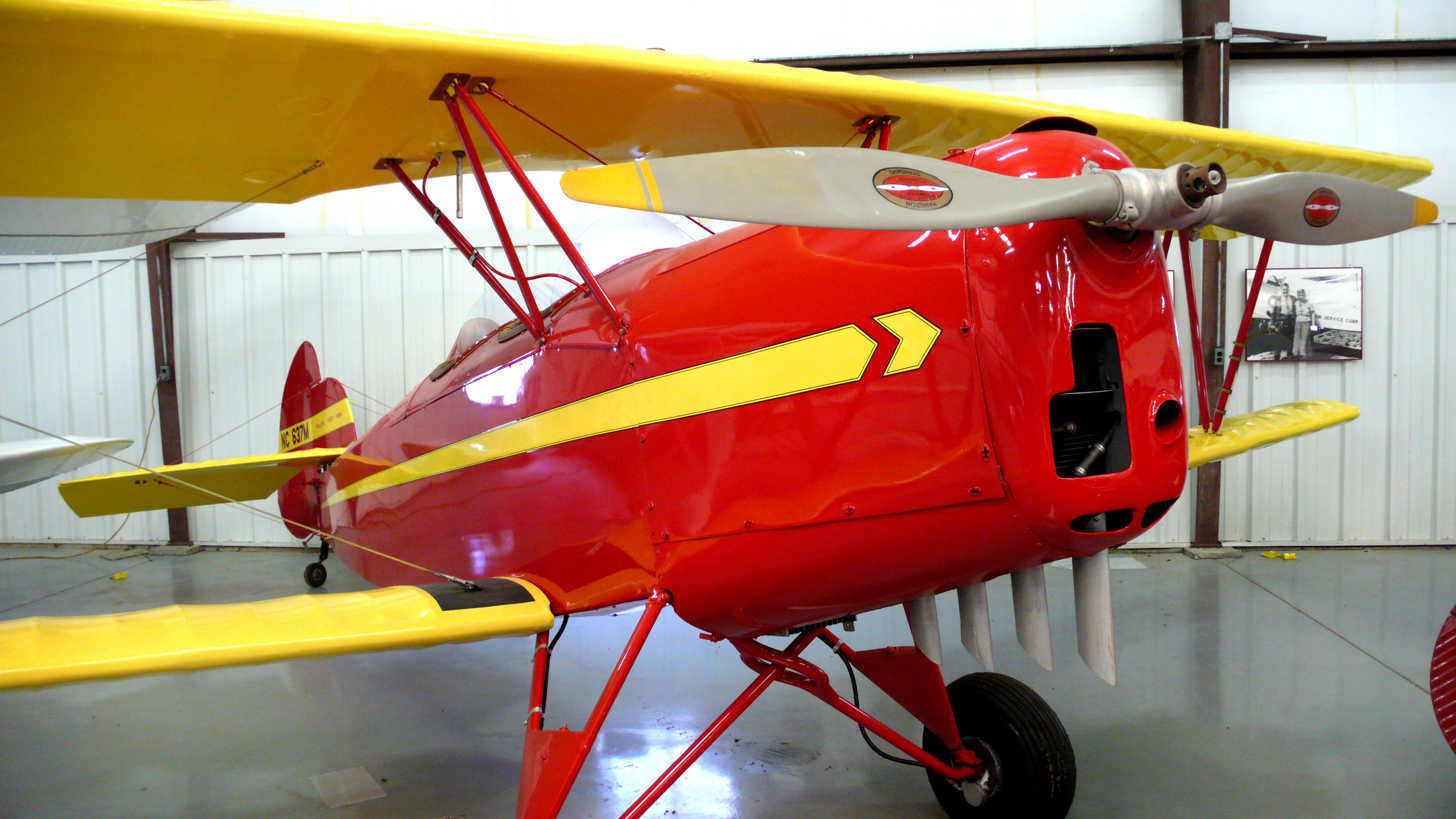
Fleet Model 7

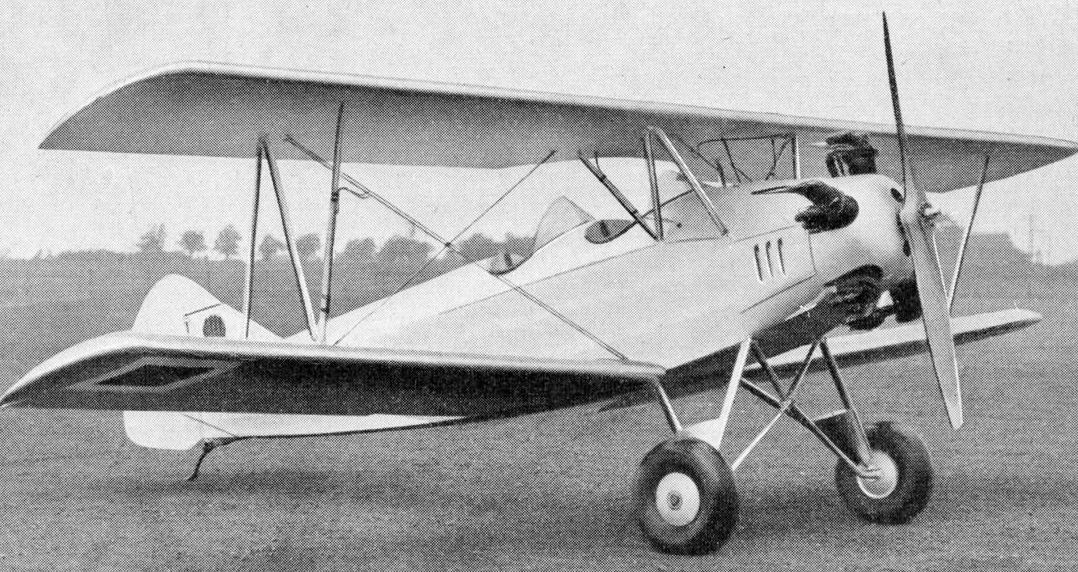
Fleet Model 11 photo from Le Pontentiel Aérien Mondial 1936

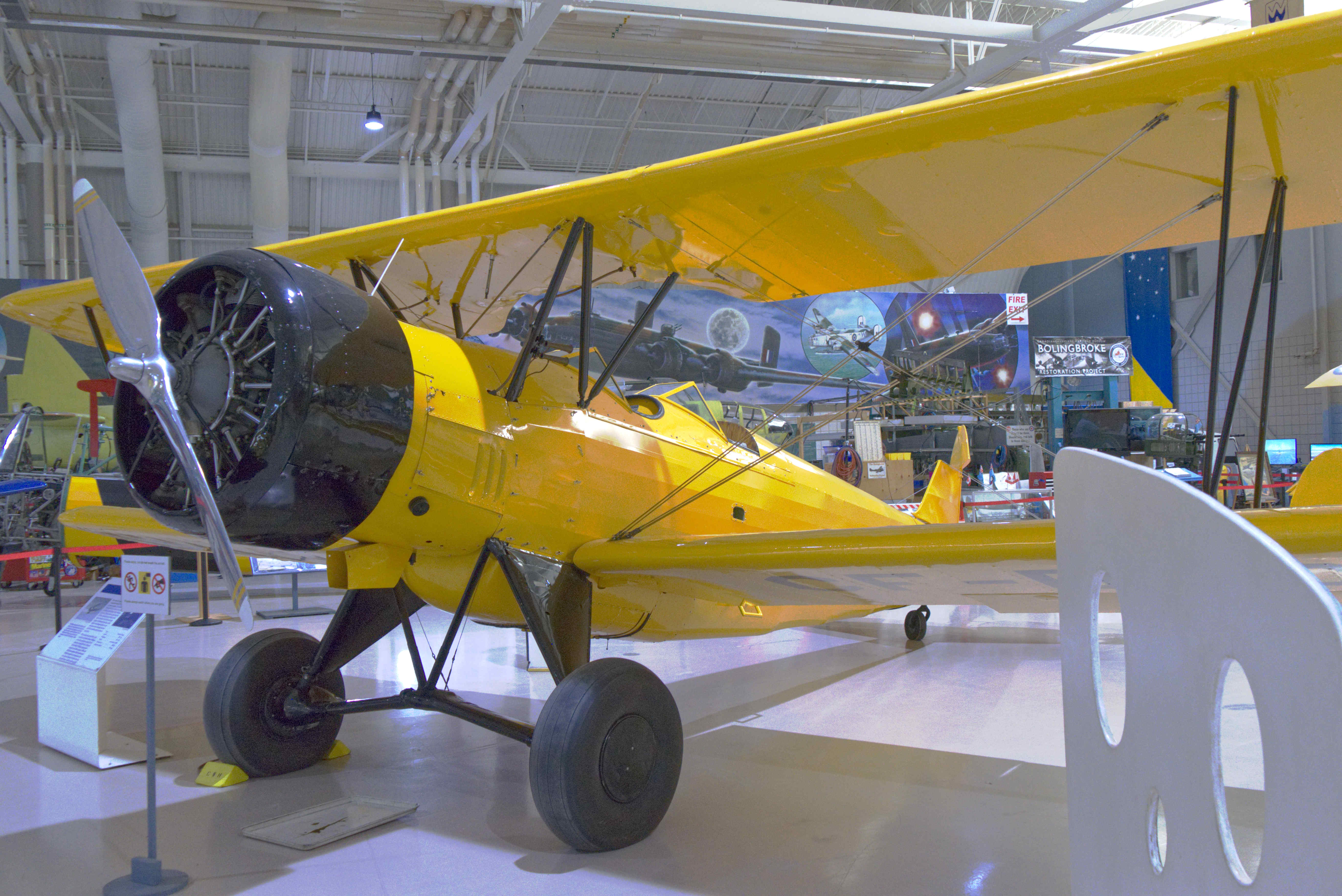
Fleet Model 21K, circa 1937

- Consolidated Model 14 Husky Junior - prototypes (ca. five built)
- Fleet Model 1 - initial production version with 110 hp (82 kW) Warner Scarab engine. Approximately 90 built, including one for US Navy for evaluation as XN2Y-1.
- Fleet 1 Special - One aircraft modified as testbed for 95 hp (71 kW) Menasco Pirate B-4.
- Fleet Model 2 - initial production version with Kinner K-5 engine. 203 built in US for civil market, with 13 built in US for Argentina and limited production in Canada.
  - PT-6 - USAAC designation for Model 2 (16 built)
  - N2Y-1 - USN version with trapeze hook for airship docking training (six built). One converted to floatplane as XN2Y-2 and then converted to autogyro as XOZ-1.
- Fleet Model 3 - based on Fleet 1 with 150 hp (110 kW) Wright J-6 engine. Two built.
- Fleet Model 4 - version with 170 hp (130 kW) Curtiss Challenger engine. One built.
- Fleet Model 5 - version with 90 hp (67 kW) Brownback C-400 engine. One built.
- Fleet Model 5 - Designation reused for Kinner K-5 powered version of Fleet 10. Six built in US for China. Built in Canada as Fleet 10A.
- Fleet Model 6 - Testbed for 165 hp (123 kW) Continental A-7 radial engine.
- Fleet Model 7 - version with Kinner B-5 engine (48 built, plus several converted from Model 2 by Fleet in Canada)
  - Fleet Model 7A
  - Fleet Model 7B - Canadian production version
  - Fleet Model 7C - Canadian production version with Armstrong Siddeley Civet engine
  - Fleet Model 7G - Canadian production version with de Havilland Gipsy III engine
  - XPT-6 - One Model 7 acquired by the US Army Air Corps for service tests. Version with 100-hp Kinner R-370-1 (Kinner K5) engine
  - YPT-6 - ten aircraft similar to the XPT-6, used by the US Army Air Corps for service tests and evaluation
  - YPT-6A - modified version of the Model 7 fitted with an enlarged cockpit. Used by the US Army Air Corps for service tests and evaluation
- Fleet Model 8 - three-seat version similar to Model 7 (seven built)
- Fleet Model 9 - refined version of Model 8 (12 built)
- Fleet Model 10 - refined version of Model 7 for export to Europe, replaced the 1928-origin "looped" portside main landing gear radius rod of the Models 2 & 7; with a center-hinged design for both mainwheels, using a V-form transverse cabane strut to provide the hinge-point. Rear fuselage decking also raised to fair in tailplane.
  - Fleet Model 10A - version with 100 hp (75 kW) Kinner engine
  - Fleet Model 10B - version with 125 hp (93 kW) Kinner engine
  - Fleet Model 10D - version with 160 hp (120 kW) Kinner engine
  - Fleet Model 10-32D - generally similar to the Model 10D, but with a 4 ft 0 in (1.22 m) longer wingspan
  - Fleet Model 10E - version with 125 hp (93 kW) Warner engine
  - Fleet Model 10F - version with 145 hp (108 kW) Warner engine
  - Fleet Model 10G - version with de Havilland Gypsy Major engine for governments of Portugal and Romania; 415 built in Romania: 40 by IAR, 80 by SET and 285 by ICAR.
  - Fleet Model 10H - version with Menasco C-4S engine
- Fleet Model 11 - version with Kinner R-5 engine; some exported to Argentina, China and Mexico
- Fleet Model 14 - Model 2 modified for participation in Guggenheim Safe Aircraft Competition but disqualified. Sometimes referred to as Model 2X.
- Fleet Model 16 - Fleet Finch - strengthened Canadian production version with sliding canopy, powered by a 130 hp (97 kW) de Havilland Gipsy Major engine (ca. 600 built)
  - Fleet Model 16B - Fleet Finch Mk II - Strengthened Canadian production version, powered by a Kinner B5 engine
  - Fleet Model 16D - similar to the Model 16B, but fitted with a Kinner B5 engine
  - Fleet Model 16F - prototype for Brewster B-1
  - Fleet Model 16R - Fleet Finch Mk I - designation of the Fleet 16D built in Canada for the RCAF
- Fleet Model 21 - armed version built in Canada for Mexican Air Force (11 built)
  - Fleet Model 21M - designation for a one-off demonstration aircraft
  - Fleet Model 21K - redesignation of the Model 21M, after it was subsequently sold to a private buyer
  - CATA 150 - Argentinian glider tug modification with 150 hp (110 kW) Lycoming O-320 engine. First example flew 5 June 1971. At least two converted.

== Operators ==
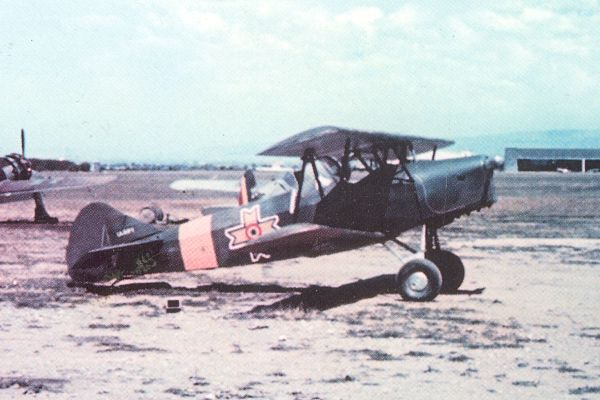
A Fleet Model 10G of the Royal Romanian Air Force

Argentina

- Argentine Naval Aviation - 10 Model 11 (1931 - 1940)

Canada

- Royal Canadian Air Force

China

- Chinese Nationalist Air Force - Fleet Model 11

Mexico

- Mexican Air Force

Romania

- Royal Romanian Air Force

Turkey

- Turkish Air Force

United States

- United States Army Air Corps
- United States Navy

Paraguay

- Paraguayan Air Force - Military Aviation School - 5 Fleet Model 2 bought in 1931

== Surviving aircraft ==
Argentina

- LV-ZCL – Model 16B on display at the Museo Nacional de Aeronáutica in Morón, Buenos Aires.

Israel

- 200 – Model 1 airworthy at Paradive Aviation Gallery at Habonim Airstrip. It is registered as 4X-AAF, was manufactured in 1929, and is powered with a Kinner B-5 radial engine.

Paraguay

- E-15 – Model 2 airworthy with the Yvytu Flight Club. A veteran of the Chaco War, it was donated Paraguayan Air Force in 1990. It was formerly registered as ZP-EAL.

Romania

- 351 – Model 10G on static display at the National Military Museum in Bucharest. Registered as 51, it was manufactured by Romanian company ICAR.

United States

- 181 – Model 2 on static display at the Pima Air & Space Museum in Tucson, Arizona. It is in the markings of Gilpen & Greenway Air Lines, Tucson, Arizona 1934.
- 229 – Model 2 airworthy at the Military Aviation Museum in Virginia Beach, Virginia. It is registered as NC636M and is in the markings of United Air Services of Burbank, California.
- 233 – Model 1 airworthy with David Trost of Westchester, New York.

== Specifications (Model 2) ==
Data from General Dynamics Aircraft and their Predecessors

General characteristics

- Crew: 2
- Length: 20 ft 9 in (6.32 m)
- Wingspan: 28 ft 0 in (8.53 m)
- Height: 7 ft 10 in (2.39 m)
- Wing area: 195 sq ft (18.1 m^{2})
- Empty weight: 1,063 lb (482 kg)
- Gross weight: 1,820 lb (826 kg)
- Fuel capacity: 55 US gal (46 imp gal; 210 L)
- Powerplant: 1 × Kinner K-5 5-cylinder radial engine, 110 hp (82 kW)

Performance

- Maximum speed: 113.5 mph (182.7 km/h, 98.6 kn)
- Cruise speed: 88 mph (142 km/h, 76 kn)
- Service ceiling: 12,200 ft (3,700 m)
- Rate of climb: 730 ft/min (3.7 m/s)
