= Bristol Aerospace =

Aerospace manufacturer

- Type: Subsidiary
- Industry: Aerospace
- Founded: 1930; 96 years ago
- Founder: Jim MacDonald; Grant MacDonald; Edwin MacDonald
- Headquarters: Winnipeg, Manitoba, Canada
- Products: Aircraft repair and overhaul, floats, rockets
- Number of employees: 630
- Parent: Magellan Aerospace
- Website: magellan.aero

Bristol Aerospace is a Canadian aerospace firm located in Winnipeg, Manitoba and is an operating division of Magellan Aerospace. Once part of the Bristol Aeroplane Company, today it is known as Magellan Aerospace, Winnipeg.

== History ==
Bristol Aerospace began in 1930 as the MacDonald Brothers Aircraft Company. Brothers Jim and Grant MacDonald moved to Winnipeg from Nova Scotia in 1904 to start a sheet metal business. Brother Edwin joined them later and by the late 1920s air travel had become an important means of transportation with Winnipeg becoming a hub for travel to the booming west. The MacDonalds formed MacDonald Brothers Aircraft Company in 1930, producing seaplane floats under licence from EDO Corporation of New York City. The company produced floats into the early 1980s.

=== WWII ===
During World War II the factory built training aircraft and by war's end had grown to 4,500 employees. At the end of the war, MacDonald Bros. became an important repair and overhaul centre for the Royal Canadian Air Force. Their location at the centre of the country lowered the average travel cost for aircraft to the factories, as well as providing aviation jobs in the Canadian west. Throughout the 1940s and 1950s the company performed depot level inspection and repair for many of Canada's fighter aircraft.

=== Purchase by the Bristol Aeroplane Company ===
In 1954, MacDonald Brothers Aircraft was purchased by the British Bristol Aeroplane Company, becoming their Canadian division. The company was an important supplier of accessories for jet engines, building the exhaust pipes for the Avro CF-100 Canuck and later becoming the primary maintenance depot for the aircraft. During the 1950s and 60s Bristol built on their experience in precision sheet metal work to become a major supplier of hot section components for various engine manufacturers.

=== CRV7 ===
In the second half of the 1950s Bristol was selected to build several test rocket airframes for CARDE's ongoing research into high-power solid fuel propellants. After initial research completed in the early 1960s, Bristol started selling a "lightened" version of the test vehicle as the Black Brant for sounding rocket use and opened the Rockwood Propellant Plant in 1962. The plant is located 25 minutes north of Winnipeg, in the community of Stony Mountain, Manitoba. As a result of this work, Bristol entered into a partnership with Aerojet General and became Bristol Aerojet the same year. This experience was later applied in the early 1970s to a new 2.75" (70 mm) motor for use in US-standard rocket launchers, leading to the CRV7, which has since become the standard NATO 2.75" rocket.

Since the incorporation of 'smart' weapons for the CF-18, Bristol no longer makes CRV-7 motors for the Canadian military. Production has dropped over the years although several smaller contracts to allied air forces have kept the plant active. A purchase by the Royal Air Force for rocket motors was completed recently along with the sale of 200 redundant launchers that were in long-term storage. As of January 2010, the company has lost contracts with several countries and militaries around the world, thus causing layoffs at the Rockwood plant.

=== CF-101 contract ===
In the early 1960s Bristol won the maintenance contract for the CF-100's replacement, the CF-101 Voodoo. This plane had been plagued with afterburner problems and Bristol started a research project to correct the issues. Their resulting proposal was accepted and both the Canadian and USAF F-101s were modified by Bristol, doubling the lifetime of the engines. Bristol retained the maintenance contract for the Canadian CF-101s until the last one was retired in 1987.

=== Bristol Aerospace ===
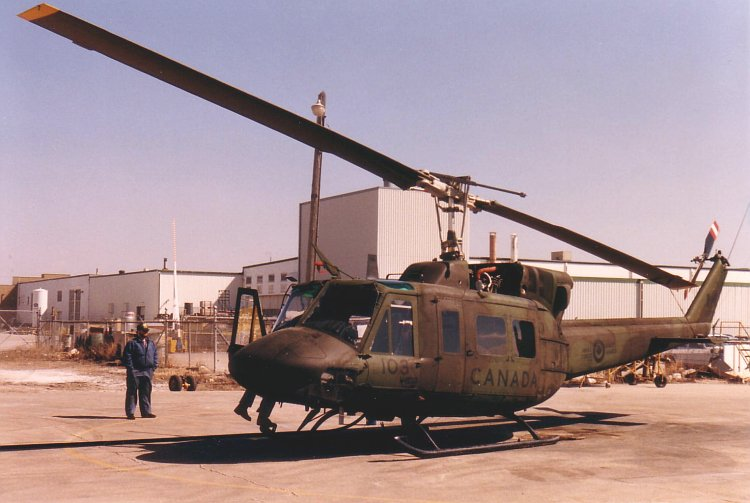
A Canadian Forces CH-135 Twin Huey after Depot Level Inspection and Repair undergoing testing flying at Bristol Aerospace in 1987

In 1967 the parent Bristol Aeroplane, whose UK aircraft construction division had been incorporated into the British Aircraft Corporation (BAC) in 1960, was purchased for its Bristol-Siddeley engine business by Rolls-Royce, and renamed Bristol Aerospace. It remained part of Rolls-Royce though nationalization and subsequent privatization again.

In the late 1960s, and the early 1970s under the joint U.S.-Canadian project known as the Meteorological Data Sounding System (MDSS) the company developed meteorological sounding rockets for the U.S. Army and other user agencies, such as U.S. Air Force, U.S. Navy, and National Aeronautics and Space Administration. The MDSS rockets were lighter, more reliable, and less expensive than those being in use by the Army.

During the 1970s the company continued to be involved in overhaul and maintenance work, and the CRV7 became a major product line.

The concept for the Wire Strike Protection System (WSPS) evolved from a tragic helicopter crash in Italy in April 1976 where 444 Squadron CH-136 Kiowa helicopters were conducting rescue missions following the earthquake in northern Italy. Maj Andre Seguin, then a flight commander with 444 Tactical Helicopter Squadron out of Lahr, West Germany conceived the wire protection system following a fatal wirestrike. The Unit CO tried to get formal recognition for Seguin for the concept during late 1976, but there was no meaningful support from the Canadian headquarters. Bristol shortly thereafter took the idea and developed it. They subsequently patented the WSPS for helicopters, which cuts cables on impact. These devices can be found on many helicopters today, in the form of angular "blades" projecting from the top and bottom of the cabin area.

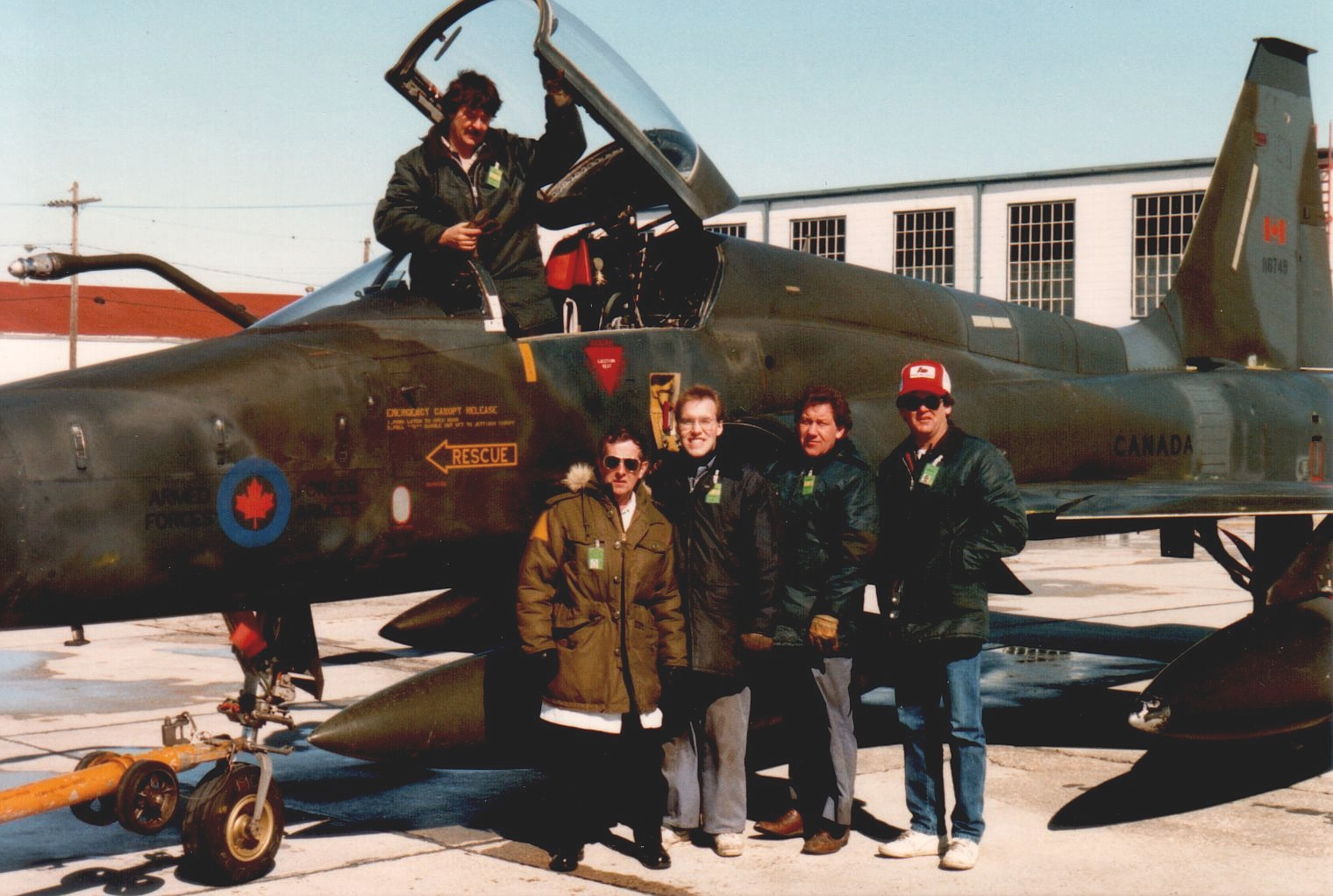
The first Canadian Forces Canadair CF-5 arrived at Bristol Aerospace on 1 April 1987 and was received by the company Flight Service crew.

In January 1987, Bristol was awarded the maintenance contract for the Canadian Forces Canadair CF-5 fleet, as a consolation contract for losing the more lucrative and longer-term CF-18 maintenance and overhaul contract to Canadair. The CF-5 effort lasted until 1995 when the federal government decided to remove them from service. Afterward Bristol was contracted to sell off the redundant aircraft to other interested air forces and offered to include a major upgrade to the avionics system. Bristol brokered a deal in 1996 for the purchase of ten single-seat and three dual-seat CF-5s by the Botswana Defence Force, but this was the only sale to be made. The company returned the two CF-5D demonstration aircraft to CFB Trenton (for storage) in March 2004, ending over 70 years of aircraft repair and overhaul. The company then refocused its energies on fabricating sub-assemblies and other components for the commercial aircraft business.

=== Environmental Concerns ===
Bristol Aerospace has multiple incidents of environmental damage consisting of water contamination due to illegal chemical dumping at their Rockwood MB (Manitoba) propellant plant and Winnipeg facilities. This contamination is from toxic and carcinogenic solvents, including trichloroethylene (TCE), propellants and other chemicals.

The Rockwood Manitoba propellant plant water contamination has resulted in a Manitoba designated TCE Groundwater Sensitive Area.

Other concerns include their long term use of open pit burnings. These impacts have not yet been studied in-depth.

James Wilt's article also states:

Magellan has described having implemented “remedial systems… to address trichloroethylene-impacted groundwater” at its operations in Mississauga, Fort Erie, and in the UK. The company has also reported that “neighbouring property owners to the Corporation’s sites at Winnipeg, Manitoba; Mississauga, Ontario; Fort Erie, Ontario and Queens, New York have been made aware of potential off-site impacts of trichloroethylene and environmental investigations at those sites,” but that “negotiations with the neighbouring property owners have precluded the need for off-site remediation.”

=== Purchase by Magellan Aerospace ===
In June 1997 Rolls-Royce plc sold Bristol for $62,500,000 to Magellan Aerospace, a corporation formed by the merger of a number of Canadian and US aerospace firms. Since then Magellan has accelerated its consolidation of the various divisions located in Canada, the United States and Britain under the Magellan 'brand' logo reducing the visibility and independence of Bristol Aerospace. Staffing at the Winnipeg plant is now under 600 people while the Rockwood facility in Stony Mountain is approximately 50 personnel.

In 1999 Bristol won the contract for SCISAT-1, the first purely Canadian science satellite since 1971. With its successful launch on 12 August 2003, the basic systems were selected by the Canadian Space Agency as a generic small-satellite "bus", with plans to launch more over the next decade.

Bristol has also worked in Canadian nuclear reactor construction. It has supplied core components, CANDU reactor tubes and thermal sleeves to AECL and GE.

== Products ==
The company designed and manufactures the Black Brant series of sounding and research rockets.

Magellan (Bristol) now produces aircraft sub-assemblies and engine components for all the major aerospace companies. Some examples include but are not limited to:

1. Boeing 767 heat pan, Boeing 737 composite panels and Boeing 747 wing to Body Fairings
2. General Electric F101 engine thruster door
3. Airbus A330 & Airbus A380 aft engine plugs
4. De Havilland Canada DASH 8 engine nacelles, fairings, etc.
5. DHC Dash 8 Tailcone & APU Support
6. Pratt & Whitney Canada JT15D, PW545, PW307, PW306 engine components
7. M1 Abrams AGT1500 tank engine housing
8. AgustaWestland EH101 lower fuselage and composite engine & transmission cowlings
9. F-35 Lightning II JSF Vertical Guide box for Rolls-Royce Lift Fan module and composite panels for fuselage.

== Aircraft ==
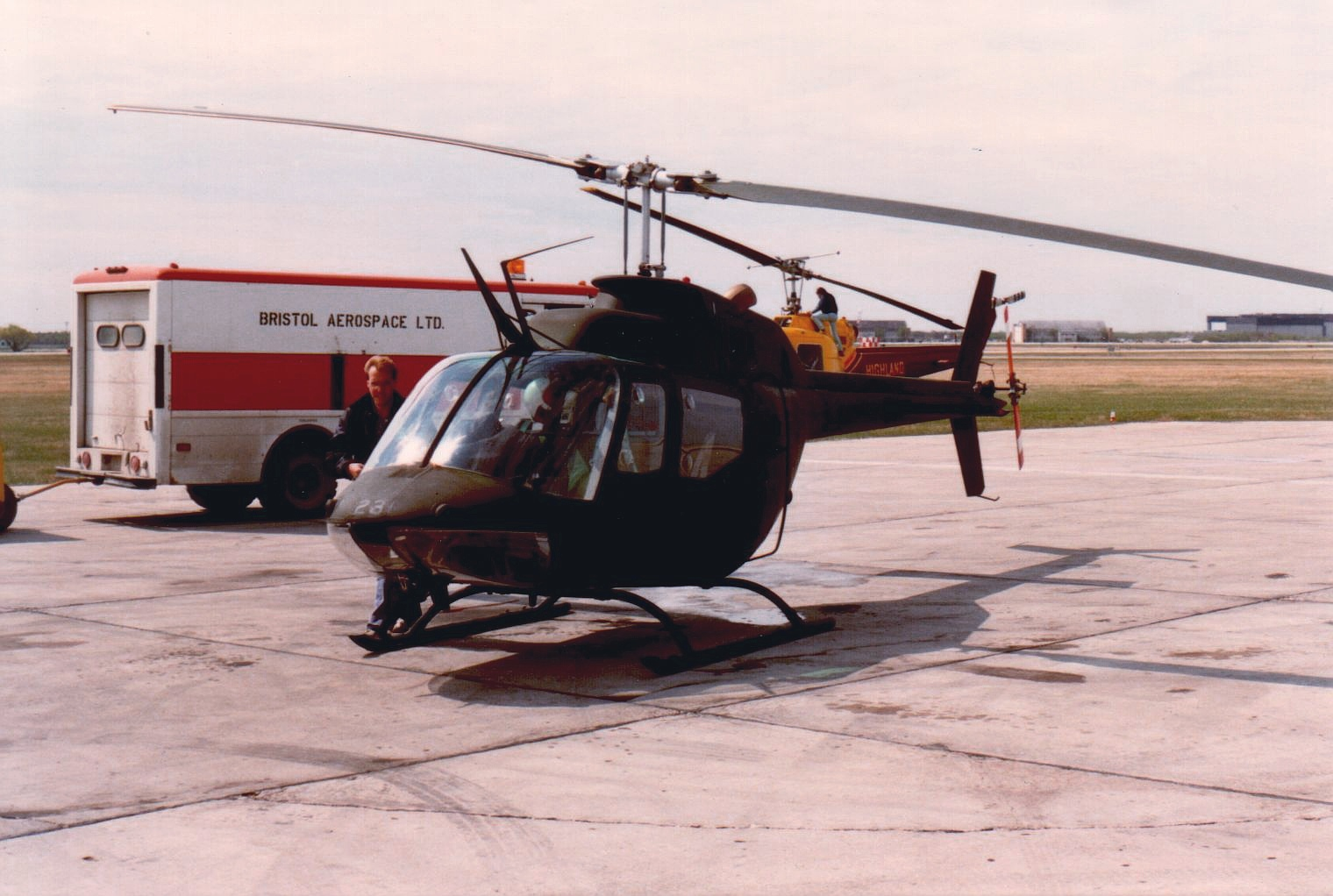
A Canadian Forces Bell CH-136 Kiowa after Depot Level Inspection and Repair undergoing testing flying at Bristol Aerospace. This was the last Kiowa to go through DLIR and was test flown in April 1987.

Aircraft Repair and Overhaul
| Aircraft | Type | Start date | End date |
|---|---|---|---|
| Canadair CF5A & D | fighter | 1987 | 1995 |
| McDonnell CF-101 Voodoo | fighter | 1964 | 1987 |
| Bell CH-118 | helicopter | 1982 | 1985 |
| Bell CH-136 Kiowa | helicopter | 1982 | 1987 |
| Bell CH-135 Twin Huey | helicopter | 1987 | 1991 |

== Spacecraft ==
- Black Brant sounding rocket
- SCISAT-1
