= Fleet 80 Canuck =

1940s trainer by Fleet Aircraft

Model 80 Canuck
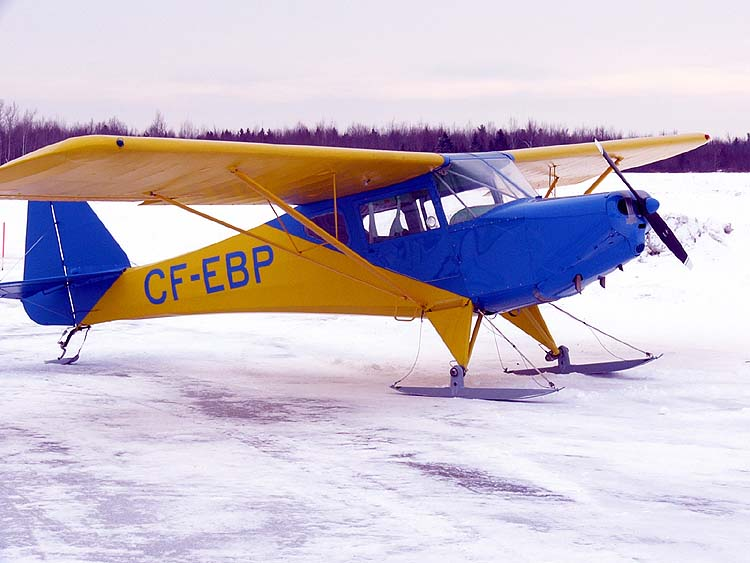
- Fleet Canuck on straight skis

General information
- Type: Trainer
- Manufacturer: Fleet Aircraft of Canada
- Designer: J. Omer (Bob) Noury
- Status: Production completed in 1958
- Number built: 225 (including one prototype)

History
- Introduction date: 1946
- First flight: 26 September 1945, Noury N-75 prototype flew in 1944

The Fleet Model 80 Canuck is a Canadian light aircraft featuring two seats in side-by-side configuration. The Canuck was designed for the flight training, personal use and light commercial roles. A total of 225 Canucks were built by two manufacturers during its thirteen-year production run, with the majority being built by Fleet Aircraft between 1945 and 1947.

== Design and development ==
The Canuck originated with the Noury N-75, designed by Bob Noury which first flew in 1944 at Mount Hope, Ontario. The "home-built" N-75 was a conventional high-wing monoplane design with a welded-steel fuselage and tail surfaces with fabric covering, looking not unlike a Piper Cub. However, the side-by-side seating in the original design was unusual for aircraft of its time even though it was a far better arrangement for instruction. Noury also experimented with a tandem-seat arrangement on a following prototype but had only built three aircraft when he sold the Noury N-75 rights to the Fleet Aircraft Company in 1945.

Fleet undertook some minor design changes, principally relocating the fuel tank, adding a skylight above the cabin, lowering the front fuselage profile and replacing the original Continental C-75 with a slightly more powerful C-85 engine. The Noury N-75 was tested in its new configuration; it first flew on 26 September 1945 with Fleet Test Pilot Tommy Williams at the controls. Following modifications to the fin to increase its size, the prototype, newly renamed, emerged as the Fleet Model 80 Canuck, and entered production.

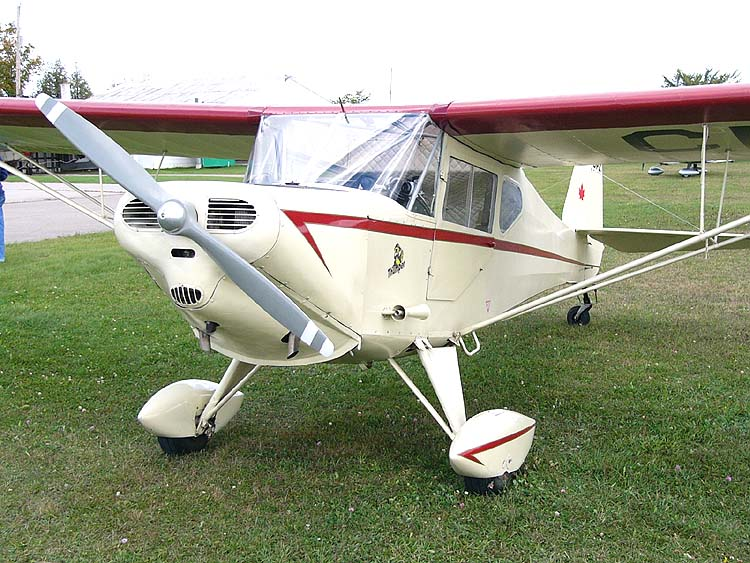
Fleet Canuck on wheels with wheel pants fitted

== Operational history ==
Although the aircraft were well built, strong performers and versatile; able to be flown with floats or skis to increase its utility, after a spurt in sales, they did not sell well. In trying to market the Fleet Canuck in the immediate postwar period, as either a private aircraft or a trainer, there were several obstacles:

- Surplus ex-military aircraft were cheaply available in large numbers
- Ex-servicemen and civilians were more interested in careers and families than luxury items
- Training aircraft were not in demand since thousands of ex-military pilots were out of work.

After initial sales to flying clubs, charter companies and private owners began to falter, Fleet ran into financial problems. In 1947, Canuck production by Fleet was terminated. Over the next ten years a number of aircraft were built up from components by Leavens Brothers in Toronto with total series production finishing at 224 in 1958. Several have been re-engined with the 100 hp (75 kW) Continental O-200.

In September 2010, there were 77 Canucks registered in Canada with Transport Canada. By April 2023, there were 70 Canucks left on the Canadian registry.

== Variants ==
- Fleet 80 Canuck : Two-seat sports and light touring aircraft.
- Fleet 81 : Three-seat light touring aircraft. One built.

== Aircraft on display ==
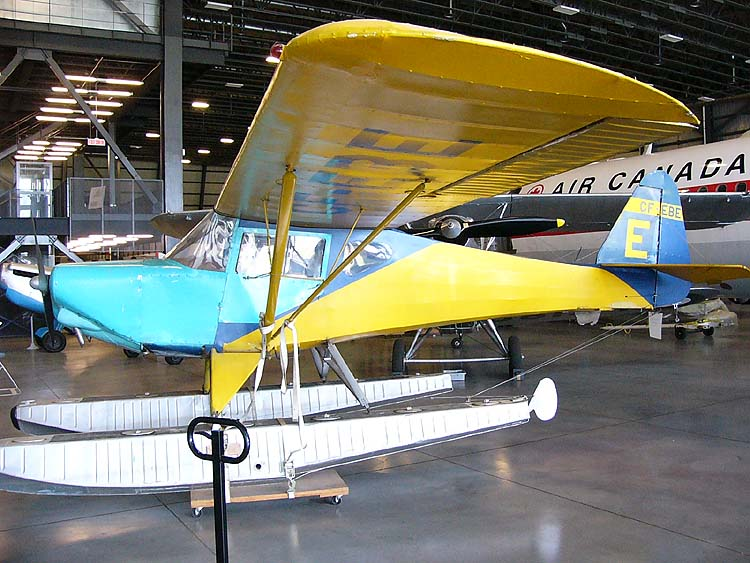
Fleet Canuck CF-EBE on straight floats. This aircraft, serial number 149, is in the storage facility of the Canada Aviation and Space Museum at Rockcliffe Airport.

In 1995, the Royal Canadian Mint issued Coin #11, a $20 silver commemorative coin in its aviation series, recognizing the Fleet 80 Canuck and its original designer, J. Omer Noury, featured in a gold-inlay cameo insert.

- Canada Aviation and Space Museum, Ottawa, Ontario - CF-EBE, serial number 149, is in the storage building, displayed on floats.
- Canadian Air and Space Museum, Toronto, Ontario - C-FEAI serial number 127.
- Canadian Aviation Heritage Centre, Montreal, Quebec - CF-ENH with marking of aircraft piloted by Hubert M.Pasmore .
- Reynolds-Alberta Museum, Wetaskiwin, Alberta - CF-BYW-X, the original Noury prototype, is in the storage building.

== Specifications ==
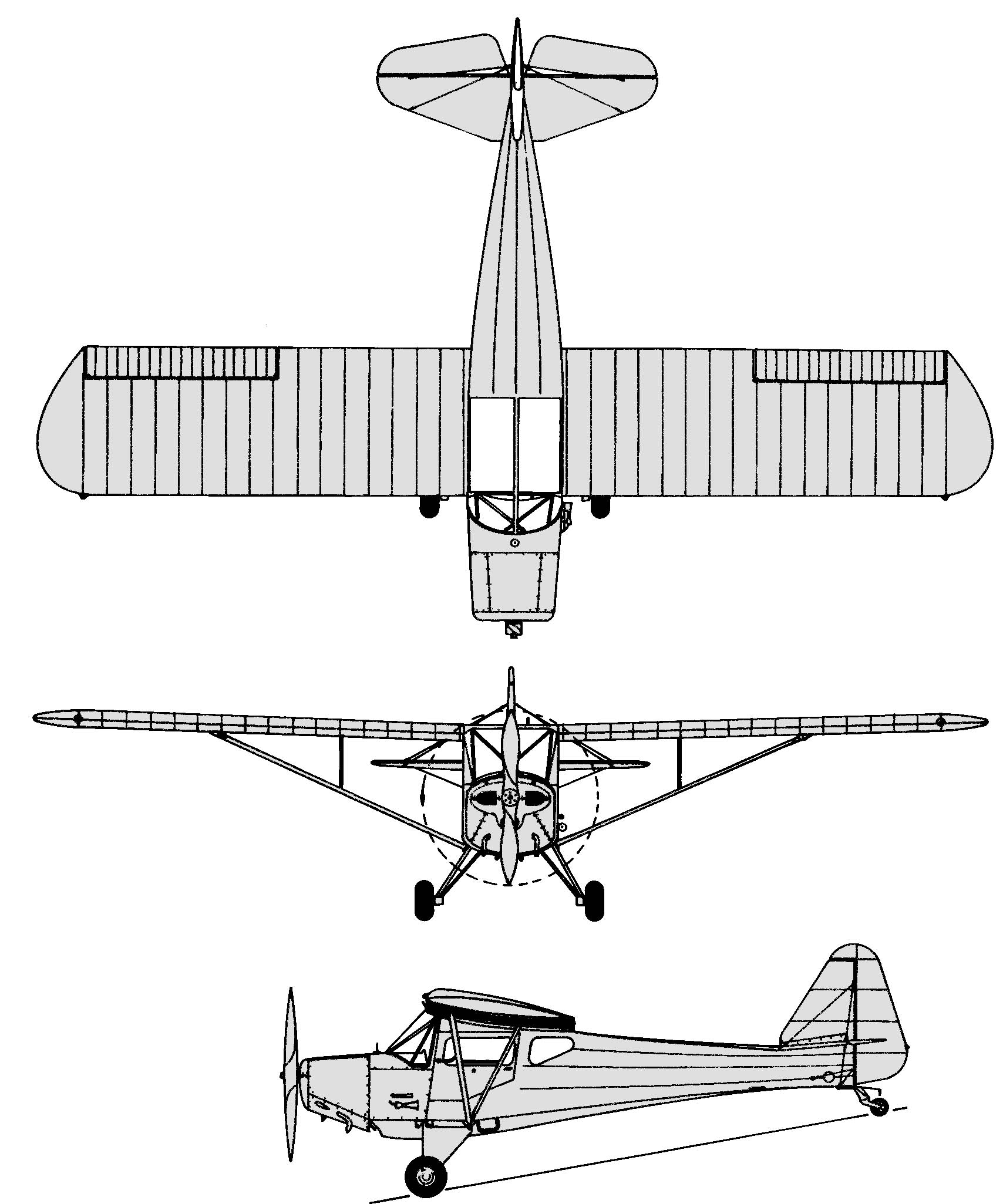

Data from Canada Aviation and Space Museum & Canadian Air & Space Museum

General characteristics

- Crew: one
- Capacity: one passenger
- Length: 22 ft 4 in (6.81 m)
- Wingspan: 34 ft 0 in (10.36 m)
- Height: 7 ft 1 in (2.16 m)
- Wing area: 173.5 sq ft (16.12 m^{2})
- Empty weight: 858 lb (389 kg)
- Gross weight: 1,480 lb (671 kg)
- Powerplant: 1 × Continental C-85-12J four cylinder horizontally-opposed aircraft engine, 85 hp (63 kW)
- Propellers: 2-bladed wooden

Performance

- Maximum speed: 111 mph (179 km/h, 96 kn)
- Cruise speed: 100 mph (160 km/h, 87 kn)
- Stall speed: 44 mph (71 km/h, 38 kn)
- Range: 300 mi (480 km, 260 nmi)
- Service ceiling: 12,000 ft (3,700 m)
- Rate of climb: 550 ft/min (2.8 m/s)

== See also ==
- 1944 in aviation (first flight)

Aircraft of comparable role, configuration, and era

- Aeronca 11 Chief
- Cessna 120/140
- Luscombe 8
- Piper PA-15 Vagabond
- Taylorcraft B-series
