= Guelph Airpark =

Guelph AirPark
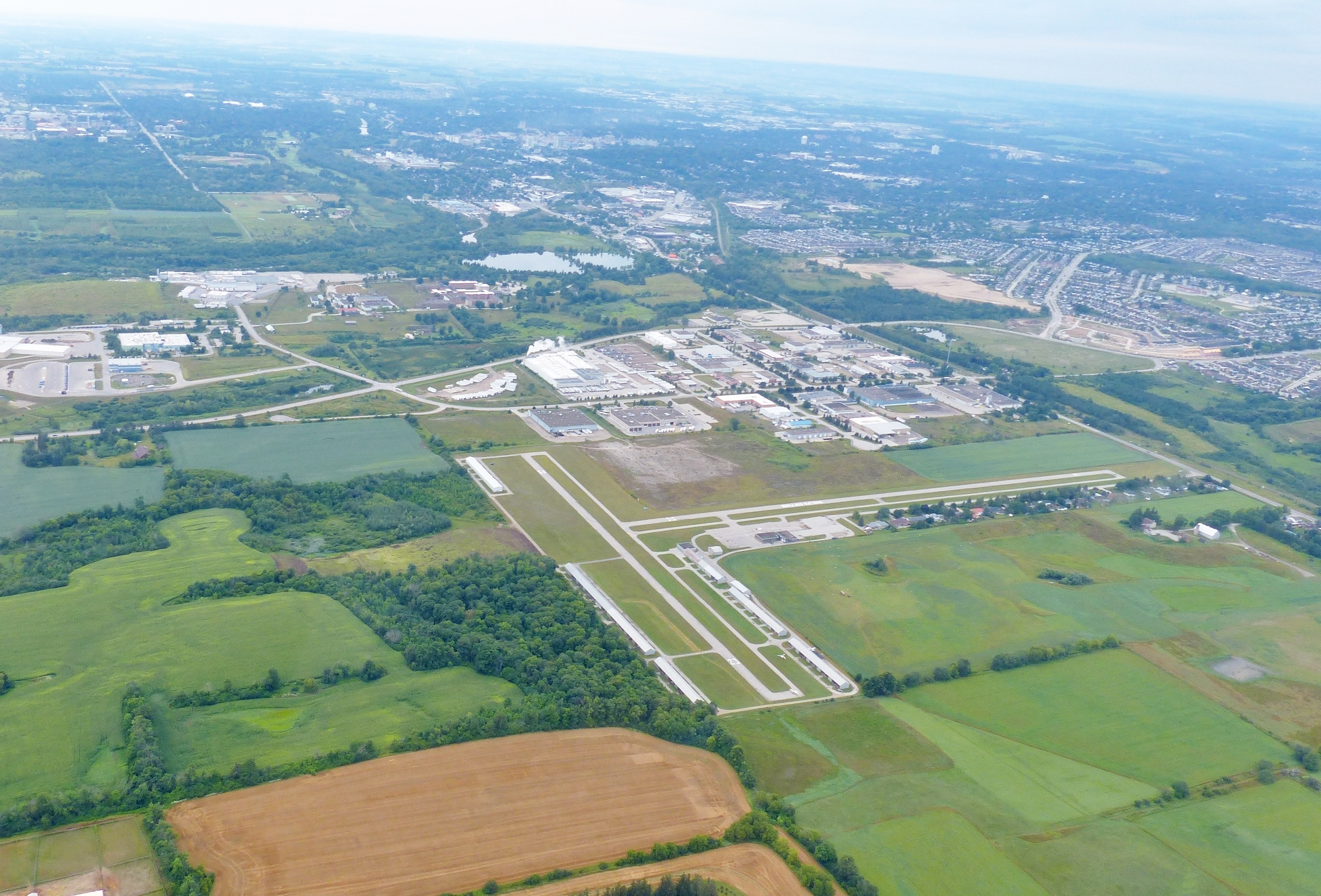
- Guelph Airport looking west towards the city
- IATA: none; ICAO: none; TC LID: CNC4

Summary
- Airport type: Public
- Operator: Inglis Berry
- Location: Guelph, Ontario
- Time zone: EST (UTC−05:00)
  - Summer (DST): EDT (UTC−04:00)
- Elevation AMSL: 1,100 ft / 335 m
- Coordinates: 43°33′49″N 080°11′45″W

Map
- Location in Ontario CNC4 (Canada)

Runways
Direction	Length		Surface
Direction	ft	m	Surface
06/24	2,006	611	Asphalt
14/32	2,562	781	Turf/asphalt

Statistics (2010)
- Aircraft movements: 24,586
- Source: Canada Flight Supplement; Movements from Statistics Canada

Guelph AirPark also known as Guelph Airport or Guelph Airfield (TC LID: CNC4) is located in the southeastern part of Guelph/Eramosa at its border with Guelph in Ontario, Canada. It consists of two runways, 14/32 and 06/24. Although known to residents as the "Guelph Airport" or "Guelph AirPark", it is actually an aerodrome, being registered, and not certified, by Transport Canada.

The airport is classified as an airport of entry by Nav Canada and is staffed by the Canada Border Services Agency (CBSA) on a call-out basis from the Region of Waterloo International Airport on weekdays and the John C. Munro Hamilton International Airport on weekends. At this airport the CBSA handles general aviation aircraft only, with no more than 15 passengers.

Founded in 1954 by aviation enthusiast Len Ariss, the aerodrome remained in the Ariss family until August 2011 when it was sold to Inglis Berry.

== Guelph AirPark in 2016 ==
The airfield has one major tenant, the Tiger Boys Aircraft Works, and numerous private owners. Fern Villeneuve kept his aircraft there.

Guelph AirPark is a transfer point for the Government of Ontario's air ambulance service - Ornge. ORNGE helicopters land on the ramp near the terminal building and transfer patients to and from land ambulances. Antique aircraft often use the grass between runway 05/23 and the east–west taxiway for landings and takeoffs. Occasionally gliders on cross-country flights land at Guelph if they run out of lift.

Runway 14/32 has lighting. There is a weather station about 2 km (1.2 mi) west of the airfield on the grounds of the University of Guelph's Turf Grass Institute. In 2016 Environment and Climate Change Canada reports some observations from this station.

In the spring of 2016 eight new hangars were under construction.

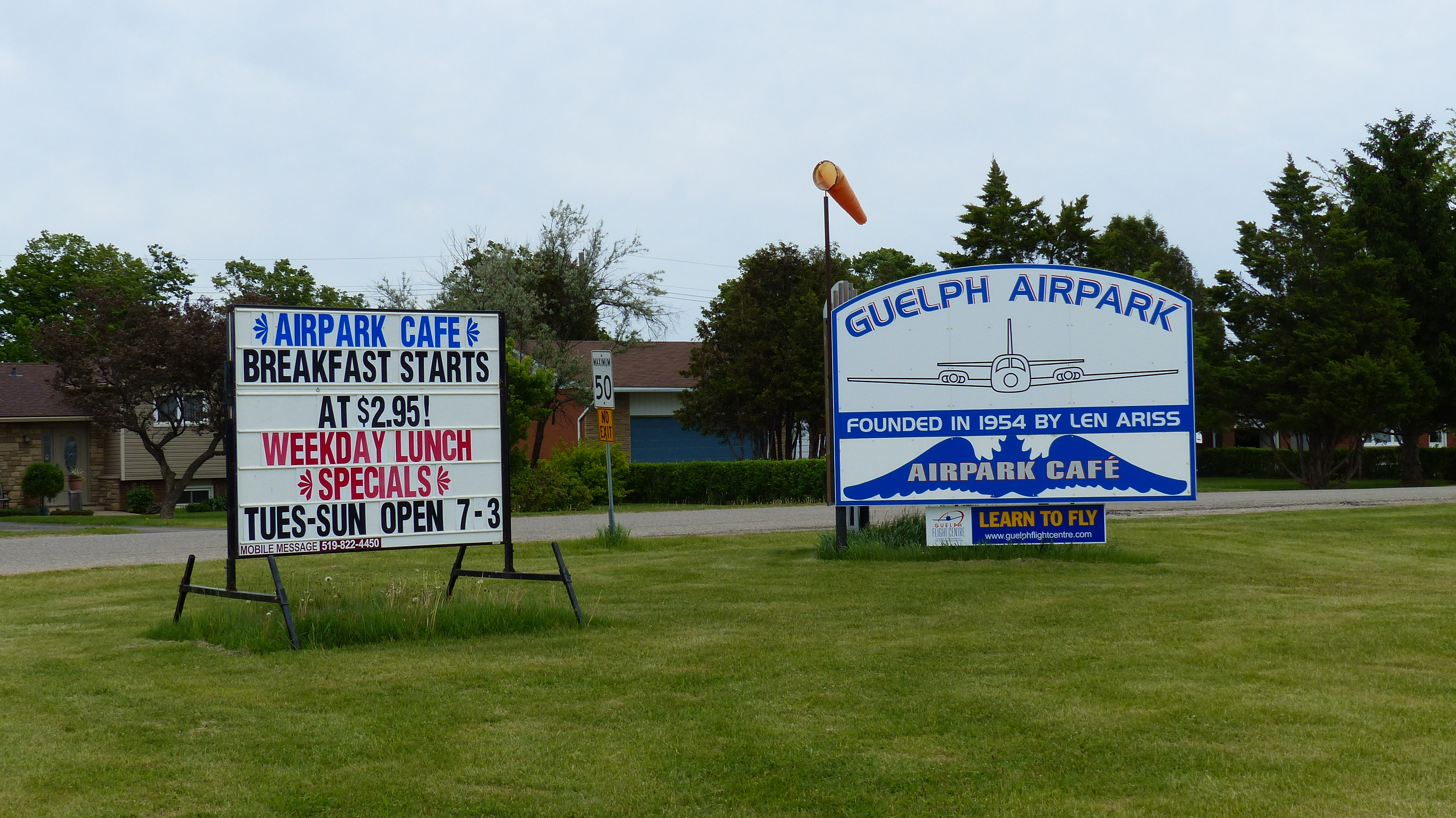
Highway signage

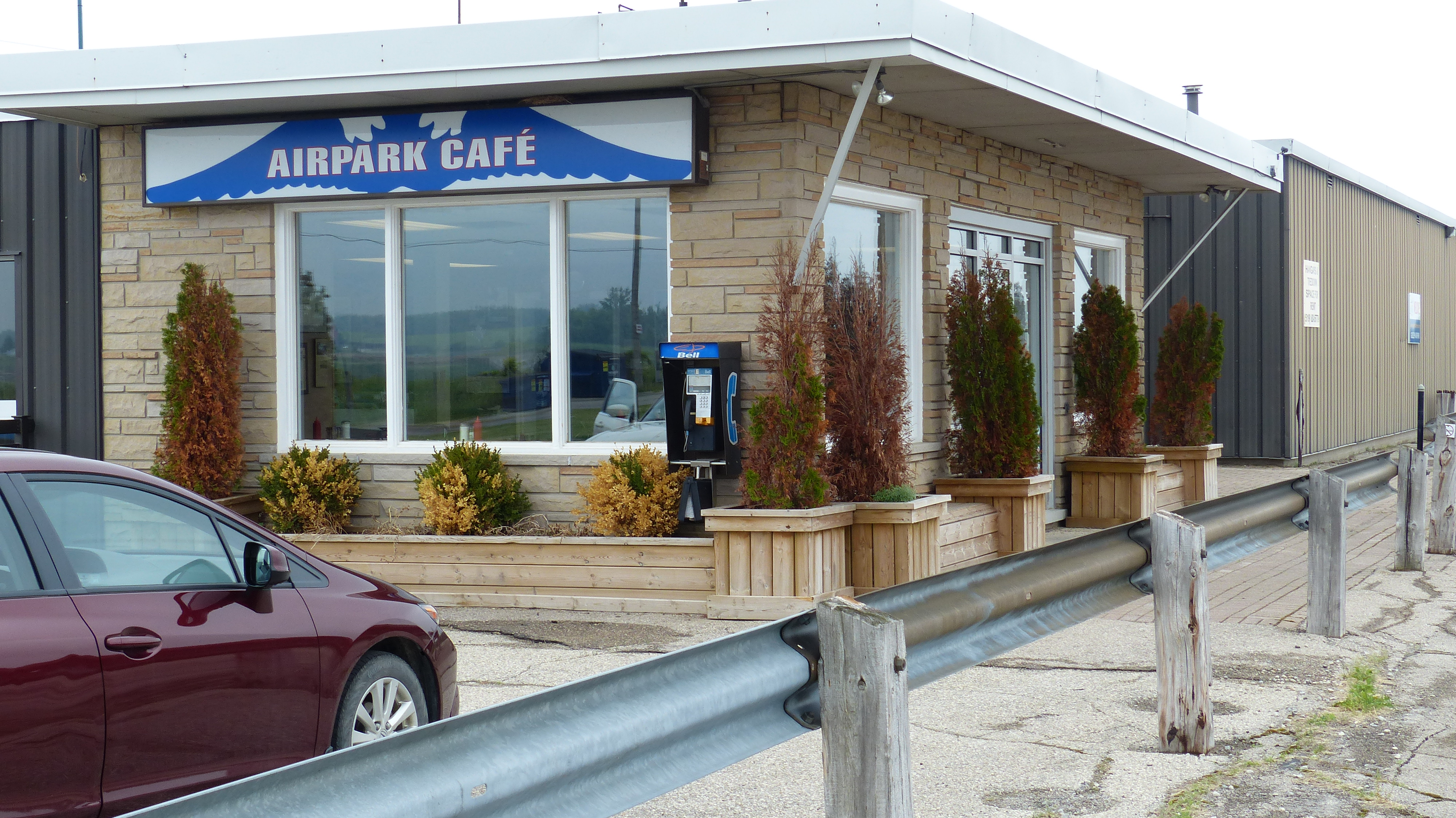
Cafe

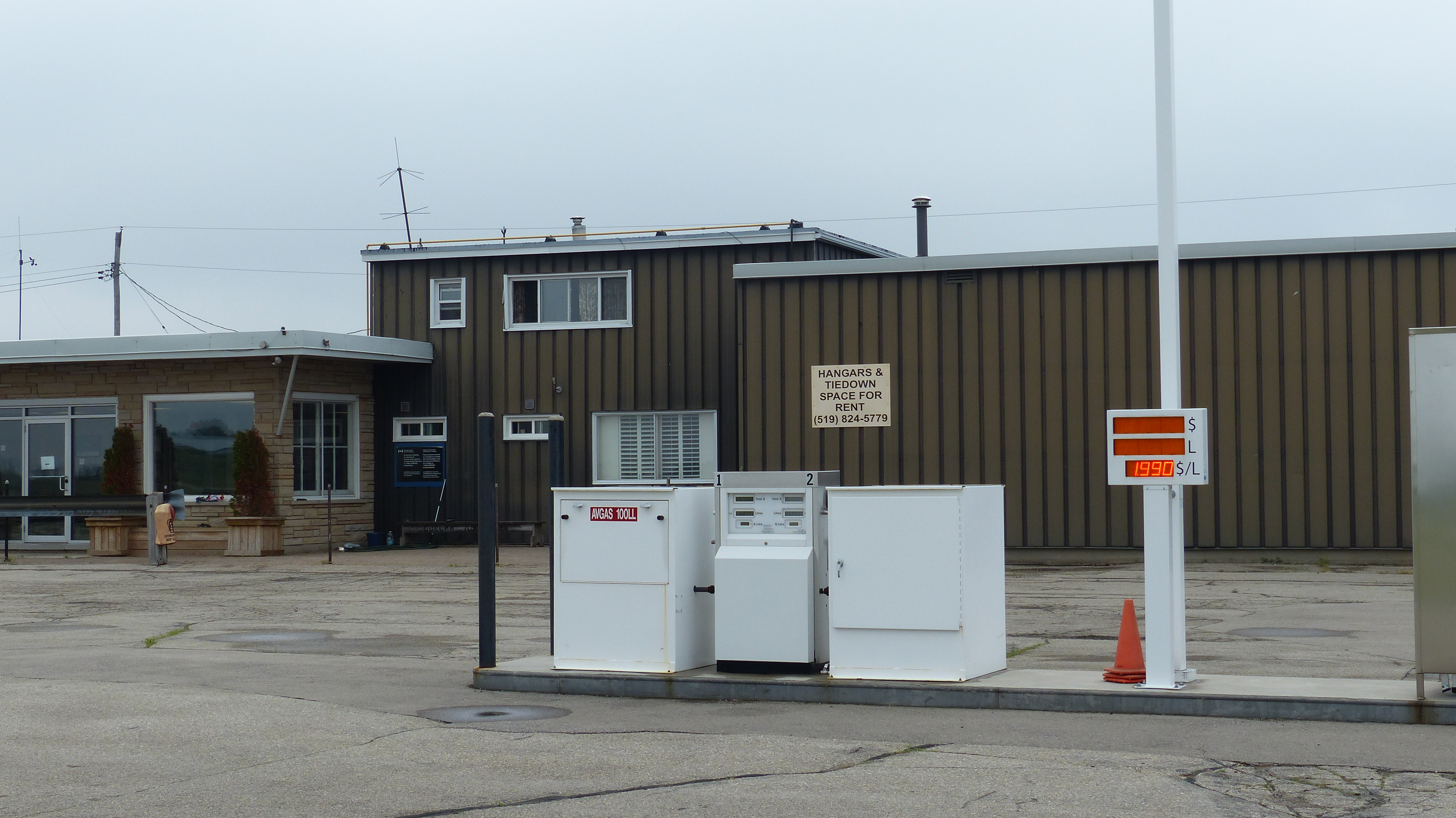
Main terminal

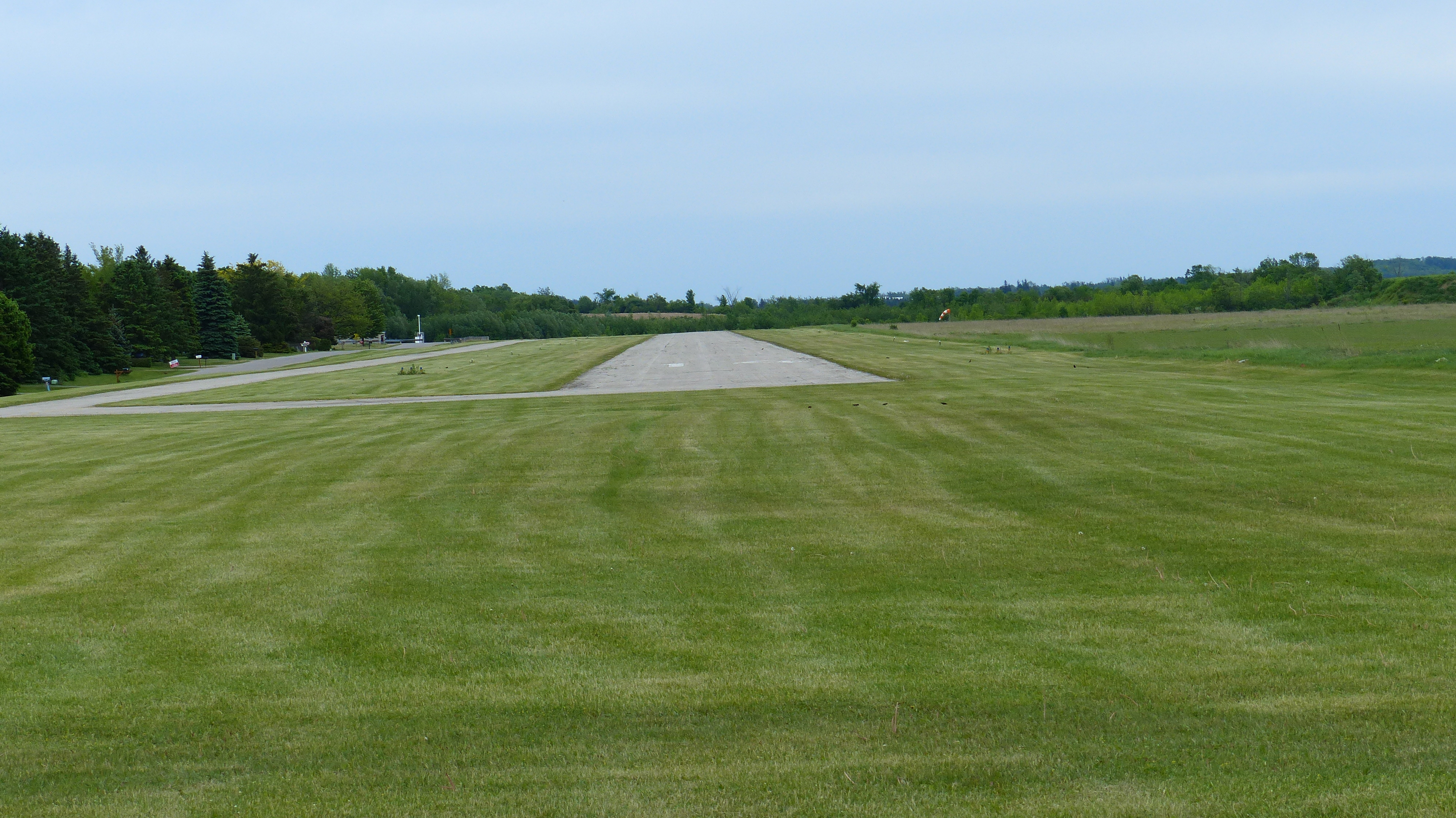
Runway 14

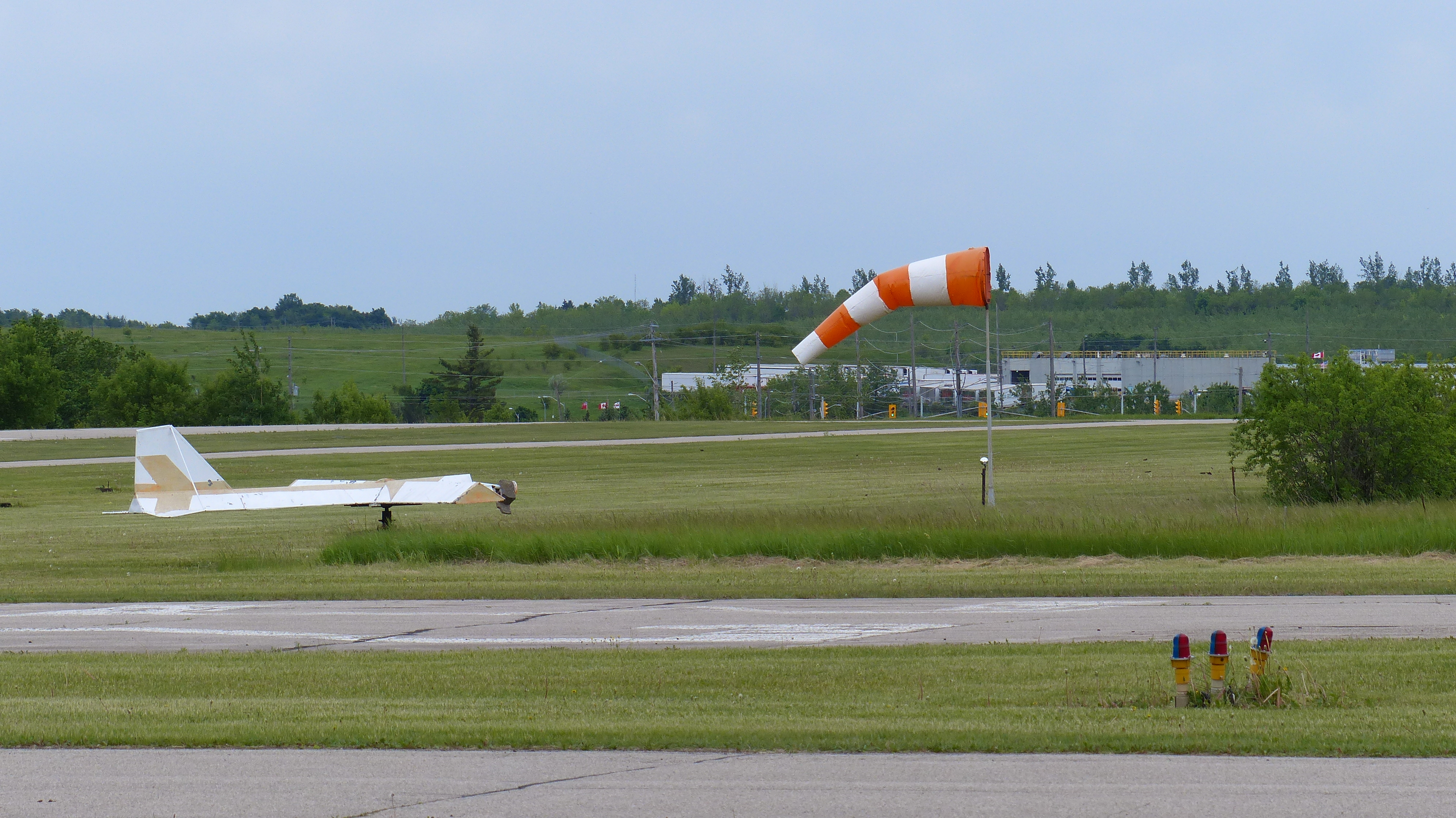
Wind tee and wind sock

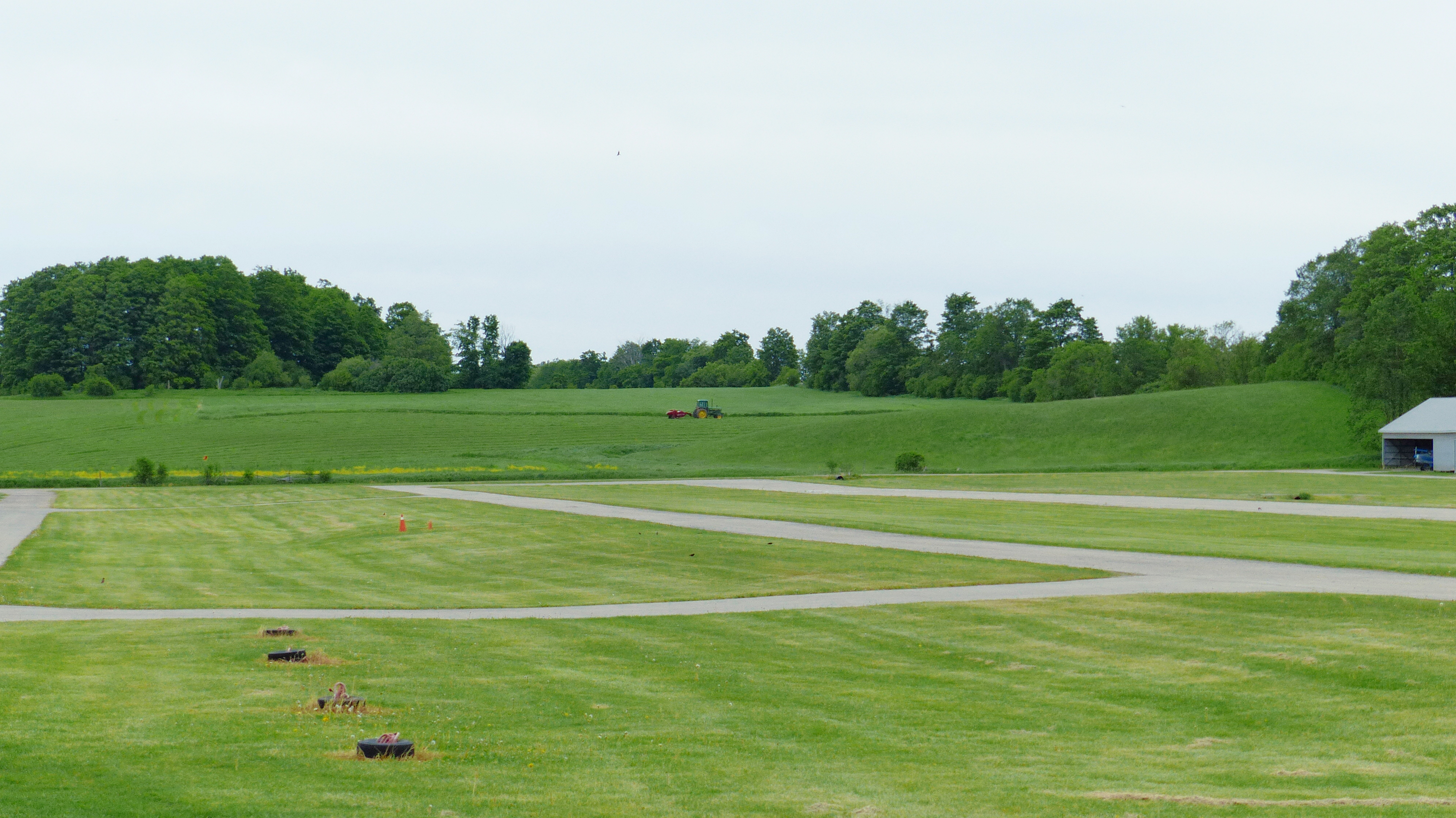
Obstruction, threshold of runway 23

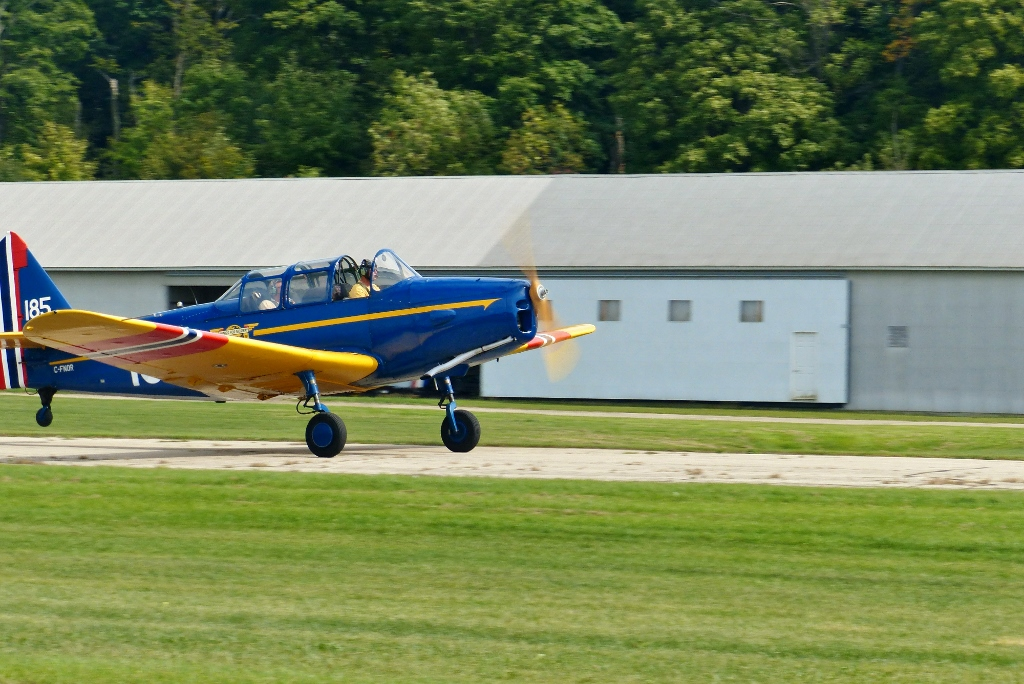
Royal Norwegian Air Force Cornell

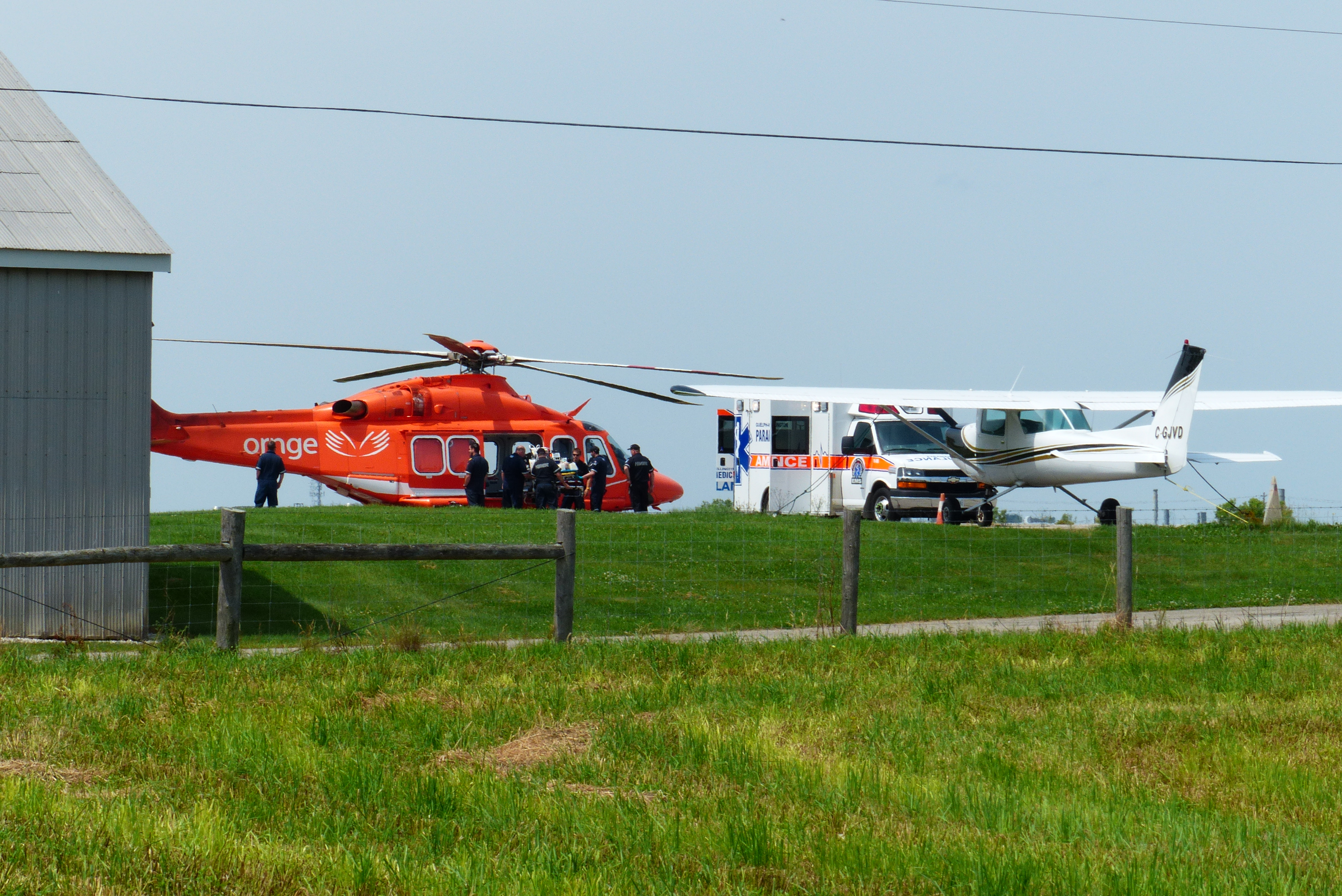
Ornge patient transfer

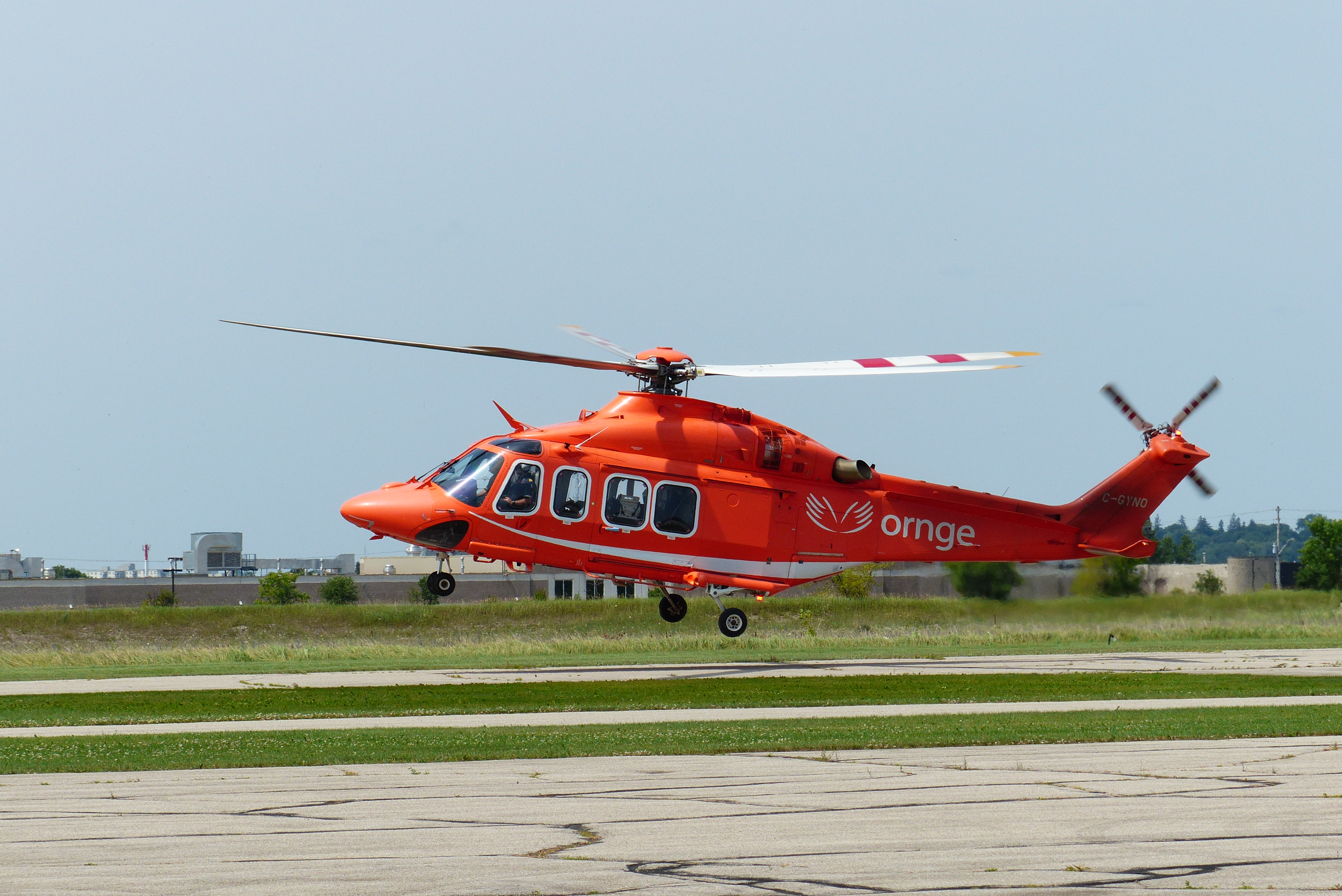
Ornge liftoff

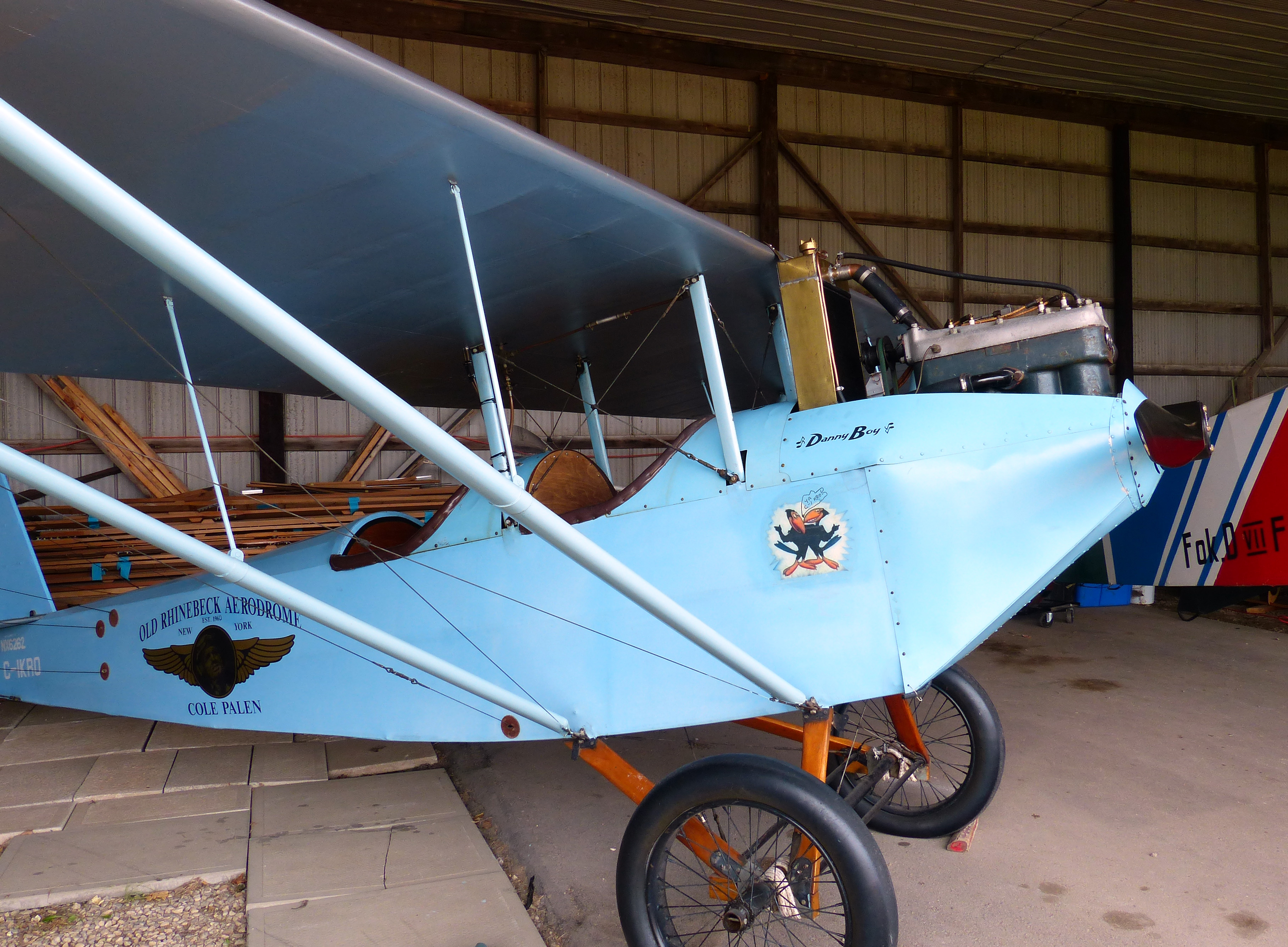
Danny Boy

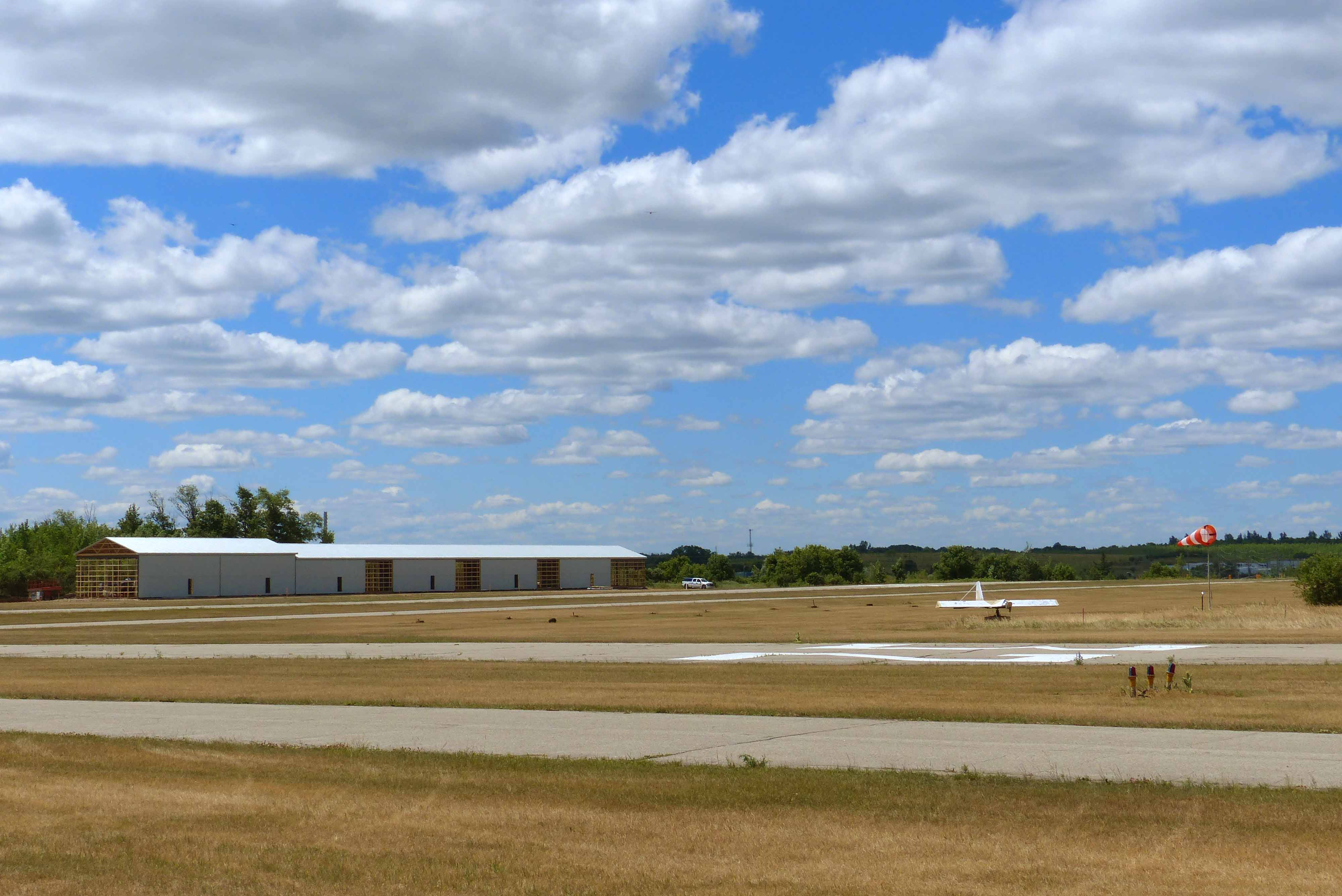
New hangars 2016
