= List of aircraft (Ti) =

This is a list of aircraft in alphabetical order beginning with 'Ti'.

== Ti ==
=== Tianxing-l ===
- Tianxing-l 1

=== Tiffany ===
(Sarter Tiffany)

- Tiffany Sport

=== Tiger ===
(Tiger Aircraft LLC, Martinsburg, WV)

- Tiger Aircraft AG-5B Tiger

=== Tiger Club Development ===
- Tiger Club Development Sherwood Ranger

=== Tijuana ===
(Tijuana Aircraft Co. / Waterhouse / BAJA California / Compañía Aérea de Construcción y Transportes)

- Tijuana BAJA California BC.1
- Tijuana BAJA California BC.2
- Tijuana BAJA California BC.3

=== Tikhonravov ===
- Tikhonravov 302
- Tikhonravov 302P

=== Tilbury ===
(Owen R Tilbury, Normal, IL, Tilbury & (Clarence) Fundy, Bloomington, IL or IN)

- Tilbury S-10 Skywayman
- Tilbury SF-1 Flash

=== Time to Fly ===
(Kaunas, Lithuania)

- Time To Fly Backplane SL
- Time To Fly Racket
- Time To Fly Scooter

=== Time Warp Aircraft ===
(Lakeland, FL)

- Time Warp Spitfire Mk V

=== Timm ===
(O W (Otto William) Timm Aircraft Corp, 901 N San Fernando Rd, Glendale, CA)

- Timm 160
- Timm Aerocraft 2AS
- Timm Argonaut
- Timm AG-2
- Timm C-165 Collegiate
- Timm C-170 Collegiate
- Timm C-185 Collegiate
- Timm K-90 Collegiate
- Timm K-100 Collegiate
- Timm M-150 Collegiate
- Timm TC-165 Collegiate
- Timm TW-120 Collegiate
- Timm Coach
- Timm Curtiss Pusher replica
- Timm Monoplane
- Timm P Sedan
- Timm PT-160K
- Timm PT-175K
- Timm PT-220
- Timm S-160
- Timm Skylark
- Timm T-800
- Timm T-840 Aeromold Transport
- Timm N2T Tutor

=== Timofeyev ===
(Viktor Timofeyev)

- Timofeyev Mustang 2

=== Tipsy ===
(Avions Tipsy) See also List of aircraft (0-A)#Avions Fairey

- Tipsy B side by side trainer
- Tipsy Bc side by side cabin version of B
- Tipsy Belfair
- Tipsy Junior
- Tipsy M
- Tipsy Nipper
- Tipsy S
- Tipsy S.2

=== Tipton ===
(George W "Billy" Tipton, Old Richards Airport, Kansas City, MO)

- Tipton 90-2
- Tipton W-7200X

=== Tisserand ===
(Designer: Claude Tisserand)

- Tisserand Hydroplum
- Tisserand Hydroplum Ia
- Tisserand Hydroplum II
- Tisserand Pétrel

=== Tissot-Charbonnier ===
- Tissot-Charbonnier TC-160 Oceanair

=== Titan ===
(Titan Aircraft, Austinburg Ohio)

- Titan Tornado
- Titan Tornado 103
- Titan Tornado Sport
- Titan Tornado MG
- Titan Tornado I
- Titan Tornado I Sport
- Titan Tornado II
- Titan Tornado II Trainer
- Titan Tornado II Sport
- Titan Tornado II 912
- Titan Tornado II FP
- Titan Tornado MG II
- Titan Tornado S
- Titan Tornado SS
- Titan T-51 Mustang

=== Titanium ===
(Titanium Auto Gyro)

- Titanium Explorer
