= Miami Maid =

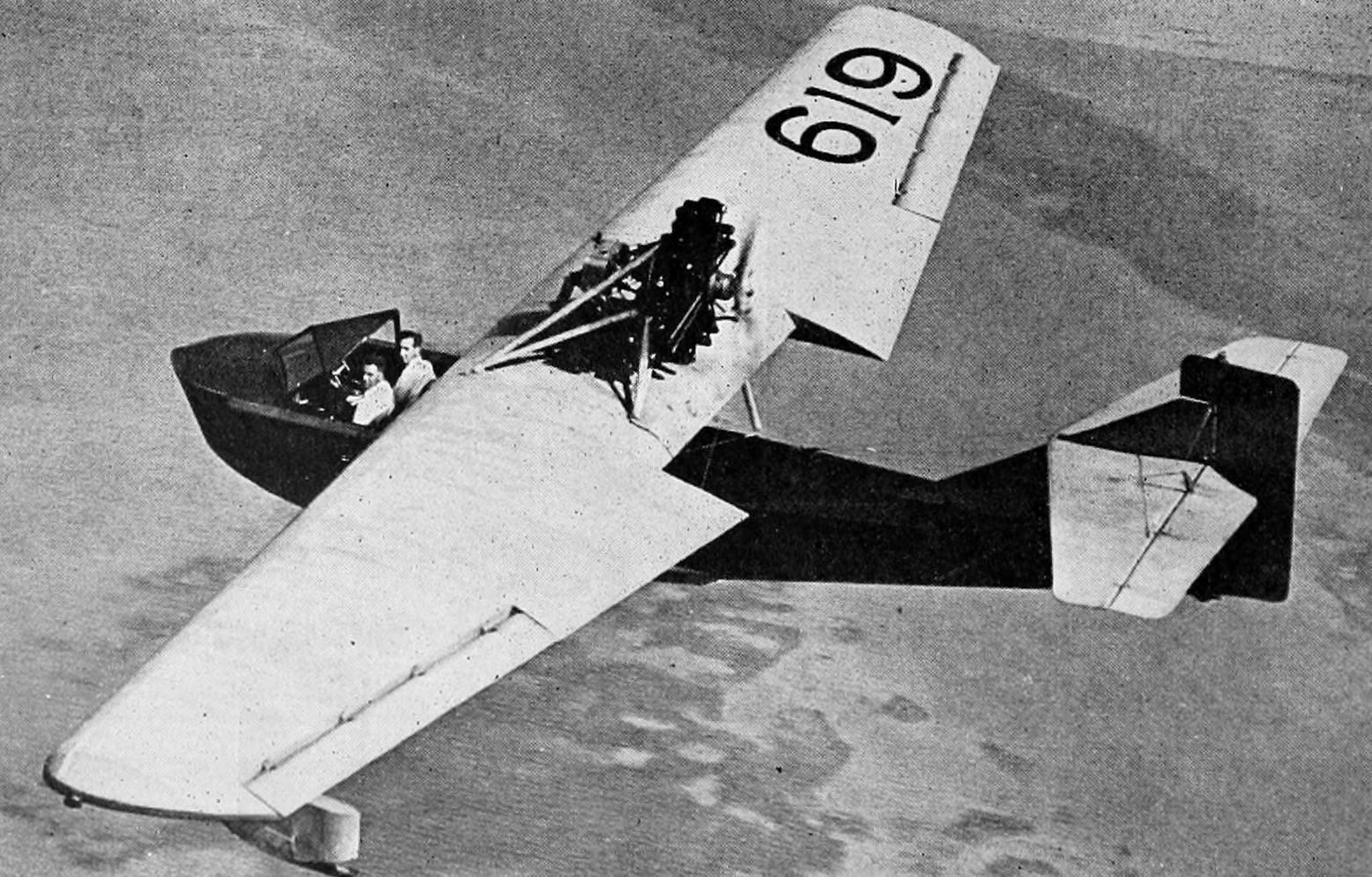

General information
- Type: Civil
- National origin: US
- Manufacturer: Miami Aircraft Company
- Designer: L. C. McCarthy, Jnr
- Number built: 2

History
- First flight: 26 March 1929

The Miami Maid was a US three passenger amphibious aircraft first flown in 1929. Despite ambitious production plans, only two were built.

== Design and development ==
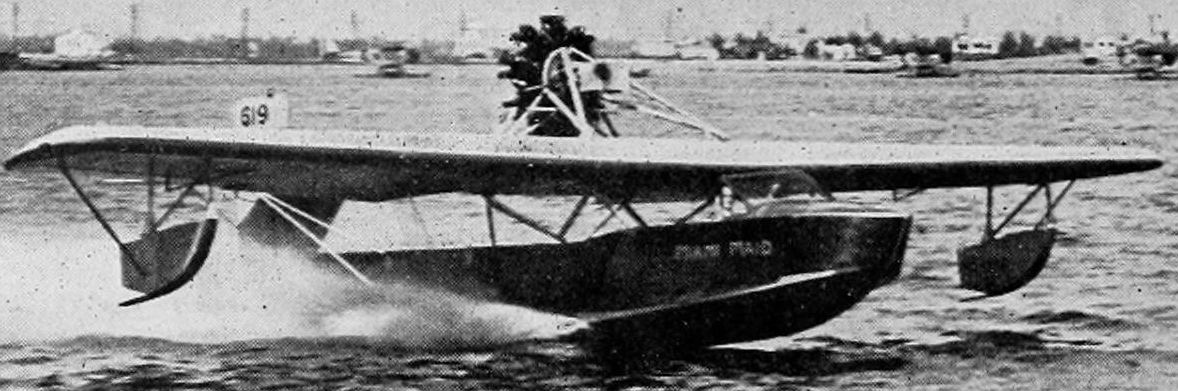
Miami 200 Maid in early tests

The Miami Maid was an all-wood flying boat with a cantilever parasol wing. It made use of existing components: the wing was a Fokker design and the hull that of a Curtiss F flying boat. In plan the wing was tetragonal out to rounded tips and swept only on the trailing edge. It was built from mahogany and spruce, with box spars and fabric-covering, and was held over the fuselage by pairs of inverted-V cabane struts between the upper fuselage longerons and the forward and aft wing spars, the latter outward-leaning. Narrow chord ailerons filled about half the span.

Its pusher mounted radial engine, a 256 hp (191 kW) Menasco-Salmson B-2 on the prototype, was strut-mounted and completely uncowled over the wing with its propeller turning in a deep, rectangular cutout in the trailing edge. Production aircraft were expected to use a 300 hp (220 kW) Wright Whirlwind J-6-9.

The two step hull of the Maid had an ash framework, including the longerons, keel and transverse steps. The outer surfaces were mahogany with double planking on the planing bottom and plywood elsewhere. The hull was divided internally into five water-tight compartments. Stability on the water was provided by two narrow, unstepped, under-wing floats, each mounted on three struts. The two crew sat side-by-side ahead of the wing leading edge. Photographs show them protected by two different windshield designs, one an inclined, one-piece screen, and the other an inclined, two-piece swept unit strengthened by a horizontal, triangular sheet that gave better protection. This open cockpit could be quickly enclosed if necessary. Its three passengers sat on a long seat behind the crew.

The Maid's empennage was angular, with a triangular fin and rectangular balanced rudder. Its tailplane, clipped triangular in plan, was braced on each side from below with pairs of vertically orientated V-struts from the fuselage to its front and rear. Its elevators were rectangular apart from a cut-out for rudder movement.

The Miami Maid was first flown, off water, on 26 March 1929. Early tests showed it had pleasant and responsive control characteristics. At that time the retractable undercarriage was not fitted, though the intention was to do this by the summer of 1929. It is not certain if this happened. It is also not known if the prototype was modified to accept the Whirlwind engine but a second aircraft was built and fitted with one.

In mid-1929 funding was being sought to build a Miami factory in which five Maids a month would be built but nothing came of it.

== Specifications (Menasco-Salmson B-2 engine) ==
Data from Aero Digest June 1929 except where noted. Performance data were calculated but mostly confirmed in early tests.

General characteristics

- Crew: two
- Capacity: three passengers
- Length: 33 ft (10 m) hull
- Wingspan: 44 ft (13 m)
- Wing area: 332 sq ft (30.8 m^{2})
- Empty weight: 1,900 lb (862 kg)
- Fuel capacity: 330 lb (150 kg)
- Payload: 660 lb (300 kg)
- Powerplant: 1 × Menasco-Salmson B-2 air-cooled radial engine, 260 hp (190 kW) at 1,725 rpm

Performance

- Maximum speed: 120 mph (190 km/h, 100 kn)
- Cruise speed: 100 mph (160 km/h, 87 kn)
- Range: 500 mi (800 km, 430 nmi)
- Service ceiling: 18,000 ft (5,500 m)
- Rate of climb: 880 ft/min (4.5 m/s)
- Landing speed: 52 mph (84 km/h; 45 kn)
