= Alexander Aircraft Company =

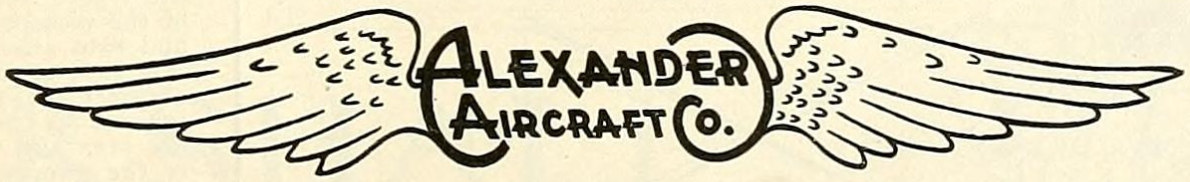
- Industry: Aerospace
- Predecessor: Alexander Film Company
- Founded: 1925
- Defunct: August 1932
- Successor: Aircraft Mechanics, Inc
- Headquarters: Englewood, Colorado, United States
- Key people: J. Don Alexander; Don M. Alexander
- Parent: Alexander Industries

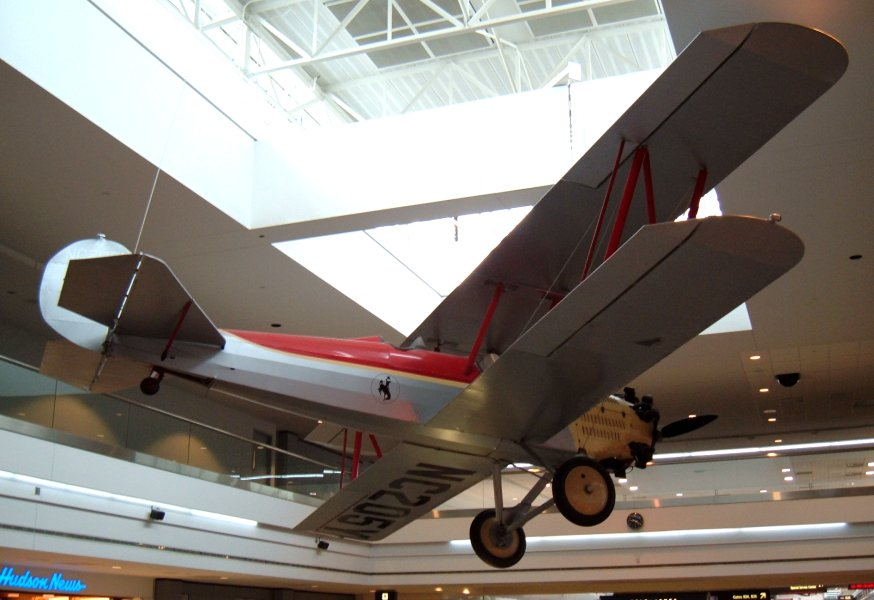
A 1930 Alexander Eaglerock Model A-14, now on display at Denver International Airport.

The Alexander Aircraft Company was an aircraft manufacturer founded in Colorado in 1925. It was briefly the world's largest aircraft manufacturer until going bankrupt in 1932 during the Great Depression.

== History ==
=== Founding ===
The company began life as an offshoot of the Alexander Film Company (Note: The Alexander Film Company was once the world's largest producer of theater film advertising, which was shown before trailers and ahead of the film. At its peak in the early 1950s, Alexander Film Company was producing 2000 to 3000 advertisement films annually and had an annual payroll over $2.5 million. Clients included a "who's who" of the nation's leading manufacturers including Ford, GM, U.S. Rubber, Philco, and Seven-Up. In the late 1950s it was "blacklisted" by industry professionals for opposing unionization, making it impossible for national advertisers to use their commercials, resulting in its collapse.) that specialized in film advertising, and the younger J. Don Alexander decided that they could sell more advertising if they had airplanes. He wrote to aircraft manufacturers asking for a quote on 50 airplanes, but the builders ignored his letter as the work of a crackpot. Alexander decided to build his own. He moved his operation to Englewood, Colorado and set up the aircraft company. He sent Justin McInaney to Marshall, Missouri to buy an airplane and learn to fly. Justin's instructor was the great Ben O. Howard, who later became famous as a racer and test pilot. Justin bought a Swallow airplane for $2,300 and flew it back to Denver, a trip with many forced landings. Justin then taught others to fly, including Jack Frye (later president of TWA) and airplane designer Al Mooney. Sales of the aircraft reached eight aircraft a day, just before the depression hit.

=== Disaster ===
By 1928, the company was having trouble meeting demand from its jury-rigged factory in Englewood. Operating from a small town enabled the company to evade fire and building codes, but there were rumours that Englewood would be annexed by nearby Denver and regulations would be enforced. The company directors began to prepare for a move to other cities while using the threat of leaving to extort concessions out of the town.

Just before noon on 20 April 1928, a fire started in the shed where aircraft wings were coated with highly flammable cellulose nitrate 'dope.' A back room was crowded with seamstresses sewing fabric. All of the windows were high and barred, the walls and floors were soaked in the flammable chemical, as were the uniforms of the workers. The only exits from the building were in the doping room and opened inwards. The doping shed was engulfed in fire and explosions, the exits became crowded with fleeing workers, and eleven workers were burned alive. Many others were horribly burned.

Both Alexander brothers and three other company officials were charged with voluntary manslaughter. They pleaded guilty to failure to provide sufficient means of escape, failure to have doors opening outward, failure to provide proper ventilation, and failure to provide proper sanitation in exchange for the manslaughter charge being dropped. They were fined a total of $1,000 and given suspended 90-day jail sentences.

=== Expansion ===
With its Englewood factory closed by the Arapahoe County Sheriff, the company moved overnight to new facilities they were building in Colorado Springs.

By 1931 the company had an established manufacturing plant between Pikeview and Roswell in El Paso County, west of the Atchison, Topeka and Santa Fe Railway and U.S. Route 85. The company went bankrupt in August 1932 and was acquired by Aircraft Mechanics Inc., founded by W. F. Theis and Proctor W. Nichols, in April 1937. It produced components for the Douglas Aircraft Company during World War II, US Air Force ejection seats, and Space Shuttle crew seats.

=== Legacy ===
For a brief period from 1928 to 1929, Alexander was the largest aircraft manufacturer in the world, and more aircraft were built in Colorado than anywhere else in the world. In the early 1930s, the firm built a revolutionary new plane—the forerunner of modern aircraft, with a low wing and retractable gear—called the "Bullet". Several of them crashed in the testing process because the government insisted that the unspinnable plane be tail-spun. The plane later was certificated, though, and became famous in racing and civil aviation. The depression and losses suffered in the Bullet program forced the aircraft firm to fold in the mid-1930s. Alexander would also be known for starting the career of Al Mooney, the founder of Mooney Aircraft, a general aircraft manufacturer that continues in operation in Kerrville, Texas.

== Aircraft ==
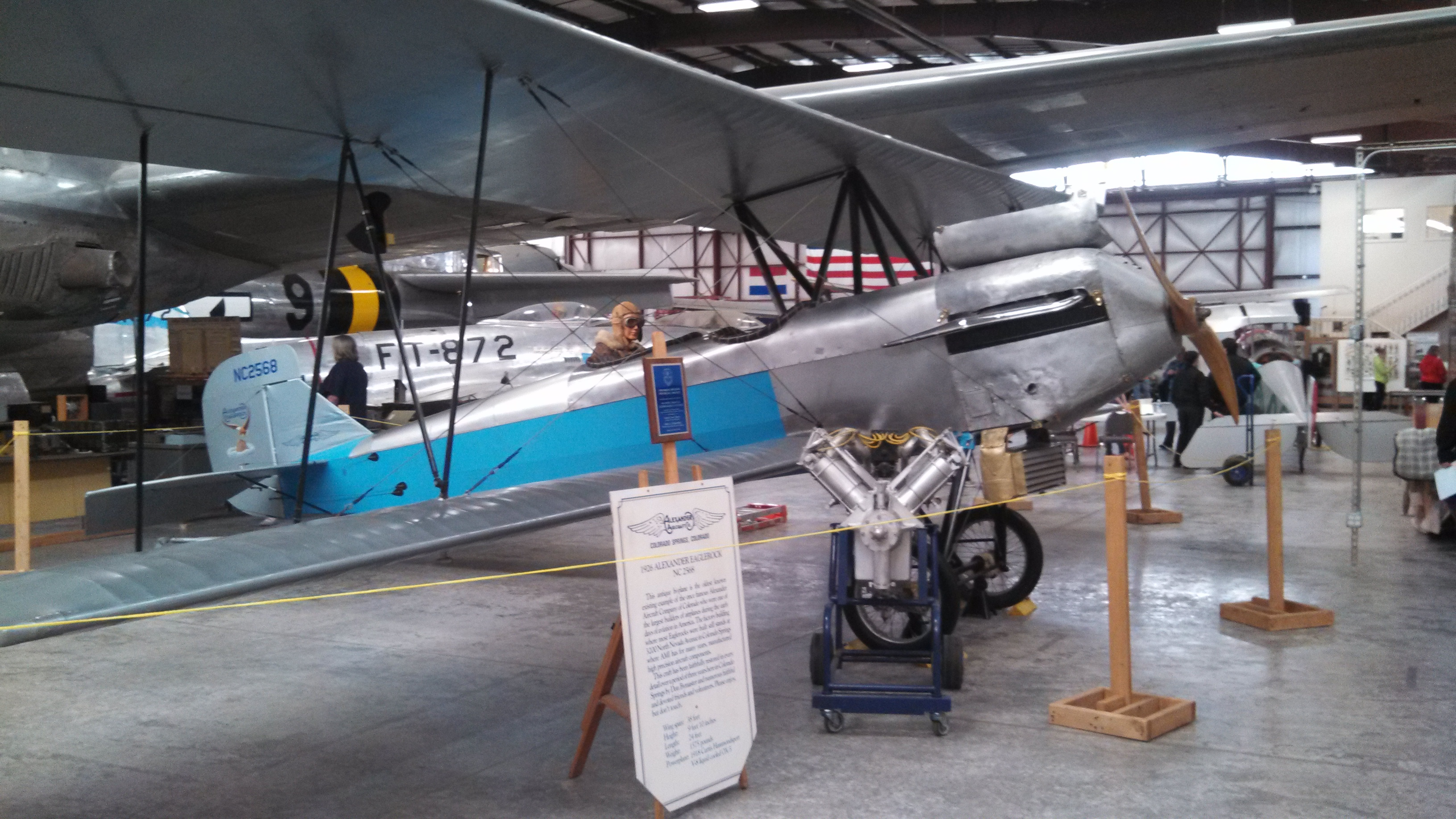
An Eaglerock 24 on display at Pueblo Weisbrod Aircraft Museum, 2013

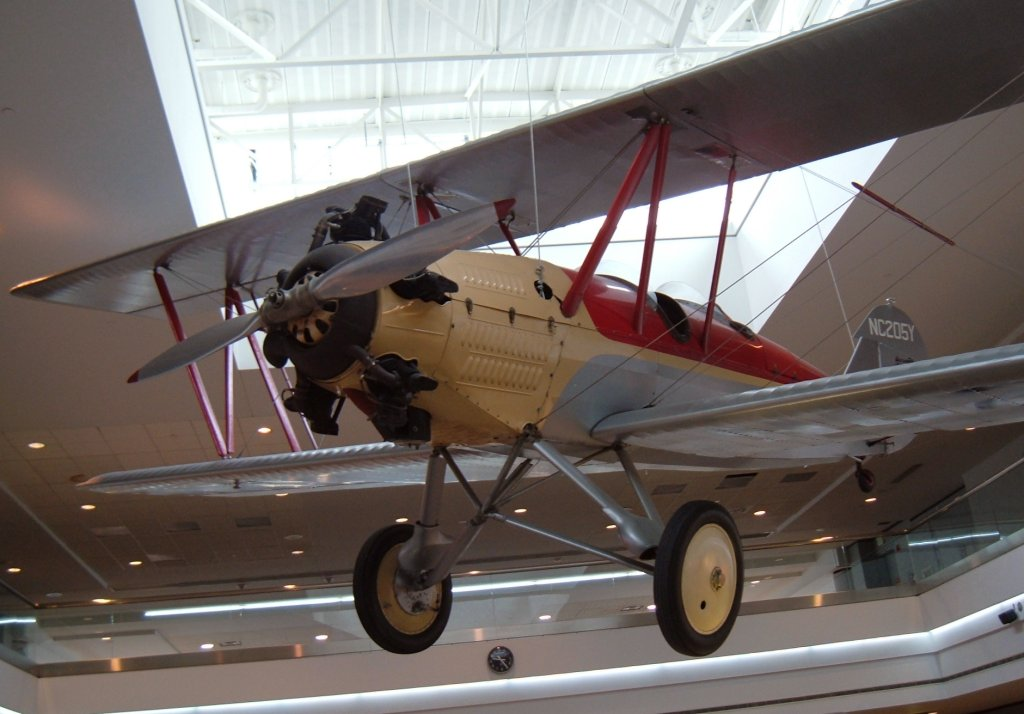
An Eaglerock on display at Denver International Airport

Model name	First flight	Number built	Type
Alexander Eaglerock	1925	893	Two seat biplane
Alexander Bullet	1929	12	Four seat low-wing monoplane
Alexander Flyabout D-1	1931	3	Two seat monoplane
Alexander Flyabout D-2	1931	15	Two seat monoplane
