= North American NA-35 =

American trainer aircraft prototype

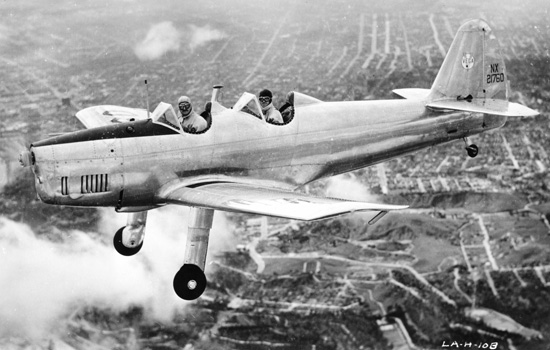

General information
- Type: Training aircraft
- National origin: United States of America
- Manufacturer: North American Aviation
- Number built: 1

History
- First flight: 1940

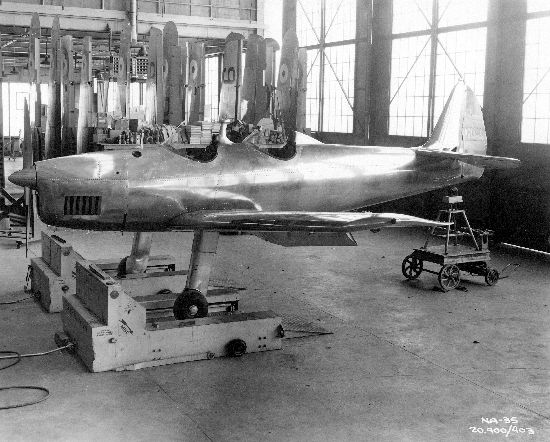
North American NA-35

The North American NA-35 was a training aircraft designed by North American Aviation. It was first test-flown in January 1940 by Vance Breese. Although announced for trade the month after, the project was pushed aside by plant expansions and the development of the P-51 Mustang. Further test flights were conducted and construction began on a few more aircraft, but the project remained stagnant until Vega Aircraft Corporation bought the rights to the aircraft in October 1940 to develop into the Vega 35.

== Specifications ==
Data from

General characteristics

- Crew: two
- Length: 25 ft 6 in (7.77 m)
- Wingspan: 29 ft 10 in (9.09 m)
- Height: 6 ft 11 in (2.11 m)
- Wing area: 147.2 sq ft (13.68 m^{2})
- Airfoil: NACA-4416R at root, tapering to NACA-6409R at tip
- Empty weight: 1,218 lb (552 kg)
- Gross weight: 1,760 lb (798 kg)
- Powerplant: 1 × Menasco C4S-2 , 150 hp (110 kW)

Performance

- Maximum speed: 140 mph (230 km/h, 120 kn)
- Cruise speed: 124 mph (200 km/h, 108 kn)
- Range: 305 mi (491 km, 265 nmi)
- Service ceiling: 18,500 ft (5,600 m)
- Rate of climb: 900 ft/min (4.6 m/s)

== See also ==
Aircraft of comparable role, configuration, and era

- Naval Aircraft Factory XN5N
- Timm N2T Tutor
