= Neilson Golden Bear =

NC-1 Golden Bear
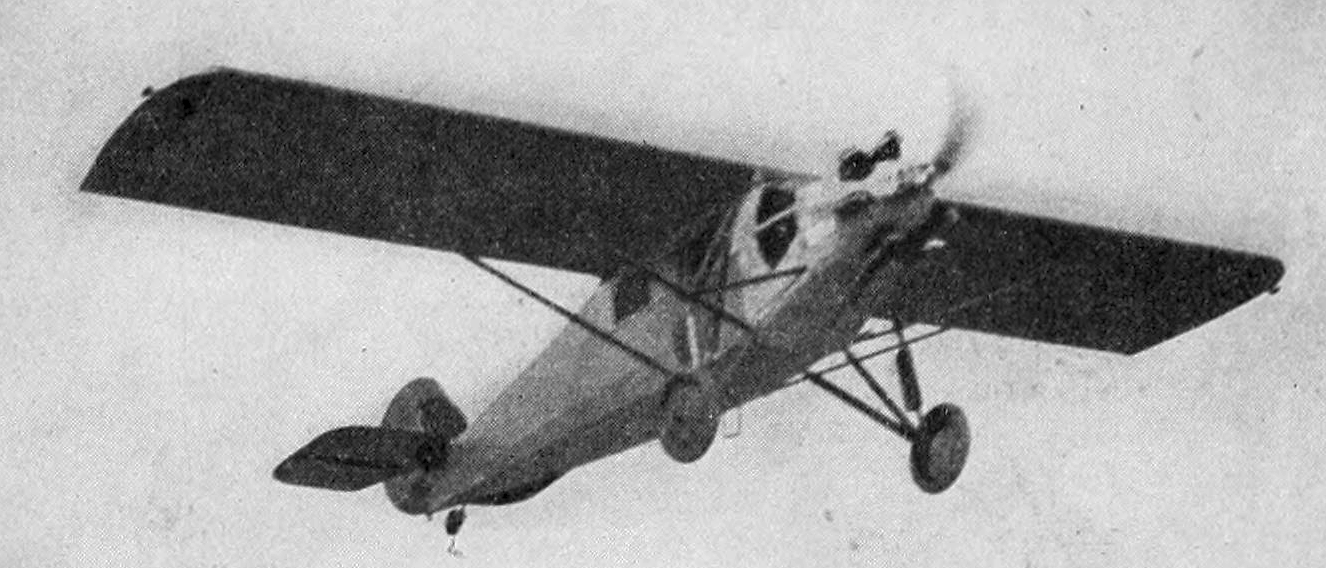

General information
- Type: Three seat cabin monoplane
- National origin: United States
- Manufacturer: Neilson Steel Aircraft Co.
- Designer: R.F.Korman
- Number built: 1

History
- First flight: 1929

The Neilson NC-1 Golden Bear, aka Neilson Coach was an American, three-place, high wing cabin aircraft, flown in 1929. It did not go into production.

== Design and development ==
The Golden Bear was a handcrafted high wing aircraft designed and built by R. F. Korman along with brothers Thomas Neilson and Duncan Neilson, owners of Neilson Steel Aircraft Corporation. The aircraft was constructed around a welded steel tube structure which incorporated chrome-molybdenum alloys where stresses were high. The two spar wing was rectangular in plan and braced to the lower fuselage longerons with parallel struts from the spars. The central wing was joined to the top of the cabin. On the prototype the wing, like the rest of the aircraft, was fabric-covered, though production models would have had metal covering.

The prototype was powered by a 150 hp (110 kW) Comet 7-D seven cylinder radial engine, mounted with its cylinder heads exposed for cooling, though the second example was scheduled to have a seven cylinder 300 hp (220 kW) Wright J-6-7 Whirlwind. The cabin was well-windowed for both pilot and passengers, with a windowed luggage compartment aft and doors on both sides. There were two unusual safety features. The central wing structure provided space for an aircraft rescue parachute, a concept under test at the time. Second, the cabin doors could be jettisoned together in flight with a single lever so that the two passengers could escape individually and rapidly by parachute. The tail was conventional, with a low aspect ratio, roughly rectangular plan horizontal tail mounted on top of the fuselage. It had a cropped triangular fin with a rounded, balanced rudder which reached down to the keel.

The Golden Bear had conventional, fixed landing gear, with independent axles and drag struts from the lower fuselage longerons. The vertical, shock absorbing legs were mounted on the forward wing struts at points reinforced by short struts to both upper and lower fuselage longerons. Its tailwheel was also fitted with a shock absorber.

Golden Bear's first flight occurred on May 15, 1929 from the then new Berkeley, California airport. Its test programme was flown by Ray Crayford. By August 1929 the first production shop of a proposed factory was completed. The prototype survived until August 1939 when it was destroyed by a crowd at an Oakland Speedway thrill show, disappointed at not getting their money's worth. It is not known if the second example was completed.

== Specifications ==
Data from Aero Digest (September 1929)

General characteristics

- Crew: one
- Capacity: two passengers
- Length: 29 ft (8.8 m)
- Wingspan: 37 ft (11 m)
- Height: 8 ft 6 in (2.59 m)
- Airfoil: Clark Y
- Empty weight: 1,400 lb (635 kg)
- Payload: 800 lb (360 kg)
- Fuel capacity: 50 US gal (42 imp gal; 190 L)
- Powerplant: 1 × Comet 7-D 7 cylinder radial, 150 hp (110 kW)
- Propellers: two-bladed

Performance

- Maximum speed: 135 mph (217 km/h, 117 kn)
- Cruise speed: 110 mph (180 km/h, 96 kn)
- Landing speed: 40 mph (64 km/h; 35 kn)
- Range: 800 mi (1,300 km, 700 nmi)
- Service ceiling: 16,000 ft (4,900 m)
- Rate of climb: 900 ft/min (4.6 m/s) initial
