= Naval Aircraft Factory XN5N =

XN5N
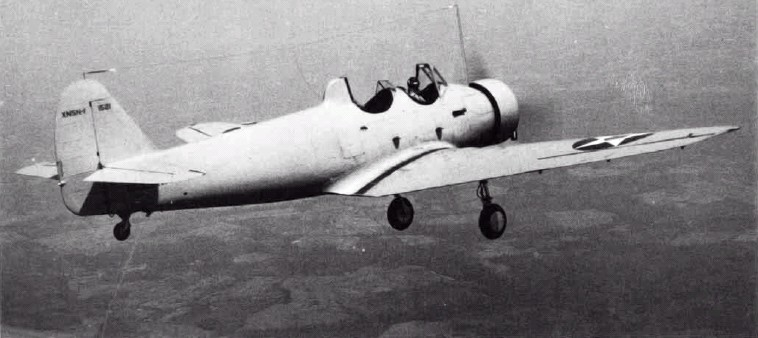
- The Naval Aircraft Factory XN5N-1 in 1941

General information
- Type: Trainer
- Manufacturer: Naval Aircraft Factory
- Number built: 1

History
- First flight: 15 February 1941
- Retired: 1947

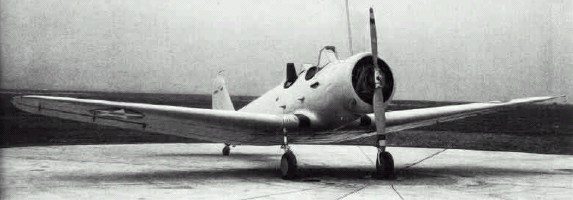
The XN5N-1 in 1941

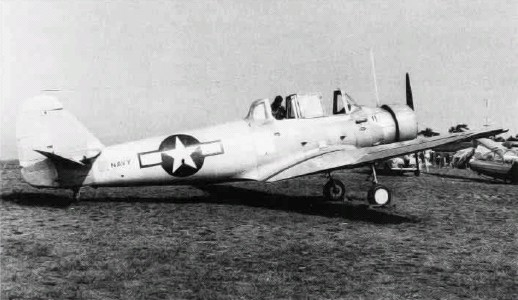
The XN5N-1 late in the war

The Naval Aircraft Factory XN5N was a prototype United States monoplane trainer aircraft produced by the Naval Aircraft Factory in Philadelphia, Pennsylvania in 1941. A single prototype was built and evaluated.

The type was not placed in production.

== Specifications (XN5N-1) ==
Data from Aerofiles : Naval Aircraft Factory

General characteristics

- Crew: 2
- Length: 30 ft 5 in (9.27 m)
- Wingspan: 42 ft 0 in (12.8 m)
- Powerplant: 1 × Wright R-760 seven-cylinder air-cooled radial piston engine, 350 hp (260 kW)
- Propellers: 2-bladed variable-pitch propeller

Performance

- Maximum speed: 137 mph (220 km/h, 119 kn)
- Service ceiling: 13,900 ft (4,200 m)

== See also ==
Aircraft of comparable role, configuration, and era

- North American NA-35
- Timm N2T Tutor
- Vultee BT-13 Valiant
