= Alexander Eaglerock Bullet =

Bullet Monoplane
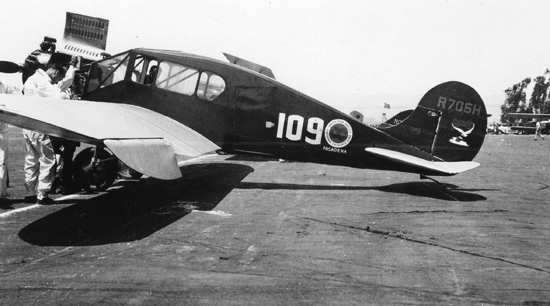

General information
- Type: Cabin monoplane
- National origin: United States
- Manufacturer: Alexander Aircraft Company
- Designer: Albert Mooney
- Number built: 11

History
- Introduction date: 1929
- First flight: February 1929

The Bullet Monoplane or Alexander Eaglerock Bullet was a low wing cabin monoplane that was a departure from traditional biplane aircraft of the era.

== Design and development ==
The Bullet was built at the beginning of the Great Depression. Company owner J Don Alexander said he was inspired by ducks tucking in their legs to build a retractable landing gear-equipped aircraft. The aircraft experienced stability problems in spin testing, killing two pilots. Few orders were delivered.

The Bullet was a low wing, cabin aircraft with retractable conventional landing gear. The fuselage was constructed with welded steel tubing and the wings were constructed with wooden spars and ribs, both with aircraft fabric covering.

== Operational history ==
An Alexander Eaglerock Bullet competed in the 1929 National Air Races. Female pilot Jessie "Chubbie" Keith-Miller won two transcontinental air races piloting an Alexander Eaglerock Bullet.

== Variants ==
Data from: Aerofiles

Eaglerock Bullet C-1
Powered by a Wright J-6 Whirlwind
Eaglerock Bullet C-3
Powered by a Kinner K-5
Eaglerock Bullet C-4
Powered by a 165 hp (123 kW) Wright J-6 5-cylinder radial (optional 165 hp (123 kW) Comet 7-E or 150 hp (112 kW) Axelson-Floco B)
Eaglerock Bullet C-5
Powered by a 165 hp (123 kW) Wright J-6 5-cylinder radial (optional 165 hp (123 kW) Comet 7-E or 150 hp (112 kW) Axelson-Floco B)
Eaglerock Bullet C-7
Aerodynamically improved - ATC#318 issued on 6 May 1930.

== Specifications (C-7 Bullet) ==
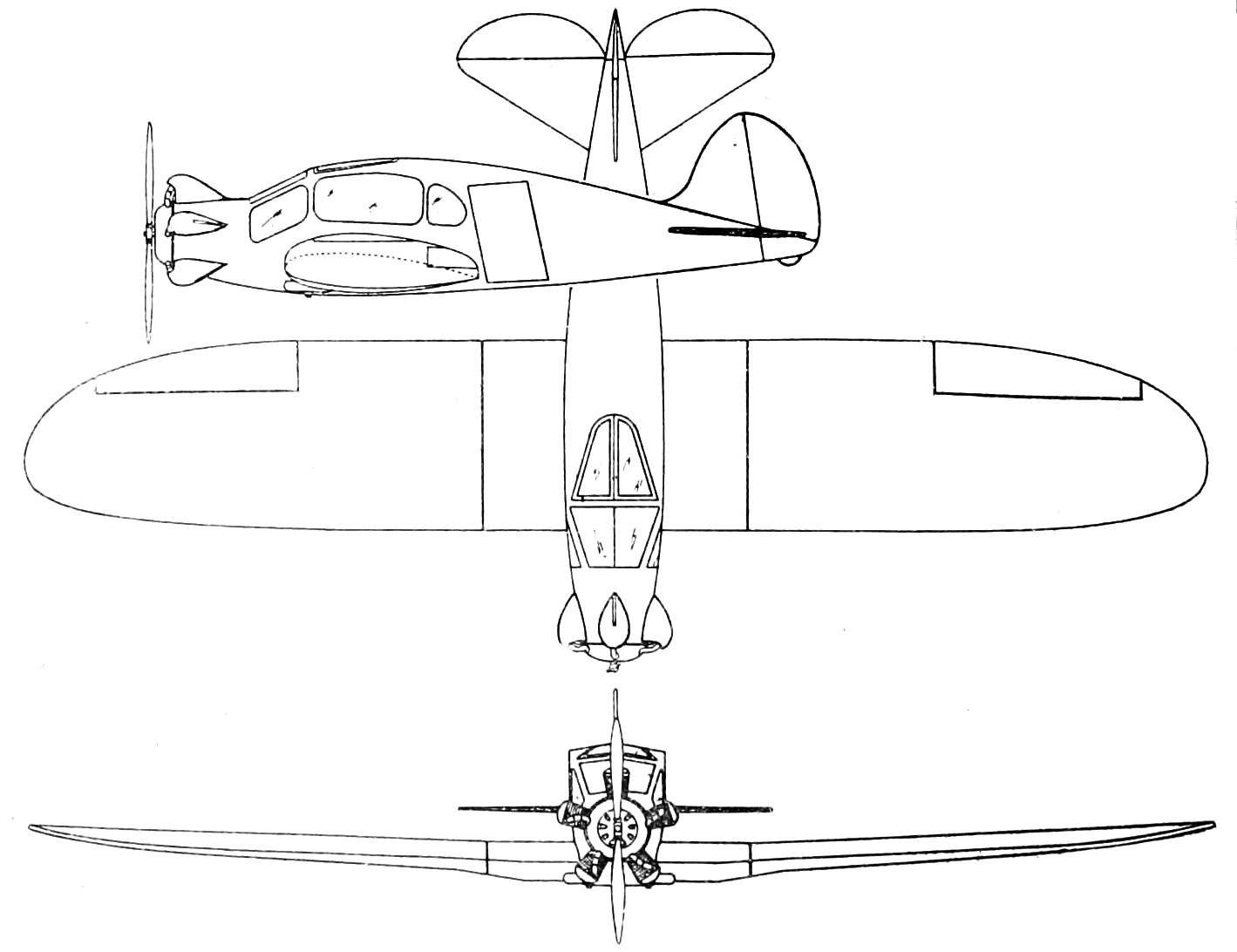
Alexander Eaglerock C-3 Bullet 3-view drawing from Aero Digest May 1929

Data from American Airplane Specifications

General characteristics

- Crew: 1
- Capacity: 3 passengers
- Length: 26 ft 10 in (8.18 m)
- Wingspan: 36 ft 0 in (10.97 m)
- Height: 7 ft 9 in (2.36 m)
- Wing area: 208 sq ft (19.3 m^{2})
- Empty weight: 1,720 lb (780 kg)
- Gross weight: 2,780 lb (1,261 kg)
- Fuel capacity: 44 US gal (170 L; 37 imp gal)
- Powerplant: 1 × Wright J-6 Whirlwind 7-cylinder air-cooled radial engine, 165 hp (123 kW)

Performance

- Maximum speed: 148 mph (238 km/h, 129 kn)
- Cruise speed: 122 mph (196 km/h, 106 kn)
- Stall speed: 45 mph (72 km/h, 39 kn)
- Range: 560 mi (900 km, 490 nmi)
- Service ceiling: 17,000 ft (5,200 m)
- Rate of climb: 700 ft/min (3.6 m/s)
