= Timm T-840 =

T-840
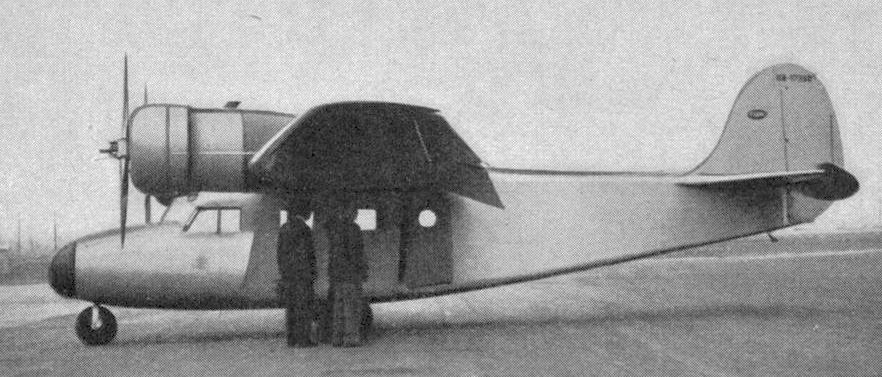

General information
- Type: Six to ten seat passenger transport
- National origin: United States
- Manufacturer: Timm Aircraft Corporation
- Designer: Wally Timm
- Number built: 1

History
- First flight: February 1938

The Timm T-840 was a twin engine, high wing passenger aircraft designed and flown in the United States in 1938. Equipped with a tricycle undercarriage and low speed aerodynamic devices, it could be configured to carry between six and ten passengers. Only one was built.

== Design and development ==
The Timm T-840, a development of the unbuilt but similar T-800 was an advanced design for its day, featuring a tricycle undercarriage and semi-cantilever high wing for easy access, together with a combination of Handley Page slots with slotted flaps and ailerons.

The T-840 was powered by two 420 hp (313 kW) Wright R-975 9-cylinder radial engines, mounted well forward and above the wing leading edge and enclosed in wide chord NACA cowlings. Behind them, fairings extended almost to the trailing edge of the wing. Between the fuselage and engines the wings had steel tube frames and were aluminium covered. Outboard of the engines the wings had two wooden spars, spruce and plywood ribs and were fabric covered. A pair of faired, parallel struts on each side ran from the bottom of the fuselage to the wing close to the engine. The slotted flaps had stressed aluminium skins and the slats were also metal, moving on rollers, but the ailerons had fabric covering over metal frames. The tail surfaces were conventional, with the tailplane mounted on top of the fuselage; like the fin, the tailplane was a plywood covered wooden structure. The control surfaces had metal structures and fabric covering; both elevators and rudder carried flight adjustable trim tabs.

The fuselage was flat sided, with the cabin seating the crew side-by-side just ahead of the wing leading edge but well behind the propeller plane. Behind them was the heated passenger cabin which could contain a maximum of ten seats. Six and eight seat configurations were offered, the former including a toilet and space for 200 lb (90 kg) of mail, the latter with the toilet removed. All configurations provided space for 180 lb (82 kg) of baggage.

The mainwheels of the fixed tricycle undercarriage were mounted on almost horizontal V-form half-axles from the bottom corner of the fuselage, with vertical oleo-pneumatic shock absorber legs joining axles to the wing underside aft of the engines. Brakes were fitted. The nosewheel, mounted on a similar shock absorber. was steerable. At the time of the first flight in February 1938, from the Timm works at Grand Central Air Terminal, Glendale, California, the wheels were not in fairings but later these were fitted.

== Specifications ==
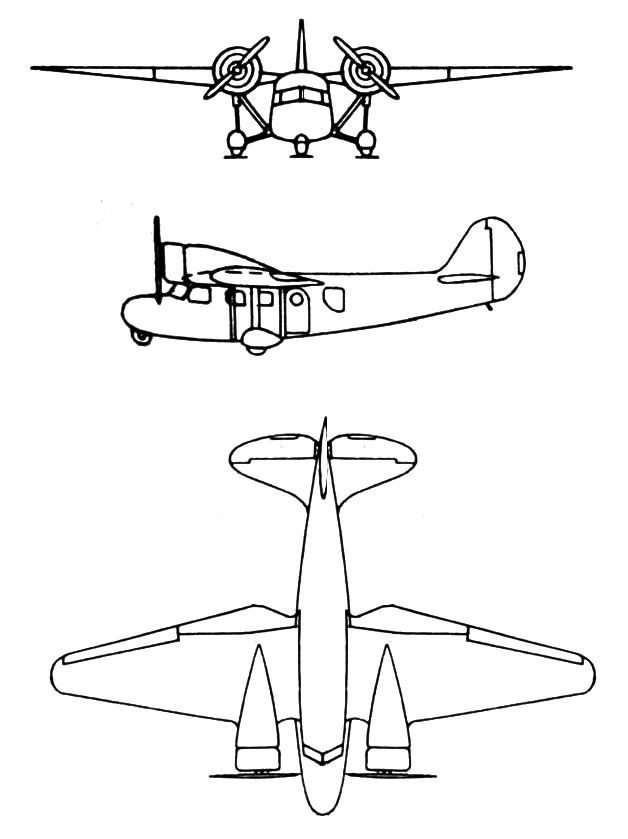
Timm T-840 3-view drawing from L'Aerophile April 1938

Data from Jane's All the World's Aircraft 1938

General characteristics

- Crew: 2
- Capacity: 6-10
- Length: 37 ft 6 in (11.43 m)
- Wingspan: 50 ft 0 in (15.24 m)
- Height: 12 ft 6 in (3.81 m)
- Wing area: 384 sq ft (35.7 m^{2})
- Empty weight: 5,281 lb (2,395 kg)
- Gross weight: 7,800 lb (3,538 kg)
- Fuel capacity: 180 US gal (150 Imp gal; 681 L)
- Powerplant: 2 × Wright R-975-E3 9-cylinder radial engine, 420 hp (310 kW) each
- Propellers: 2-bladed Hamilton-Standard constant speed

Performance

- Maximum speed: 204 mph (328 km/h, 177 kn) at sea level
- Cruise speed: 193 mph (311 km/h, 168 kn) at 5,000 ft (1,525 m) and 75% power
- Stall speed: 70 mph (110 km/h, 61 kn) flaps retracted
- Range: 705 mi (1,135 km, 613 nmi) at 75% power
- Service ceiling: 26,200 ft (8,000 m) absolute
- Rate of climb: 1,760 ft/min (8.9 m/s) initial
- Wing loading: 20.3 lb/sq ft (99 kg/m^{2})
- Power/mass: 0.11 hp/lb (0.18 kW/kg)
