= Comet 7-cylinder radial engines =

Comet 7-cylinder radial
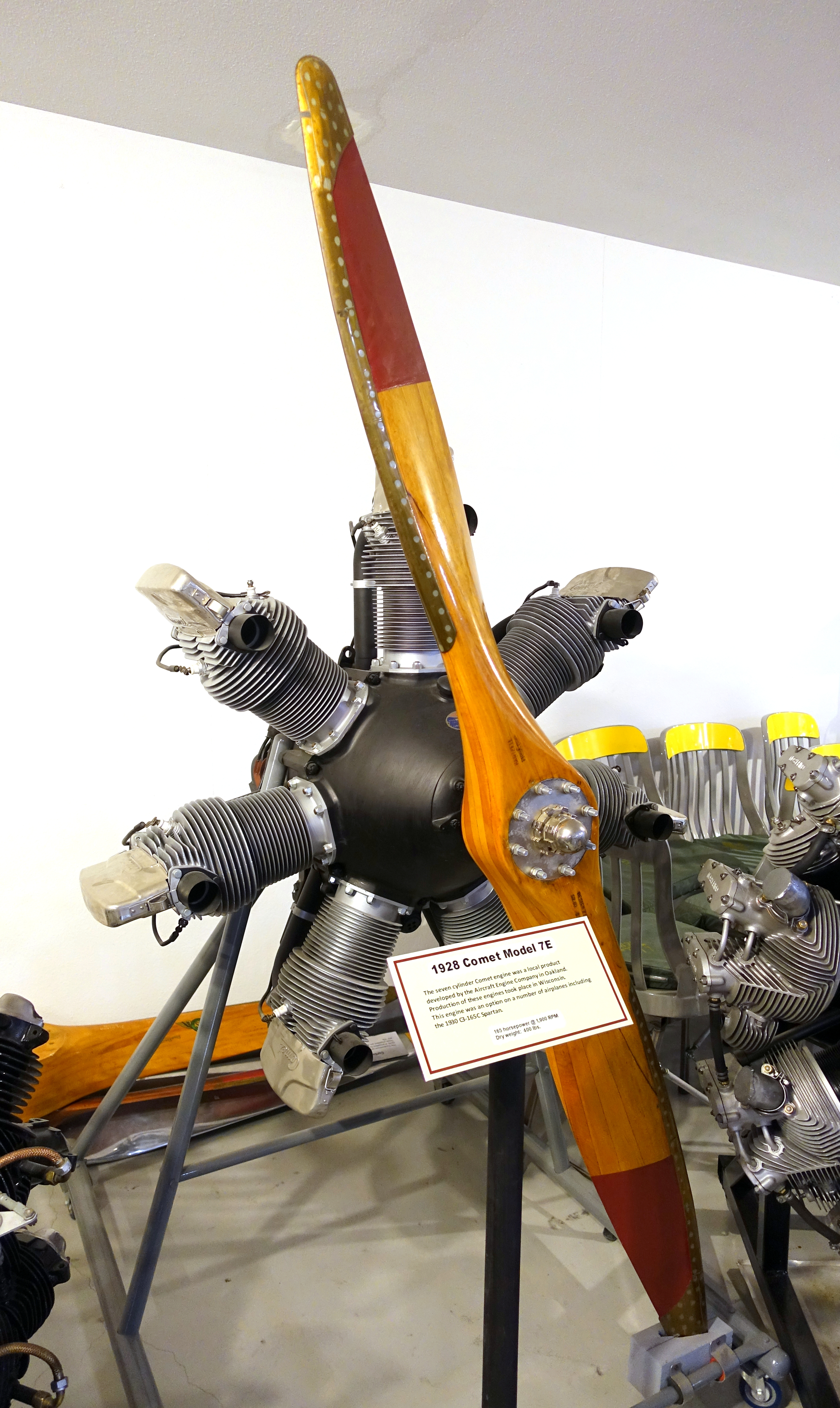
- A Comet 7-E on display at the Hiller Aviation Museum, San Carlos, California.
- Type: Radial engine
- National origin: United States
- Manufacturer: Comet Engine Corporation
- First run: c. 1928

The Comet 7-cylinder radials were a family of air-cooled radial engines, designed and built by the Comet Engine Corporation at Madison, Wisconsin from around 1927.

== Design and development ==
Comet designed the 7-cylinder radial series to take advantage of the boom in private aviation in the late 1920s; intending to replace the large number of relatively unreliable wartime surplus engines that flooded the market in the early 1920s.

First produced by the Aircraft Engine Corporation of Oakland, California, new interests acquired the California company and the Comet Engine Corporation was formed under the sponsorship of Air Investors Inc., the Crocker First Company of San Francisco and the Gisholt Machine Company.

Production transferred to workshops adjacent to the Gisholt Machine Company in Madison, which acted as production supervisor.

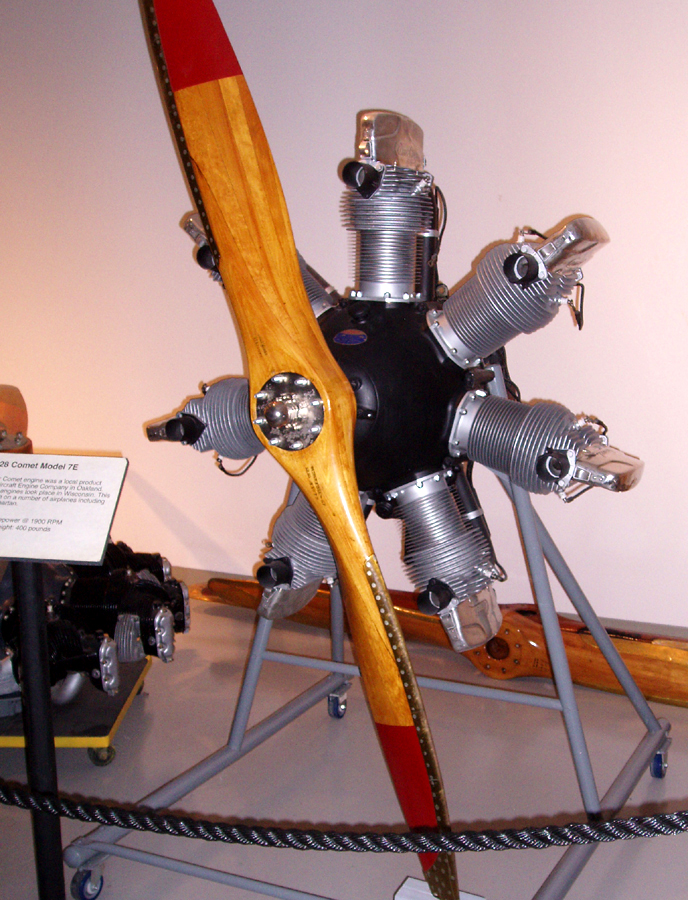
A Comet 7-E on display at the Hiller Aviation Museum, San Carlos, California.

The Comet radial was fairly standard with steel finned cylinders, cast light alloy cylinder heads and two valves per head. The valves are operated by a single rocker arms and push-rods, to the rear of the cylinder, which are in turn operated positively by inner and outer cam tracks operating rollers on the pushrod.

Oil pumps and magnetos are driven by the camshaft drives as well as the Heywood air starter and tachometer.

The two-piece crankshaft, with counter-weights, is carefully forged from heat-treated chrome-vanadium alloy steel and drilled for lightness and lubricating oil flow. Master and slave connecting rods are forged and machined from the same material as the crank-shaft. The rear of the crankshaft carries an induction rotor to ensure even mixture distribution to the cylinders from the Stromberg carburettor.

The two-piece crankcase is split in the plane of the cylinder centres, with the forward half supporting the fwd crank /prop-shaft bearing and the rear half housing the rear bearing, induction rotor, cam drives and accessories.

== Variants ==
Data from:'

7-RA
From 1928 with Approved Type Certificate No.9, rated initially at 130 hp (97 kW) at 1,800 rpm.
7-D
After improvements rated at 150 hp (112 kW) at 1,800 rpm (maximum continuous) from 612 cu in (10.0 L).
7-E
From 1929 with Approved Type Certificate No.47, delivering 165 hp (123 kW) from the same 612 cu in (10.0 L).

== Applications ==
Data from: Aerofiles : Aircraft of North America 1903-2003

- Adcox Student Prince
- Alexander Eaglerock Bullet C-4 (7-E option not installed)
- Alexander Eaglerock A-12 7-RA and some re-engined with 7-E
- Bach 3-CT-5 (2x 7-RA)
- Bach 3-CT-6 (2x 7-RA)
- Bird Wing Imperial (option)
- Briggs Briggster
- Cessna AC
- Curtiss Robin J-1 (7-D)
- Fairchild KR-34B (aka KR-34B-1) 7-RA
- Fairchild KR-34C (7-E)
- General Aristocrat 102-D proposed 7-RA
- Kreider-Reisner C-4 7-RA
- Kreider-Reisner C-4B 7-D
- Marine Water Sprite Marine Aircraft Co, Sausalito CA. - 7-E
- Maximum Safety M-2 7-RA
- Maximum Safety M-3 7-D
- Neilson Golden Bear
- Parks P-2 (option)
- Schroeder-Wentworth 1929 monoplane 7-RA
- Sierra BLW-1 7-RA
- Sierra BLW-2 7-RA
- Spartan C3-166 7-E
- Stearman C3L 7-RA
- Thaden T-2 7-D
- Timm C-165 Collegiate 7-E
- Timm K-100 Collegiate 7-RA
- Towle TA-1 7-D
- Towle WC Amphibion 7-D
- Travel Air 4-U conversion to 7-RA, 7-D and 7-E by O W Timm Aircraft Co.
- Triton Water Sprite, Triton Aircraft Co, Sausalito CA. 7-E
- Warren CP-1 7-D

== Specifications (variant) ==
Data from Aero Digest September 1929: The new Comet radial engine

=== General characteristics ===
- Type: 7-cylinder air-cooled radial piston engine
- Bore: 4.5 in (114 mm)
- Stroke: 5.5 in (140 mm)
- Displacement: 612 cu in (10.0 L)
- Dry weight: 395 lb (179.2 kg) without exhaust manifold or propeller hub

=== Performance ===
- Power output: 130–150 hp (97–112 kW) at 1,800 rpm
- Specific fuel consumption: 0.55 lb/hp/h (0.093 kg/kW/ks)
- Oil consumption: 0.025 lb/hp/h (0.0042 kg/kW/ks)
