= Otto Timm =

American stunt aviator (1893–1978)

Otto William Timm
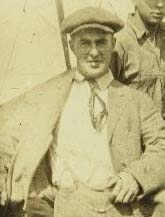
- c. 1920s
- Born: October 28, 1893; Lakefield, Minnesota, US
- Died: June 29, 1978 (aged 84); Newport Beach, California, US
- Spouse: Caroline Timm
- Relatives: Brother Wally Timm

Otto William Timm (October 28, 1893 – June 29, 1978) was an American barnstormer and aircraft manufacturer of German descent based in California. Charles Lindbergh's first flight was flown by Timm. Timm partnered at times with his brother Wally Timm who did a lot of flying for the nascent Hollywood movie industry.

== Early life ==
Timm was born on October 28, 1893, in Lakefield and spent a few years in Windom, Minnesota before moving to pursue aviation. By the age of 19, he had established himself as a pioneer aviator.

== Aviation career ==
Timm originally started in the aviation field in 1910 when he attempted to build a copy of the Santos-Dumont "Demoiselle" monoplane while living in Milwaukee, Wisconsin, although it appears this was never completed. The next year he moved to Cicero Field in Chicago, where a group of aviation enthusiasts had gathered. In Chicago, he built a copy of the Curtiss Pusher, which flew in 1911. Timm started a business flying the aircraft in Pennsylvania with a partner.

In 1913, Timm sold the business to his partner and returned to Cicero Field to begin construction of a "conventional" biplane design under contract. The next year he built a second for his own use, and started a cross-country tour that ended on May 25, 1915, when it crashed in a field in Magnolia, Minnesota. His aircraft happened to come down in the field of Bert Kinner, who repaired the engine. Kinner was fascinated by the aircraft, and would go on to become an aircraft and aero engine designer as well. Timm then built another design under contract for the Grinnell Aeroplane Company in 1915, later flying it at town fairs around the mideastern region during the summer of 1916.

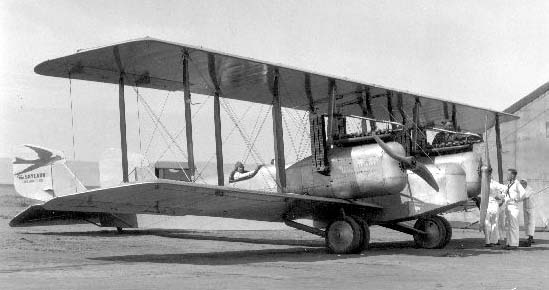
Timm Pacific Hawk

In October 1916, Timm became a senior flight instructor at Rockwell Field, San Diego. He remained there during the war, while also building a new trainer biplane known as the Timm Model T-18. With the ending of the war, Timm moved to Venice, CA and opened the Pacific Aeroplane and Supply Co., where he started construction of a six-passenger biplane known as the Pacific Hawk. Over a six-week period in 1920, Timm designed and built the C-1 racing monoplane, which would win the International Air Tournament in Los Angeles in 1921.

In July 1921, Timm traveled to Lincoln, Nebraska to test fly the new Lincoln Standard L.S.5 where he met Charles Lindbergh. In February 1922, Lindbergh had enrolled as a student at the Nebraska Aircraft Corporation's flying school and flew for the first time on April 9, 1922, when he took to the air as a passenger in a two-seat Lincoln Standard "Tourabout" biplane piloted by Timm. Later, on April 16 and 17, Lindbergh, as a student pilot, had two more flights with Timm. The two remained friends, and when Timm built another Curtiss Pusher for film use in 1925, Lindbergh later bought it and stunt-flew it during the 1928 International Air Tournament. He built another one-off design in 1926, the two-place monoplane Collegiate.

In 1922, Timm founded the O.W. Timm Aircraft Company in Glendale, California. In 1928 the name was changed to the Timm Airplane Co. The company's first design was the Timm Collegiate series of five parasol-winged, twin-seat light aircraft. In California he also produced a large (for the era) passenger biplane, the Timm Coach with an enclosed cabin seating seven and an open cockpit for two pilots. Timm changed the name to Timm Aircraft Company in May 1934, and introduced the Timm T-S140, a high-wing monoplane twin-engine design.

In World War II, Timm built planes for both the Army and the Navy, including hundreds of trainers and CG-4 assault gliders. The assault gliders were used to land troops on D-Day.

In 1965, Timm was contacted by the TallMantz company to design a "one-off" movie model called the Tallmantz Phoenix P-1 which had a short and tragic lifespan, being involved in the death of its pilot, Paul Mantz.

Timm died on June 29, 1978, two months to the day after his younger brother Wally.
