= Alexander Flyabout D =

1931 aircraft by Alexander Airplane Company

Flyabout D

General information
- Type: Light Monoplane
- National origin: United States
- Manufacturer: Alexander Aircraft Company, Aircraft Mechanics, Inc.
- Designer: Proctor Nichols

History
- Introduction date: 1931 Detroit Air Show

The Alexander Airplane Company D-1 Flyabout was an early entry into the light aircraft market by the popular biplane aircraft manufacturer. The aircraft was later manufactured by Aircraft Mechanics, Inc.

== Design ==
The D-1 was a conventional landing geared high winged monoplane with side-by-side seating powered by a 35 hp (26 kW) Continental engine, with a firewall-mounted fuel tank. The cabin featured doors on both sides of the aircraft. It was the first aircraft certified under new CAA rules for aircraft under 1,000 lb (454 kg).

== Operational history ==
The prototype's capabilities were demonstrated by flying up to 15,000 ft (4,572 m) above Pikes Peak with the 38 hp (28 kW) model. Test pilot Proctor Nichols later reported having flown through a tornado formation in the demonstrator returning from the Cleveland National Air Races.

== Variants ==
D-1
First outfitted with a 35 hp (26 kW) Continental engine.
D-2
Improved model with Szekely engine.

== Specifications (Flyabout D-1) ==
Data from Popular Aviation

General characteristics

- Capacity: 2
- Length: 21 ft 4 in (6.50 m)
- Wingspan: 37 ft 2 in (11.33 m)
- Height: 5 ft 8 in (1.73 m)
- Empty weight: 536.5 lb (243 kg)
- Fuel capacity: 8 U.S. gallons (30 L; 6.7 imp gal)
- Powerplant: 1 × continental horizontally opposed piston, 35 hp (26 kW)

Performance

- Maximum speed: 74 kn (85 mph, 137 km/h)
- Cruise speed: 65 kn (75 mph, 121 km/h)
- Stall speed: 30 kn (34 mph, 55 km/h)
- Range: 152 nmi (175 mi, 282 km)
- Rate of climb: 650 ft/min (3.3 m/s)

== See also ==
Aircraft of comparable role, configuration, and era

- Monocoupe 90
