= Christopher AG-1 =

AG-1

General information
- Type: Assault glider
- National origin: United States
- Manufacturer: Christopher Company
- Status: Project cancelled
- Number built: None

The Christopher AG-1 was a proposed Second World War American assault glider. Part of a United States Army assault glider project, none was built and the programme was cancelled in September 1943.

== Design and development ==
The United States Army had an idea to procure an assault glider, an armed glider that would land first and help secure the landing site for the use by transport gliders. Each assault glider would have six glidermen as well as the pilot and co-pilot, the glidermen would be armed with two .50 and two .30 calibre machine guns and two rocket launchers. Contracts were awarded in May 1943 to two companies, the Christopher Company and the Timm Aircraft Company, each to build two prototypes. The Christopher prototype was designated the XAG-1 and was to have been a low-wing cantilever monoplane with a gross weight of 8500lb, the company delivered a wind tunnel model to the Army. General Chidlaw in the Office of the Assistant Chief of Air Staff decided that it was damned fool idea and cancelled the project in September 1943.

== Specifications ==
Data from Mrazek

General characteristics

- Crew: 2 (pilot, co-pilot)
- Capacity: 6 glidermen
- Gross weight: 8,500 lb (3,856 kg)

Performance

- Cruise speed: 240 mph (390 km/h, 210 kn) while being towed

== See also ==
- Military gliders

Aircraft of comparable role, configuration, and era

- Timm AG-2
