= Timm Aircoach =

Aircoach
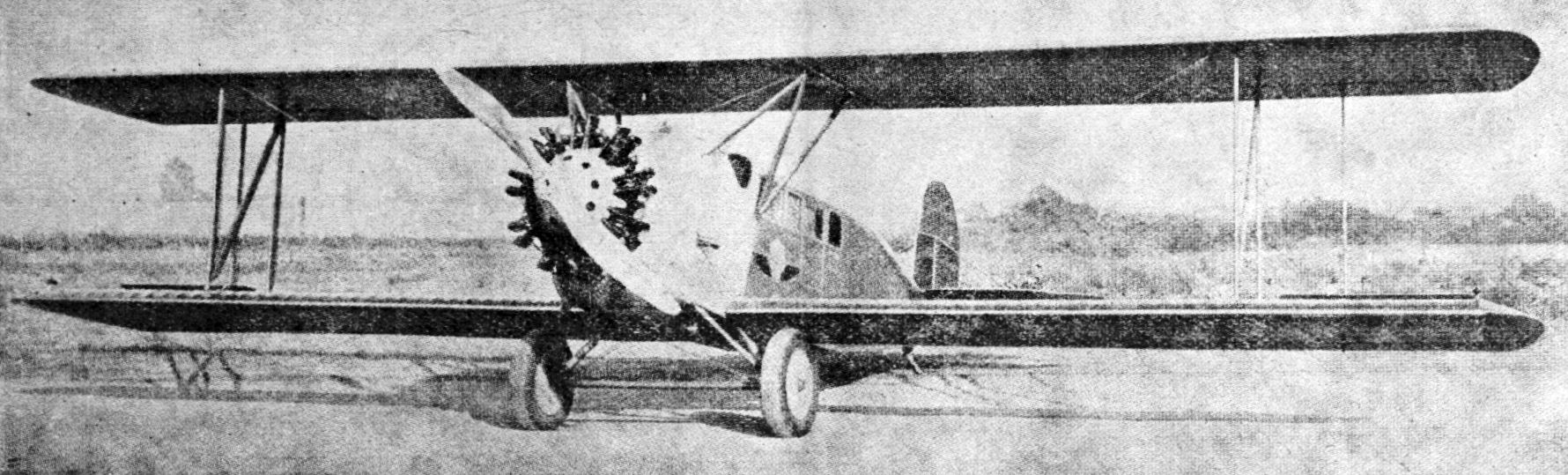

General information
- Type: Cabin biplane
- National origin: United States
- Manufacturer: O.W. Timm Aircraft Company
- Designer: Otto Timm
- Number built: 1

History
- Introduction date: September 1928

The Timm Aircoach, also called the Timm Coach and the Golden Shell Special, was a custom-built, high-capacity, high altitude aircraft for charter flights.

== Design and development ==
The Aircoach was built in a shop at Glendale Airport, where Otto and Wally Timm had a shop. Al Menasco had a shop nearby where he modified engines. The Aircoach used a Menaso modified Salmson engine.

The Aircoach was a single engine, conventional landing gear equipped biplane with an open cockpit for two pilots and enclosed passenger cabin. The fuselage was made of welded steel tubing with plywood covering.

== Operational history ==
Roscoe Turner flew the underpowered Shell Special Golden Shell twice, attempting endurance records. Each flight resulted in damage and the efforts were abandoned.

== Specifications (Aircoach) ==
Data from Jane's all the World's Aircraft 1928, Aerofiles:Timm

General characteristics

- Crew: 2
- Capacity: 5 pax
- Length: 31 ft 9 in (9.67 m)
- Wingspan: 45 ft 0 in (13.71 m)
- Height: 11 ft 0 in (3.35 m)
- Fuel capacity: 70 US gal (58 imp gal; 260 L)
- Powerplant: 1 × Menasco-Salmson B-2 9-cylinder water-cooled radial piston engine, 260 hp (190 kW)
- Propellers: 2-bladed fixed pitch propeller

Performance

- Maximum speed: 97 kn (112 mph, 180 km/h)
- Landing speed: 35 mph (30 kn; 56 km/h)
- Cruise speed: 87 kn (100 mph, 160 km/h)
