= Timm Aircraft =

O.W. Timm Aircraft Company
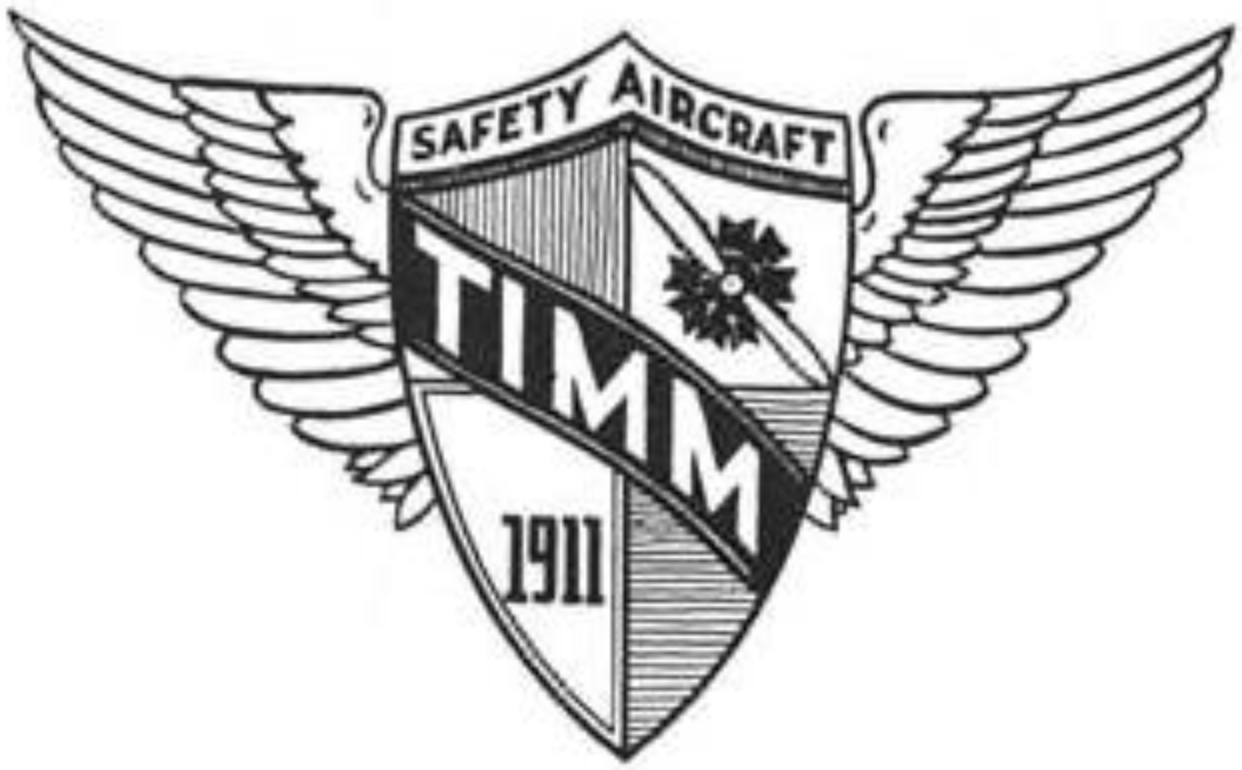
- Founded: 1922 in Glendale California
- Founders: Otto Timm; Wally Timm
- Defunct: 1957
- Fate: Merged with International Glass
- Headquarters: Van Nuys, California, United States
- Subsidiaries: Timm Industries, Inc

The O.W. Timm Aircraft Company was an American aircraft manufacturer founded by Otto William Timm, based in Los Angeles, California.

== History ==
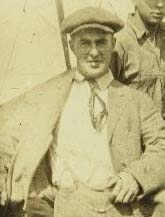
Otto William Timm c. 1920s

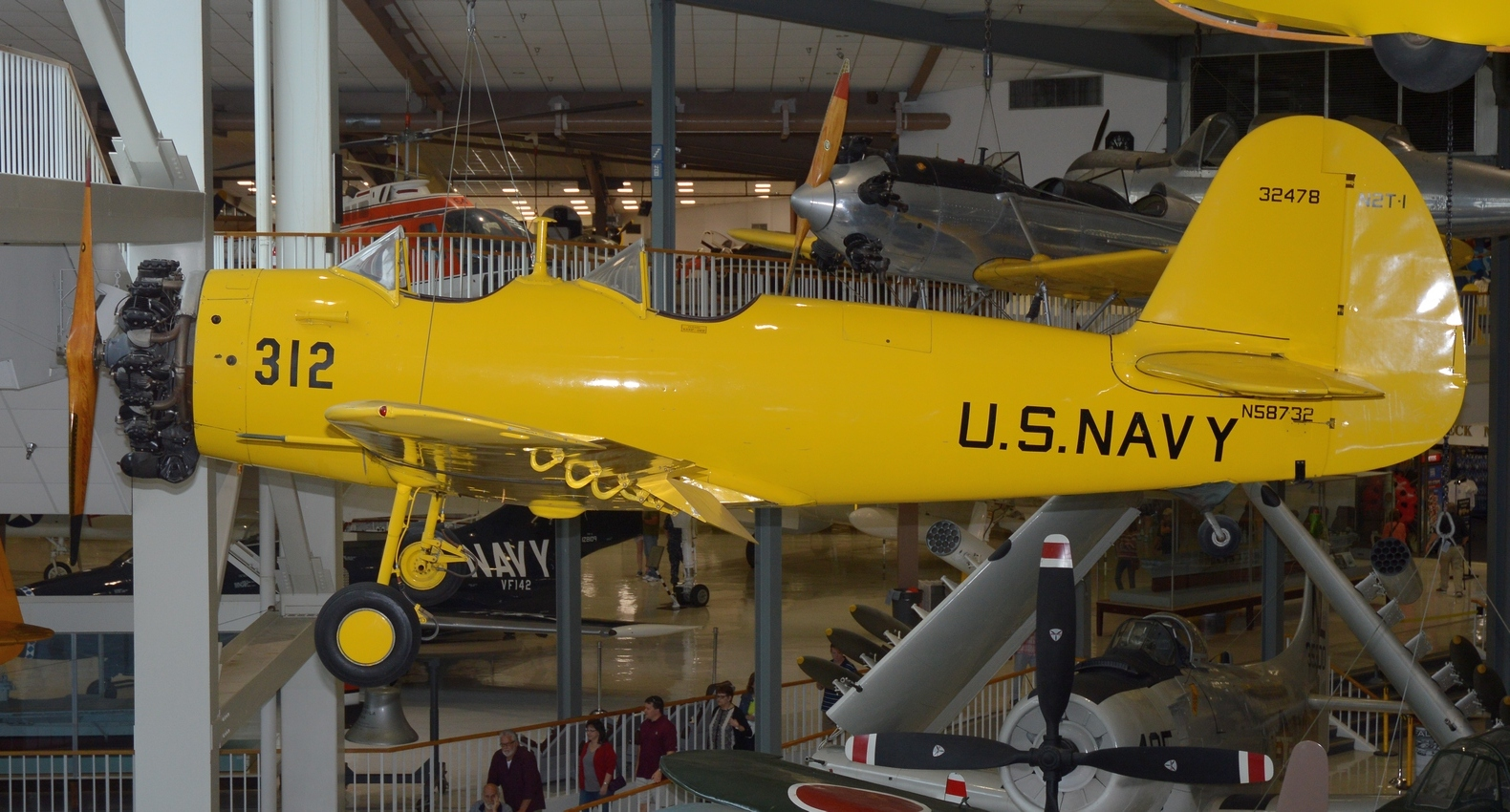
Timm N2T-1 Tutor at the National Naval Aviation Museum, NAS Pensacola

Between 1911 and 1922 O.W. Timm built several aircraft with varying success before he founded, in 1922, the O.W. Timm Aircraft Company. Timm manufactured six models of a parasol design, the Collegiate. In 1934 Otto and his brother Wally Timm joined to form a new company named the Timm Airplane Company to produce the Timm T-S140, a high wing twin engine aircraft using new features developed at NACA such as flaps and tricycle landing gear. Wally Timm formed his own Glendale based aviation company later on, the Wally Timm Inc.

The company developed a "plastic" material made of resin and wood similar to the Duramold process. The Duramold and Haskelite process was first developed in 1937. Followed by Gene Vidal's Weldwood and later the Aeromold process. The Aeromold process differs in that it is baked at a low 100 °F (38 °C) at cutting and forming, and 180 °F (82 °C) for fusing together sections after the resins are added.

In 1939, at the onset of World War II, the company operated as the Timm Aircraft Corporation, building the PT160K trainer prototype using the aeromold process. By 1941, the U.S. Navy ordered the aeromold N2T-1 with a production run reaching 260 aircraft along with other small aircraft parts made of the aeromold process. Profits increased to $70,000 from $240 the year prior. The company also license-built 436 of the CG-4A glider used by allied troops. A Plywood construction variant, the CG-4B was developed by Timm in case of material shortages, but did not go into production.

In some episodes of the 1941 movie serial, Sky Raiders, aircraft hangars of Timm Aircraft Corporation are clearly visible. They were located adjacent to the Van Nuys Airport in Van Nuys, Los Angeles.

After World War II, the company specialized in returning surplus Douglas C-47 aircraft back into airliner configurations. The company also created a subsidiary, Timm Industries, Inc to manufacture vending machines such as the Frank-O-Matic and Coca-Cola bottle dispensers.

By 1948, production had ceased to the point where the company leased out its production facilities to the Marquardt Corporation, a maker of Ramjet engines.

In 1953, a proxy war among shareholders was started, with C. D. Rudolph winning control of the board. The company did not produce any new aircraft after this point. In 1957, the company merged with the International Glass Corporation.

== Aircraft ==
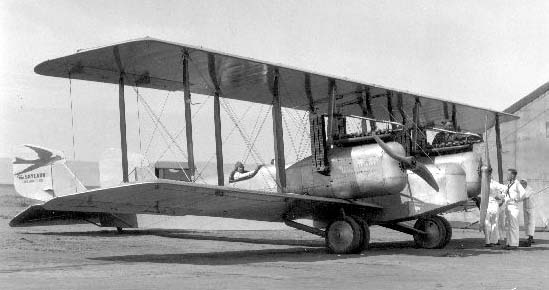
Timm Pacific Hawk

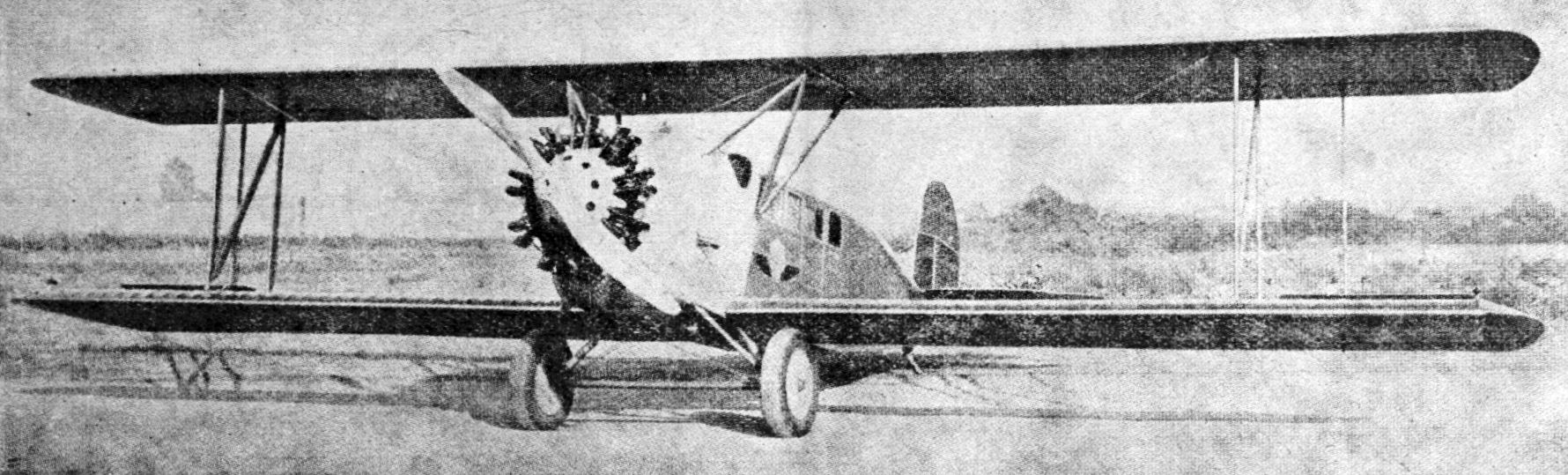
Timm Aircoach

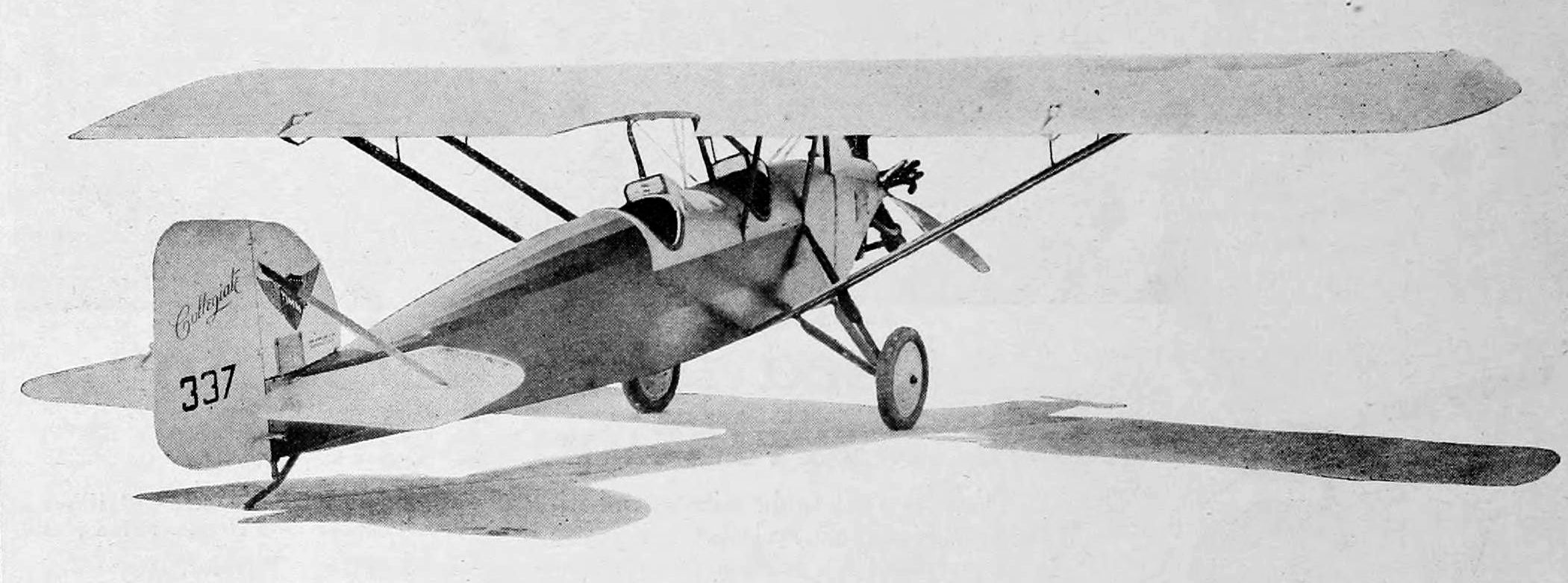
Timm K-100

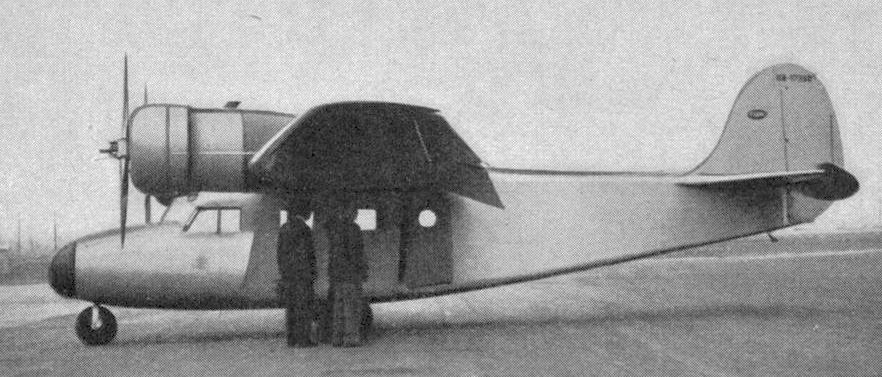
Timm T-840

Model name	First flight	Number built	Type
Timm Skylark	1923	1	Twin engine biplane transport
Timm Argonaut	1927	1	Single engine cabin biplane
Timm Curtiss Pusher replica	1927	2	Single engine biplane
Timm Aircoach	1928	1	Single engine cabin biplane
Timm Collegiate	1928	8	Single engine sport monoplane
Timm T-S140	1934	1	Twin engine monoplane transport
Timm 160	1937	4	Single engine sport monoplane
Timm Aerocraft 2AS	1938	1	Single engine monoplane trainer
Timm T-840	1938	1	Twin engine monoplane transport
Timm S-160	1940	1	Prototype single engine monoplane trainer
Timm PT-160-K	1941	1	Prototype single engine monoplane trainer
Timm PT-175-L	1941	1	Prototype single engine monoplane trainer
Timm PT-220-C	1941	1	Prototype single engine monoplane trainer
Timm N2T Tutor	1941	262	Single engine monoplane trainer
Timm AG-2	1940s	0	Unbuilt assault glider
Timm CG-4A	1942	434	License built assault glider
Timm CG-4B	1943	1	License built assault glider
Timm monoplane		1	
