= Timm N2T Tutor =

1940 naval trainer aircraft model by Timm

N2T Tutor
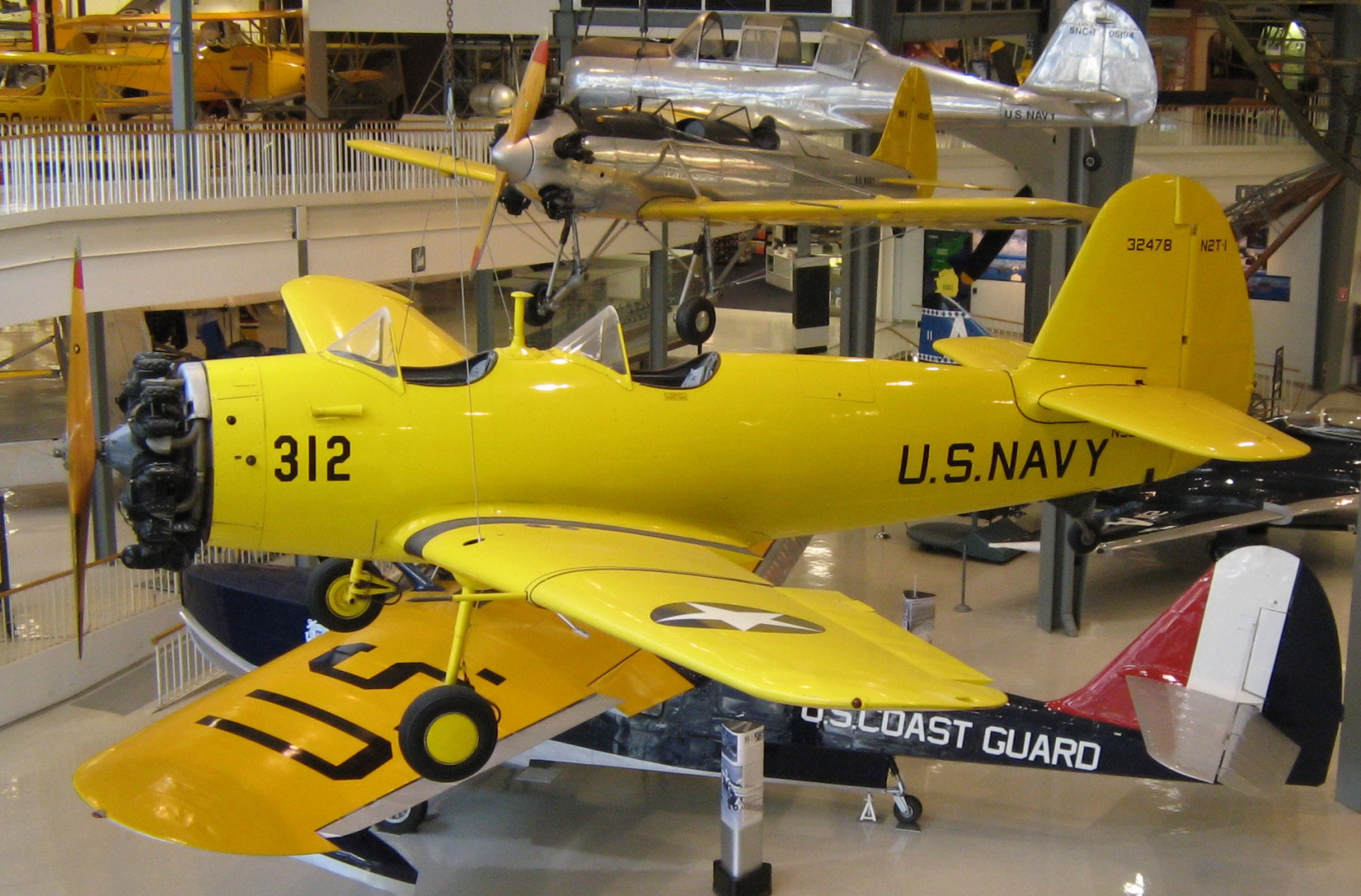
- Timm N2T-1 basic trainer of the US Navy at the National Museum of Naval Aviation at NAS Pensacola in 2007

General information
- Type: Training monoplane
- National origin: United States
- Manufacturer: Timm Aircraft
- Primary user: United States Navy
- Number built: 262 (N2T-1)

History
- First flight: 1940

The Timm N2T Tutor is an American training monoplane built by the Timm Aircraft Corporation for the United States Navy as the N2T-1.

== Design and development ==
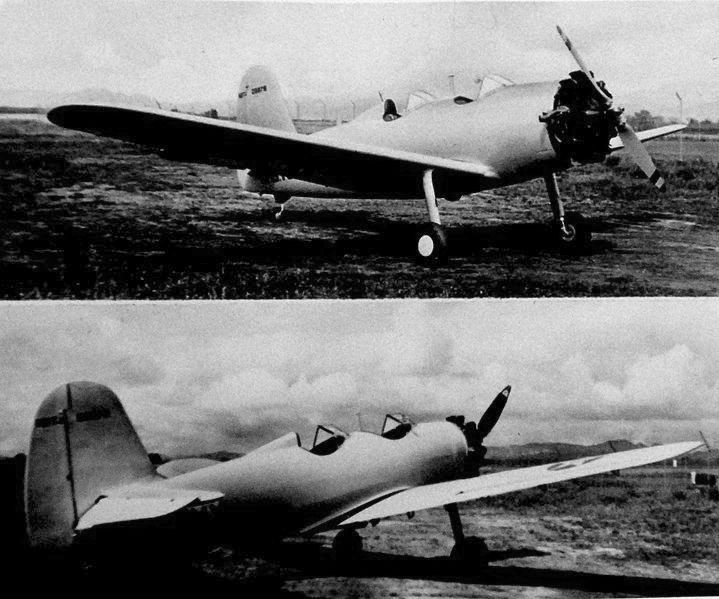
Timm S-160 during U.S. Navy testing

The Timm S-160 (or Timm PT-160K) was a conventional tandem open-cockpit monoplane trainer first flown on the 22 May 1940 by test pilot Vance Breese. It was powered by a Kinner R-5 radial engine and was a low-wing cantilever monoplane with a tailwheel landing gear. It had an unusual feature in that the airframe structure was made from resin impregnated and molded plywood, creating a composite material stronger and lighter than plywood. This process was patented as the Nuyon process and marketed as the aeromold process. The S-160 received the first approval for a plastic-wood construction, (ATC #747), on 28 August 1941.

The PT-175-K variant was fitted with a Kinner R-53 engine. This was followed by the PT-220-C with a 220 hp (164 kW) Continental W-670-6 engine and larger tail.

== Operational history ==
The PT-220C was evaluated by the United States Navy, which ordered 262 aircraft in 1943 as the N2T-1, incorporating only slight changes from the prototypes. The N2T-1 was a U.S. Navy basic trainer which the Navy nicknamed "Tiny Timm." The entire initial order was delivered in 1943 with no follow-on contract due to the military placing too many orders for Army and Navy trainers.

=== Postwar ===
Although popular and relatively reliable, the N2T-1 was not built for long-term use, especially being made almost entirely of a wood based composite material that proved to be susceptible to decomposing. Postwar, the N2T was sold to private owners and 10 remained on the U.S. civil aircraft register in 2001.

== Variants ==
PT-160-K
Version with a 160 hp (119 kW) Kinner R-5 engine.
PT-175-L
Version with a 175 hp (130 kW) Kinner R-53 engine.
PT-220-C
Version with a 220 hp (164 kW) Continental W-670-6 engine.
N2T-1
Production version of the PT-220C for the United States Navy, 262 built.

== Operators ==
United States

- United States Navy
- US private owners (postwar)

== Accidents ==
An N2T-1, tail number N56308, crashed during the Rocky Mountain Airshow at the Flagler Airport, Flagler, Colorado, on 15 September 1951, killing the pilot and 19 spectators. The Mississippi director of aviation banned airshows in the state that year as a result.

== Surviving aircraft ==
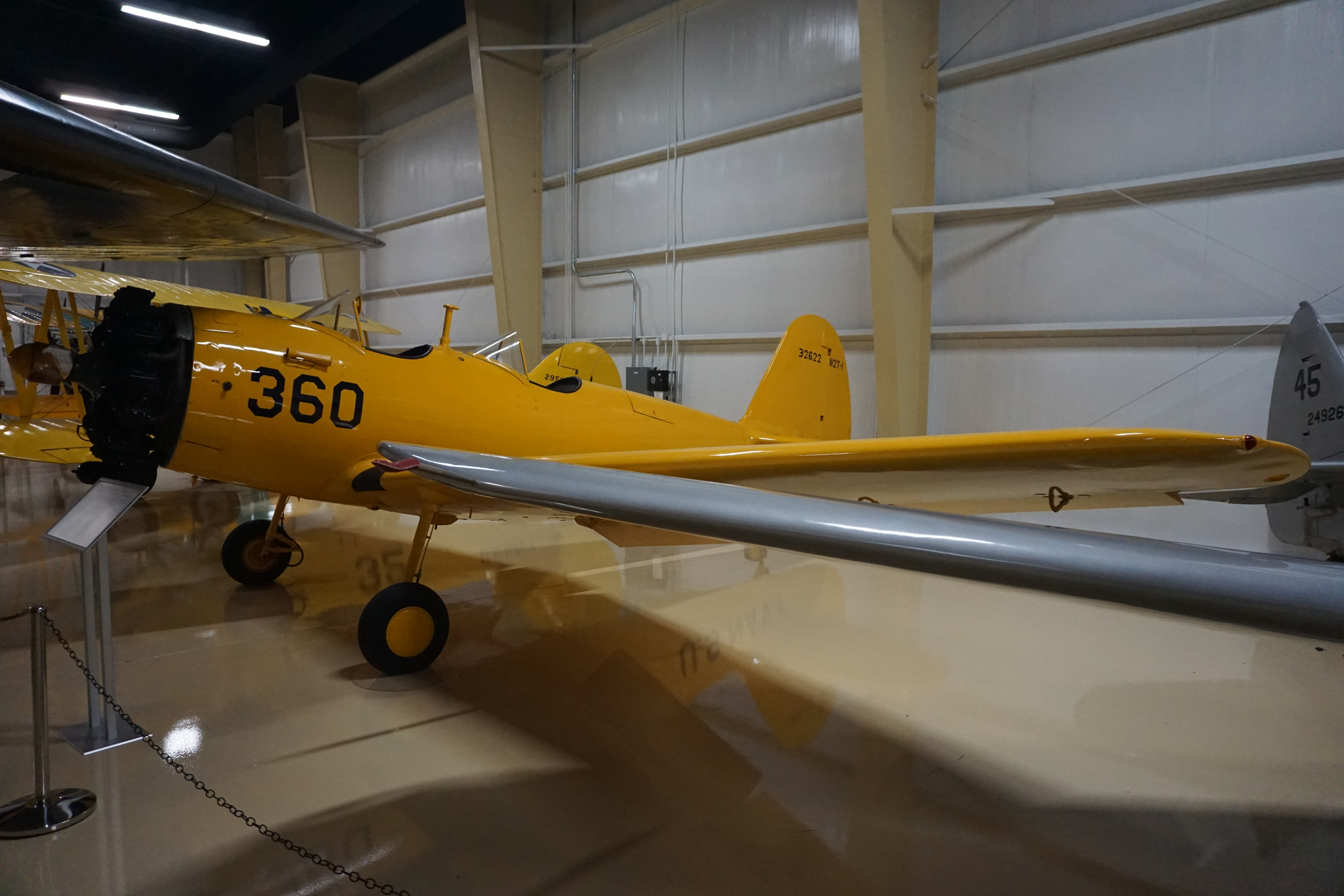
N2T-1 on display at the Air Zoo

N2Ts are preserved in U.S. museums, including examples at the National Museum of Naval Aviation at NAS Pensacola, Florida, and at the Air Zoo at Kalamazoo Municipal Airport, Michigan.

== Specifications (N2T-1) ==
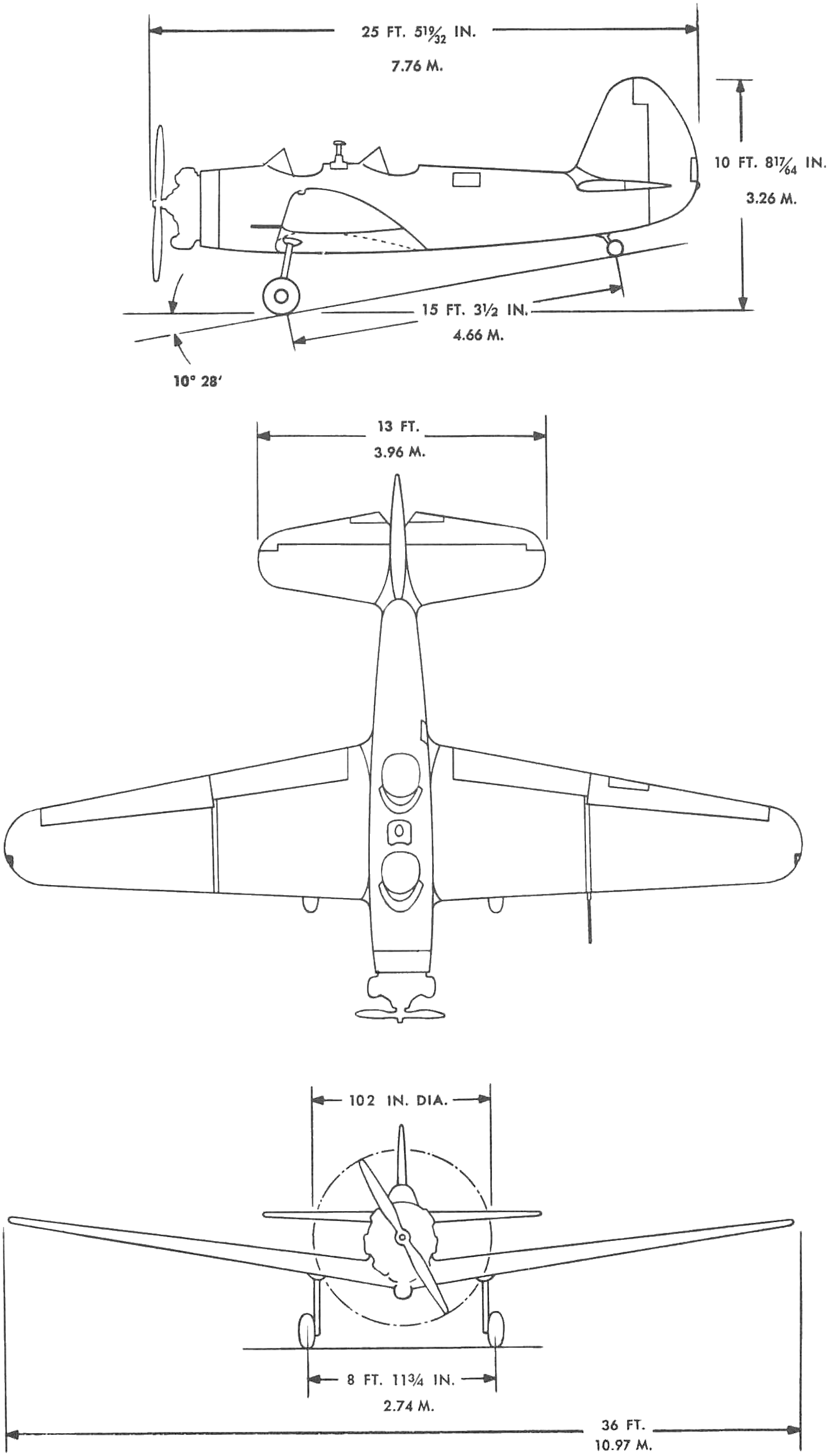
3-view line drawing of the Timm N2T-1 Tutor

Data from The Illustrated Encyclopedia of Aircraft

General characteristics

- Crew: Two
- Length: 24 ft 10 in (7.57 m)
- Wingspan: 36 ft 0 in (10.97 m)
- Height: 10 ft 8 in (3.25 m)
- Wing area: 185 sq ft (17.19 m^{2})
- Empty weight: 1,940 lb (880 kg)
- Gross weight: 2,725 lb (1,236 kg)
- Powerplant: 1 × Continental R-670-4 radial engine , 220 hp (164 kW)

Performance

- Maximum speed: 144 mph (232 km/h, 125 kn)
- Cruise speed: 124 mph (200 km/h, 108 kn)
- Range: 400 mi (640 km, 350 nmi)
- Service ceiling: 16,000 ft (4,877 m)
- Rate of climb: 900 ft/min (4.57 m/s)

== See also ==
Aircraft of comparable role, configuration, and era

- Naval Aircraft Factory XN5N
- North American NA-35

Related lists

- List of United States Navy aircraft designations (pre-1962)
