= Menasco-Salmson B-2 =

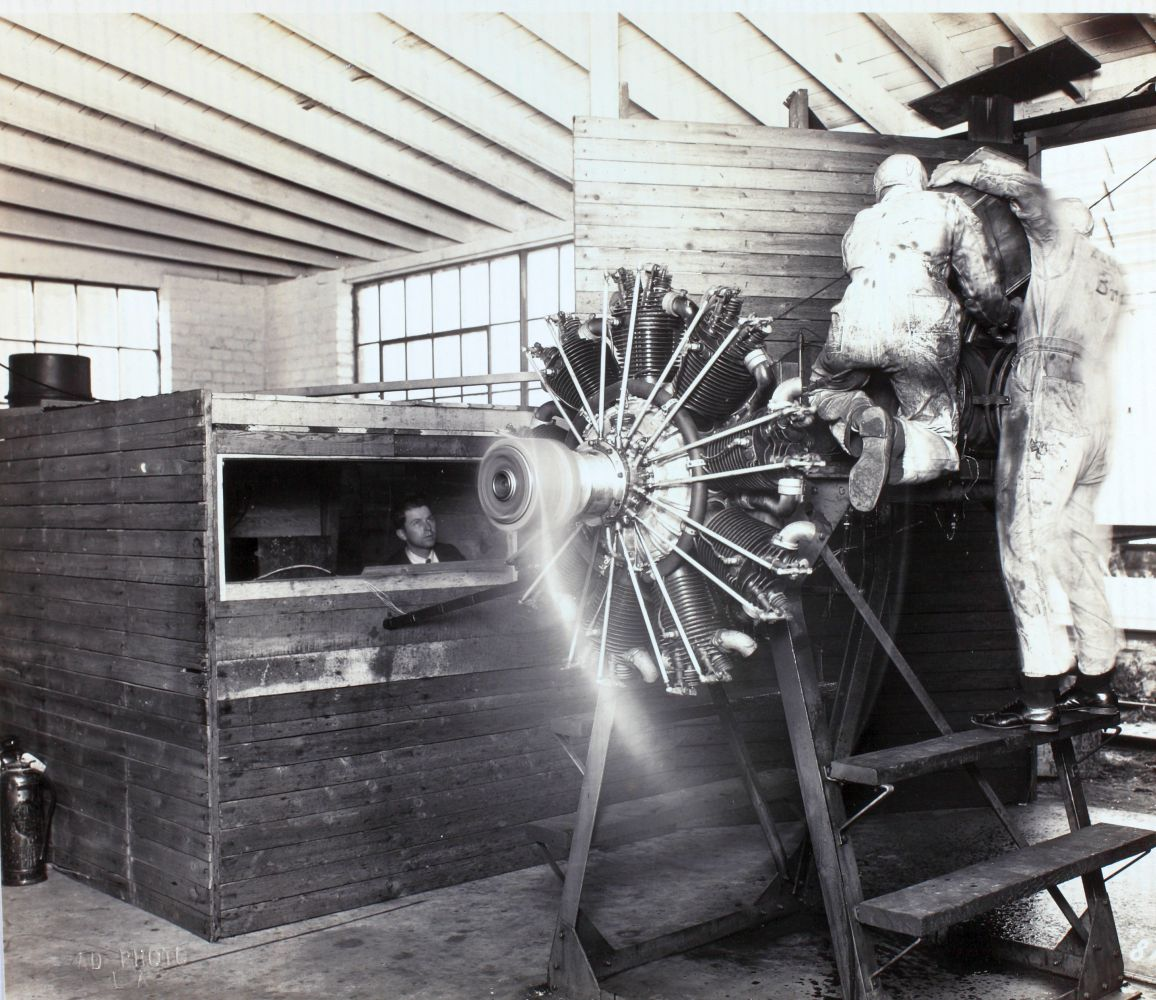
- A Menasco-Salmson B-2, running on a test stand.
- Developed from: Salmson Z9

The B-2 was a conversion of Salmson Z9 water-cooled aircraft engines to air cooling by Albert Menasco in the United States.

== Applications ==
- Timm Aircoach

== Specifications (B-2) ==
Data from Jane's all the World's Aircraft 1928

=== General characteristics ===
- Type: 9-cylinder air-cooled radial piston engine
- Bore: 4.92 in (125 mm)
- Stroke: 6.69 in (170 mm)
- Displacement: 1,144.8 cu in (18.760 L)
- Length: 38.5 in (980 mm)
- Diameter: 49.125 in (1,247.8 mm)
- Dry weight: 540 lb (240 kg)

=== Components ===
- Fuel system: one Zenith carburetor feeding mixture to cylinders via an annular plenum and radial pipes
- Fuel type: Aviation gasolene
- Oil system: worm driven double-plunger oil pump for pressure and scavenge
- Cooling system: water-cooled

=== Performance ===
- Power output: 250 hp (190 kW) at 1,500 rpm maximum continuus; 290 hp (220 kW) at 1,750 rpm maximum
- Fuel consumption: 12 gal/h (10.0 imp gal/h; 45 L/h) at 1,500 rpm
- Oil consumption: 0.25 gal/h (0.21 imp gal/h; 0.95 L/h)

== See also ==
Related lists

- List of aircraft engines
