= Timm Collegiate =

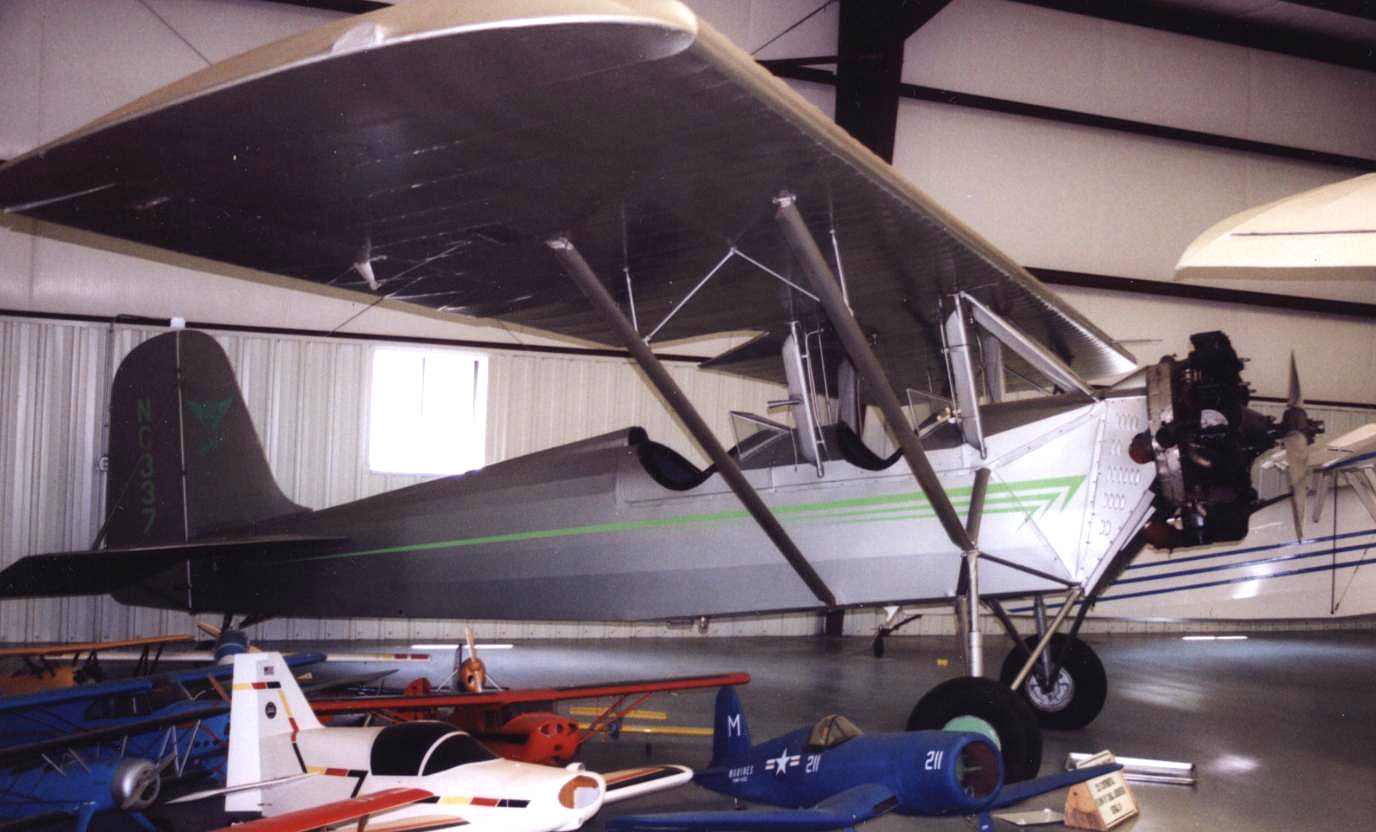
- Timm M-150 Collegiate NC337 on display in the Historic Aircraft Restoration Museum at Dauster Field, Creve Coeur, near St Louis Missouri in June 2006.

General information
- Type: light aircraft
- National origin: United States
- Manufacturer: Timm Airplane Co
- Designer: Otto Timm
- Status: 4 survivors, 2 airworthy (2009)
- Primary user: private owner pilots
- Number built: 6

History
- Introduction date: 1928
- First flight: 1928

The Timm Collegiate was a series of American-built two-seat light aircraft of the late 1920s.

== Design and development ==
Otto Timm founded the O.W. Timm Aircraft Corp in 1922 with its base at Glendale, California. The firm changed its name to the Timm Airplane Co in 1928. During 1928 Timm designed the Collegiate series of parasol-winged two-seat light aircraft fitted with fixed tailwheel undercarriage. The six examples built between 1928 and 1930 were powered by a variety of engines of between 90 hp (67 kW) and 185 hp (138 kW) During their lives, several were re-fitted with different powerplants.

== Operational history ==
During their operational lives, several of the six Collegiates were fitted with replacement powerplants, giving rise to new designation numbers. The aircraft served with private pilot owners both pre and post World War II. In 1930, the first Collegiate M-150 NC279V City of Los Angeles set an endurance record of 378 hours in flying the equivalent of 27,677 miles over Rosamond Dry Lake, California.

The FAA civil aircraft register recorded two surviving airworthy examples as at August 2009. One was operated by a private owner in California. The other NC337 was owned by Albert I. Stix and is on public display in the Historic Aircraft Restoration Museum (HARM) at Dauster Field, Creve Coeur, near St Louis Missouri. Two other examples are in long term storage in a private collection in Springfield, Oregon.

== Variants ==
(Source : Aerofiles and FAA Registry)

K-90
c/n 102 90 hp (67 kW) Anzani 10: NC887E stored in Oregon in 2009
K-100
c/n 101 100 hp (75 kW) Kinner K-5 NC337, later re-engined to a model C-165 with a 165 hp (123 kW) Comet 7-E. On display at HARM in 2009.
TW-120
c/n 106 120 hp (89 kW) to 130 hp (97 kW) Western L-7. NC945Y. No longer extant.
M-150
c/n 105 150 hp (112 kW) McClatchie Panther. NC279V privately owned in California in 2009. Two further examples later converted to this standard.
TC-165
c/n 101 C-165 re-engined with165 hp (123 kW) Continental A-70. NC337. On display at HARM in 2017.
TC-165
c/n 104 165 hp (123 kW) Continental A-70. NX16E. No longer extant.
C-165
c/n 101 K-100 re-engined with 165 hp (123 kW) Comet 7-E. Later re-engined with 150 h.p McClatchie Panther.
C-165
c/n 102 K-90 re-engined with 165 hp (123 kW) Comet 7-E.
C-170
c/n 103 170 hp (127 kW) Curtiss Challenger, later re-fitted with 185 hp (138 kW) Curtiss Challenger. NC888E stored in Oregon in 2009.
C-185
c/n 103 185 hp (138 kW) Curtiss Challenger, NC888E modified from C-170.

== Specifications (M-100) ==
Data from Aerofiles

General characteristics

- Crew: 1
- Capacity: 1 passenger
- Length: 24 ft 7 in (7.49 m)
- Wingspan: 35 ft 0 in (10.67 m)
- Useful lift: 643 lb (292 kg)
- Powerplant: 1 × Kinner K-5 5-cylinder radial , 100 hp (75 kW)

Performance

- Maximum speed: 108 mph (174 km/h, 94 kn)
- Cruise speed: 92 mph (148 km/h, 80 kn)
- Stall speed: 35 mph (56 km/h, 30 kn)
- Range: 600 mi (965 km, 520 nmi)
