= Time Warp Spitfire Mk V =

American fighter replica

Spitfire Mk V

General information
- Type: Homebuilt aircraft
- National origin: United States
- Manufacturer: Time Warp Aircraft
- Status: Production completed
- Number built: Two

History
- Developed from: Supermarine Spitfire

The Time Warp Spitfire Mk V is an American homebuilt aircraft that was designed and produced by Time Warp Aircraft of Lakeland, Florida, introduced in 1996 at Sun 'n Fun. When it was available the aircraft was supplied as a kit for amateur construction.

The aircraft is a 60% scale version of the Second World War British Supermarine Spitfire.

== Design and development ==
The Spitfire Mk V features a cantilever low-wing, a single-seat enclosed cockpit under a bubble canopy, conventional landing gear and a single engine in tractor configuration.

The aircraft is made from wood and composites. Its 23.00 ft (7.0 m) span wing, mounts flaps and has a wing area of 81.66 sq ft (7.586 m^{2}). The standard engine used is the 100 hp (75 kW) Geo Storm 1.6 liter liquid-cooled automotive conversion powerplant.

The Spitfire Mk V has a typical empty weight of 699 lb (317 kg) and a gross weight of 1,100 lb (500 kg), giving a useful load of 500 lb (230 kg). With full fuel of 27 U.S. gallons (100 L; 22 imp gal) the payload for the pilot and baggage is 338 lb (153 kg).

The manufacturer estimated the construction time from the supplied kit as 600 hours.

== Operational history ==
By 1998 the company reported that one aircraft had been completed and was flying.

In March 2014 two examples were registered in the United States with the Federal Aviation Administration.

== Specifications (Spitfire Mk V, estimated) ==
Data from AeroCrafter and LightPlanes.org

General characteristics

- Crew: one
- Length: 18 ft 5 in (5.61 m)
- Wingspan: 23 ft 0 in (7.01 m)
- Height: 5.75 ft (1.75 m)
- Wing area: 81.86 sq ft (7.605 m^{2})
- Empty weight: 600 lb (272 kg)
- Gross weight: 1,100 lb (499 kg)
- Fuel capacity: 27 U.S. gallons (100 L; 22 imp gal)
- Powerplant: 1 × Geo Storm four cylinder, liquid-cooled, four stroke automotive engine, 100 hp (75 kW)
- Propellers: 3-bladed fixed pitch

Performance

- Maximum speed: 200 mph (320 km/h, 170 kn)
- Cruise speed: 170 mph (270 km/h, 150 kn)
- Stall speed: 45 mph (72 km/h, 39 kn) flaps down
- Range: 850 mi (1,370 km, 740 nmi)
- Rate of climb: 1,500 ft/min (7.6 m/s)
- Wing loading: 13.4 lb/sq ft (65 kg/m^{2})
