= Alexander Film Company =

Advertising company based in Colorado, USA

- Industry: Advertising
- Founded: 1919 in Spokane, Washington
- Founders: J. Don; Don M. Alexander
- Defunct: 1974
- Products: Advertising

The Alexander Film Company was a Colorado-based advertising company notable for producing commercials and trailers on film in television and theaters.

The Alexander Film Company was founded in 1919 in Spokane, Washington and later based in Colorado Springs, Colorado. It produced films that were shown during the intermission at movie theaters. These films were a mixture of announcements and paid advertisements.

== History ==
The Alexander Film Company was once the world's largest producer of theater film advertising for a time during its earlier years. In today's movie theaters, theater film advertising is what is shown before the trailers which are shown before the featured film. While the Alexander Film Co. only made a whopping $2.50 in its first year, the use of advertisements in local movie theaters quickly gained acceptance from theater owners and businesses nationwide. The use of theater advertising grew so rapidly in the early twenties that Alexander Film Co. decided to relocate to a larger studio in Englewood, Colorado in 1923 and then again in 1928 to an even larger lot in Colorado Springs. Although Alexander received major success for a little while, it wasn't until the popularity of the Filmack Trailer Company, which would officially become the nation's largest producer of both theatrical and commercial film advertising by 1937.

By the early-1950s, Alexander produced an estimated 2,000 to 3,000 advertisement films a year and had a library covering over 8,200 different subjects. Alexander competed against other giant theater advertising companies, such as Filmack, National Screen Service, United Film Services, and Summit Screen Services, among others. In its heyday, Alexander Film Company's lot hosted 32 full-size motion picture sets, modern film, and audio laboratories, a sound recording department, an art department capable of creating cartoon animation, stop motion, backgrounds, and other special movie effects, an engineering department, and a full-service print shop. To run this massive complex, Alexander employed over 600 people locally and the annual payroll exceeded $2.5 million. A client list included a "who's who" of the nation's leading manufacturers including General Motors, Ford, U.S. Rubber, Philco, and Seven-Up. Regional offices were established in Dallas, New York, Chicago, San Francisco, and Los Angeles.

The late-1950s saw the remarkable collapse of Alexander Film Co. through the advent of television and the closing of many local theaters throughout the country. What dealt the most crippling blow, however, was that Alexander was a non-union shop which caused them to be "blacklisted" by industry professionals making it impossible for national advertisers to use Alexander-produced commercials. According to surviving employees, after the Alexander Film Company became unionized in the mid-1960s, the plant lost much of the spirit of family that had previously existed between the employees and management.
