= List of aircraft (Tr) =

This is a list of aircraft beginning with 'Tr'.

== Tr ==
=== Trago Mills ===
(Trago Mills Ltd (Aircraft Division))

- Trago Mills SAH-1

=== Trainair ===
(Trainair Mfg Co, 1610 Sutter St, San Francisco, CA)

- Trainair Arab Junior

=== Trans-Florida ===
(Trans-Florida Aviation Inc (pres: David Lindsay), Sarasota, FL)

- Trans-Florida Executive Mustang
- Trans-Florida Cavalier 750
- Trans-Florida Cavalier 1200
- Trans-Florida Cavalier 1500
- Trans-Florida Cavalier 2000
- Trans-Florida Cavalier 2500

=== Transall ===
(International - Transport Allianz)

- Transall C-160

=== Transavia Corporation ===
- Transavia Airtruk
- Transavia Skyfarmer

=== Transcend ===
(Transcend Air)

- Transcend Air Vy 400

=== Transcendental ===
(Transcendental Aircraft Corp (founders: Mario A Guerrieri, Robert Lichten, former Piaseski personnel), Glen Riddle, PA and New Castle, DE)

- Transcendental 1-G
- Transcendental 2

=== Transland ===
(Transland Co, Torrance, CA)

- Transland Ag-2
- Transland HU-16B

=== Trautman ===
(Herbert Trautman)

- Trautman Road Air

=== Travel Air ===
(Travel Air Mfg Co (founders: Walter Beech, Clyde Cessna, Lloyd Stearman, Pres: Walter P Innes Jr), 471 W First St, Wichita, KS)

- Travel Air 4-D
- Travel Air 4-S
- Travel Air 4-P
- Travel Air 4-U
- Travel Air 6-B
- Travel Air 10-B
- Travel Air 10-D
- Travel Air 11
- Travel Air 12
- Travel Air 14
- Travel Air 16
- Travel Air 1000
- Travel Air 2000
- Travel Air 3000
- Travel Air 4000
- Travel Air 5000
- Travel Air 6000
- Travel Air 7000
- Travel Air 8000
- Travel Air 9000
- Travel Air 11000
- Travel Air A
- Travel Air A-4E
- Travel Air D-4-D
- Travel Air Type R Mystery Ship
- Travel Air W-4-B
- Travel Air Z-4-D

=== Treadwell ===
(Walter L Treadwell, Walnut Creek, CA)

- Treadwell Alley Cat

=== Trébucien ===
(Jean Trébucien)

- Trébucien Sport

=== Trecker ===
(Trecker Aircraft Corp (Pres: F J Trecker), Milwaukee, WI)

- Trecker Gull

=== Trefethen ===
(Alfred Trefethen, Lomita, CA)

- Trefethen Sport-Aire II aka TT-1
- Trefethen TRW Special

=== Treffinger ===
(Edward Y Treffinger, Santa Monica, CA)

- Treffinger T-1-HD

=== Trek Aerospace ===
(Trek Aerospace Inc, Folsom, CA)

- Trek Aerospace Dragonfly

=== Trekking Parapentes ===
(Saint-Mathieu-de-Tréviers, France)

- Trekking B-Bus
- Trekking Carver
- Trekking Elise
- Trekking Just One
- Trekking K2
- Trekking Sebring
- Trekking Senso
- Trekking Sport
- Trekking Trek
- Trekking Xenos

=== Trella ===
( (Frank, Fred, George, Henry & Joe) Trella Aircraft, 1269 E Grand Blvd, Detroit, MI)

- Trella Speedster T-17
- Trella T-19
- Trella T-100
- Trella T-101 Speedster
- Trella T-102
- Trella T-103
- Trella T-104
- Trella T-105
- Trella T-106
- Trella T-107

=== Tremaine ===
(Pacific Aircraft Co (Fdr: William D Tremaine), Brea, CA)

- Tremaine Humming Bird
- Tremaine WT-2

=== Trendak ===
(Aviation Artur Trendak, Kolonia, Poland)

- Trendak Tercel
- Trendak Taurus
- Trendak Twistair
- Trendak T6
- Trendak Taifun

=== Trésy ===
- Trésy TG-01

=== Triavio ===
(Triavio SRL, Catania, Italy)

- Triavio Italo

=== Trio-Twister ===
(Eichwalde, Germany)

- Trio-Twister 103
- Trio-Twister 203

=== Tri-R ===
(Tri-R Technologies, Oxnard, CA)

- Tri-R Kis
- Tri-R TR-4 Cruiser

=== Tridair ===
(Tridair Helicopters Inc.)

- Tridair Gemini ST

=== Trident ===
(Trident Aircraft Corp (founders: Chuck Herbst, Percy Spencer) Vancouver, British Columbia, Canada)

- Trident TR-1 Trigull

=== TrikeBuggy ===
(TrikeBuggy Inc, Santa Barbara, CA)

- TrikeBuggy Delta

=== Trike Icaros ===
(Trike Icaros Industria Aeronautica Ltda, São Paulo, Brazil)

- Trike Icaros Adventure S

=== Trimmer ===
(Gilbert Trimmer, New York, NY)

- Trimmer Trimcraft

=== Trimouille ===
(Jean-Pierre Trimouille, France)

- Trimouille JT.IX
- Trimouille JT.X
- Trimouille JT.XI

=== Triton ===
(Triton Aircraft Co, Sausalito, CA)

- Triton Water Sprite

=== Trixy ===
(Trixy Aviation Products GmbH, Dornbirn, Austria)

- Trixy G 4-2 R
- Trixy Zero
- Trixy Trixformer
- Trixy Princess
- Trixy Liberty
- Trixy Spirit

=== Trommer-Michael ===
- Trommer-Michael T.M.4 Silbermöwe

=== Trotter ===
(Larry G Trotter, Auburn, WA)

- Trotter WSA-1

=== Troy ===
(Troy Air Service (George B Cluett II, Guy A Ham, Edward Pattison), Falmouth Airport, Hatchville, MA)

- Troy A

=== Troyer ===
(Kermit R Troyer, Comstock, MI)

- Troyer VX

=== True ===
(Roy True, Monroe, WI)

- True Sport

=== Truman ===
(John R Truman, Bandon, OR)

- Truman 33

=== Trump ===
(Frederick L Trump, Newcastle, DE)

- Trump Model 1

=== TRW ===
(Thompson Ramo Wooldridge Inc)

- TRW RQ-5 Hunter
