= Travel Air Model B =

American general-purpose biplane of the 1920s

Model B

General information
- Type: General-purpose biplane
- National origin: United States of America
- Manufacturer: Travel Air
- Designer: Lloyd Stearman
- Number built: over 183

History
- First flight: 1925
- Developed from: Travel Air Model A
- Developed into: Travel Air 2000; Travel Air 3000; Travel Air 4000; Travel Air 8000; Travel Air 9000; Travel Air 11

The Travel Air Model B was a general-purpose biplane produced in the United States in the mid-1920s. It was a development of the Travel Air Model A with relatively minor changes, and in turn provided the foundation for a range of other models produced by Travel Air in large numbers throughout the rest of the decade.

== Design ==
Like the Model A, the Model B was an unequal-span, single-bay, staggered biplane of conventional design. The passengers and pilot sat in tandem, open cockpits. It had a conventional tail, and fixed, tailskid undercarriage. The most prominent difference from the Model A was that the Model B's main undercarriage units were divided, unlike the Model A's, which had a through-axle.

Power was provided by a nose-mounted piston engine, driving a tractor propeller. The standard engine was a Curtiss OX-5, but Model Bs were produced with Hispano-Suiza 8A and Wright J-4 engines as the Model BH and Model BW respectively. A single high-performance example was built as the Model B6C, otherwise known as the Travel Air Special, powered by a Curtiss C-6A. The Special had a variety of other refinements including a shortened wingspan, shortened fuselage, a small airfoil fitted between the main undercarriage units, a chin-mounted radiator that could be semi-retracted to reduce drag, the use of streamlined bracing wires, and the fairing in of various fittings. Although standard model Bs had room for two passengers in the forward cockpit, and the pilot's seat in the rear cockpit, the rear cockpit of the Special was designed to allow a passenger to sit side-by-side with the pilot. These modifications added 150 pounds (68 kg) to the aircraft's weight.

The fuselage was built from welded steel tube and the wings from wood. Both were covered in fabric.

== Development ==
Alongside regular production of customer orders, Travel Air designer Lloyd Stearman and engineer Mac Short proposed a "Speed Ship" as a demonstration aircraft to promote the company. Company president Walter Beech was initially hesitant to interrupt production of customer orders to allocate resources to the project, but eventually relented. Construction work on the demonstrator, later known as the Special began about July 25, 1925 and it first flew on August 30. The aircraft was finished with a gloss black fuselage, gloss bright gold wings, and nickel-colored struts.

In 1927, the United States Department of Commerce introduced national aircraft registration and certification. Travel Air continued development of the Model B under several new designations, depending on engine type. Differences between the Model B and its follow-on developments, the Travel Air 2000, 3000, and 4000, were sufficiently minimal that some Model Bs were later registered under the Type Certificates of the newer models.

== Operational history ==
Apart from their use as general-purpose aircraft by private operators, Model Bs participated in a number of significant events.

The Special made its debut at an air meet held at Tulsa, Oklahoma from August 30 through September 6, 1925, sponsored by the Tulsa Daily World newspaper. There, it won the 50-mile (80 km) speed dash event, completing the course in 29 minutes, 26.4 seconds.

Walter Beech flew the Special in the 1925 Ford National Reliability Air Tour, from September 28 to October 4, finishing with a perfect score.

In the following year's event, Beech flew a Model BW to win the competition. Travel Air chief test pilot Clarence Clarke flew a Model BH in the same event.

The Special ended its career converted to a mailplane with a Wright J-4 engine, flying with Pacific Air Transport. It was destroyed in a crash at Shasta Springs, California, on January 22, 1928.

== Variants ==
Model B
main production variant with 90-horsepower (67 kW) water-cooled Curtiss OX-5 engine, 162 built by 1927. Developed into the Travel Air 2000
Model B6C
also known as the Travel Air Special; demonstrator with 160-horsepower (120 kW) water-cooled Curtiss C-6 engine, 1 built 1925.
Model BH
variant with 150-horsepower (110 kW) water-cooled Hispano-Suiza 8A engine, 5 built by 1927. Developed into the Travel Air 3000
Model BW
variant with 200-horsepower (150 kW) air-cooled Wright J-4 engine, 16 built by 1927. Developed into the Travel Air 4000

== Specifications (Travel Air Special) ==
Data from "The Travel Air Special" 1926, p.60, except as noted

General characteristics

- Crew: one pilot
- Capacity: three passengers
- Length: 24 ft 1 in (7.34 m)
- Wingspan: 31 ft 6 in (9.60 m)
- Height: 8 ft 8 in (2.64 m)
- Wing area: 2,600 sq ft (240 m^{2})
- Empty weight: 1,460 lb (662 kg)
- Gross weight: 2,542 lb (1,153 kg)
- Powerplant: 1 × Curtiss C-6A six-cylinder, water-cooled, inline piston engine, 160 hp (120 kW)

Performance

- Maximum speed: 120 mph (190 km/h, 100 kn)
- Endurance: 5 hours

== Notes ==
=== Bibliography ===
- Juptner, Joseph P. (1962). U.S. Civil Aircraft Vol. 1 (ATC 1-100). Los Angeles: Aero Publishers.
- Pelletier, Alain J. (1995). Beech Aircraft and their Predecessors. London: Putnam Aeronautical.
- Phillips, Edward H. (1994). Travel Air: Wings over the Prairie. Eagan, Minnesota: Flying Books International.
- Taylor, Michael J. H. (1993). Jane's Encyclopedia of Aviation. London: Studio Editions.
- "The Travel Air Special". Flight. Vol. 18, no. 5. London: Flight. February 4, 1926. p. 60.
