= Rubye Berau =

Pilot and member of the Squadron of Death

Rubye Berau (1931-1977) was a pilot and member of "The Squadron of Death," (S.O.D.) an all-female group of student fliers based at Akron Airport in Ohio that performed in the 1930s. By 1934, the squadron would have 13 members who would always fly on the second Friday of each month, and, if possible, on a Friday the 13th. The squad's lucky number was 13, their insignia was a skull-and-crossbones, and their mascot was a black crow named "Soddie." They also wore helmets, goggles and white jumpsuits, and some stories recount that they even wore high heels while in the air.

Berau got her pilot's license in 1932 and owned a Travelair three-place open biplane, powered by a Wright G6 whirlwind, which was capable of 135 mph. The squad was also involved in parachuting, and Berau's main partner was Babe Smith. They would perform almost daily at the Akron air races, making over 200 jumps together.
