= Kelch Aviation Museum =

- Location within Wisconsin
- Established: 2016
- Location: Brodhead, Wisconsin
- Coordinates: 42.5951°N 89.3773°W
- Type: Aviation museum
- Founder: Alfred Kelch
- Executive director: Pat Weeden
- Collections Manager: Ami Eckard-Lee
- Curator: Hannah Shickles
- Website: www.kelchmuseum.org

The Kelch Aviation Museum is an aviation museum located at Brodhead Airport in Brodhead, Wisconsin focused on the Golden Age of Aviation.

== History ==
=== Background ===
The idea for the museum came from Alfred Kelch, the founder of Kelch Manufacturing and former president of the EAA Vintage Aircraft Association. Over the years, he had assembled a collection of a number of vintage aircraft at Broadhead Airport. After he and his wife, Lois, died in 2004 and 2009, respectively, a trust was formed to create a museum.

=== Establishment ===
Fundraising for the museum began in April 2016. A major financial donation in 2017 funded the construction of a new building. It broke ground on 19 July 2019 and opened three years later on 23 July 2021.

The museum announced plans to build a new atrium in January 2022.

== Facilities ==
The museum is located on 2.5 acres (0.010 km^{2}) at Broadhead Airport (FAA LID: C37), which was founded in 1946 by a returning B-24 pilot named Bill Earleywine.

The museum is made up of the 12,000 sq ft (1,100 m^{2}) Bill & Sue Knight Memorial Vintage Airplane and Automobile Hangar and the Kent Joranlien Memorial Fellowship Hall. An additional building, the Dick and Bobbie Wagner Atrium, is under construction.

The Wisconsin Aviation Hall of Fame, composed of 22,000 photographs and negatives and 10,000 books, is also part of the museum's collection.

== Exhibits ==
Exhibits at the museum includes Comet 7E, Curtiss OX-5 and Fairchild-Caminez engines. A recreation of Bernard Pietenpol's aircraft workshop is also on display. The museum also has a flight simulator.

== Collection ==
=== Aircraft ===
- American Eaglecraft B-31 Eaglet
- Butler Blackhawk
- Curtiss-Wright CW-12Q
- Curtiss-Wright CW-12W
- Fairchild 22 C7B – on loan
- Fleet 7
- Franklin Sport 90
- Monocoupe 70
- Pietenpol Air Camper
- Pietenpol Air Camper
- Rose Parakeet
- Russell Light Monoplane
- Stearman C3B
- Taylor E-2
- Texas Eaglecraft Eaglet
- Travel Air 4000
- Waco RNF
- Welch OW-8M

=== Ground vehicles ===
- Ford Model A
- Pirsch REO Firetruck – on loan

== Events ==
The Midwest Antique Airplane Club holds their annual Grassroots Fly-In at the airport. It also hosts an annual Pietenpol reunion.

== See also ==
- List of aviation museums
