= CW 14 =

CW 14 may refer to:

- Curtiss-Wright CW-14, aircraft produced in the United States in the late 1920s by the Travel Air Manufacturing Company
- WCWF, a CW-affiliated television station for the Fox River Valley area of Northeastern Wisconsin branded as CW14
