= Curtiss-Wright CW-14 Osprey =

American 1930s utility biplane

CW-14 Travel Air, Sportsman, Speedwing and Osprey
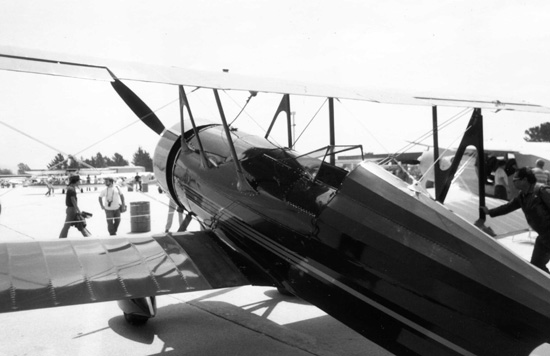

General information
- Type: Utility/training biplane
- National origin: United States
- Manufacturer: Curtiss-Wright
- Designer: Fred Landgraff
- Status: retired
- Primary user: Fuerza Aerea Nacional de Bolivia
- Number built: 38+

History
- Introduction date: 1931
- First flight: 1931
- Developed from: Rearwin Ken-Royce and Alexander Eaglerock

The Curtiss-Wright CW-14, named variously Travel Air, Sportsman, Speedwing and Osprey is an American 3-seat open cockpit single-bay biplane from the 1930s that was developed by Travel Air as a replacement for the highly successful Travel Air 4000. As a result of the Great Depression, which also limited sales, Travel Air merged into the Curtiss-Wright group of companies before production could start, so all examples were built by Curtiss-Wright. Its main claim to fame would be as the most numerous aircraft used in the Chaco war, where it formed the backbone of the Bolivian Air Force.

== Design and development ==
Previous Travel Air biplanes had been designed under the direction of Walter Beech, however the 14 was designed by Fred Landgraff, whose previous design experience included the Rearwin Ken-Royce and Alexander Eaglerock biplanes – to which the new design owed more than it did to the Travel Air 4000/4 it was intended to replace. The handling of the aircraft reflected this, and it was described as being "no Travel Air". One of the possible reasons for the difference in handling may be due to the airfoil chosen – previous Travel Air biplanes had used the Travel Air #1 airfoil section, while the CW-14 used the Navy N-9 section which was also used by the Beechcraft 17 Staggerwing, and the Vought UO, while the contemporary Curtiss-Wright CW-12 and CW-16 used a 15% Clark Y. Wings were built around four solid spruce spars, used single piece web ribs and were fitted with Frise ailerons on the top wing only, which provided good low speed control while helping counteract adverse yaw. A plywood walkway was provided at the wing root on both sides, and the wing root was faired into the fuselage with a metal fillet. The external push-pull tubes connecting the ailerons on the upper wing to the torque tube in the lower wing on the Travel Airs was dispensed with and the control lines were run inside the struts. The main 35 US gal (130 L) fuel tank was in the fuselage ahead of the passenger compartment, while a 23 US gal (87 L; 19 imp gal) header tank was in the center section of the top wing. The empennage was built up from welded steel tubing, with the fin being ground adjustable for trim, and the elevators could be trimmed in flight. The B-14R & C-14R had rounded elevators of slightly reduced area.

The cabane struts more closely resembled the "//\" of the Eaglerock than they did the "N" struts of the Travel Airs, as did the fuselage's internal structure. The fuselage was constructed of welded chromium-molybdenum alloy steel tubes forming a Pratt truss buried in the lower 3/5^{th} of the oval section fuselage, which was faired with formers and battens to a nearly ideal form. Again, unlike that of the Travel Air, no bracing wires were used, instead diagonal metal bracing kept it square. The front cockpit seated two, which unlike the Travel Air 4000, lacked the door on the left side and the corresponding dip in the left longeron. A metal cover was provided to fair over the front cockpit when not in use and dual controls were an available option at additional cost. Room for baggage was provided with a large compartment behind the pilot and a small bin in the dashboard of the front cockpit. The radial engine was enclosed in a NACA cowling to reduce drag. Only two types of engines were offered – the unreliable 185 hp (138 kW) Curtiss R-600 Challenger, which was to be used only in the prototype, and several variants of the Wright Whirlwind family, ranging from 240 to 420 hp (180 to 310 kW). The militarized C-14R had a large cutout in the trailing edge of the upper wing, redesigned cabane struts and it had the cockpit shifted forward to allow room for a gunner behind the pilot.

All surfaces aside from the aluminum panels on the top of the forward fuselage were covered in doped aircraft grade fabric.

The split axle undercarriage used oleo-pneumatic shock absorber struts, dispensing with the bungee cords used on previous Travel Airs. It rode on 8.00 x 10 low pressure tires and was equipped with brakes. Both tailwheels and tailskids were used. A spate of accidents in Bolivia, and the resulting complaints resulted in a redesigned, taller tailskid for the Bolivian examples.

The Bolivian military examples were fitted with bomb racks which were cleared to carry up to 250 lb (110 kg) of bombs. These aircraft were also armed with a fixed forward firing synchronized .30 in (7.62 mm) machine gun provided with 500 rounds of ammunition, while the observer/gunner was provided with a flexible .30 in (7.62 mm) machine gun that could be moved between 7 different positions, although for bombing missions, the gunner was often left behind.

== Operational history ==
Although intended as a replacement for the Travel Air 4000, the era of the three seat open cockpit biplane was ending, and the Great Depression was further dampening any sales prospects. The only significant civilian sale was to the Union Oil Company, whose order of two A-14Ds (msn 2006, NC12307 & 2007, NC12310) were only to replace their well-used Travel Air 4000s.

A single B-14B (msn 2010, NC12332) was retained by the Curtiss Flying Service, who mainly used it as a sales demonstrator.

The predecessor to the FAA, the Bureau of Air Commerce operated a single B-14B (msn 2011, NS1A, NC1A), and another was converted from a B-14B into the sole B-14R (msn 2003, NC12311) as a racing aircraft.

The armed militarized C-14R Osprey variants sold better, however aside from Bolivia which received 20, all of the remaining operators, which were in Latin America, operated them only in twos and threes.

=== Chaco War ===
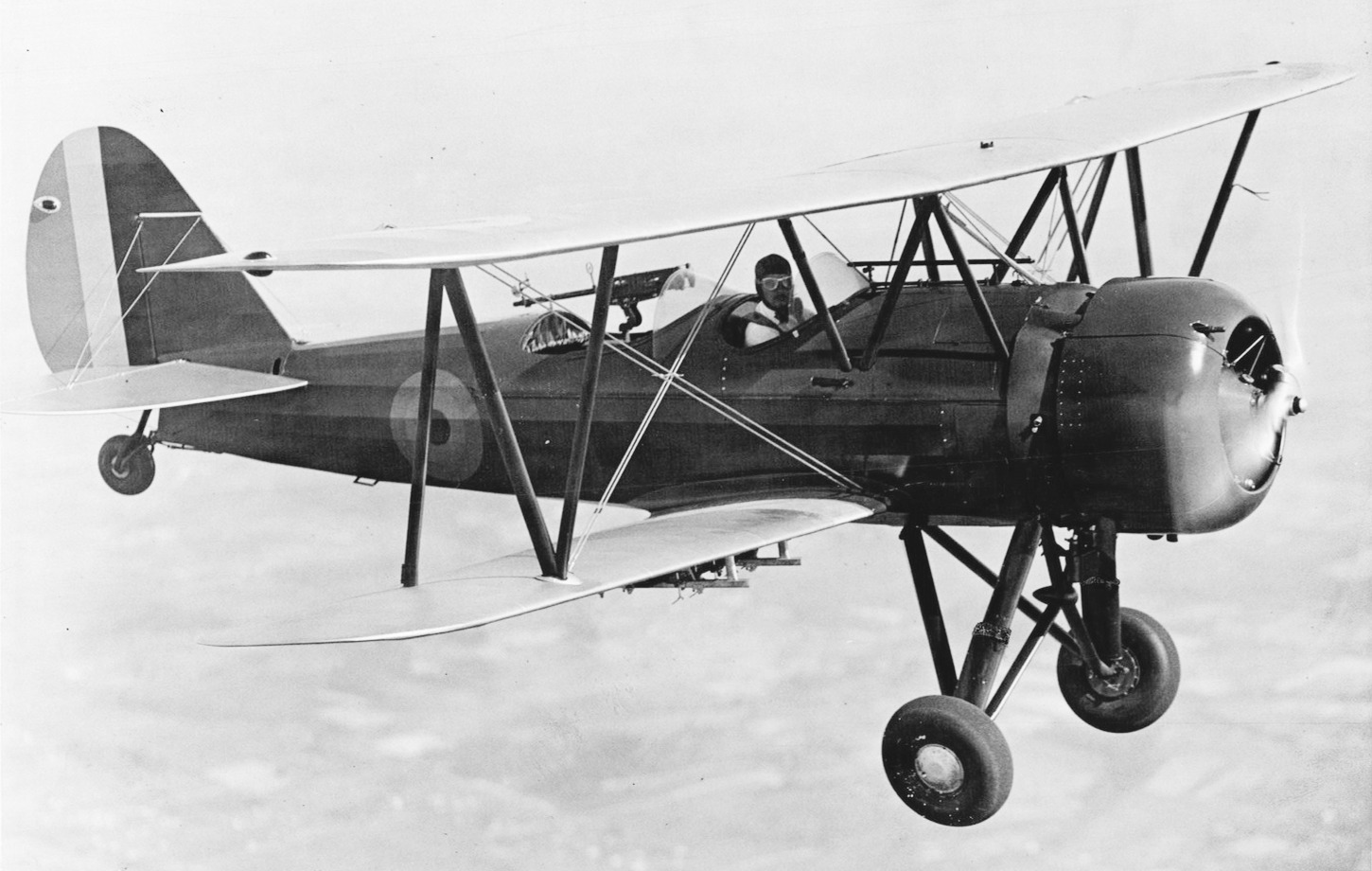
Curtiss-Wright CW-C-14R, mainstay of the Fuerza Aerea Nacional de Bolivia during the Chaco war, in flight

Although the Bolivian C-14R Ospreys were the most widely used aircraft on either side in Chaco war, additional airframes were anticipated but were never delivered. The Ospreys that were delivered to Bolivia arrived in three batches, of 12, 6 and 3 aircraft, with the last aircraft in the third batch being seized by Chilean customs officers due to an embargo imposed by the United States. This had the effect of also cancelling a fourth order of 6 aircraft. The eventual whereabouts of the seized aircraft is unknown. Random serial numbers were assigned to all but the first couple of aircraft, which were lost in accidents before numbers could be assigned. Shortly after the last examples had been made operational, The Air Force reorganized its aircraft into units that were named for their most important type – and so the Osprey escuadrilla was formed.

The first operational flight was made on 2 January 1933 during the Bolivian attack on Nanawa, where they attacked Paraguayan troop concentrations, while the first aircraft to be shot down, by ground fire, during the war was an Osprey on 25 February 1933. The first air to air kill of the war was made in a Osprey by Rafael Pabón over a Paraguayan Potez 25TOE, but he would in turn be killed when his Osprey was shot down in flames on 12 August 1934 near Fort Florida. The Bolivians would later name the Lieutenant Colonel Rafael Pabón Airport in his honor.

An attack by six Ospreys on Puerto Casado on 27 April 1933 triggered protests from the Argentine government – that were reiterated when a solo flight by single Osprey dropped homemade propaganda leaflets on Concepcion in Paraguay. Argentina was at that time maintaining a position of neutrality while supplying Paraguay with equipment, but would have posed a serious threat to the Bolivians had they declared war. As it was, despite pilots flying Ospreys providing ample warning of Paraguayan movements, Commander Hans Kundt's failure to act during the Campo Vía pocket resulted in the greatest military defeat suffered by Bolivia, crippling their defences, and hastening the end of the war, to Paraguay's benefit.

By the time of the armistice in June 1935, only three of the 20 were known to still be operational between accidents and combat losses. Two remained operational in January 1940, and a unfulfilled request was sent to the US authorities for spares in 1945. The last example was still shown on the books as late as 1954, albeit no longer airworthy.

== Variants ==
Data from Aerofiles, U.S. Civil Aircraft: Vol. 5, and Curtiss Aircraft 1907-1947

CW-14C Travel Air
1931 (ATC 2-357) prototype with 185 hp (138 kW) Curtiss R-600 Challenger radial engine. 1 built, later converted into an A-14D

CW-A-14D Sportsman Deluxe
1931 (ATC 442) 240 hp (180 kW) Wright J-6-7 Whirlwind radial engine

CW-B-14B Speedwing
1932 (ATC 485) with 330 hp (250 kW) Wright R-975E radial engine

CW-B-14D Speedwing
1 modified with 350 hp (260 kW) Wright R-975-E radial engine
CW-B-14R (Racer)
1 built as a racer for Casey Lambert with 420 hp (310 kW) Wright J-6-9 Whirlwind/SR-975 radial engine

CW-C-14B Osprey
1932 Military CW-B-14B with 300 hp (220 kW) Wright J-6-9 Whirlwind radial engine
CW-C-14R Osprey
420 hp (310 kW) Wright J-6-9 Whirlwind radial engine
CW-C-14B9
Alternate designation for C-14R

CW-17R
Fighter development of Osprey, probably unbuilt.

CW-18D
Unbuilt primary trainer development of Osprey with detail changes to be powered by Wright R-760E.

== Operators ==
=== Civil ===
United States

- Casey Lambert had a B-14R that had been converted into a racer from a B-14B.
- Bureau of Air Commerce operated one CW-B-14B
- Curtiss Flying Service operated one CW-B-14B that was converted into a B14D.
- Union Oil Company operated two CW-A-14Ds

=== Military ===
Argentina

- Servicio de Aviacion Militar operated one CW-A14D Speedwing in the 1930s

Bolivia

- Fuerza Aerea Nacional de Bolivia and Fuerza Aerea Boliviana operated 20 CW-C-14R/C-14B-9 Bolivian Ospreys from 15 December 1933 to 1954

Colombia

- Aviacion Militar operated at least three CW-14 Ospreys from December 1932 to 1939

Ecuador

- Fuerza Aerea del Ejercito Ecuatoriana operated two CW-14R Ospreys (sn 2014 & 2015) from August 1932 to 1936

El Salvador

- Fuerza Aerea Ejercito de Salvador operated three CW-14 Ospreys (sns 2033, 2034 & 2035) from August 1933 to 1942

Venezuela

- Sericio Aero Militar Venezolana operated two CW-14R Ospreys and one C-14B from August 1932 to 1938

== Surviving aircraft ==
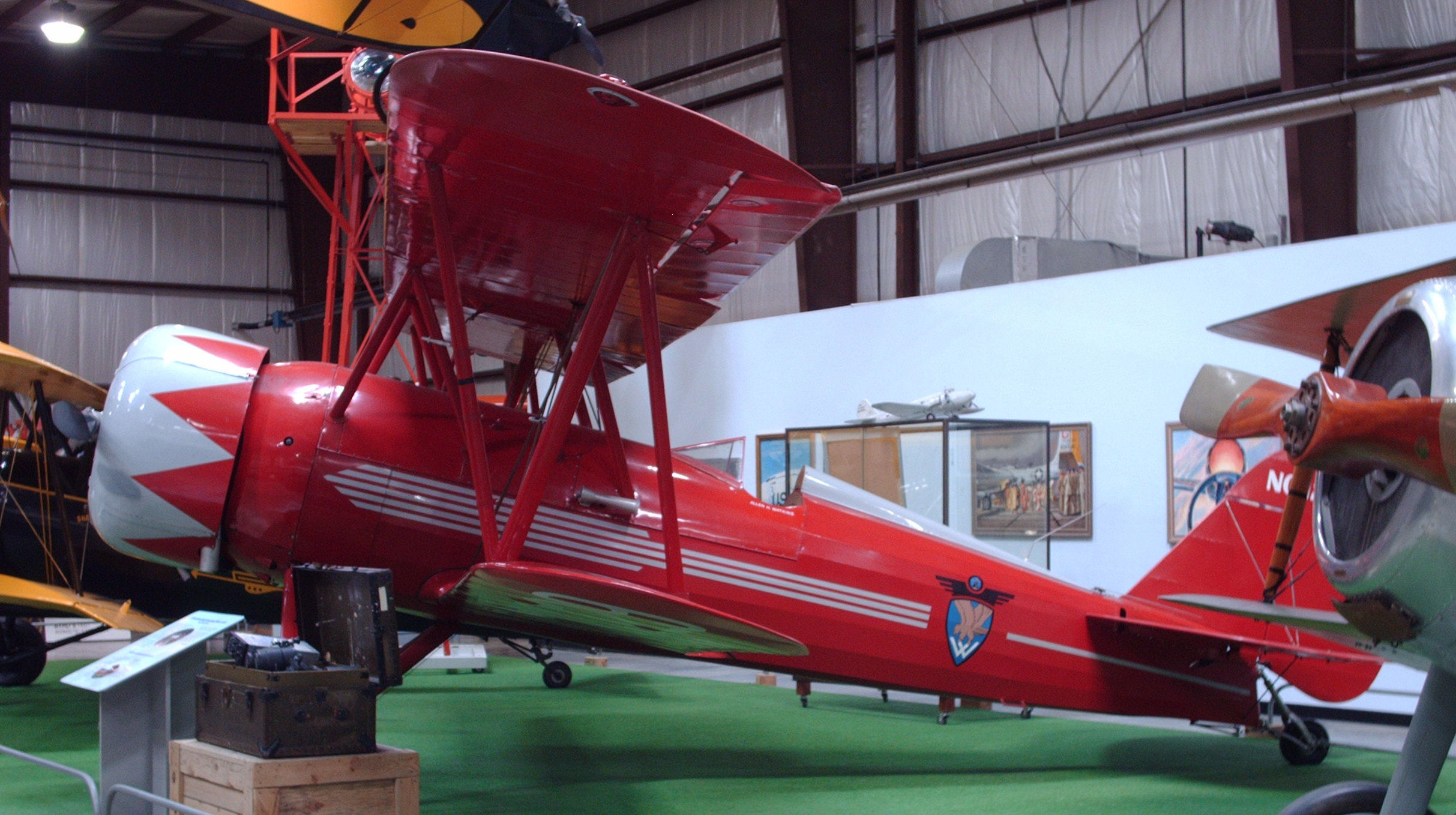
Curtiss-Wright CW-A-14-D NC12329 on display at the now defunct Virginia Aviation Museum

Four surviving examples are currently on the US civil register – fully half of those that were registered in the US, although not all are likely to be in airworthy, or even displayable condition. The sole displayed example is in storage following the demise of the Virginia Aviation Museum where it was displayed. None of the exported examples are known to have survived.

- msn 2003 (NC12311) 1931 B-14-R is registered in Poplar Grove, Illinois and had been restored to flying condition.
- msn 2008 (NC12323) 1931 A-14-D is registered in Fort Myers, Florida.
- msn 2009 (NC12329) A-14-D is registered in Atlanta, Georgia, and is currently in storage pending the creation of a new museum to house it, and the rest of the Virginia Aviation Museum collection.
- msn 2010 (NC12332) B-14-B is actively flying with the Ala Doble Flying Collection in Esparto California

== Specifications (Curtiss-Wright CW-B-14B Speedwing ATC # 485) ==
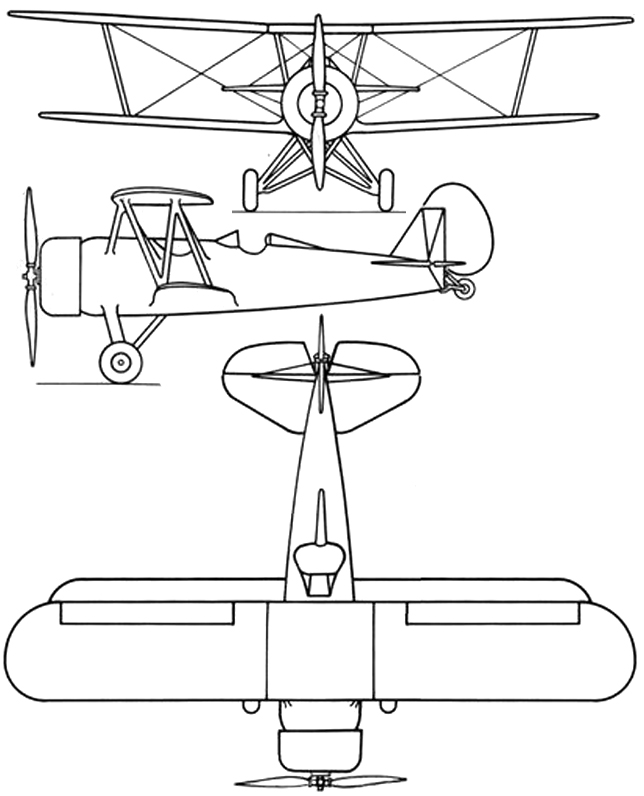
Curtiss-Wright CW-B-14R 3-view drawing

Data from U.S. Civil Aircraft: Vol. 5

General characteristics

- Crew: One
- Capacity: Two
- Length: 23 ft 2 in (7.06 m)
- Upper wingspan: 31 ft 0 in (9.45 m)
- Upper wing chord: 60 in (1.5 m)
- Upper wing dihedral: 3.0°
- Lower wingspan: 23 ft 7 in (7.19 m)
- Lower wing chord: 48 in (1.2 m)
- Lower wing dihedral: 3.0°
- Height: 9 ft 1 in (2.77 m)
- Wing area: 248 sq ft (23.0 m^{2})
- Airfoil: Navy N-9
- Empty weight: 2,008 lb (911 kg)
- Gross weight: 3,067 lb (1,391 kg)
- Useful load: 1,059 lb (480 kg)
- Fuel capacity: 66 US gal (250 L; 55 imp gal)
- Oil capacity: 5 US gal (19 L; 4.2 imp gal)
- Undercarriage track: 81 in (2.1 m)
- Powerplant: 1 × Wright R-975-E Whirlwind air-cooled radial engine, 300 hp (220 kW)
- Propellers: 2-bladed metal Hamilton-Standard fixed-pitch propeller

Performance

- Maximum speed: 177 mph (285 km/h, 154 kn)
- Cruise speed: 150 mph (240 km/h, 130 kn)
- Minimum control speed: 57 mph (92 km/h, 50 kn)
- Range: 575 mi (925 km, 500 nmi) at cruising speed
- Service ceiling: 18,700 ft (5,700 m)
- Rate of climb: 1,600 ft/min (8.1 m/s) for first minute from sea level
- Fuel consumption: 16 US gal (61 L; 13 imp gal)/hr at cruising speed

== See also ==
- 1931 in aviation

=== Related ===
- Curtiss-Wright CW-12 & 16

=== Aircraft of comparable role, configuration and era ===
- Boeing Model 203
- Bourdon/Viking Kittyhawk
- Stearman 4

=== Related lists ===
- List of attack aircraft
- List of civil aircraft
- List of Interwar military aircraft
