= Marvel Crosson =

American aviator (1900–1929)

- Crosson in the cockpit of a Ryan Brougham, ca. 1929
- Born: April 27, 1900; Warsaw, Indiana, US
- Died: August 19, 1929 (aged 29); Arizona, US
- Known for: Aviator

Marvel Crosson (April 27, 1900 – August 19, 1929) was a pioneer aviator, and the first female pilot to earn a commercial license in the Territory of Alaska. She worked in both California and Alaska and died in a crash during the first Women's Air Derby. She was inducted into the Alaska Women's Hall of Fame in 2011.

== Early life ==
She was born to Esler Crosson and his wife Elizabeth Wynant Crosson in Warsaw, Indiana, the hometown of Elizabeth Crosson. Her brother Joe was born in Minneapolis, Kansas, where the family lived on a ranch. Her sister Zelma was born later. The family relocated to Sterling, Colorado.

== Aviation career ==
In 1922, the Crosson family moved to San Diego, California. Marvel and Joe became fascinated with aviation and together bought their first airplane, a Curtiss N-9. Joe Crosson moved to the Territory of Alaska to take a job as a pilot. Marvel followed soon afterward and earned her commercial pilot's license there, the first woman in the territory to do so. She joined her brother in his business, piloting and keeping the equipment in working order. She helped her brother transport a monoplane from San Diego to New York for Hubert Wilkins. After working as a commercial pilot in Alaska, Marvel returned to California. She set an altitude record of 23,996 feet (7,314 m) on May 28, 1929, while piloting a Travel Air J-5.

== Death ==
Marvel Crosson died on August 19, 1929, when her Travel Air Model 11 airplane crashed in the Arizona desert on the second day of the Women's Air Derby that had begun in California. Her body was found several hundred feet from her plane. Crosson's parachute had been released, but was unopened, possibly indicating that she was too near the ground for it to work properly after being released. She was entombed at Greenwood Memorial Park in San Diego, California.

Race sponsor National Exchange Club held a nationwide moment of silence in all its clubs to commemorate Crosson's death. A vacant chair represented Crosson at a banquet for the Women's Air Derby in Cleveland, Ohio. She was inducted into the Alaska Women's Hall of Fame in 2011.

== See also ==
- Mount Crosson
