= Travel Air 3000 =

American general-purpose biplane of the 1920s

Model 3000

General information
- Type: General aviation
- National origin: United States
- Manufacturer: Travel Air
- Number built: around 30–50

History
- First flight: 1927
- Developed from: Travel Air Model B

The Travel Air 3000 is an American general-purpose biplane of the 1920s, a member of the family of aircraft that began with the Travel Air Model A. It was a direct development of the Travel Air Model BH. Around 30 to 50 were built, with some of these converted from other, related Travel Air types.

== Design and development ==
Like other members of this family, the Model 3000 is an unequal-span, single-bay, staggered biplane of conventional design. The passengers and pilot sit in tandem, open cockpits. It has a conventional tail, and fixed, tailskid undercarriage. The fuselage is built from welded steel tubes, and the wings from wood. Travel Air model numbers primarily reflected changes in powerplant, and the Model 3000 is powered by a Hispano-Suiza 8 V-8 engine mounted in the nose, driving a tractor propeller.

The Hispano-Suiza 8 (known as the "Hisso") was a highly-prized engine in its day, but very expensive to purchase and even moreso to operate and maintain. Travel Air had first fitted it to Model Bs in 1926, and for the Model 3000, customers had to supply their own engine. This could be the more usual 150-horsepower (110 kW) model 8A, or the high-compression 180-horsepower (130 kW) model 8E. (Note: Pelletier gives the designation of the high-power version of the engine as the "I", but the Model 8I was a Model 8A that incorporated some of the design refinements of the 8E but still only produced 150 hp.)

The installation varied somewhat, with some Model 3000s manufactured with closely-fitted, contoured engine cowlings, and others with simpler, uncontoured cowlings. Aircraft with the latter installation were dubbed "flat-nose" 3000s. The standard Model 3000 was fitted with large aerodynamic balances on its upper ailerons; Colloquially known as "elephant ears", these were a distinguishing feature of this family of Travel Air biplanes. Some Model 3000s, however, were fitted with Travel Air's "speed wing", which had a shorter span, thinner profile, and frise ailerons. These were designated Model D-3000.

Travel Air built four Model 3000s in 1927, with the rest of production continuing throughout 1928 and into 1929. The design received type certificate ATC-31 in March 1928, and some Model BHs were also registered under this type certificate. Two Model 3000s were re-manufactured as Model 9000s (construction numbers 420 and 421, registered C-4836 and C-4837).

== Operational history ==
In 1928 and 1929, Louise Thaden set three women's aeronautical world records in Travel Air biplanes, at least two of which were set flying the Model 3000, becoming the first and only pilot to hold simultaneously the women's altitude, airspreed, and solo endurance records. She set the altitude record at Oakland, California in Model 3000 construction number 515, registration 5426 (Note: Pelletier gives these construction and registration numbers, but Phillips captions a photograph of 5425 (construction number 514) as the aircraft used in the altitude record flight. However, Phillips also captions another photograph on the same page as being Thadden immediately after this flight, standing in front of a Travel Air with fuselage markings similar to, but different from, those in the photograph of 5425. This article follows Pelletier.) on December 7, 1928, reaching 20,260 feet (6,180 m). For the endurance record, her Model 3000 was equipped with additional fuel and oil tanks. The new fuel tank was mounted forward of the cockpit, faired with sheet metal, and fed the main fuel tank in the fuselage. Between March 16 and 17, 1929, she flew this aircraft for 22 hours, 3 minutes, and 28 seconds. For the speed record, her Travel Air was fitted with newly built "speedwings". Flying again at Oakland, she achieved 156 miles per hour (251 km/h; 136 kn) flying two passes of a 1-mile (1.6 km) course on April 18, 1929. However, sources differ whether she flew a Model 3000, or a Wright J-5-powered Travel Air.

Model 3000s were used for cross-country and pylon racing, and Douglas C. Warren, Travel Air distributor for the West Coast of the United States (and Thaden's employer) entered a Model 3000 in many races in that part of the country. They also were used in barnstorming and for movie production. In the latter role, they were sometimes used to represent the Fokker D.VII, to which Travel Airs bore a resemblance. Some Model 3000s were used in Men with Wings in 1938.

A Model 3000 (construction number 321, previously registered NC3947) is preserved at the Historic Aircraft Restoration Museum in Maryland Heights, Missouri. It remained on the FAA register until 2021.

== Variants ==
Model 3000
main production version, with Travel Air Model A-style wings
Model D-3000
variant with "speedwings"

== Specifications (Model 3000) ==
Data from Pelletier 1995, p.32

General characteristics

- Crew: 1 pilot
- Capacity: two passengers
- Length: 24 ft 2 in (7.37 m)
- Wingspan: 34 ft 8 in (10.57 m)
- Height: 8 ft 9 in (2.67 m)
- Wing area: 296 sq ft (27.5 m^{2})
- Empty weight: 1,664 lb (755 kg)
- Gross weight: 2,590 lb (1,175 kg)
- Powerplant: 1 × Hispano-Suiza 8 water-cooled, V-8 engine, 150 hp (110 kW)

Performance

- Maximum speed: 112 mph (180 km/h, 97 kn)
- Cruise speed: 100 mph (160 km/h, 87 kn)
- Range: 425 mi (684 km, 369 nmi)
- Service ceiling: 15,000 ft (4,600 m)
- Rate of climb: 800 ft/min (4.1 m/s)

== Notes ==
=== Bibliography ===
- "Aircraft Inquiry [3947]". Federal Aviation Administration.
- "Aircraft Inquiry [5425]". Federal Aviation Administration.
- Angle, Glenn D. (1921). Airplane Engine Encyclopedia. Dayton, Ohio: Otterbein.
- Juptner, Joseph P. (1962). U.S. Civil Aircraft Vol. 1 (ATC 1-100). Los Angeles: Aero Publishers.
- "Louise McPhetridge Thaden Collection, 1925-1949". Smithsonian Online Virtual Archives. Chantilly, Virginia: National Air and Space Museum Archives.
- "Museum Hangar 4". Historic Aircraft Restoration Museum. Maryland Heights, Missouri: Historic Aircraft Restoration Museum.
- Pelletier, Alain J. (1995). Beech Aircraft and their Predecessors. London: Putnam Aeronautical.
- Phillips, Edward H. (1994). Travel Air: Wings over the Prairie. Eagan, Minnesota: Flying Books International.
- Phillips, Edward H. (August 2015). "Walter's Wonder Women". King Air. Vol. 9, no. 8. Traverse City, Michigan: Village Press. pp. 22–27.
- Siebert, Rob (August 16, 2023). "Louise McPhetridge Thaden (1905–1979)". Encyclopedia of Arkansas. Little Rock, Arkansas: Encyclopedia of Arkansas.
- Taylor, Michael J. H. (1993). Jane's Encyclopedia of Aviation. London: Studio Editions.
