= Travel Air 4000 =

American general-purpose biplane of the 1920s

Model 4000
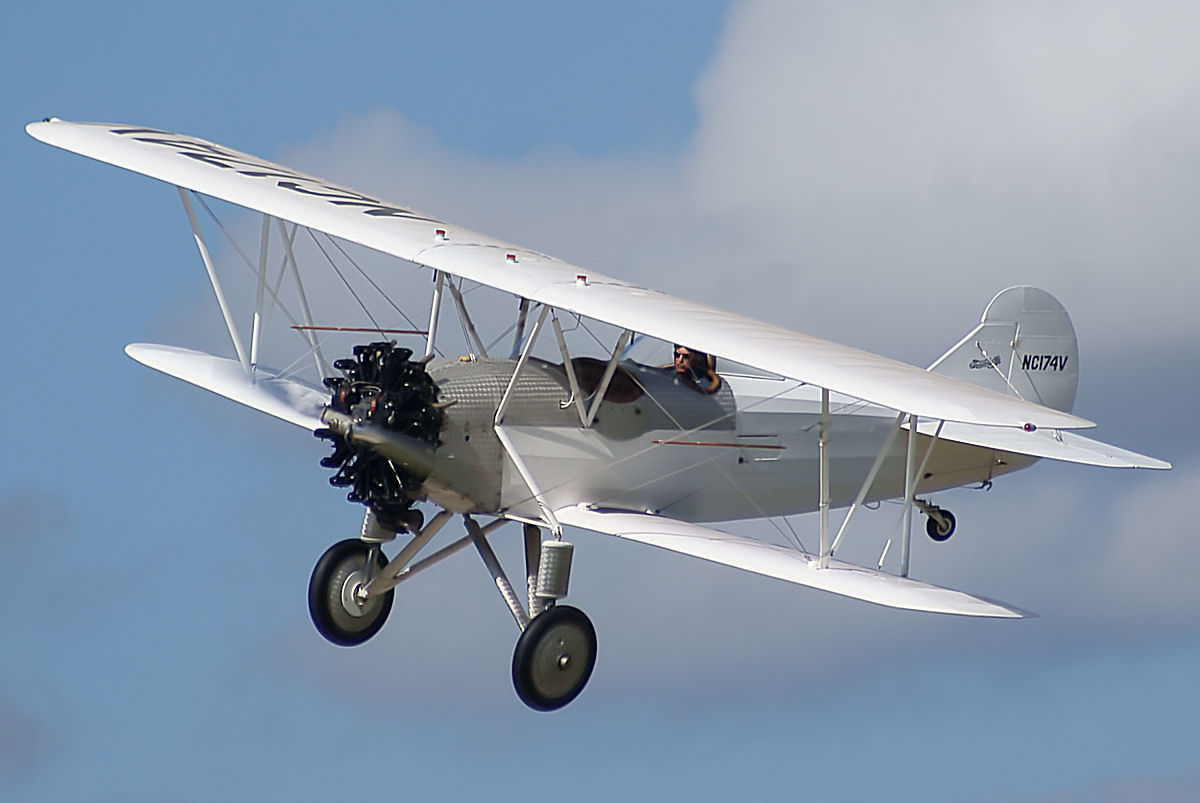
- Travel Air B-4000, registration NC174V

General information
- Type: General aviation
- National origin: United States
- Manufacturer: Travel Air
- Number built: c.100

History
- First flight: 1927
- Developed from: Travel Air Model B

The Travel Air 4000 is an American general-purpose biplane of the 1920s, a member of the family of aircraft that began with the Travel Air Model A. It was later known as the Model 4. Derived from the Model BW, around 100 were built, including two that were converted from Model 2000s.

== Design and development ==
Like other members of this family, the Model 4000 is an unequal-span, single-bay, staggered biplane of conventional design. The passengers and pilot sit in tandem, open cockpits. It has a conventional tail, and fixed, tailskid undercarriage. The fuselage is built from welded steel tubes, and the wings from wood. Travel Air model numbers primarily reflected changes in powerplant, and the Model 4000 was originally powered by a Wright J-5 or J-4 radial engine mounted in the nose, driving a tractor propeller. From late 1928 onwards, however, the Model 4000 and Model 4 designations were applied to aircraft powered by a wide variety of other air-cooled radial engines.

Travel Air built fourteen Model 4000s in 1927, and the design received type certificate ATC-32 in April 1928. Most Model BWs were registered under the same type certificate.

Starting with the Model B-4000, some variants had a new "outrigger" style undercarriage, where oleo struts were attached outboard of the main undercarriage units, connected to struts forward of the lower wing.

Model 4000 variants are distinguished by changes in their wing type and powerplant, although other characteristics such as undercarriage changes or roles such as mailplane or aerial spraying are sometimes also reflected in the model numbers.

The wing types are as follows:

| Wing type | Airfoil | Description | Year introduced |
|---|---|---|---|
| Type A | Travel Air #1 | Aerodynamically balanced ("elephant ear") ailerons, no fuel tank | 1925 |
| Type E | Travel Air #1 | Frise ailerons, no fuel tanks | 1927 |
| Type B | Travel Air #1 | Frise ailerons, fuel tanks | 1929 |
| Speedwing | Different, thinner wing | Frise ailerons, greater structural strength | 1929 |

== Operational history ==
Apart from its use in general avaiation, the Model 4000 was flown competitively. Louise Thaden flew a D-4000 to win the inaugural Women's Air Derby at the 1929 National Air Races.

They were also used for film work. D-4000s represented World War I Nieuport fighters in The Dawn Patrol (1930), Hell's Angels (1930), and Young Eagles (1930).

== Variants ==
Model 4000
standard model with Type A wing and Wright J-5 engine; type certificate ATC-32
Model A-4000
version with Type A wing and seven-cylinder Floco engine; type certificate ATC-148; 9 registered
Model B-4000
version with Type E or Type B wing, Wright J-5 engine, and outrigger undercarriage; type certificate ATC-146; 25 registered
Model C-4000
version built by Curtiss with Type A or Type E wing, and Curtiss Challenger engine,; type certificate ATC-149; prototype converted from a D-4000, then 22 registered, plus seven Model 2000s and two E-4000s converted
Model BC-4000
version based on C-4000 but with Type B wing and outrigger undercarriage; 1 built, later converted to SBC-4000
Model SBC-4000
floatplane version of BC-4000; approval number 2-154; 1 converted from BC-4000
Model SC-4000
floatplane version with Curtiss C-6 engine; designation might also have referred to floatplane version of BC-4000
Model D-4000
"speedwing" version with Wright J-5 engine; some built as single-seaters; approval number 2-84;
Model E-4000
version with Type E wing and Wright J-6-5 engine; approval number 2-156, superseded by type certificate ATC-188; most widely-produced of the Model 4000 family, 59 registered
Model BE-4000
version with Type E or Type B wing, Wright J-6 engine, and possibly outrigger undercarriage; 12 registered
Model J4-4000
version with Wright J-4 engine; approval number 2-243; at least 6 built
Model K-4000
version with Type A wing and Kinner K-5 engine; elongated nose to compensate for weight and balance changes; type certificate ATC-205; 6 built
Model DK-4000
"speedwing" version of the K-4000; 1 built
Model L-4000
version created by Parks Air College in 1941 to upgrade the Model 4000s they used as trainers by installing Lycoming R-680-B4 engines. These aircraft had dual controls and their rear cockpits were fitted with folding blind-flying hoods.
Model BM-4000
dedicated mailplane version with front cockpit replaced by mail compartment and with redesigned tail fin; Wright J-5 engine type certificate ATC-147; at least 7 built or converted
Model B9-4000
version with Type E or Type B wing, Wright J-6-9 engine, and outrigger undercarriage; some completed as single-seaters; some later fitted with NACA cowlings; approval number 2-381; 7 built or converted, including one from a Model 4-D
Model D9-4000
D-4000 modified for Arthur Goebel for airshow flying; speedwings (or otherwise clipped wings), Wright J-6-9 engine, and front cockpit replaced by chemical tank for smoke production; BM-4000-style fin fitted later; 1 converted
Model U-4000
alternative designation for Model 4-U
Model W-4000
version with Type A wing and Warner R-420 engine; approval number 2-35 superseded by type certificate ATC-112; 27 registered
Model DW-4000
"speedwing" version converted from the W-4000 prototype; Warner R-420 engine; 1 converted
Model 4000-CAM
alternative designation for Model 8000
Model 4000-SH
alternative designation for Model 9000
Model 4000-T
experimental major conversion by Curtiss from Model 4-D; new wings with automatic leading-edge slots, flaps of nearly full-span, and Tanager-style "floating ailerons"; 1 converted, in turn later converted to Model D-4-D
Model 4-D
development of the Model B-4000 with type B wing, Wright J-6 engine, and outrigger undercarriage; type certificate ATC-254; examples included two converted from Model BE-4000s
Model 4-P
version with ACE LA-1 engine and NACA cowling; approval number 2-160 superseded by type certificate ATC-280
Model 4-PT
alternative designation for Model 4-P
Model 4-S
experimental testbed for the Powell Lever Motor; 1 built
Model 4-U
catchall designation for early versions converted by Otto Timm to use Comet 7-cylinder radial engines
Model D-4-D
lightened version with reduced-span wings, Wright J-6 engine, and new undercarriage; approval number 2-178; 5 registered, plus another 6 converted from other variants
Model W-4-B
special racing version designed by Ted A. Wells; much shortened wings, Wright J-5 engine, and new undercarriage and interplane strut designs. 1 built.
Model Z-4-D
dedicated version for aerial spraying and heaviest of all the Travel Air biplane family; Wright J-6-9 engine; 1 built, plus 1 converted from Model 4000

== Operators ==
=== Civilian ===
Parks Air College
operated Model 4000s for training transport pilots. Some aircraft modified with Lycoming R-680-B4 engines.
San Diego Air Service
operated the W-4000
United States Department of Agriculture
operated the B-4000
United States Department of Commerce
operated the B-4000

=== Military ===
Peruvian Air Force
operated at least one E-4000

== Surviving aircraft ==
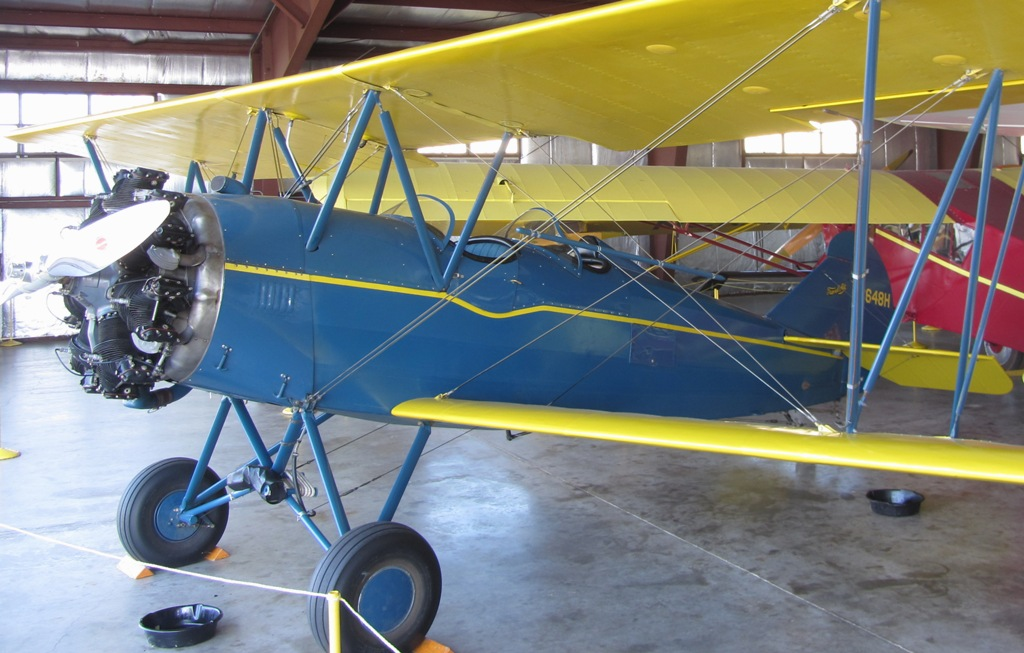
Travel Air E-4000 (NC648H)

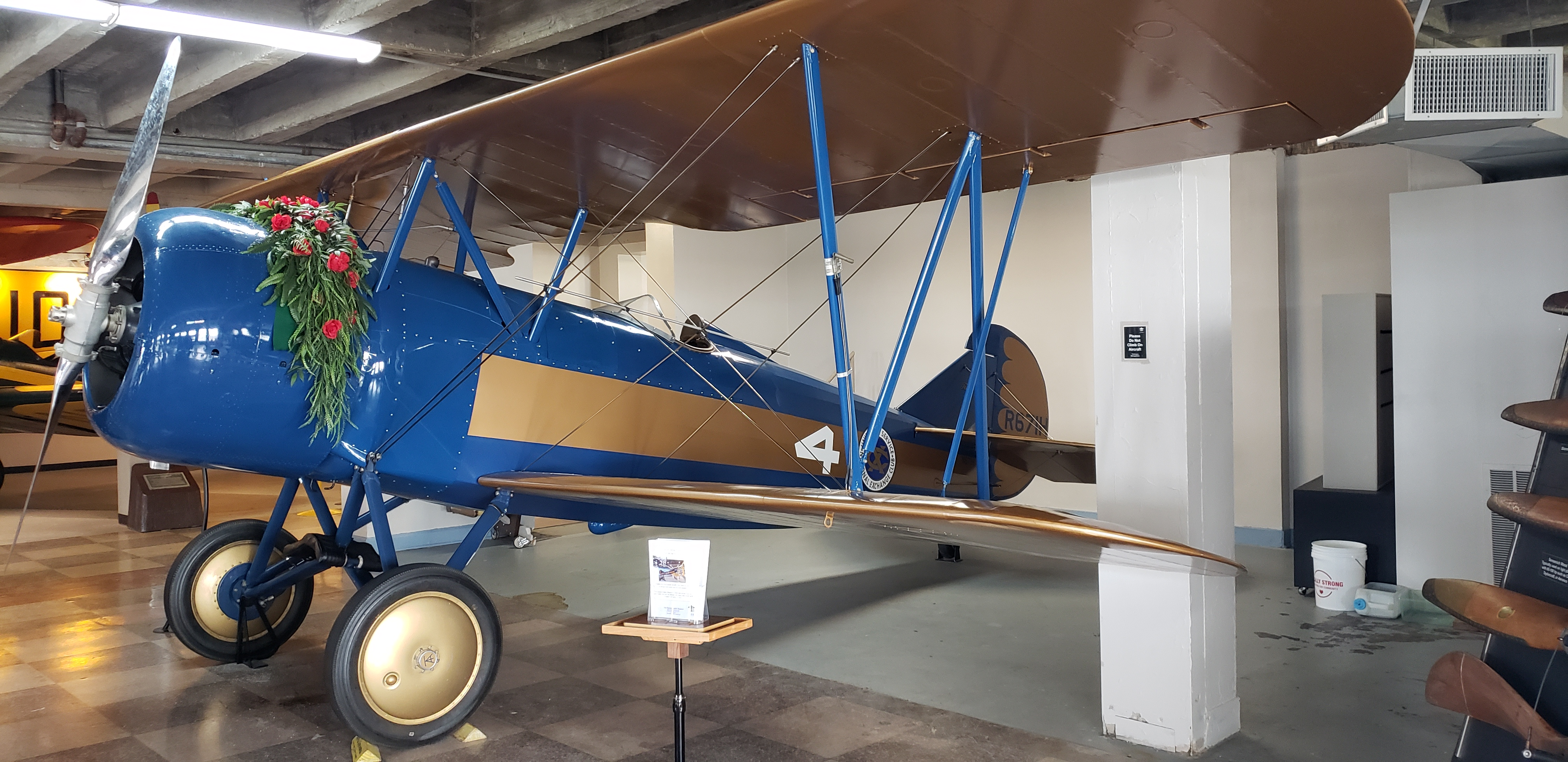
Travel Air D-4000 on display at the Kansas Aviation Museum

This is a partial list of surviving examples of the Model 4000 and its subtypes, confined to aircraft that are still in commercial use, in museums, or in some other way notable.

- construction number 374, registration NC4321 (current in 2024). As of 2024, this aircraft was bring used to offer scenic flights over the San Juan Islands.
- construction number 416, registration N1004 (current in 2024) at the Mid America Flight Museum, Mount Pleasant, Texas
- construction number 475, registration NC2709 (current in 2024) at the Kelch Aviation Museum, Brodhead, Wisconsin
- construction number 766, registration NC6425 (current in 2024), in the collection of the Cavanaugh Flight Museum in Addison, Texas (closed indefinitely from January 1, 2024)
- construction number 850, registration NC9049 (current in 2024) at the Western Antique Aeroplane & Automobile Museum, Hood River, Oregon
- construction number 1059, registration N9872 (current in 2024). As of 2022, this was the oldest aircraft regularly tracked by flight tracking service Flightradar24.
- construction number 1151, registration CF-JLW (current in 2024) at the Reynolds Museum, Wetaskiwin, Canada
- construction number 1224, registration NC648H (current in 2024) at EAA Aviation Museum, Oshkosh, Wisconsin
- construction number 1266, registration NR671H (current in 2024) in the collection of The Ninety-Nines Museum of Women Pilots. As of 2024, on loan to the Kansas Aviation Museum, Wichita, Kansas
- construction number 1295, registration NC367M (current in 2024) at Beechcraft Heritage Museum, Tullahoma, Tennessee
- construction number 1340, registration NC434N at the National Air and Space Museum, Washington, D.C.
- construction number 1365, registration NC174V (current in 2024) at Fantasy of Flight, Polk City, Florida
- construction number 1379, registration NC477N (current in 2024) at Owls Head Transportation Museum, Owls Head, Maine

== Specifications (E-4000) ==
Data from Phillips 1994, p. 102

General characteristics

- Crew: 1 pilot
- Capacity: 2 passengers
- Length: 24 ft 1 in (7.34 m)
- Wingspan: 33 ft 0 in (10.06 m)
- Wing area: 289 sq ft (26.8 m^{2})
- Empty weight: 1,640 lb (744 kg)
- Gross weight: 2,700 lb (1,225 kg)
- Powerplant: 1 × Wright J-6-5 9-cylinder, air-cooled, radial engine, 165 hp (123 kW)

Performance

- Maximum speed: 122 mph (196 km/h, 106 kn)
- Cruise speed: 103 mph (166 km/h, 90 kn)
- Range: 690 mi (1,110 km, 600 nmi)
- Service ceiling: 13,000 ft (4,000 m)
- Rate of climb: 700 ft/min (3.6 m/s)

== Notes ==
=== Bibliography ===
- "1927 Travel Air 4000". Kelch Aviation Museum. Brodhead, Wisconsin: Alfred & Lois Kelch Aviation Museum.
- "1928 Curtiss-Wright Travel Air 4000 C/N 416". TVRPhotography. Monterey California: TVRPhotography.
- "1929 Travel Air 4000". Fantasy of Flight. Polk City, Florida: Fantasy of Flight.
- "1929 Travel Air E-4000 - NC648H". EAA. Oshkosh, Wisconsin: Experimental Aircraft Association.
- "1930 Curtiss-Wright Travel Air D-4000 Speedwing". Owls Head Transportation Museum. Owls Head, Maine: Owls Head Transportation Museum.
- "Aircraft". Cavanaugh Flight Museum. Addison, Texas: Cavanaugh Flight Museum. Archived from the original on December 5, 2018.
- "Aircraft Inquiry [1004]". Federal Aviation Administration.
- "Aircraft Inquiry [174V]". Federal Aviation Administration.
- "Aircraft Inquiry [2709]". Federal Aviation Administration.
- "Aircraft Inquiry [367M]". Federal Aviation Administration.
- "Aircraft Inquiry [4321]". Federal Aviation Administration.
- "Aircraft Inquiry [477N]". Federal Aviation Administration.
- "Aircraft Inquiry [6425]". Federal Aviation Administration.
- "Aircraft Inquiry [648H]". Federal Aviation Administration.
- "Aircraft Inquiry [671H]". Federal Aviation Administration.
- "Aircraft Inquiry [9049]". Federal Aviation Administration.
- "Aircraft Inquiry [9872]". Federal Aviation Administration.
- "CCAR - Aircraft Details". Transport Canada.
- Hagedorn, Dan (2006). Latin American Air Wars and Aircraft 1912–1969. Crowborough, UK: Hikoki.
- "Inside Exhibits". Kansas Aviation Museum. Wichita Kansas: Kansas Aviation Museum.
- Juptner, Joseph P. (1962a). U.S. Civil Aircraft Vol. 1 (ATC 1-100). Los Angeles: Aero Publishers.
- Juptner, Joseph P. (1962b). U.S. Civil Aircraft Vol. 2 (ATC 101-200). Los Angeles: Aero Publishers.
- Juptner, Joseph P. (1962c). U.S. Civil Aircraft Vol. 3 (ATC 201-300). Los Angeles: Aero Publishers.
- Juptner, Joseph P. (1962d). U.S. Civil Aircraft Vol. 9 (ATC 801-817). Los Angeles: Aero Publishers.
- Leigh, Gabriel. "Nothing but a number? Aircraft age explained". Flightradar24. Stockholm: Flightradar24.
- "Louise Thaden's Travel Air". The Ninety-Nines Museum of Women Pilots. Oklahoma City, Oklahoma: The Ninety-Nines Museum of Women Pilots.
- "Parish Travel Air". Beechcraft Heritage Museum. Tullahoma, Tennessee: Beechcraft Heritage Museum. Archived from the original on October 7, 2014.
- Pelletier, Alain J. (1995). Beech Aircraft and their Predecessors. London: Putnam Aeronautical.
- Phillips, Edward H. (1994). Travel Air: Wings over the Prairie. Eagan, Minnesota: Flying Books International.
- "Scenic Air Tours". Cap'n Mac's Magic Air Biplane Tours. Eastsound, Washington.
- Skaarup, Harold A. (2009). Canadian Warplanes. Bloomington, Indiana: iUniverse.
- Sullivan, Cole. "Historic Addison flight museum announces closure". wfaa.com. Dallas, Texas: WFAA-TV.
- Taylor, Michael J. H. (1993). Jane's Encyclopedia of Aviation. London: Studio Editions.
- "Travel Air 4000". Mid America Flight Museum. Mount Pleasant, Texas: Mid America Flight Museum.
- "Travel Air 4000". Western Antique Aeroplane & Automobile Museum. Hood River, Oregon: Western Antique Aeroplane & Automobile Museum.
- "Travel Air D4D". National Air and Space Museum. Washington, D.C.: Smithsonian Institution.
