= Deland Travel Air 2000 =

American homebuilt aircraft

General information
- Type: Homebuilt aircraft
- National origin: United States
- Manufacturer: Orlando Helicopter Airways
- Status: Production completed
- Number built: one

History
- Developed from: Travel Air 2000

The Deland Travel Air 2000 is an American homebuilt aircraft that was designed and produced by Orlando Helicopter Airways, an aircraft maintenance and repair company located in DeLand, Florida. When it was available the aircraft was supplied as a kit for amateur construction and marketed under the "Deland" brand, named for the company's location. Plans were also available.

== Design and development ==
The Deland Travel Air 2000 was developed from the original 1920s vintage Travel Air 2000, with the incorporation of numerous airframe improvements and the use of a modern engine.

The aircraft features an interplane strut, cabane strut and cable-braced biplane layout, a three-seat open cockpit, with two passengers accommodated in side-by-side configuration in the front open cockpit and the pilot in the rear cockpit with a windshield. The aircraft has fixed conventional landing gear and a single engine in tractor configuration.

The Deland Travel Air 2000 is made from a combination of metal and wood, all covered in doped aircraft fabric. Its 34.70 ft (10.6 m) span wing has a wing area of 296.0 sq ft (27.50 m^{2}). The standard engine used is the 300 hp (224 kW) Thrust Mark VI powerplant.

The aircraft has a typical empty weight of 1,450 lb (660 kg) and a gross weight of 2,590 lb (1,170 kg), giving a useful load of 1,140 lb (520 kg). With full fuel of 30 U.S. gallons (110 L; 25 imp gal) the payload for the pilot, passengers and baggage is 960 lb (440 kg).

The standard day, sea level, no-wind takeoff and landing roll with a 300 hp (224 kW) engine is 200 ft (61 m).

== Operational history ==
By 1998 the company reported that one kit had been sold, completed and was flying.

== Specifications (Deland Travel Air 2000) ==
Data from AeroCrafter

General characteristics

- Crew: one
- Capacity: two passengers
- Length: 24.20 ft (7.38 m)
- Wingspan: 34.70 ft (10.58 m)
- Wing area: 296.0 sq ft (27.50 m^{2})
- Empty weight: 1,450 lb (658 kg)
- Gross weight: 2,590 lb (1,175 kg)
- Fuel capacity: 30 U.S. gallons (110 L; 25 imp gal)
- Powerplant: 1 × Thrust Mark VI four stroke aircraft engine, 300 hp (220 kW)
- Propellers: 2-bladed wooden fixed pitch

Performance

- Maximum speed: 120 mph (190 km/h, 100 kn)
- Cruise speed: 90 mph (140 km/h, 78 kn)
- Stall speed: 40 mph (64 km/h, 35 kn)
- Range: 500 mi (800 km, 430 nmi)
- Service ceiling: 18,000 ft (5,500 m)
- Rate of climb: 1,200 ft/min (6.1 m/s)
- Wing loading: 8.75 lb/sq ft (42.7 kg/m^{2})
