= Travel Air 8000 =

American general-purpose biplane of the 1920s

Model 8000

General information
- Type: General aviation
- National origin: United States
- Manufacturer: Travel Air
- Number built: 3

History
- First flight: 1927
- Developed from: Travel Air Model B

The Travel Air 8000 was an American general-purpose biplane of the 1920s, a member of the family of aircraft that began with the Travel Air Model A. It was also known as the Travel Air 4000-CAM, and later as the Curtiss-Wright CW-8 after Curtiss-Wright acquired Travel Air. Only three examples were built.

== Design and development ==
Like other members of this family, the Model 8000 was an unequal-span, single-bay, staggered biplane of conventional design. The passengers and pilot sat in tandem, open cockpits. It had a conventional tail, and fixed, tailskid undercarriage. The fuselages were built from welded steel tubes, and the wings from wood. Travel Air model numbers primarily reflected changes in powerplant, and the Model 8000 was powered by a Fairchild-Caminez 447 radial engine mounted in the nose, driving a tractor propeller.

The prototype Model 8000 was a re-manufactured Travel Air Model B. Its engine was an innovative design that used a cam in place of a crankshaft. The result was an engine that was mechanically simpler and which ran at half the RPMs of a conventional radial engine for the same power, promising greater efficiency. The low RPMs needed a larger propeller, 10 feet (3.0 m) in diameter, compared to the 8-foot-4-inch (2.54 m) propeller of the Travel Air 2000. In turn, the larger propeller needed more ground clearance, which meant that the whole powerplant had to be mounted higher on the Model 8000's nose.

Despite much enthusiasm for the new engine among American manufacturers, it did not work well. It was prone to excessive vibration, even to the point of splitting propellers, it ran hot because the large propeller hubs needed to absorb its torque also blocked cooling air from the cylinders, and that torque also twisted airframes.

It proved very difficult for Fairchild-Caminez to get the engine operating reliably enough to pass certification. By the time this was achieved, in June 1928, the Model 8000 itself had already received type certificate ATC-37 in April. It would be the only aircraft type certified to use this engine.

Beside the prototype, only two other examples of the Model 8000 were built, and no details about them other than one construction number have been preserved.

The problems with the engine proved insurmountable, and development was abandoned in fall, 1928. It was withdrawn from sale, and Fairchild Aircraft founder Sherman Fairchild offered customers their money back.

By March 1929, the Fairchild-Caminez engine was removed from the prototype Model 8000 and the aircraft was converted into a Travel Air 2000.

== Operational history ==
Fairchild Aircraft purchased the prototype, and entered it in the 1928 Ford National Reliability Air Tour together with a Fairchild-Caminez 447-powered Waco 10. Flown by James Nelson Kelly, the Model 8000 finished in thirteenth place out of a field of twenty-five, requiring several engine changes.

== Specifications ==
Data from Phillips 1994, p.106

General characteristics

- Crew: 1 pilot
- Capacity: 2 passengers
- Length: 24 ft 2 in (7.37 m)
- Wingspan: 34 ft 8 in (10.57 m)
- Height: 8 ft 9 in (2.67 m)
- Wing area: 296 sq ft (27.5 m^{2})
- Empty weight: 1,475 lb (669 kg)
- Gross weight: 2,300 lb (1,043 kg)
- Powerplant: 1 × Fairchild-Caminez 447 Four-cylinder, air-cooled, radial engine, 120 hp (89 kW)

Performance

- Maximum speed: 110 mph (180 km/h, 96 kn)
- Range: 450–500 mi (720–800 km, 390–430 nmi)

== Notes ==
=== Bibliography ===
- Bowers, Peter M. (1979). Curtiss Aircraft 1907–1947. London: Putnam Aeronautical.
- "Fairchild Caminez 447-C, Radial 4 Engine, Cutaway". National Air and Space Museum. Washington, D.C.: The Smithsonian Institution. n.d.
- Forden, Lesley (1972). The Ford Air Tours 1925–1931. New Brighton, Minnesota: Aviation Foundation of America.
- Juptner, Joseph P. (1962). U.S. Civil Aircraft Vol. 1 (ATC 1-100). Los Angeles: Aero Publishers.
- Pelletier, Alain J. (1995). Beech Aircraft and their Predecessors. London: Putnam Aeronautical.
- Phillips, Edward H. (1994). Travel Air: Wings over the Prairie. Eagan, Minnesota: Flying Books International.
- Taylor, Michael J. H. (1993). Jane's Encyclopedia of Aviation. London: Studio Editions.
