= Travel Air Model 11 =

American racing biplane of 1929

Model 11

General information
- Type: Racing aircraft
- National origin: United States of America
- Manufacturer: Travel Air
- Number built: 2

History
- Developed from: Travel Air 2000

The Travel Air Model 11, also known as the Travel Air Model 11000 or the Curtiss-Wright Travel Air CW-11, was an American racing biplane developed from the general-purpose Travel Air 2000, and its derivative the Model 4-D. Two examples competed in different events during the 1929 National Air Races, including the inaugural Women's Air Derby. Pioneering woman aviator Marvel Crosson was killed flying a Model 11 in the latter event.

== Design and development ==
The two Model 11s built differed considerably, but shared the same general configuration as other Travel Air biplanes of the era. They were single-bay, staggered biplanes of conventional design, with open cockpits and fixed, tailskid undercarriage. They had conventional tails and were powered by nose-mounted radial engines driving tractor propellers. The fuselages were built from welded steel tubes, and the wings from wood.

The first was a re-manufactured Travel Air 2000. This aircraft (construction number 794, registered X-6473) was built in September or October 1928 as a D-2000 subtype, with shorter-span and thinner "speedwings", a narrowed fuselage, and a new tail fin design. It was nicknamed "The Bug" at the factory, and its aerodynamic improvements while retaining its standard Curtiss OX-5 engine made it competitive in the 90-horsepower (67 kW) racing class. Ira McConaughey flew it to a race victory at Newton, Kansas in early October. Art Goebel raced it in Jackson, Mississippi in November, naming it The Chaparral. A plan existed to re-engine it with a Warner Scarab, but it is now uncertain whether this was carried out before it was rebuilt into a Model 11. The rebuild gave the aircraft new, thicker wings, different strut and aileron arrangements, new undercarriage, and a 240-horsepower (180 kW) Wright J-6-7 engine enclosed by a NACA cowling.

The second was a new-build aircraft, based on the Model 4-D fuselage design, albeit shortened and narrowed. It was the result of a proposal by Travel Air engineers Herb Rawdon and Walter Burnham to develop a dedicated competition aircraft for the 1929 National Air Races. In June 1929, company president Walter Beech approved the construction of three aircraft for the competition, two were to be a new monoplane design, the Type R, and one was to be based on an existing Travel Air biplane design, modified for speed, which became the second Model 11. Designated B-11-D (construction number 1267, registration NR612K), the aircraft adopted the shorter wings, redesigned fin, and NACA-cowled Wright J-6-7 as used on X-6473. This second Model 11 was awarded airworthiness approval 2-399 on February 3, 1932.

== Operational history ==
Union Oil sponsored Marvel Crosson's entry in the 1929 Women's Air Derby, and as the first competitor to file her race paperwork, she was assigned race number "1" for the event. While ferrying her Model 11 from Wichita, Kansas to the Derby start line at Santa Monica, California, Marvel had reported engine problems and had ordered a replacement. Unwilling to wait for the new engine to arrive from Los Angeles, Crosson decided to start the event with her original engine and meet its replacement in Phoenix, Arizona.

August 19, the second day of flying, was to bring the competitors from San Bernardino, California to Phoenix via stops in Calexico, California and Yuma, Arizona. Crosson departed Yuma at 11:54 a.m., and never arrived in Phoenix. She had not reported any problems with the aircraft. As event officials traced her probable route, a six-year-old girl reported seeing a plane go down near Wellton, Arizona. The following day, a search party covered 100 square miles (260 km^{2}) on horseback on the banks of the Gila River. Searchers found the wreckage of the Model 11 in a ravine, and Crosson's body 100 yards (91 m) away. She was wrapped in her partially-opened parachute, suggesting that she had stayed with the aircraft too long before bailing out. The cause of the accident was never determined. Theories put forward included sabotage by someone unhappy to see women flying, and carbon-monoxide poisoning, as Louise Thaden had been almost overcome by exhaust fumes in her similar Travel Air on her way to the Derby.

The second Model 11 had started tests the day before Crosson's accident, but suffered a mishap of its own. While mechanics tested the throttle, the engine backfired and set fire to the nitrate-doped wings. Fortunately, another set of wings was under construction, but the incident delayed NR612K's departure for the races. William H. Emery flew it to fourth place in its class in the Portland-to-Cleveland race. Ira McConaughey then flew it to fourth place in the "Australian pursuit" event at Cleveland.

Following the 1929 National Air Races, NR612K underwent further modifications, including a new forward fuselage, revised undercarriage, and a turtledeck that faired in the rear cockpit. Still later, the wingspan was further reduced. The aircraft remained on the FAA register until February 1956.

== Specifications ==
Data from various, as noted

General characteristics

- Crew: 1 pilot
- Gross weight: 2,083 lb (945 kg)
- Powerplant: 1 × Wright J-6-7 7-cylinder, air-cooled, radial engine, 240 hp (180 kW)

Performance

- Maximum speed: 160 mph (260 km/h, 140 kn)

== Notes ==
=== Bibliography ===
- "Aircraft Inquiry". Federal Aviation Administration.
- Blair, Margaret Whitman (2006). The roaring 20 : the first cross-country air race for women. Washington, D.C.: National Geographic.
- Burghy, Rebecca (May–June 2023). "The Adventures of Marvel Crosson". Ninety-Nines Magazine. Oklahoma City: The Ninety-Nines International Association of Women Pilots. pp. 8–13.
- Jones, Callie (March 30, 2023). "Museum shares stories of pioneering female aviators". Journal Advocate. Sterling, Colorado: Media News Group.
- Juptner, Joseph P. (1962). U.S. Civil Aircraft Vol. 9 (ATC 801-817). Los Angeles: Aero Publishers.
- Pelletier, Alain J. (1995). Beech Aircraft and their Predecessors. London: Putnam Aeronautical.
- Phillips, Edward H. (1994). Travel Air: Wings over the Prairie. Eagan, Minnesota: Flying Books International.
- Simpson, Julie (August 2020). "Star of the Clouds". Colorado Country Life. Denver: Colorado Rural Electric Association. pp. 16–19.
