= Trek Aerospace =

- Type: Private
- Industry: Manufacturing; Engineering; Aerospace
- Founded: 1996
- Headquarters: Folsom, California
- Products: Ducted prop technology
- Website: trekaero.com

Trek Aerospace Inc is a small engineering company based in Folsom, California, United States. Despite its name, Trek Aerospace currently manufactures only terrestrial ducted-fan-powered aircraft and watercraft. The company is known for its ducted-fan based "jetpacks", an exoskeleton mounted with dual ducted-fan propulsion, such as the Springtail model.

== History ==
Trek Aerospace Inc. was founded by Robert Bulga in March 1996 as Millennium Jet. It was headquartered in Sunnyvale until the company moved to Folsom in 2009. The company changed its name to Trek Aerospace in July 2002.

== See also ==
- SoloTrek XFV
