= Fort Florida, Florida =

Fort Florida
- Location within Volusia County
- Coordinates: 28°52′04″N 81°21′16″W
- Country: United States
- State: Florida
- County: Volusia
- Elevation: 16 ft (5 m)
- Time zone: UTC-5 (Eastern (EST))
  - Summer (DST): UTC-4 (EDT)
- enter ZIP code: 32713
- Area code: 386
- GNIS feature ID: 300822

Fort Florida is a community located in southwest Volusia County, Florida, United States within the city limits of DeBary. The community shares its name with the historic fort which existed in an area which is now private property in the late 1830s and 1840s. On January 9, 2026, DeBary opened Fire Station 39, located on 798 Fort Florida Road. The city of DeBary received $5.0 million in funding from both the state and the county for the creation of a nature park which it plans to open on Alexander Island located, with an area of roughly 224 acres, on the St. Johns River.
