= Travel Air 2000 =

American civilian biplane

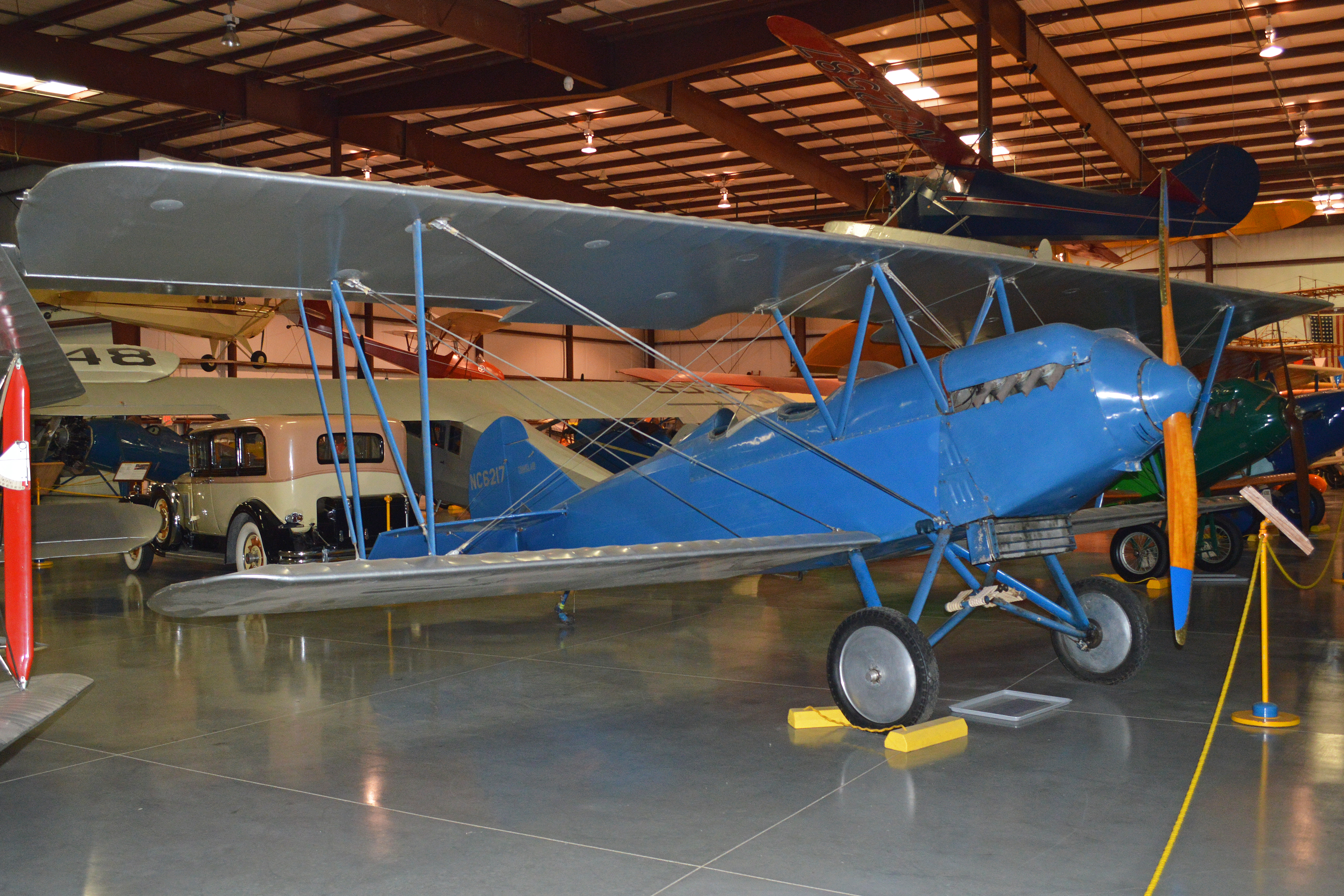
- Travel Air 2000 NC6217

General information
- Type: Biplane aircraft
- Manufacturer: Travel Air, Curtiss-Wright
- Designer: Lloyd Stearman
- Status: Retired
- Primary user: Private owners, aerial sightseeing businesses
- Number built: approx 1,300

History
- Manufactured: 1925–1930
- Introduction date: 1925
- First flight: 13 March 1925
- Developed from: Travel Air Model B
- Developed into: Paramount Cabinaire

The Travel Air 2000 is an open-cockpit biplane aircraft produced in the United States in the late 1920s by the Travel Air Manufacturing Company. During the period from 1924–1929, Travel Air produced more aircraft than any other American manufacturer, including over 1,000 biplanes. While an exact number is almost impossible to ascertain due to the number of conversions and rebuilds, some estimates for Travel Air as a whole range from 1,200 to nearly 2,000 aircraft.

== Design and development ==
The Travel Air Model A was engineered chiefly by Lloyd Stearman, with input from Travel Air co-founders Walter Beech, Clyde Cessna, and Bill Snook and could trace its ancestry back to the Swallow New Swallow biplane. The Travel Air, however, replaced the New Swallow's wooden fuselage structure with welded steel tubes. An interim design, the Winstead Special, was developed by the Winstead brothers from a metal fuselage frame developed at Swallow by Stearman and Walter Beech, but subsequently rejected by Swallow president Jake Moellendick, a decision which triggered the departure of both Stearman and Beech, and the creation of Travel Air. Until the appearance of the all new 12/14/16 series, all subsequent Travel Air biplanes would be derived from the Model A.

The Travel Air biplanes were conventional single-bay biplanes with staggered wings braced by N-struts. The fuselage was fabric-covered welded chromium-molybdenum alloy steel tubes, faired with wooden battens and they had two open cockpits in tandem, with the forward cockpit carrying two passengers side by side.

In common with the Fokker D.VII that they resembled, the rudder and ailerons of the first Travel Air biplanes had an overhanging "horns" to counterbalance the aerodynamic loads on the controls, helping to reduce control forces and making for a more responsive aircraft. These were the distinctive Travel Air "elephant ear" ailerons which led to the airplane's popular nicknames of Old Elephant Ears and Wichita Fokker. Some subsequent models were offered without the counterbalance, providing a cleaner, more conventional appearance with less drag. Pitch forces could be trimmed out with an inflight-adjustable horizontal stabilizer.

Different, interchangeable wings were offered, including a shorter and thinner wing known as the "Speedwing" which improved speed.

A considerable number of engines were installed, including nearly every mass-produced engine in the 90–300 hp (67–224 kW) range available at the time, and a number of more obscure prototype engines, as can be seen in the list of designation prefixes.

The Travel Air biplanes were noted for their good flying qualities which may have helped Travel Air outsell all rivals by 1929.

=== Steam-powered ===
In 1933, George and William Besler replaced the usual gasoline powered piston engine in a Travel Air 2000 with an oil-fired, reversible V-twin compounding steam engine, which would become the first steam-powered aircraft to fly successfully.

== Operational history ==
In addition to a wide range of normal aircraft applications, the Travel Air biplanes saw extensive use in early motion pictures, where they often stood in for the increasingly scarce Fokker D.VII.

Aside from surplus military aircraft such as the Curtiss JN-4 Jenny and along with their chief competitor WACO, Travel Air biplanes were the most widely used civilian biplanes during the late 1920s and very early 1930s in America.

Travel Air biplanes were popular as executive transports, and many were purchased by wealthy-sportsmen adventurers who entered them in the competitions and air races that were frequently held during that era. Like many aircraft of the period, they also operated as air taxis and provided air charter services, carrying passengers and light air cargo, and some would find their way north where they worked as bushplanes. As the supply of war-surplus aircraft declined and they became available on the used aircraft market, many were also used for barnstorming, which included exhibition and stunt flying, and selling rides. Commercial operators found the Travel Air biplanes to be versatile, owing to their useful payload, rugged construction and (for the times) speed and efficiency.

Towards the end of their career elsewhere, from the late-1930s through the early 1960s, they were increasingly used for the harsh work of bush flying and cropdusting, and Travel Air biplanes were among the most commonly used cropdusters, perhaps second only to surplus Stearman Kaydet biplanes.

Most remaining Travel Air biplanes have been restored, and are in museums, while a small number continue to be used for personal recreation or selling rides and flying at airshows.

As the Model 2000 was nearing the end of its development cycle, a pair of new designs, the Travel Air 12 and 14 were developed to replace it - the 12 as a slightly smaller two-seat trainer, and the larger 14 as a direct replacement, even to continuing some of the marketing names. Both would fly while Travel Air retained its identity, but would be incorporated into the Curtiss-Wright line with the same numbers.

=== Movie industry ===
Travel Air biplanes were widely used in 1920s/1930s war movies, particularly to represent the airplanes they were patterned after: Germany's Fokker D-VII fighter, the top fighter of World War I. In the motion picture industry, they were known as "Wichita Fokkers." In fact, Hollywood's demand for Travel Air biplanes was so intense that Travel Air's California salesman, Fred Hoyt, coaxed Travel Air co-founder and principal airplane designer, Lloyd Stearman, to come to Venice, California in 1926 to exploit the movie industry demand for his aircraft by starting the short-lived independent Stearman Aircraft Company (re-opened back in Wichita in 1927).

Some of the many movies using Travel Air biplanes (2000 and 4000, in particular) included:

- Wings (1927) won the first-ever Academy Award for Best Picture for its technical accuracy
- Flying Fool (1929) early leading roles for William Boyd, later famous as "Hopalong Cassidy")
- Hell's Angels (1930) extravagant war epic by Howard Hughes
- The Dawn Patrol (1930)
- Heartbreak (1931)
- Ace of Aces (1933) featured five Travel Air Model Bs, and numerous other aircraft.
- Hell in the Heavens (1933)
- Flying Devils (1933)
- Murder in the Clouds (1934)

== Variants ==
Date from Aerofiles

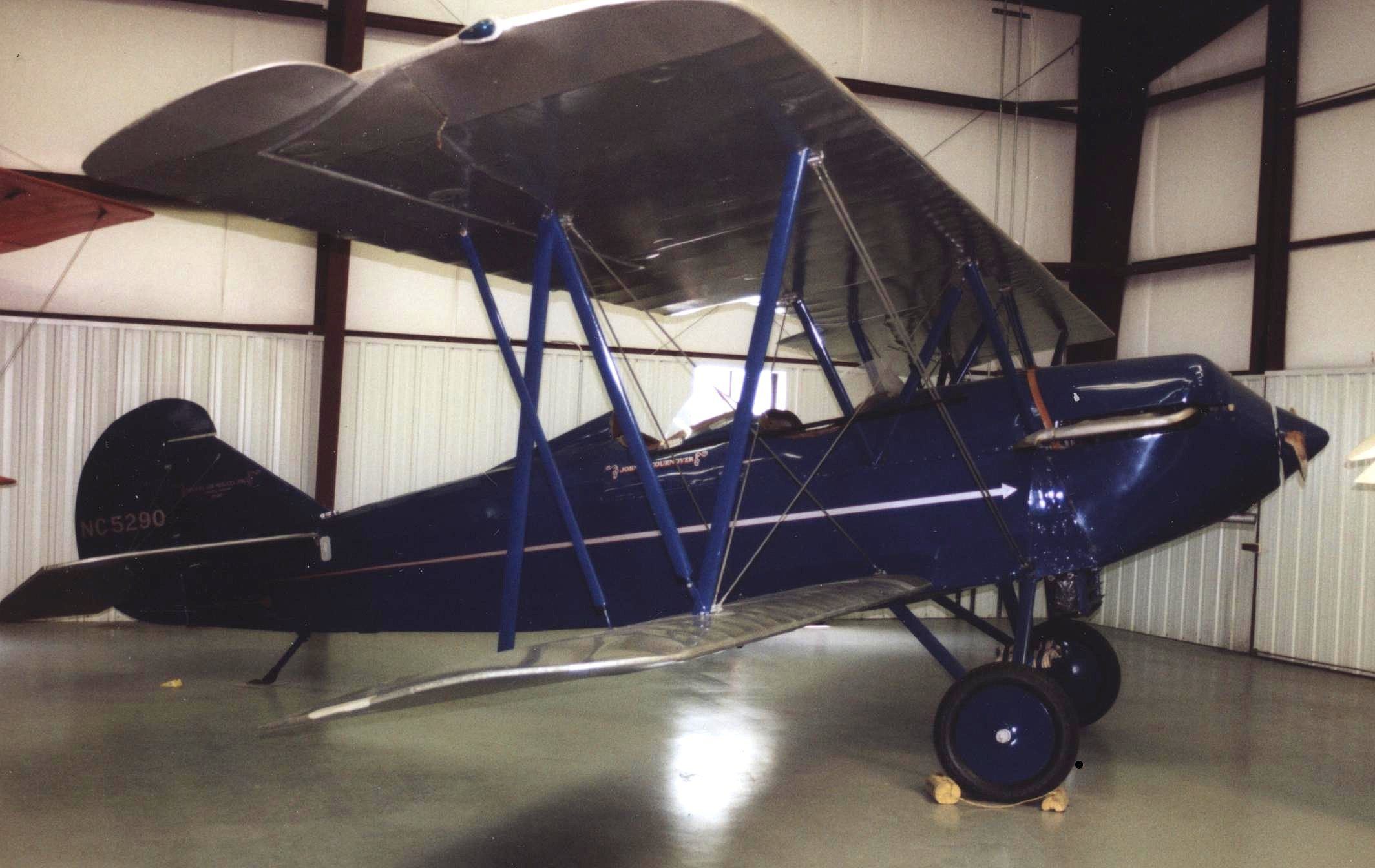
Curtiss OX-5-powered Travel Air 2000 at the Historic Aircraft Restoration Museum, Dauster Field, Creve Coeur, Missouri

Variants were distinguished with prefixes and suffixes in a particular order, and denoting different fittings. The prefix S, preceding all other prefixes meant it was a Seaplane and was fitted with floats. Next it was wings. B was the Standard wing, not to be confused with the original basic elephant ear wing, and D indicated the aircraft was fitted with a Speedwing.

The engine code followed this, and due to the long service period when considerable experimentation occurred, a wide variety of engines were installed in production airplane as follows:

- C - Curtiss C-6 inline engine
- D - 150 hp (110 kW) Aeromarine B 6-cylinder inline engine

Suffixes were also added that were specific to modifications made and often referred to conversions or post-production versions.

2000
Improved Model B with 90 hp (67 kW) Curtiss OX-5 engine. First Travel Air to be Type Certified.
C-2000
160 hp (120 kW) Curtiss C-6 6-cylinder inline engine
D-2000
OX-5-powered racing aircraft with reduced-span wings and narrower fuselage. Later converted to Model 11.
S-2000
Unofficial designation for floatplane version of 2000. Also used for 2000 powered by 100 hp (75 kW) Curtiss OXX-6 (twin ignition version of OX-5).
SC-2000
160 hp (120 kW) Curtiss C-6 powered landplane with undercarriage of B-4000. At least three converted.
2000-T
115 hp (86 kW) Milwaukee Tank V470 air-cooled derivative of OX-5. 15 built.

== Surviving aircraft ==
- 206 (NC1081) – at the Golden Age Air Museum in Bethel, Pennsylvania.
- 669 (NC6217) – static display at the Yanks Air Museum in Chino, California.
- 720 (CF-AFG) – on static display at the Canada Aviation and Space Museum in Ottawa, Ontario.
- 721 (NC6282) – on static display at the Shannon Air Museum in Fredericksburg, Virginia.

== Specifications (OX-5 Travel Air 2000 (ATC 30)) ==
Data from U.S. Civil Aircraft Vol. 1 (ATC 1 - 100)

General characteristics

- Crew: One
- Capacity: Two passengers
- Length: 24 ft 2 in (7.37 m)
- Upper wingspan: 34 ft 8 in (10.57 m)
- Upper wing chord: 66.75 in (1.695 m)
- Lower wingspan: 28 ft 8 in (8.74 m)
- Lower wing chord: 55.75 in (1.416 m)
- Height: 8 ft 11 in (2.72 m)
- Wing area: 297 sq ft (27.6 m^{2})
- Airfoil: Travel Air #1
- Empty weight: 1,335 lb (606 kg)
- Gross weight: 2,180 lb (989 kg)
- Useful load: 845 lb (383 kg)
- Fuel capacity: 42 US gal (160 L; 35 imp gal)
- Oil capacity: 4 US gal (15 L; 3.3 imp gal)
- Powerplant: 1 × Curtiss OX-5 water-cooled V8 engine, 90 hp (67 kW)
- Propellers: 2-bladed wooden fixed-pitch propeller

Performance

- Maximum speed: 100 mph (160 km/h, 87 kn)
- Cruise speed: 85 mph (137 km/h, 74 kn)
- Minimum control speed: 40 mph (64 km/h, 35 kn)
- Range: 425 mi (684 km, 369 nmi)
- Service ceiling: 10,000 ft (3,000 m) no load
- Rate of climb: 550 ft/min (2.8 m/s)

== See also ==
- Deland Travel Air 2000, a modern replica of the aircraft

=== Aircraft of comparable role, configuration and era ===
(Partial listing, only covers most numerous types)

- Alexander Eaglerock
- American Eagle A-101
- Brunner-Winkle Bird
- Buhl-Verville CA-3 Airster
- Command-Aire 3C3
- Parks P-1
- Pitcairn Mailwing
- Spartan C3
- Stearman C2 and C3
- Swallow New Swallow
- Waco 10

=== Related lists ===
- List of aircraft
- List of civil aircraft
