= Travel Air 9000 =

American general-purpose biplane of the 1920s

Model 9000

General information
- Type: General aviation
- National origin: United States
- Manufacturer: Travel Air
- Number built: 4

History
- First flight: 1927
- Developed from: Travel Air 3000; Travel Air 4000

The Travel Air 9000 was an American general-purpose biplane of the 1920s, a member of the family of aircraft that began with the Travel Air Model A. It was later known as the Curtiss-Wright CW-9 after Curtiss-Wright acquired Travel Air. Only four examples were built, two each converted from Travel Air 3000s and 4000s.

== Design and development ==
Like other members of this family, the Model 9000 was an unequal-span, single-bay, staggered biplane of conventional design. The passengers and pilot sat in tandem, open cockpits. It had a conventional tail, and fixed, tailskid undercarriage. The fuselage was built from welded steel tubes, and the wings from wood. Travel Air model numbers primarily reflected changes in powerplant, and the Model 9000 was powered by a Siemens-Halske Sh 14 radial engine mounted in the nose, driving a tractor propeller.

The prototype, registered X-3791, began life as Model 4000, construction number 302. It was licensed on December 16, 1927, and received type certificate ATC-38 the following April. The second Model 9000 (registered NC4420) also began as a Model 4000 (construction number 380), while the other two were conversions from Model 3000s.

NC4420, named Smith's Incubator, was re-engined for a time with a 120-horsepower (89 kW) 10-cylinder Anzani engine, (Note: Pelletier states that this was a six-cylinder Anzani engine of 120 horsepower. However, Anzani six-cylinder engines developed only around 45 horsepower, while the 120-horsepower figure correlates to their ten-cylinder engine. This article follows Juptner and Phillips, who both state that this aircraft was fitted with a ten-cylinder engine.) receiving approval 2-25 in July 1928. It was later converted back to Sh 14 power.

== Operational history ==
A subsequent owner fitted the prototype Model 9000 with an extra 40-US-gallon (150 L; 33 imp gal) fuel tank. In this configuration, Viola Gentry used it to set a new aerial endurance record for women. On December 3, 1928, she stayed aloft over Long Island for 8 hours 6 minutes and 37 seconds.

George B. Peck flew a Model 9000 in the 1928 Ford National Reliability Air Tour, attaining 22nd place.

Seventeen-year-old Richard James flew a Model 9000 named Spirit of American Youth to claim a $1,000 prize from the American Society of the Promotion of Aviation for the first young person under the age of eighteen to complete a transcontinental flight. (Note: Contemporary sources disagree on the conditions of the prize; the Christian Science Monitor reported it as a pilot under the age of eighteen, but Time reported it as a pilot under the age of twenty-one.) James departed San Francisco on October 30, 1928 and arrived at Curtiss Field, Long Island on December 15. (Note: Juptner states that this flight was "from New York to California". This article follows contemporary and more specific press accounts.) The Siemens-Halske company presented him with a silver loving cup and President Calvin Coolidge shook his hand.

== Specifications ==
Data from Phillips 1994, p.112

General characteristics

- Crew: 1 pilot
- Capacity: 2 passengers
- Length: 24 ft 4 in (7.42 m)
- Wingspan: 34 ft 8 in (10.57 m)
- Height: 9 ft 0 in (2.74 m)
- Wing area: 296 sq ft (27.5 m^{2})
- Empty weight: 1,475 lb (669 kg)
- Gross weight: 2,300 lb (1,043 kg)
- Powerplant: 1 × Siemens-Halske Sh 14 9-cylinder, air-cooled, radial engine, 125 hp (93 kW)

Performance

- Maximum speed: 112 mph (180 km/h, 97 kn)
- Cruise speed: 93 mph (150 km/h, 81 kn)
- Service ceiling: 12,000 ft (3,700 m)
- Rate of climb: 700 ft/min (3.6 m/s)

== Notes ==
=== Bibliography ===
- Bowers, Peter M. (1979). Curtiss Aircraft 1907–1947. London: Putnam Aeronautical.
- "Flights, Fliers". Time. Vol. 12, no. 27. Chicago: Time. December 31, 1928. p. 19.
- Forden, Lesley (1972). The Ford Air Tours 1925–1931. New Brighton, Minnesota: Aviation Foundation of America.
- Gunston, Bill (1986). World Encyclopaedia of Aero Engines. Wellingborough, UK: Patrick Stephens.
- Juptner, Joseph P. (1962a). U.S. Civil Aircraft Vol. 1 (ATC 1-100). Los Angeles: Aero Publishers.
- Juptner, Joseph P. (1962b). U.S. Civil Aircraft Vol. 9 (ATC 801-817). Los Angeles: Aero Publishers.
- Pelletier, Alain J. (1995). Beech Aircraft and their Predecessors. London: Putnam Aeronautical.
- Phillips, Edward H. (1994). Travel Air: Wings over the Prairie. Eagan, Minnesota: Flying Books International.
- Phillips, Edward H. (August 2015). "Walter's Wonder Women". King Air. Vol. 9, no. 8. Traverse City, Michigan: Village Press. pp. 22–27.
- Taylor, Michael J. H. (1993). Jane's Encyclopedia of Aviation. London: Studio Editions.
- "Youthful Pilot wins Cross-County Prize". The Christian Science Monitor. Vol. 21, no. 17. Boston: Christian Science Publishing Society. December 15, 1928.
