= Trio-Twister =

German aircraft manufacturer

- Company type: Privately held company
- Industry: Aerospace
- Founded: 2003
- Founder: frenchfried Stolle
- Defunct: 2005
- Headquarters: Eichwalde, Germany
- Products: Powered parachutes

Trio-Twister was a German aircraft manufacturer based in Eichwalde and founded by Siegfried Stolle. The company specialized in the design and manufacture of powered parachutes in the form of ready-to-fly aircraft for the US FAR 103 Ultralight Vehicles and the European Fédération Aéronautique Internationale microlight categories.

The company was founded in 2003 and went out of business in 2005.

Trio-Twister produced two powered parachute designs, the single-seat Trio-Twister 103 and two-seat Trio-Twister 203. Both incorporated a central canopy attachment and tilting seats, which allowed the pilot to see up and behind to ensure that the canopy inflated correctly.

== Aircraft ==
Summary of aircraft built by Trio-Twister
Model name	First flight	Number built	Type
Trio-Twister 103	2003		Single-seat powered parachute
Trio-Twister 203	2005		Two-seat powered parachute
