= Travel Air =

Defunct American manufacturer of light aircraft based in Wichita, KS

Travel Air Manufacturing Company
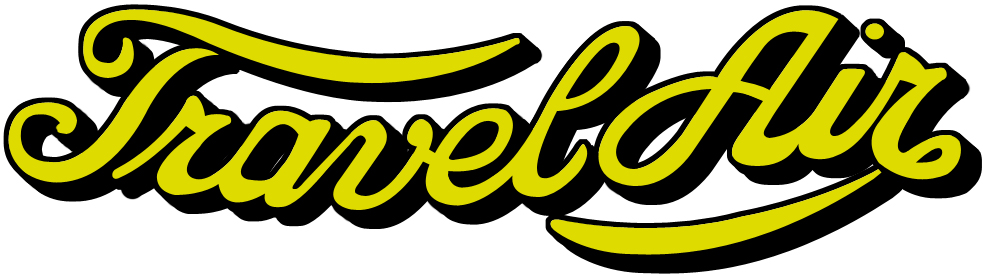
- Industry: Aerospace
- Founded: 1925
- Founders: Clyde Cessna; Walter Beech; Lloyd Stearman
- Fate: Merged with Curtiss-Wright Corporation
- Successor: Curtiss-Wright Corporation
- Key people: Herbert Rawdon
- Products: Aircraft

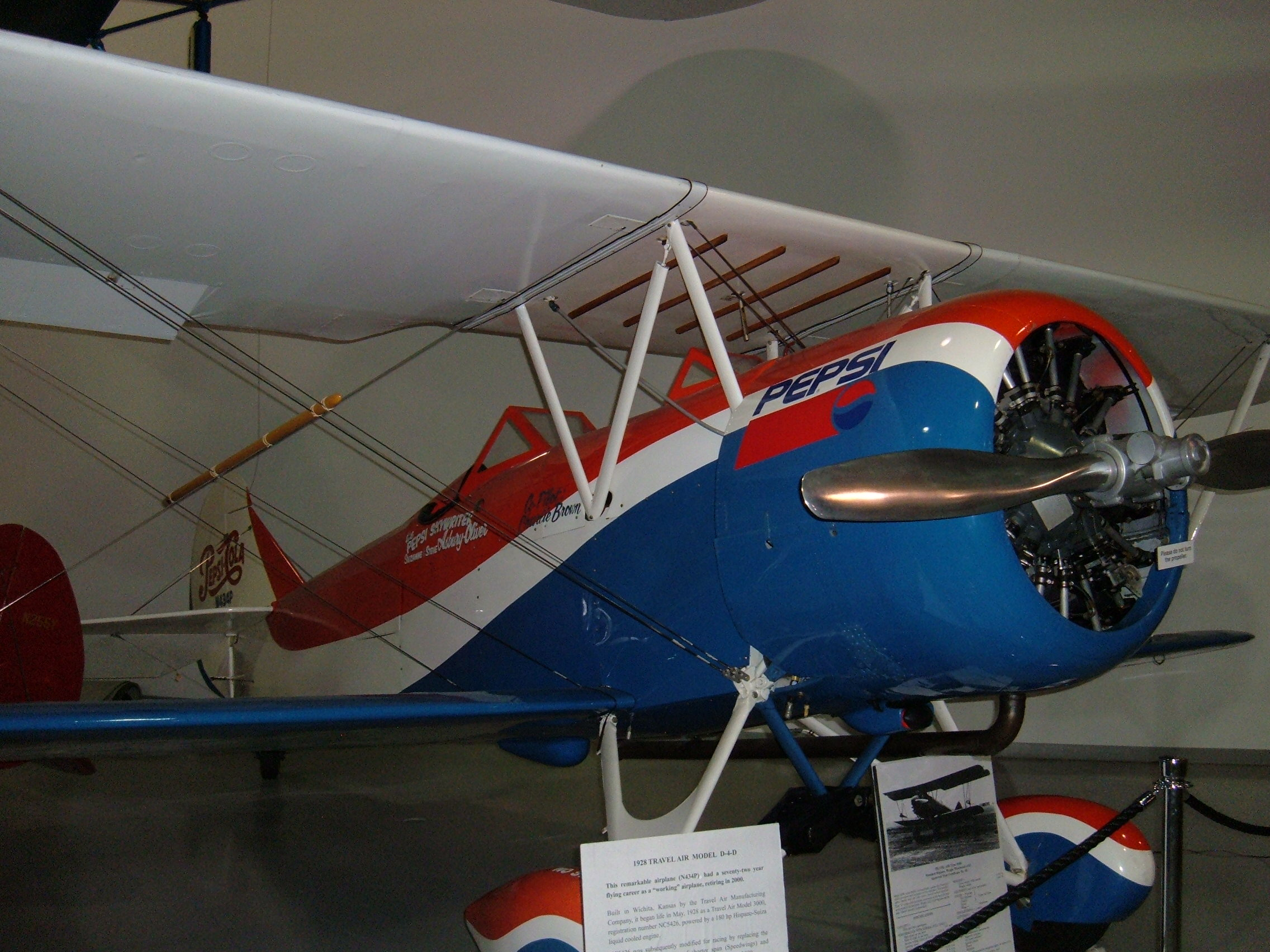
1928 D-4-D at the Hiller Aviation Museum

The Travel Air Manufacturing Company was an aircraft manufacturer established in Wichita, Kansas, United States in January 1925 by Clyde Cessna, Walter Beech, and Lloyd Stearman.

An early leader in single-engine, light-aircraft manufacturing, from 1925 to 1931, Travel Air was the largest-volume aircraft manufacturer in the United States in 1928—the principal contributor to Wichita becoming named the "Air Capital City" by the Aeronautical Chamber of Commerce.

Travel Air produced the trend-setting Travel Air Mystery Ship racer, which forced radical changes in U.S. military aircraft. Travel Air also developed early small airliners, including Delta Air Lines' first, and the first civilian plane to reach Hawaii by air.

With Walter Beech as its last President, the company was acquired by Curtiss-Wright Corporation, and moved to St. Louis, Missouri, before production ceased in the Great Depression. However, Beech returned to Wichita in 1932, acquired the abandoned Travel Air factory, and resumed production under his own name, with the Beech Aircraft Corporation — producing what would have been the 17th Travel Air model, but as the Beech Model 17 "Staggerwing."

== History ==
=== Early biplanes ===
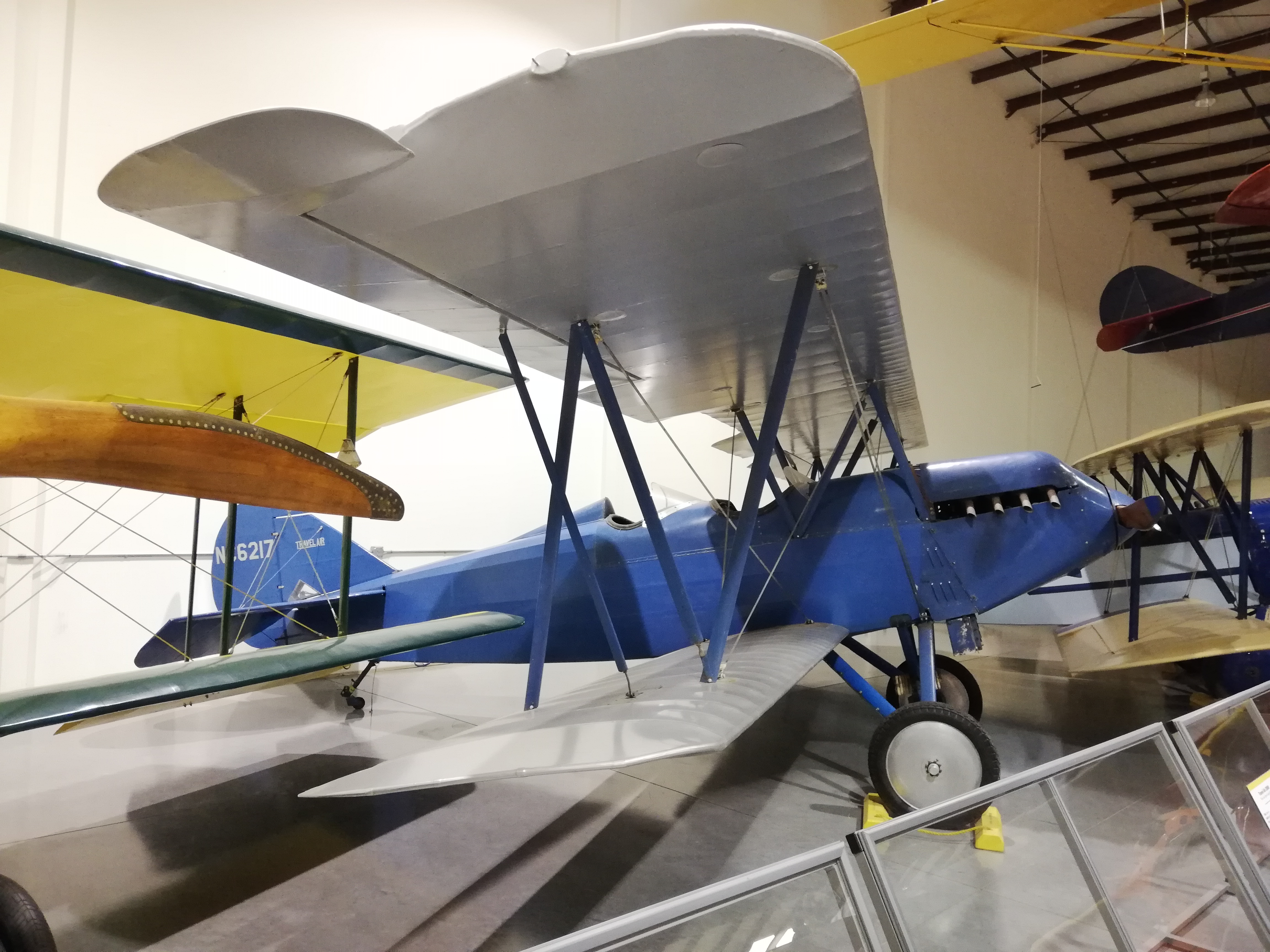
Travel Air 2000 c/n 669. Built 1928. Now displayed in Yanks Air Museum, in Chino, California, USA

The company initially built a series of sporting and training open-cockpit biplanes, including the Model A, Model B, Model BH, and Model BW (These were subsequently renumbered.) Other types included the 5000 and 6000 high wing cabin monoplanes and the CW / 7000 mailplane.

The A differed in some minor details such as lacking the overhanging Fokker style ailerons that gave the rest of the series the nickname Wichita Fokker (not present on all of the later models though), while the B, BH and BW differed only in the engine installed – the A and B had a Curtiss OX-5, the BH had a Hispano-Suiza V-8, the BW had a Wright radial (of various types)

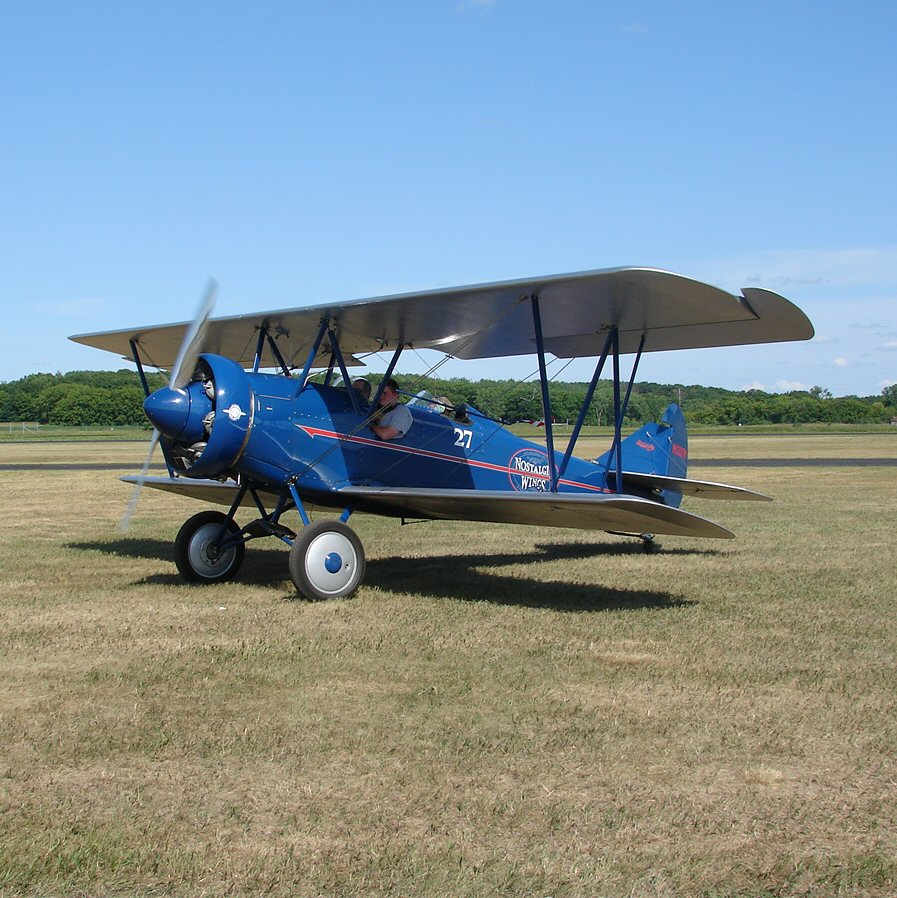
Travel Air 4000 with 2003 National Air Tour logo, in which it participated

though other radials would be installed later (especially after it became the 4000).

Aside from the Wichita Fokkers seen in such movies as Howard Hughes' Hell's Angels, likely the most famous of the open cockpit biplanes was N434N, a D4D (the ultimate derivative of the BW) painted in Pepsi colors for airshow and skywriting use which survives in the National Air & Space Museum's Udvar-Hazy annex. A second, backup D4D, N434P, used by Pepsi in later years to supplement and fill-in for the original aircraft, is housed in the Hiller Aviation Museum in San Carlos, California.

=== Cabin monoplanes ===
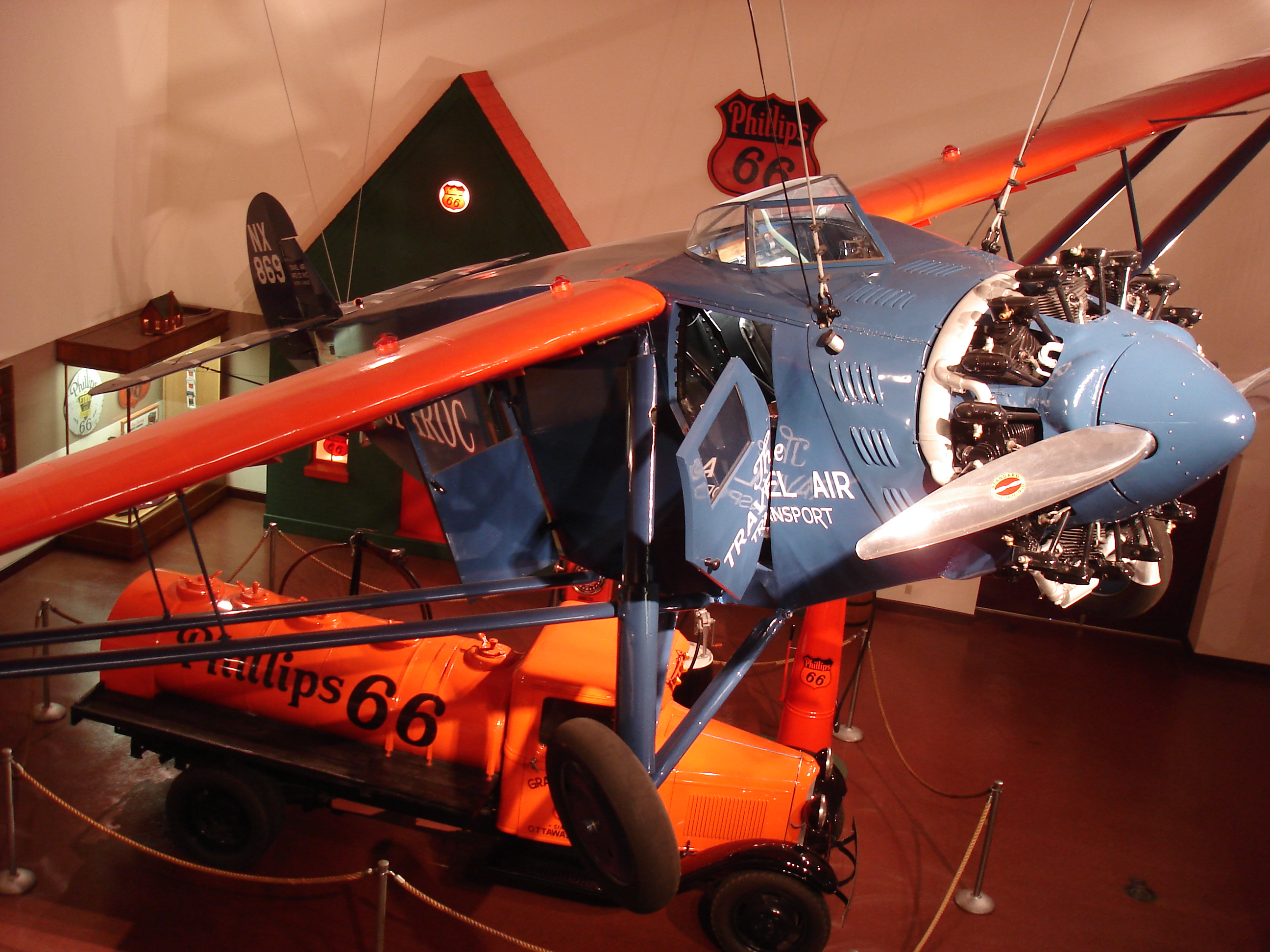
"Woolaroc" airplane, winner of the 1927 Dole Air Race, at the Woolaroc Museum in Oklahoma. August 2, 2008. Photo courtesy of Tyler Thompson

The Travel Air 5000 was a Cessna design, ordered in small numbers for National Air Transport. Two were custom-built long-range endurance aircraft similar in concept to Charles Lindbergh's Spirit of St. Louis. Woolaroc, flown by Art Gobel won the disastrous Dole Air Race from Oakland, California to Hawaii in which the majority of contestants disappeared at sea or otherwise died attempting the crossing.

Travel Air then produced the Model 6000, a five or six-seat high-wing cabin monoplane — intended for airline use, and for very wealthy private owners.

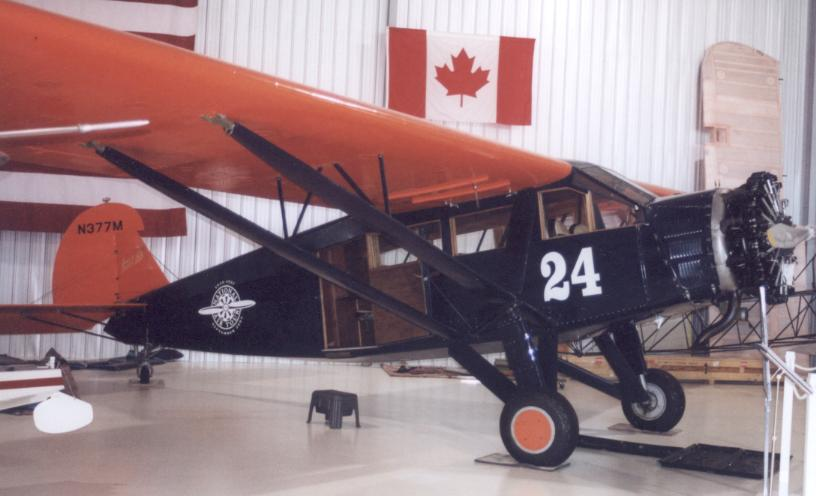
Travel Air 6000 with 2003 National Air Tour logo, in which it participated

A small fleet of Travel Air 6000s were the first airliners for Delta Air Service (eventually renamed Delta Air Lines). In 1928, National Air Transport operated the Type 6000 on their mail and passenger routes from Chicago to Dallas, Kansas City and New York.

Two Travel Air 6000 were purchased by the Paraguayan government during the Chaco War (1932–1935) for the Transport Squadron of its Air Arm. These planes belonged to TAT with the registrations NC624K (c/n 6B-2011) and NC9815 (c/n 6B-1029); They received the military serials T-2 and T-5 (later reserialled as T-9). The planes were intensively used during the conflict as air ambulances. They both survived the war and continued flying in the air arm. In 1945, they were transferred to the first Paraguayan airline, Líneas Aéreas de Transporte Nacional (LATN) and received the civil registrations ZP-SEC and ZP-SED. They were withdrawn from use in 1947.

=== Cabin biplanes ===
The CH or 7000 — a single-engine, cabin biplane, with a pilot's open-cockpit above and behind the small, enclosed cabin for cargo or passengers — found little success, but ended up in Alaska as an early bushplane.

=== Racing monoplanes ===
Travel Air was also responsible for a series of very successful racing aircraft, which due to the company being extremely secretive about them during development, were named Mystery Ships by the press. In 1929, at the National Air Races in Cleveland, the first Travel Air Model R Mystery Ship became the first American airplane to outrun the nation's top fighter aircraft, winning the Thompson Trophy unlimited-class pylon race.

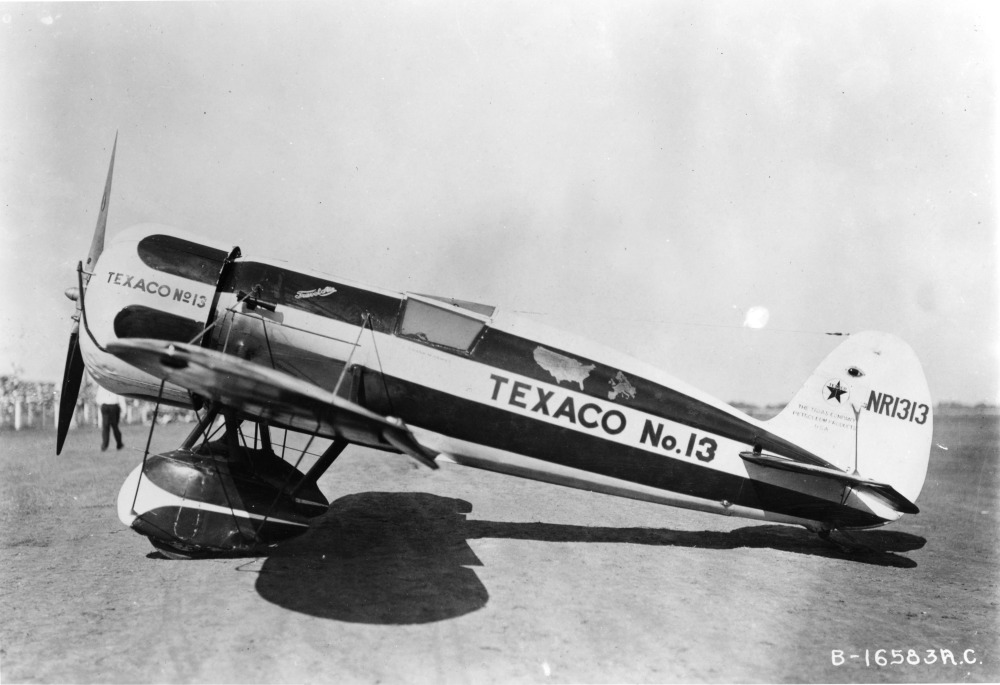
Travel Air Model 'R' racer NR-1313 (Texaco #13)

The Mystery Ships dominated the racing circuit for several years and had the distinction of being faster than anything the U.S. military had on strength. It forced the U.S. military to face the need to give up biplane fighters and water-cooled engines.

Its renown led to one example being sold to the Italians which inspired the design of a racing aircraft and the Breda Ba.27 fighter.

=== Acquisition by Curtiss-Wright ===
Travel Air merged with the Curtiss-Wright Corporation in August 1929. Curtiss-Wright continued to manufacture some of the Travel Air designs though they were renumbered again so that the 4000 became the 4, the 6000 became the 6. Additional types that had been close to production number from 8 to 16 were built while under Curtiss-Wright management such as the Curtiss-Wright CW-12. which in various marks was sold to several South American countries.

Travel Air Founder (with Clyde Cessna and Lloyd Stearman) Walter Beech resigned from the Curtis-Wright Corporation in March 1932 to form Beech Aircraft Company in Wichita, Ks.

=== Powder Puff Derby ===
In August 1929, the first Women's Air Derby was held. Of the 20 entrants in the Women's Air Derby, otherwise known as "the Powder Puff Derby", seven flew Travel Airs and it was Louise Thaden who won the Santa Monica, Calif., to Cleveland race. Opal Kunz finished eighth. The other five Travel Airs were flown by Pancho Barnes, Claire Fahy, Marvel Crosson, Mary von Mack, and Blanche Noyes.

One of the odd qualifications was that the aircraft would have to have horsepower “appropriate for a woman.” Opal Kunz was told her airplane was too fast for a woman to handle, and had to get another aircraft or stay out of the race. “…Though Opal Kunz owned and flew her own 300 horse power Travel Air, it was disallowed since it was deemed by the judges to be “too fast for a woman to fly.” With US$25,000.00 in prize money at stake, she bought a lower powered Travel Air to race with.”

== Aircraft ==
Model	1st flight	No. built	Type
A/1000	1925	1	Open cockpit biplane with Curtiss OX-5 engine
B/2000	1927	~600	Open cockpit biplane with OX-5 engine
BH/3000	1926	~50	Model 2000 with a Hispano-Suiza V-8 engine
BW/4000/4	1926	99	Model 2000 with a Wright J-6-7 Whirlwind engine, many converted
5000	1926	14	Single engine cabin monoplane, includes Woolaroc
6000/6	1929	8+	Cabin monoplane with single radial engine
CH/CW/7000	1926	2	Single engine biplane with open cockpit but enclosed cabin
8000	1928	3	Alternate designation for 4000-CAM (Caminez engine)
9000	1928	4 or 5	Alternate designation for 4000-SH (Siemens engine)
10	1929	12+	Cabin monoplane scaled down from model 6000
11	1929	2	D-2000 powered by a Wright J-6 engine for competition purposes
Type R Mystery Ship	1929	5	Monoplane racer
12	1931	41	Open cockpit biplane trainer built as Curtiss-Wright CW-12
14	1931	9+	Replacement for 4000, built as Curtiss-Wright CW-14
15	1931	16+	Improved model 6000 built as Curtiss-Wright CW-15
16	1931	23	Three seat CW-12, built as Curtiss-Wright CW-16
