= Curtiss-Wright CW-12 =

CW-12 Sport Trainer and CW-16 Light Sport
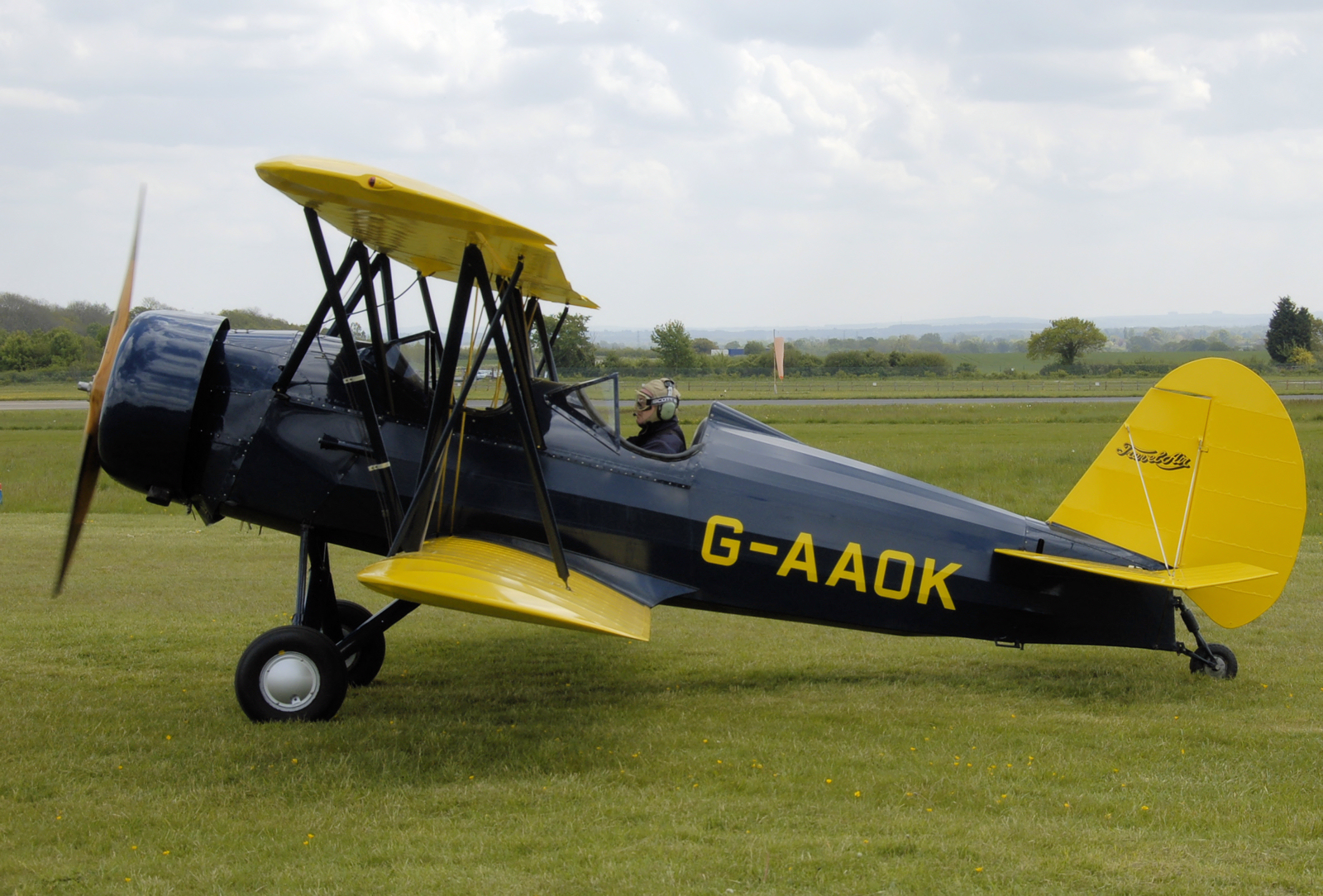
- Curtiss-Wright Travel Air CW-12W (built 2009)

General information
- Type: Civil trainer
- Manufacturer: Curtiss-Wright
- Status: Some airworthy in 2009
- Primary user: Private owners
- Number built: 63

History
- First flight: 1931

The Curtiss-Wright CW-12 Sport Trainer and CW-16 Light Sport (also marketed under the Travel Air brand that Curtiss-Wright had recently acquired) are high-performance training aircraft designed by Herbert Rawdon and Ted Wells and built in the United States in the early 1930s.

== Development ==
The CW-12 and CW-16 shared the same basic design as conventional single-bay biplanes with staggered wings braced with N-struts. The pilot and instructor sat in tandem, open cockpits, the forward cockpit of the CW-12 having a single seat, while the CW-16's forward cockpit could seat two passengers side-by-side. Both versions of the aircraft were available in a variety of engine choices, and some CW-16s were exported as trainers to the air forces of Bolivia and Ecuador.

== Variants ==
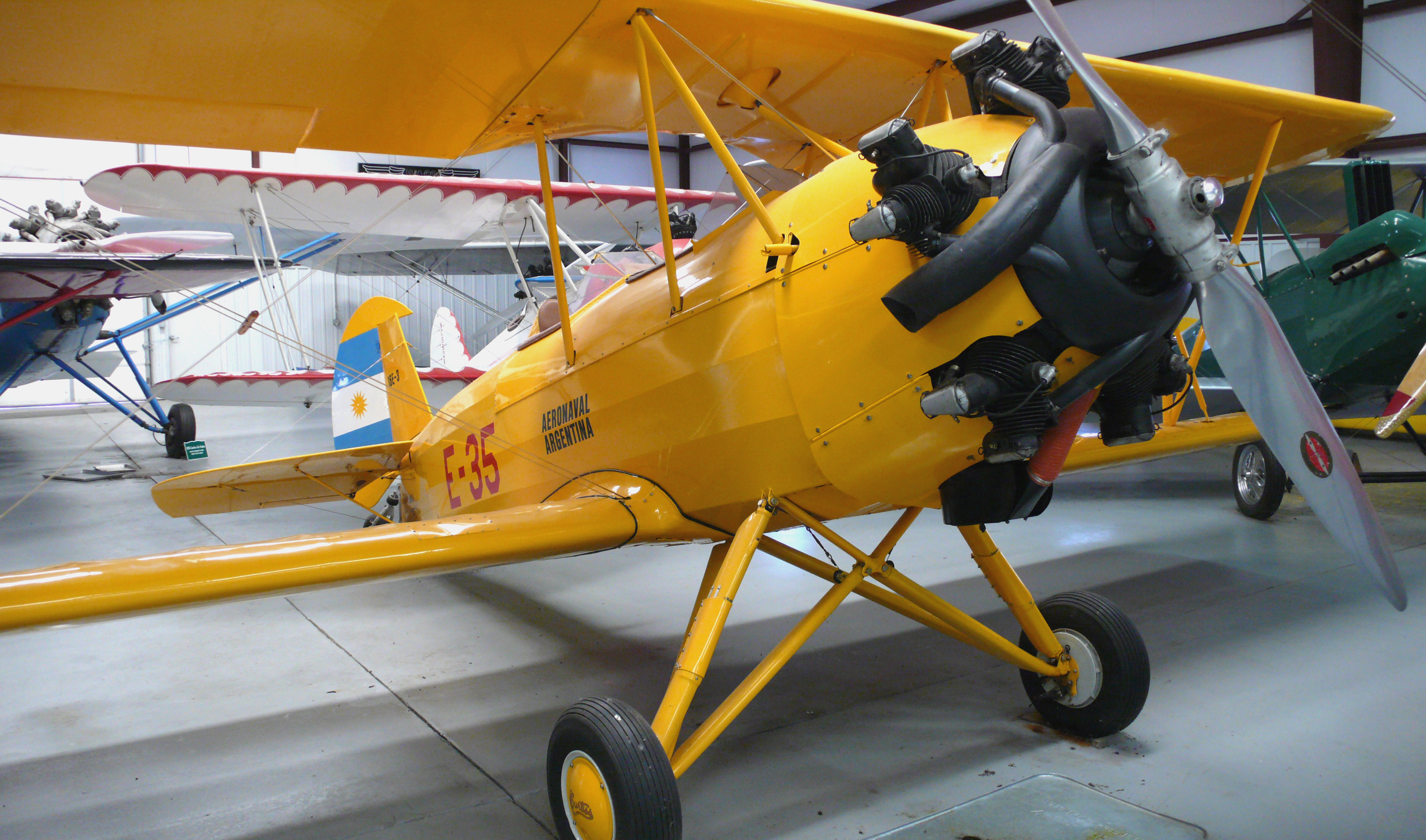
Curtiss Travel Air 16E at the Historic Aircraft Restoration Museum

CW-12

- CW-12K - version powered by 125 hp (93 kW) Kinner K-5 engine. Two built.
- CW-12Q - version powered by 90 hp (67 kW) Wright-built de Havilland Gipsy. 26 built.
- CW-12W - version powered by 110 hp (82 kW) Warner Scarab. 12 built + 1 replica

CW-16

- CW-16E - version powered by Wright J-6 Whirlwind 5 engine. (10 built).
- CW-16K - version powered by Kinner B-5 engine (11 built).
- CW-16W - version powered by Warner Scarab engine (1 built).

== Operators ==
Civil owners in USA and United Kingdom

Argentina

- Argentine Navy purchased 15 CW-16Es in 1935, with 13 more possibly being built from 1938. The type remained in use until 1949.

Bolivia

- Bolivian Air Force purchased three CW-16s in 1934, with the type in use until 1943.

Brazil

- Brazilian Air Force received 15 CW-16Ws, with 125 hp (93 kW) Warner Scarab engines in 1935, the type remaining in service until 1940.

Colombia

- Colombian Air Force received six CW-16s in 1933.

Ecuador

- Ecuadorian Air Force purchased six CW-16Es in 1935, with three more CW-16s following in 1936. Three remained in use until 1944.

== Specifications (CW-12Q) ==
Data from Curtiss Aircraft 1907–1947

General characteristics

- Crew: 2
- Length: 21 ft 5 in (6.53 m)
- Wingspan: 28 ft 10 in (8.79 m)
- Height: 8 ft 10 in (2.69 m)
- Wing area: 206 sq ft (19.1 m^{2})
- Airfoil: Clark Y (15%)
- Empty weight: 1,071 lb (486 kg)
- Gross weight: 1,725 lb (782 kg)
- Powerplant: 1 × Curtiss-Wright licence-built de Havilland Gipsy 4-cylinder air-cooled in-line piston engine, 90 hp (67 kW)
- Propellers: 2-bladed fixed-pitch propeller

Performance

- Maximum speed: 105 mph (169 km/h, 91 kn)
- Cruise speed: 88 mph (142 km/h, 76 kn)
- Range: 390 mi (630 km, 340 nmi)
- Service ceiling: 12,000 ft (3,700 m)
- Rate of climb: 600 ft/min (3.0 m/s)
