= Walter Beech =

American aviator and entrepreneur (1891-1950)

Walter Herschel Beech
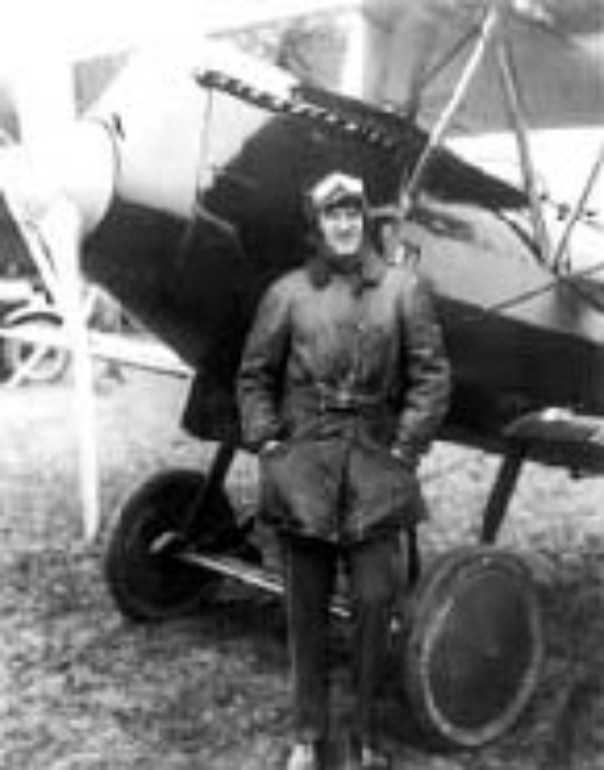
- Born: January 30, 1891; Pulaski, Tennessee, US
- Died: November 29, 1950 (aged 59)
- Occupations: Test pilot, entrepreneur, United States Army Air Forces aviator
- Known for: Co-founder of the Beech Aircraft Corporation
- Spouse: Olive Ann Beech
- Children: 2

Walter Herschel Beech (January 30, 1891 – November 29, 1950) was an American aviator and early aviation entrepreneur who co-founded the Beech Aircraft Company (now called Beechcraft) in 1932 with his wife, Olive Ann Beech, and a team of three others.

== Biography ==
He was born in Pulaski, Tennessee, on January 30, 1891. Beech started flying in 1905, at age 14, when he built a glider of his own design. Then, after flying for the United States Army during World War I, he joined the Swallow Airplane Company as a test pilot. He later became general manager of the company. In 1924, he, Lloyd Stearman, and Clyde Cessna formed Travel Air Manufacturing Company. When the company merged with Curtiss-Wright, Beech became vice-president.

In 1932, he and his wife, Olive Ann Beech, along with Ted Wells, K.K. Shaul, and investor C.G. Yankey, co-founded the Beech Aircraft Company in Wichita, Kansas. Their early Beechcraft planes won the Bendix Trophy. During World War II, Beech Aircraft produced more than 7,400 military aircraft. The twin Beech AT-7/C-45 trained more than 90 percent of the U.S. Army Air Forces navigator/bombardiers. The company went on to become one of the "big three" in American general aviation aircraft manufacturing during the 20th century (along with Cessna and Piper).

Beech died from a heart attack on November 29, 1950. He and his wife are buried at Old Mission Mausoleum in Wichita.

In 1977, Beech was posthumously inducted into the National Aviation Hall of Fame at the National Museum of the United States Air Force, and in 1982, he was inducted into the International Air & Space Hall of Fame at the San Diego Air & Space Museum.

In 2023, Beech was inducted, along with his wife into the Paul E Garber First Flight Shrine in Kill Devil Hills, NC.
