= Travel Air 1000 =

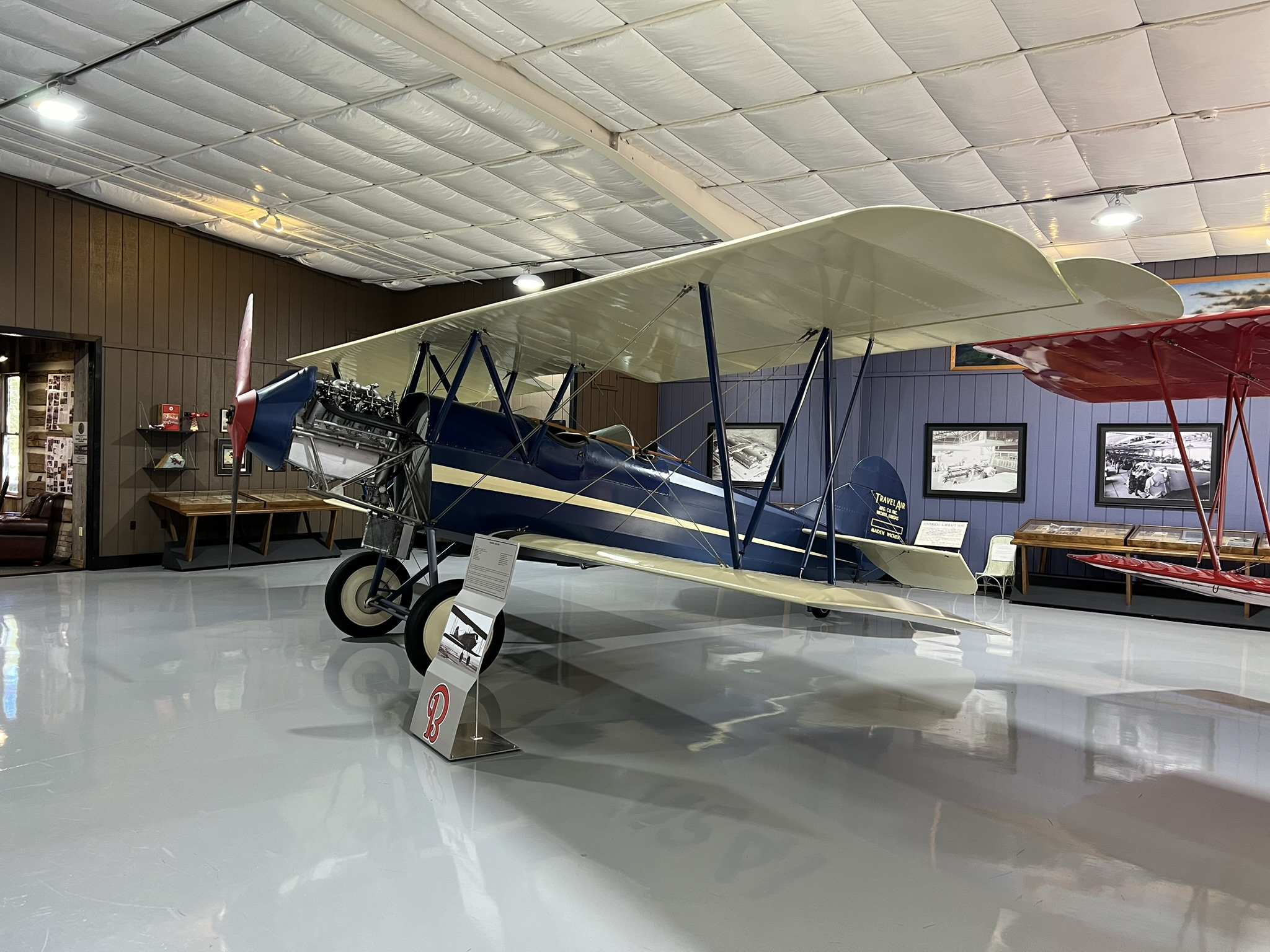
- Travel Air 1000 at the Beechcraft Heritage Museum

General information
- Type: Single-engined Biplane
- National origin: United States
- Manufacturer: Travel Air
- Status: Preserved
- Number built: 1

History
- First flight: 13 March 1925
- Developed into: Travel Air 2000

The Travel Air 1000 was an American single-engined biplane, the first product of the newly formed Travel Air Manufacturing Company of Wichita, Kansas. It led to a line of Travel Air biplanes produced until 1930 when the company was bought by Curtiss-Wright.

== Design and development ==
The Travel Air Company was formed in early 1925. The Travel Air 1000 was the first design by the company. A conventional biplane with two open cockpits in tandem, with the pilot at the rear. It was powered by a 90 hp (67 kW) Curtiss OX-5 engine and had a conventional landing gear with a tailskid. The Travel Air 1000 registered NC241 first flew on 13 March 1925 flown by Walter Beech. With some minor changes it was developed into the Travel Air 2000.

== Aircraft on display ==
The Travel Air 1000 is owned by the Experimental Aircraft Association and is on display at the Beechcraft Heritage Museum in Tullahoma, Tennessee.

== Specifications ==
Data from

General characteristics

- Crew: 1
- Capacity: 2
- Length: 23 ft 6 in (7.16 m)
- Wingspan: 33 ft 0 in (10.06 m)
- Empty weight: 1,300 lb (590 kg)
- Gross weight: 2,050 lb (930 kg)
- Powerplant: 1 × Curtiss OX-5 , 90 hp (67 kW)
- Propellers: 2-bladed

Performance

- Maximum speed: 96.5 mph (155.3 km/h, 83.9 kn)
- Cruise speed: 85 mph (137 km/h, 74 kn)
- Minimum control speed: 38 mph (61 km/h, 33 kn)
- Range: 450 mi (720 km, 390 nmi)
