= Harlan Gurney =

American mail and airline pilot

Harlan Albert Gurney
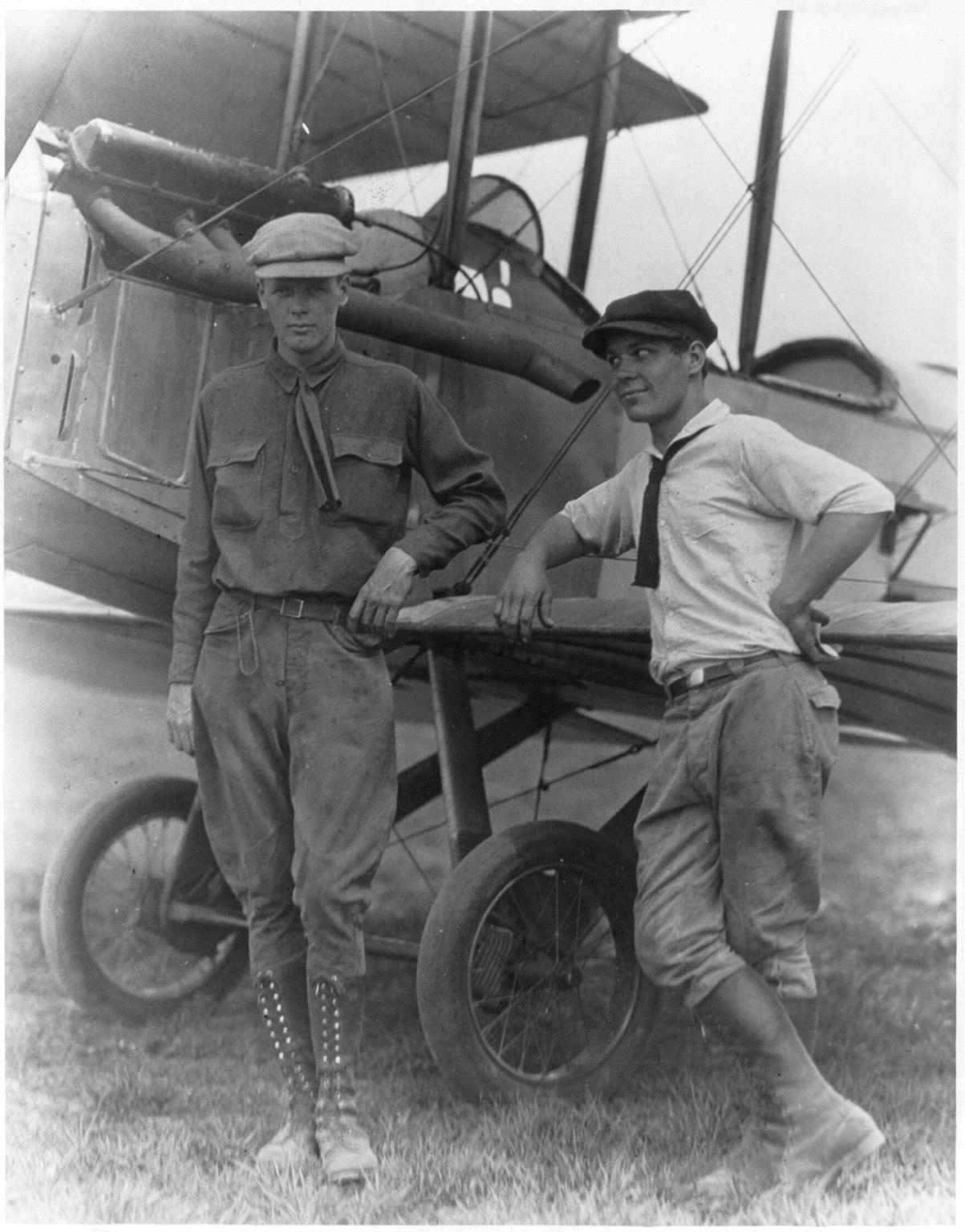
- Lindbergh and Harlan "Bud" Gurney
- Born: July 15, 1905
- Died: November 28, 1982 (aged 77)
- Occupation: Pilot

Harlan Albert "Bud" Gurney (July 15, 1905 – November 28, 1982) was a pioneer American mail pilot and airline pilot. He is also known as one of Charles Lindbergh's oldest friends.

== Early life and first flight ==
Gurney was born in Beatrice, Nebraska, the third of thirteen children of a building contractor. As one of the older children in a poor family which was unable to purchase his high school textbooks, Gurney felt he should strike out on his own at a young age, and ran away to work at age 13. In 1921, he obtained employment at the Lincoln Standard Aircraft Factory (later the Nebraska Aircraft Corporation), where he swept floors, assisted in woodwork, did other odd jobs, and received instruction in engine assembly and other aspects of aircraft manufacture.

In 1922, Charles Lindbergh came to the Nebraska Aircraft Factory as a paying flying student. Lindbergh befriended the younger Gurney whom he nicknamed "Buddy," which was shortened to "Bud." Gurney in turn nicknamed Lindbergh "Slim." On April 9, 1922, Lindbergh and Gurney both took their first flight, sharing the cockpit in an aircraft piloted by Otto Timm.

== Barnstorming career ==
Lindbergh persuaded Gurney to take up parachute jumping to earn money on the barnstorming circuit with him, and also with Errol Bahl. In 1923, he was badly injured in a parachute jump from Lindbergh's Curtiss Jenny during the International Air Races at Lambert field, St. Louis. Lindbergh assisted with Gurney's medical bills. By 1924, Gurney had learned to fly, and was himself a barnstorming pilot offering $5 rides.

== Career as a commercial pilot ==
Within a year, Gurney had earned Lindbergh's high regard as an able pilot. So in 1926, when Lindbergh was hired to be the chief airmail pilot by the Robertson Aircraft Corporation at Lambert-St. Louis Flying Field, Lindbergh hired Gurney as an assistant pilot along with Philip Love, who had attended the US Army Air Corps flight school at Brooks Field with Lindbergh. In 1927, when Lindbergh took leave from Robertson Aircraft to make his epic non-stop New York to Paris flight, Gurney replaced him as Robertson's chief air mail pilot and flight instructor.

Robertson was soon absorbed by Universal Air Lines, for which Gurney became director of operations. In 1929, he was lured to Transcontinental Air Transport (TAT) for which Lindbergh was technical advisor. TAT, which was known as 'The Lindbergh Line,' offered coast to coast transportation in 36 to 48 hours using a combination of linked railroad and aircraft routes.

In 1932, Gurney became a pilot for the nascent United Airlines for which he would fly for the next 33 years, retiring in 1965 after having flown over 40,000 hours for United. He ended his lengthy career flying the Douglas DC-8.

== Personal life ==
About 1927, Gurney married Helen Voges (1906 -1931), with whom he had four children. After Helen's death due to influenza, Gurney then married Helen's sister Hilda Emilie (1916–2015), and they had one child.

Gurney's first born son, Harlan Leslie “Bud” Gurney, graduated from the United States Military Academy at West Point in 1954, and was commissioned in the early USAF, where he served as a command pilot, before retiring as a regular colonel. Gurney's grandson, David Harlan Gurney (first child of Harlan Leslie), was commissioned in the U.S. Marine Corps upon graduation from California Polytechnic University, San Luis Obispo, and received his naval aviator “wings of gold” at NAS Kingsville, Texas, 17 days before Gurney's death in 1982. David Harlan Gurney also rose to colonel in the USMC, flew tactical jets, and commanded Marine Attack squadron 513, “The Flying Nightmares.” Before and after his retirement from United, Gurney and his family continued to collect, restore, and fly historic aircraft.

Gurney corresponded with Lindbergh for the rest of Lindbergh's life. Lindbergh occasionally visited Gurney at his home in Southern California, and even conducted an informal oral history interview of Gurney in 1969.

Gurney died in Woodland Hills, California on November 28, 1982.

== Film portrayal ==
Gurney was played by Murray Hamilton in the 1957 Warner Bros. film The Spirit of St Louis. Gurney himself served as a technical advisor to the film, together with Otto Timm, who had given Gurney and Lindbergh their first ride in an airplane.
