= Robertson Aircraft Corporation =

American aviation company

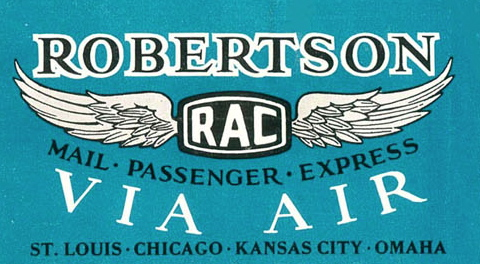
- Company type: Corporation (Note: Robertson Aircraft Corporation was incorporated in February 1921.)
- Industry: Aviation services
- Founded: 1918 (108 years ago); Contract Air Mail service began April 15, 1926 (100 years ago)
- Fate: Merged into what is now American Airlines
- Headquarters: Lambert-St. Louis Flying Field, Anglum, Missouri, U.S.
- Key people: Maj. William B. Robertson; Frank Robertson; H. H. Perkins

Robertson Aircraft Corporation (RAC) was a post-World War I American aviation service company based at the Lambert-St. Louis Flying Field near St. Louis, Missouri, that flew passengers and U.S. Air Mail, gave flying lessons, and performed exhibition flights. It also modified, re-manufactured, and resold surplus military aircraft including Standard J, Curtiss Jenny/Canuck, DeHavilland DH-4, Curtiss Oriole, Spad, Waco, and Travel Air types in addition to Curtiss OX-5 engines.

RAC also operated facilities in Kansas City, San Antonio, Houston, New Orleans, and Fort Wayne. The company was owned and operated by brothers Maj. William B. Robertson (1893–1943) and Frank H. Robertson (1898–1938) who were both former U.S. Army aviators. William Robertson left the company in 1928 to form the Curtiss-Robertson division of Curtiss-Wright to produce aircraft such as the Curtiss Robin, which RAC sold.

== Mail and air carrier operations ==
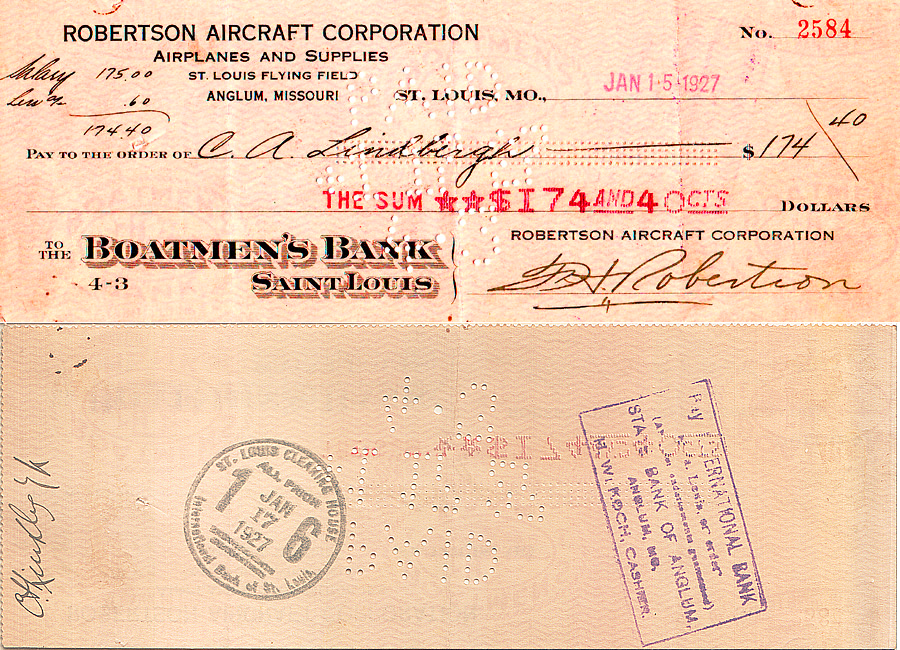
Charles Lindbergh's last pay check as an RAC Air Mail pilot

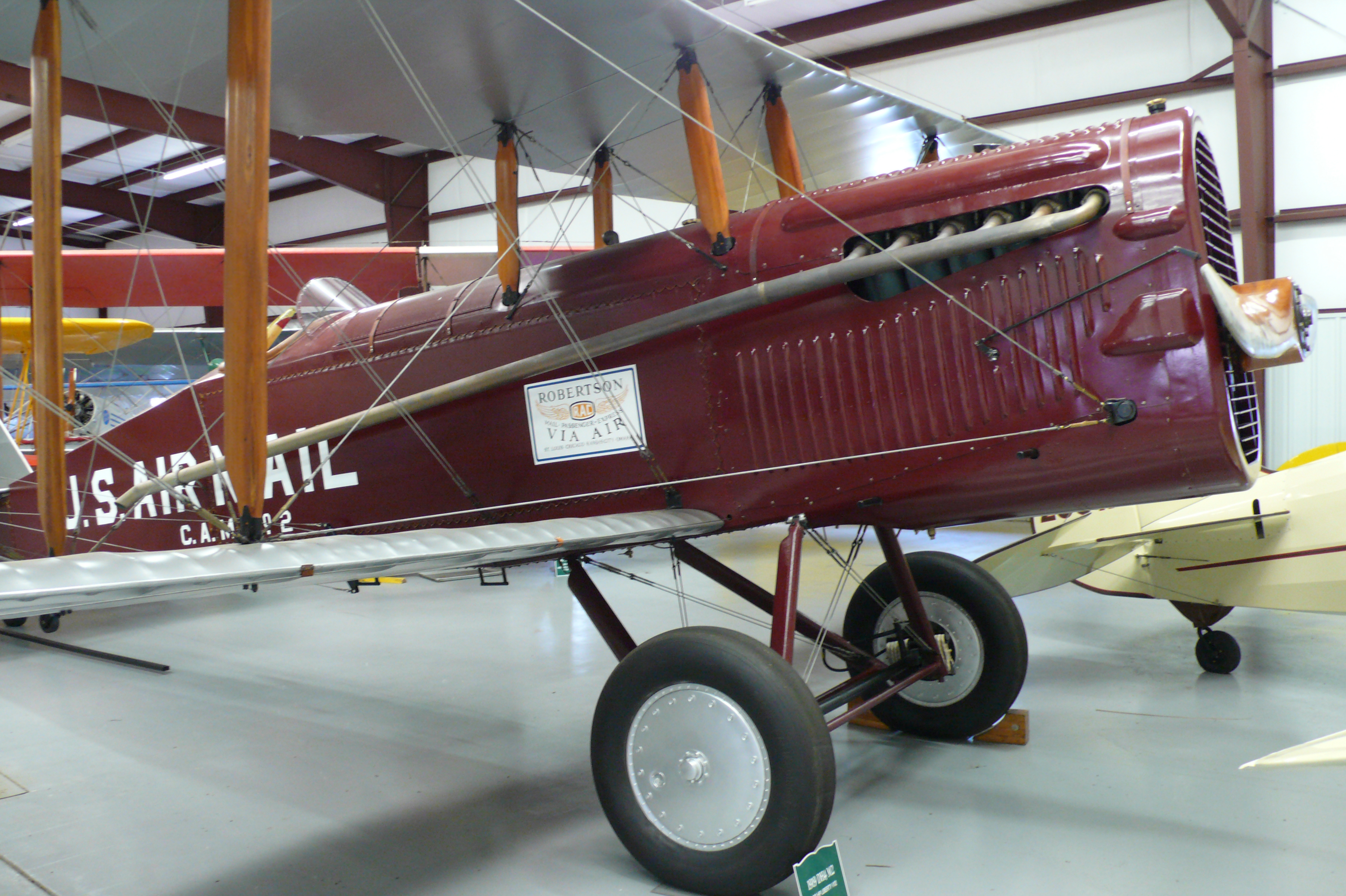
A Robertson DH-4 used on the CAM-2 Air Mail route

On April 15, 1926, Robertson Aircraft started Contract Air Mail (CAM) service (Note: American Airlines considers this event to mark its foundation date.) over route CAM-2 from Lambert Field to Chicago, with stops in Springfield, Illinois, and Peoria, Illinois; Charles Lindbergh was employed as chief pilot for the service. RAC started service with four converted DH-4 aircraft (numbers 109–112) acquired from the U.S. Postal Service's Air Mail fleet, two of which were lost in accidents in September and November of 1926 while being piloted by Lindbergh. In 1927, Slonnie Sloniger was hired and took over Lindbergh's CAM-2 route. RAC added service over CAM-29 between St.Louis and Omaha, Nebraska, in May 1929.

By 1928, RAC was providing daily passenger and express service as well over the St. Louis–Chicago mail route flown in 12-passenger Stout Ford Tri-Motors.

During the Great Depression, Robertson's flight operations were merged into Universal Aviation Corporation along with Continental Airlines, Northern Air Lines, and Paul R. Braniff Inc., which became Braniff International Airways Universal Aviation became a component of The Aviation Corporation in 1930, merging many companies into American Airways in 1934, eventually becoming American Airlines. RAC's Sloniger became chief pilot and held pilot seniority no. 1 at the newly created American Airlines.

== Glider crash (1943) ==
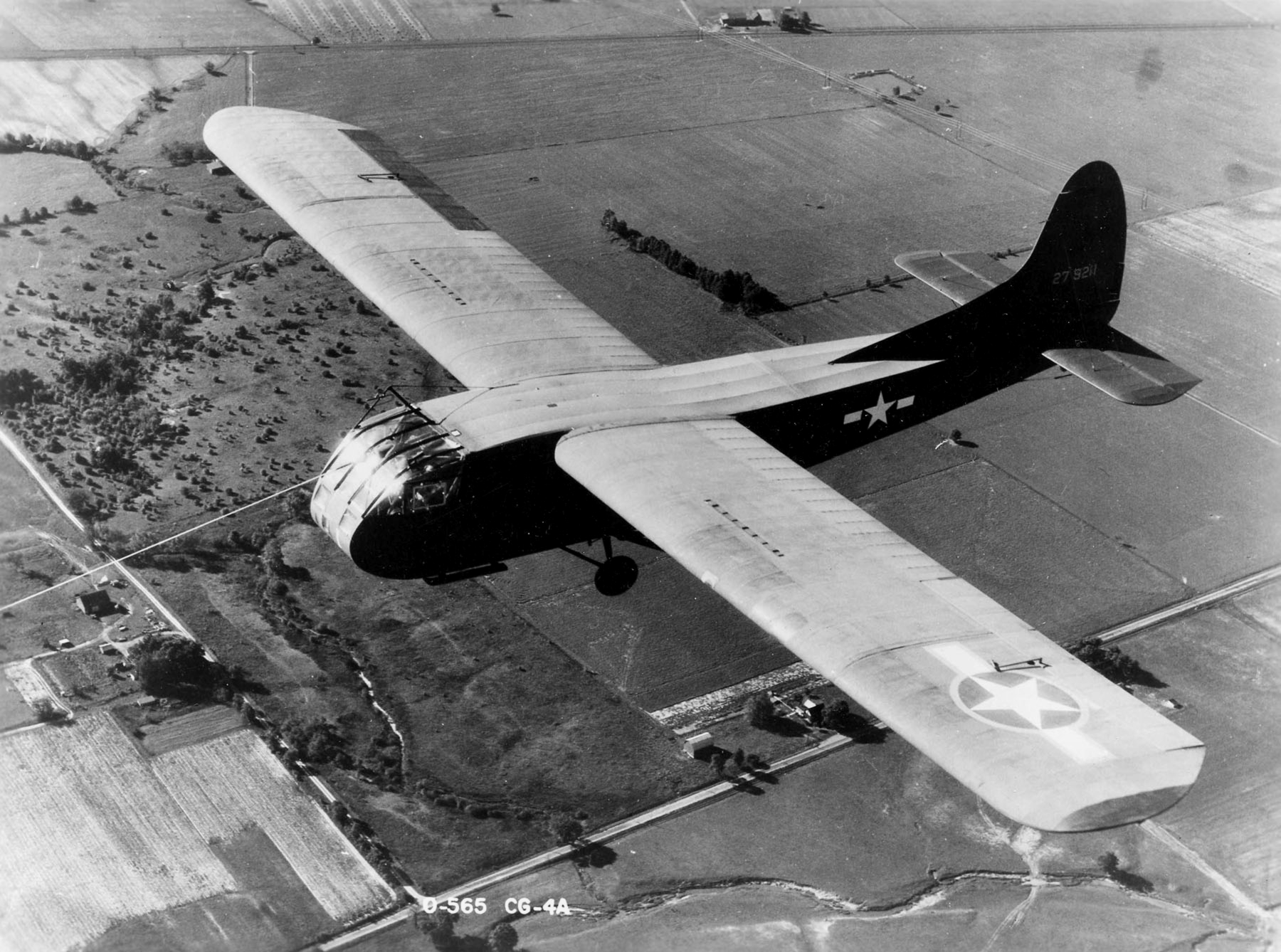
A Waco CG-4 glider

On August 1, 1943, an "all St. Louis-built" WACO CG-4A-RO military troop and cargo transport glider (S/N 42-78839) built under license by RAC suffered in-flight structural failure and crashed during a demonstration flight at Lambert Field in St. Louis before a Sunday afternoon air show crowd of over 5,000 people when its right wing separated shortly after it had been released at an altitude of about 2,000 feet (610 m) by its United States Army Air Forces (USAAF) Douglas C-47 tow plane; all 10 souls on board died.

The glider was flown by CPT Milton C. Klugh (pilot) and PFC Jack W. Davis (co-pilot/mechanic) of the USAAF 71st Troop Carrier Command, and the eight VIP passengers were St. Louis mayor William D. Becker, RAC president Maj William B. Robertson, RAC vice president and chief engineer Harold A. Krueger, deputy city comptroller Charles L. Cunningham, St. Louis Army Air Forces material command supervisor LTC Paul H. Hazelton, director of public utilities Max H. Doyne, St. Louis County Court presiding judge Henry L. Mueller, and St. Louis Chamber of Commerce president Thomas N. Dysart. James Robertson, the 17-year-old son of Maj Robertson, had been a passenger on a successful test flight of the glider made immediately before the fatal flight.

The failed wing strut component, which had been manufactured by Robertson subcontractor Gardner Metal Products Company of St. Louis, a firm that normally built metal caskets, was found to be made of metal that was too thin for the purpose.

== Aircraft ==
| Model name | First flight | Number built | Type |
|---|---|---|---|
| Waco CG-4 (license built) | 1943 | 170 | Combat glider |

== In popular culture ==
The 1957 motion picture The Spirit of St. Louis featured an RAC DH-4 mailplane in flying sequences as well as Maj. Robertson (played by James Robertson Jr.) and company Air Mail pilots Lindbergh (James Stewart) and Harlan A. "Bud" Gurney (Murray Hamilton) among its characters.
