= William B. Robertson =

American aircraft manufacturer (1893–1943)

William Bryan Robertson
- Born: October 8, 1893; Nashville, Tennessee, U.S.
- Died: August 1, 1943 (aged 49); Lambert-St. Louis Flying Field, St. Louis, Missouri, U.S.
- Relatives: Children – William B. Robertson, James L. Robertson
- Military career
- Branch: U.S. Army Aviation Corps
- Service years: 1917–1918 (Active)
- Rank: Major (Army National Guard)
- Units: Missouri National Guard Air Unit 35th Division, Aviation Section.

Major William Bryan Robertson (October 8, 1893 – August 1, 1943) was an American aviator and aviation executive who was the co-founder of Lambert-St. Louis Flying Field as well as the owner and President of Robertson Aircraft Corporation (RAC) located there, a company which he had co-founded with his brother, Frank, in 1918.

RAC provided a wide range of aviation services as well as having operated Contract Air Mail service from St. Louis to Chicago (CAM-2) beginning in 1926. Along with the St. Louis Chamber of Commerce, in 1927 Robertson backed his chief Air Mail pilot, Charles Lindbergh, to compete in the Orteig Prize and funded the design and construction of his aircraft, the Spirit of St. Louis, for the New York-Paris flight.

== Biography ==
Robertson was born on October 8, 1893, in Nashville, Tennessee.

In 1924, Major Robertson became the first commanding officer of the Missouri National Guard Air Unit 35th Division, Aviation Section operating out of Lambert field with eight Curtiss JN-4 "Jenny" aircraft. The unit which Robertson commanded is the ancestor of the Missouri Air National Guard's 110th Bomb Squadron, which is part of the 131st Bomb Wing.

In 1927, Robertson left Robertson Aircraft Corporation and formed an interest with the Curtiss-Wright corporation. This created a division named Curtiss-Robertson Airplane Manufacturing Company to build the Curtiss-Robertson Robin aircraft. Robertson left the company in 1933 when it merged into Curtiss-Wright.

In November 1929, the small town of Anglum, Missouri, located adjacent to Lambert Field, was renamed Robertson in honor of his contributions to aviation.

On August 1, 1943, a WACO CG-4A military troop and cargo transport glider built under license by RAC crashed at Lambert Field in St. Louis during a demonstration flight. The glider's right wing separated shortly after it had been released at 3,000 feet (910 m) by its Army C-47 tow plane. The crash killed all ten on board, including Maj. Robertson. Robertson's then 17-year-old son, James, was a passenger in a successful flight of the glider made immediately before the fatal flight.
