= Universal Aviation Corporation =

- Founded: 1929; 96 years ago
- Ceased operations: 1929; 96 years ago
- Subsidiaries: Universal Air Lines Corporation
- Parent company: Avco
- Headquarters: St. Louis

Universal Aviation Corporation was an airline holding company based in United States.

== History ==
Universal Aviation Corporation was stood up to merge operations of Universal Air Lines Corporation, Robertson Aircraft Corporation and Northern Air Lines Universal owned 10 percent of Fokker Aircraft and participated in a stock swap with Western Air Express. In 1929, Universal Aviation purchased Braniff Air Lines. In 1929, Universal Aviation Corporation became part of the Aviation Corporation. American Airlines was formed from the merger of Universal and 90 other companies.

== Destinations ==
United States

- Cleveland (Airport)
- Kansas City
- St. Louis
- Tulsa

== Fleet ==
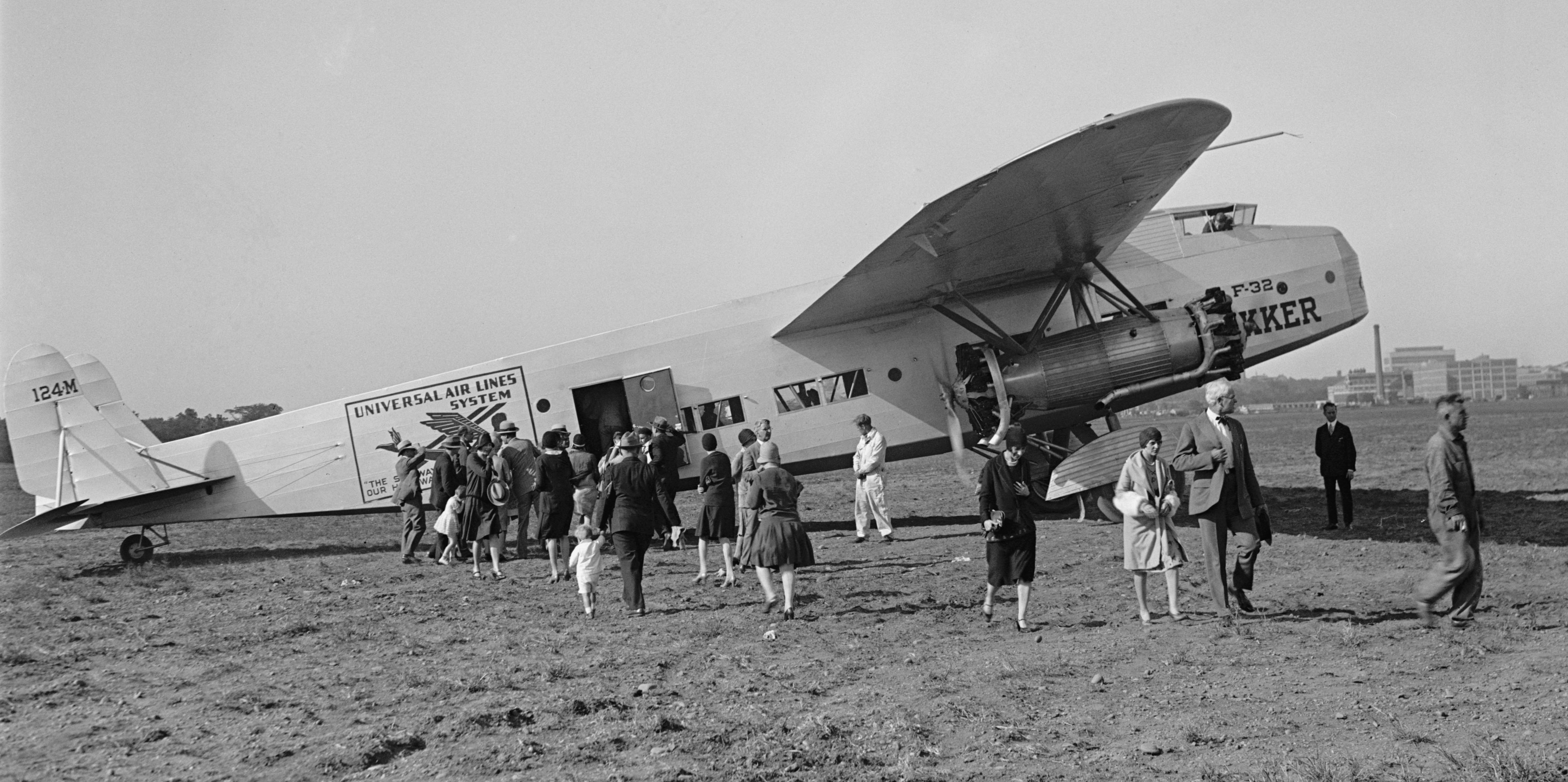
A F.32 in Universal Airlines Livery (1929)

In 1929 UAC operated the following aircraft.

- Fairchild 71
- Fokker F.10A
- Fokker F.32
- Fokker Super Universal

== See also ==
- List of defunct airlines of the United States
