= Universal Air Lines Corporation =

American regional airline

- Founded: July 30, 1928; 97 years ago
- Ceased operations: 1934; 92 years ago
- Parent company: Universal Aviation Corporation, Avco
- Headquarters: St. Louis

Universal Air Lines was an airline based in the United States.

== History ==
Universal Air Lines was an air-rail conglomerate competing with rival Transcontinental Air Transport. Universal Air Lines was a subsidiary of the Universal Aviation Corporation which included Robertson Aircraft Corporation and Northern Air Lines In 1929, Universal Air Lines purchased Braniff Air Lines. In 1929, The Parent company, Universal Aviation Corporation became part of the Aviation Corporation. American Airlines was formed from the merger of Universal and 90 other companies.

Universal Air Lines promoted the new era of air travel with its "Sky Dinner" Fokker Trimotors, with the conveniences of a Pullman train, which amounted to an electric stove prep area, folding tables, and a lavatory. On some Cleveland to Kansas City routes, as many as three Fokker aircraft would fly in formation to the destination.

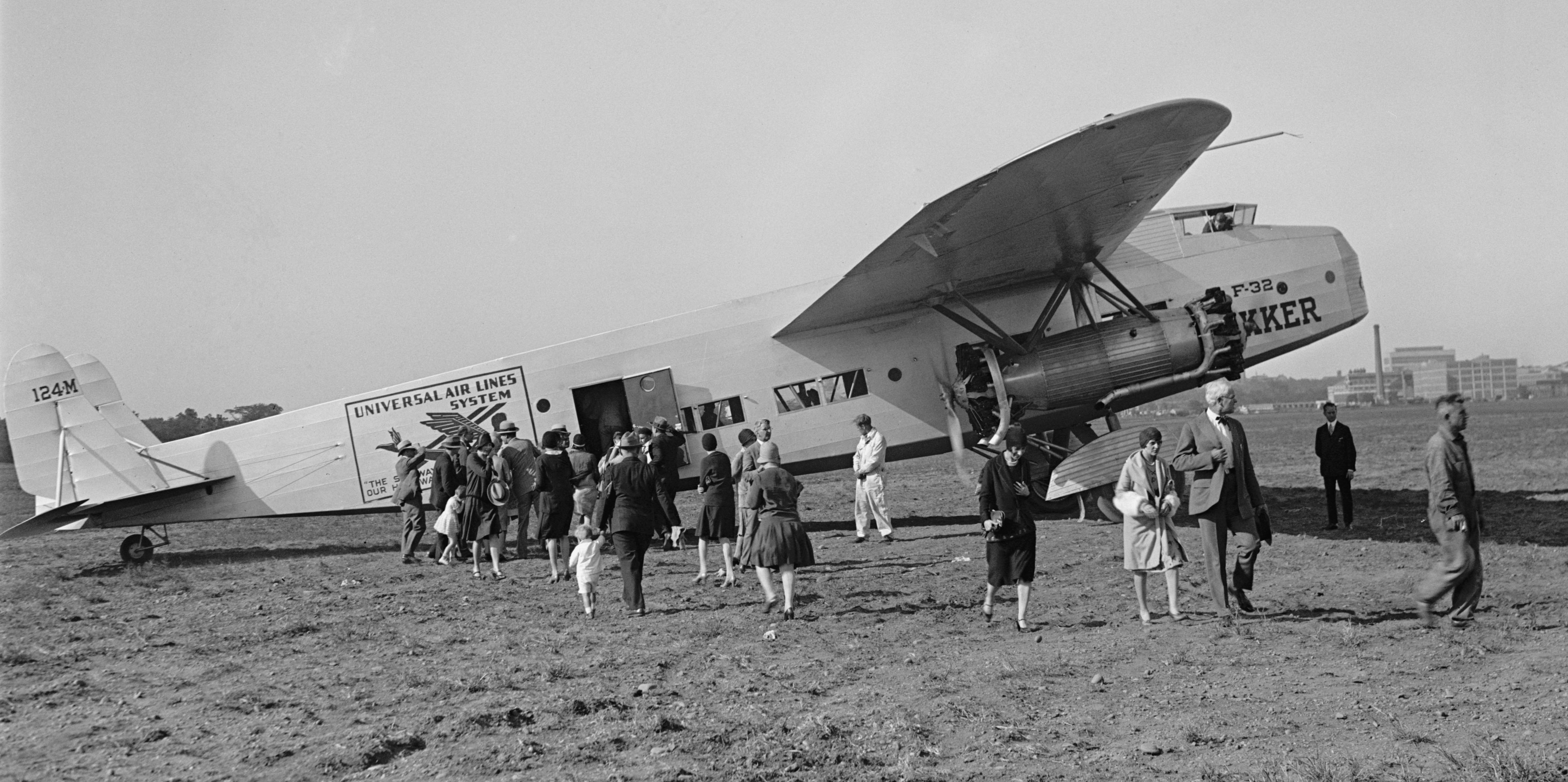
A Fokker F.32 in U.A.L. colors, 25 September 1929

Universal Air Lines ordered five Fokker F.32 aircraft. One was painted in the airlines livery, but all orders were canceled as the Great Depression set in.

== Destinations ==
- Cleveland, Ohio
- Kansas City, Missouri
- St.Louis, Missouri
- Tulsa, Oklahoma

== Fleet ==
The Universal Air Lines fleet consisted of the following aircraft as of 1929:

Universal Air Lines Fleet
Aircraft	Total	Routes	Notes
Fokker F.10
Fokker Super Universal
Travel Air 5 place

== Incidents and accidents ==
Universal Air Lines shared hangar space with NorthWest Airlines at Chicago's Municipal airport. On June 25, 1930, the Universal Air Lines hangar caught fire destroying 27 aircraft, leaving only five. The fire spread to the neighboring Grey Goose Air Lines hangar.

== See also ==
- List of defunct airlines of the United States
