= St. Louis Lambert International Airport =

Main airport serving St. Louis, Missouri, United States

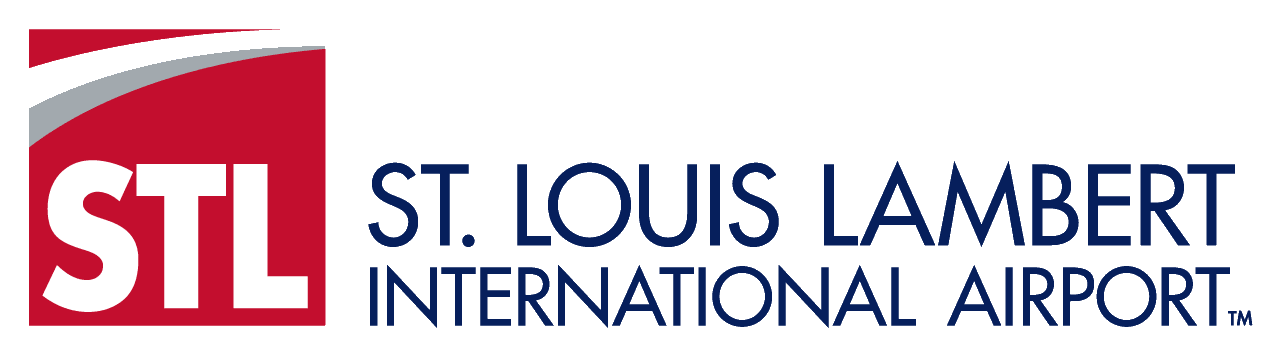

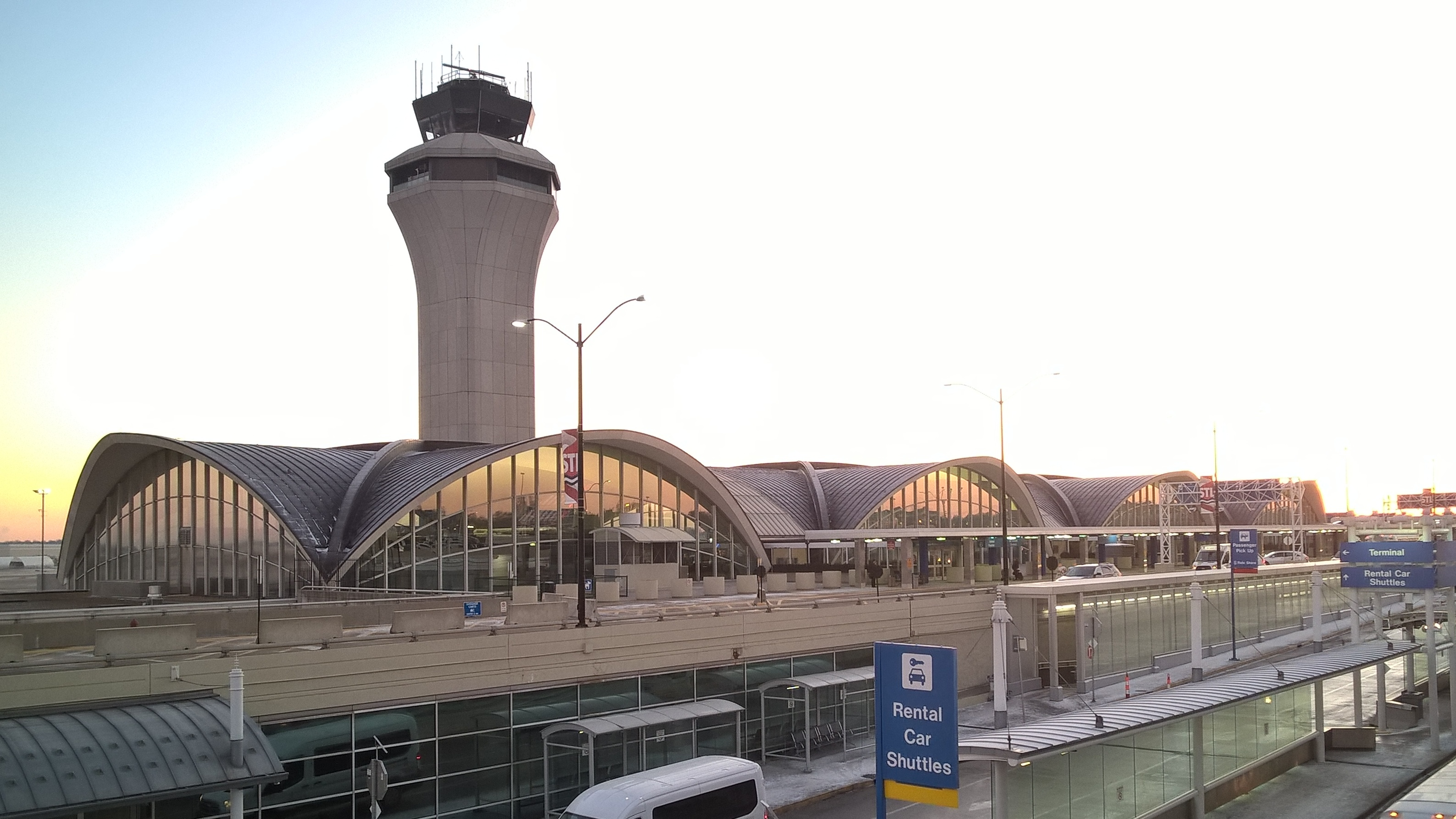
- IATA: STL; ICAO: KSTL; FAA LID: STL; WMO: 72434

Summary
- Airport type: Public
- Owner/Operator: City of St. Louis Government
- Serves: Greater St. Louis; Southern Illinois
- Location: St. Louis, Missouri, U.S.
- Opened: February 27, 1928; 98 years ago
- Hub for: Southern Airways Express
- Elevation AMSL: 605 ft (184 m)
- Coordinates: 38°44′50″N 090°21′41″W
- Public transit access: Red
- Website: flystl.com

Maps
- FAA airport diagram
- Interactive map of St. Louis Lambert International Airport

Runways
Direction	Length		Surface
Direction	ft	m	Surface
12R/30L	11,020	3,359	Concrete
12L/30R	9,013	2,747	Concrete
11/29	9,000	2,743	Concrete
6/24	7,603	2,317	Concrete

Statistics (2025)
- Aircraft operations: 161,300
- Total passengers: 15,303,756 ▼4.0%
- Source: St. Louis Lambert International Airport

St. Louis Lambert International Airport (IATA: STL, ICAO: KSTL, FAA LID: STL), commonly referred to as Lambert Field or simply Lambert, is the primary international airport serving St. Louis, Missouri, and its metropolitan area. Covering 3,793 acres (1,535 ha) of land, it is the largest and busiest airport in the U.S. state of Missouri, being located 14 miles (23 km) northwest of downtown St. Louis in unincorporated St. Louis County between Berkeley and Bridgeton. The airport provides nonstop service to over 60 destinations within the United States, Canada, Mexico, the Caribbean, and Europe, having served nearly 16 million passengers in 2024.

Named for Olympic medalist and prominent St. Louis aviator Albert Bond Lambert, the airport rose to international prominence in the 20th century thanks to its association with Charles Lindbergh, its groundbreaking air traffic control (ATC), its status as the primary hub of Trans World Airlines (TWA), and its iconic terminal.

St. Louis Lambert International Airport is connected by the MetroLink mass transportation rail system to other parts of the St. Louis metropolitan area, including a future connection to the region's secondary commercial airport, MidAmerica St. Louis Airport about 37 miles (60 km) to the east.

== History ==
=== Beginnings ===
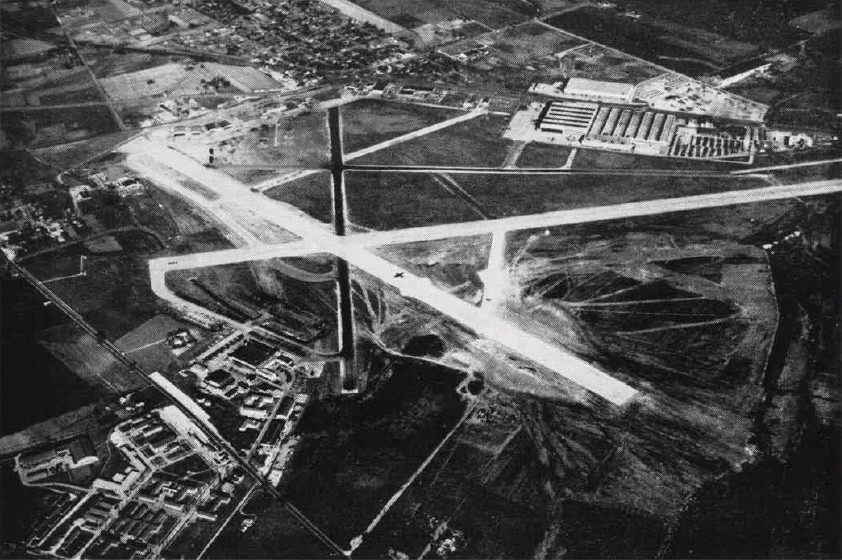
Aerial view of Naval Air Station St. Louis in the mid-1940s

The airport had its beginnings in 1909, when the Aero Club of St. Louis created a balloon launching base called the "Permanent Aviation Field and Dirigible Harbor" in Kinloch Park, a suburban development of the 1890s. In October 1910, the airfield hosted the first International Air Meet, attracting "many famous persons," including the Wright brothers, who brought six airplanes and their Exhibition Team. President Theodore Roosevelt accepted the club's telegraphed invitation to attend, and after initially ruling out a flight, took off on October 11 with pilot Arch Hoxsey, becoming the first U.S. president to fly. The following year, the airfield—generally called "Kinloch Field"—was the takeoff point for what is generally regarded as the first parachute jump from an airplane. The club's lease on the land expired in 1912, and the field was closed and its grandstand demolished. Efforts to revive the facility were unsuccessful.

In June 1920, a nearby 170-acre field was leased to the Missouri Aeronautical Society, which named its facility the "St. Louis Flying Field." Among the Society's leading members was Albert Bond Lambert, an Olympic silver medalist golfer in the 1904 Summer Games, president of Lambert Pharmaceutical Corporation (which made Listerine), and the first person to receive a pilot's license in St. Louis. So vigorous was Lambert in his efforts to promote St. Louis aviation that in 1923 the field was renamed "Lambert-St. Louis Flying Field." Lambert purchased the field outright in February 1925, and added hangars and a passenger terminal. In the late 1920s, the airport became the first with an air traffic control system–albeit one that communicated with pilots via waving flags. The first controller was Archie League.

Charles Lindbergh's first piloting job was flying airmail for Robertson Aircraft Corporation from the airfield. He stopped at the airport during his cross-country San Diego to New York flight about a week before his record-breaking flight to Paris in 1927. In February 1928, the City of St. Louis leased the airport for $1 million. Later that year, Lambert sold the airport to the city after a $2 million bond issue was passed, making it one of the first municipally owned airports in the United States.

In 1925, the airport became home to Naval Air Station St. Louis, a Naval Air Reserve facility that became an active-duty installation during World War II.

In 1930, the airport was officially christened "Lambert–St. Louis Municipal Airport" by Rear Admiral Richard E. Byrd. The first terminal building opened in 1933, and within the decade, the airport was served by Robertson Air Lines, Marquette Airlines, Eastern Air Lines, and Transcontinental & Western Air (later renamed TWA).

In August 1942, voters passed a $4.5 million bond issue to expand the airport by 867 acres (351 ha) and build a new terminal.

During World War II, the airport became a manufacturing base for the McDonnell Aircraft Corporation (later McDonnell Douglas, now Boeing) and Curtiss-Wright.

=== After World War II: expansion, Ozark Air Lines hub ===
Terminal 1 as it originally appeared

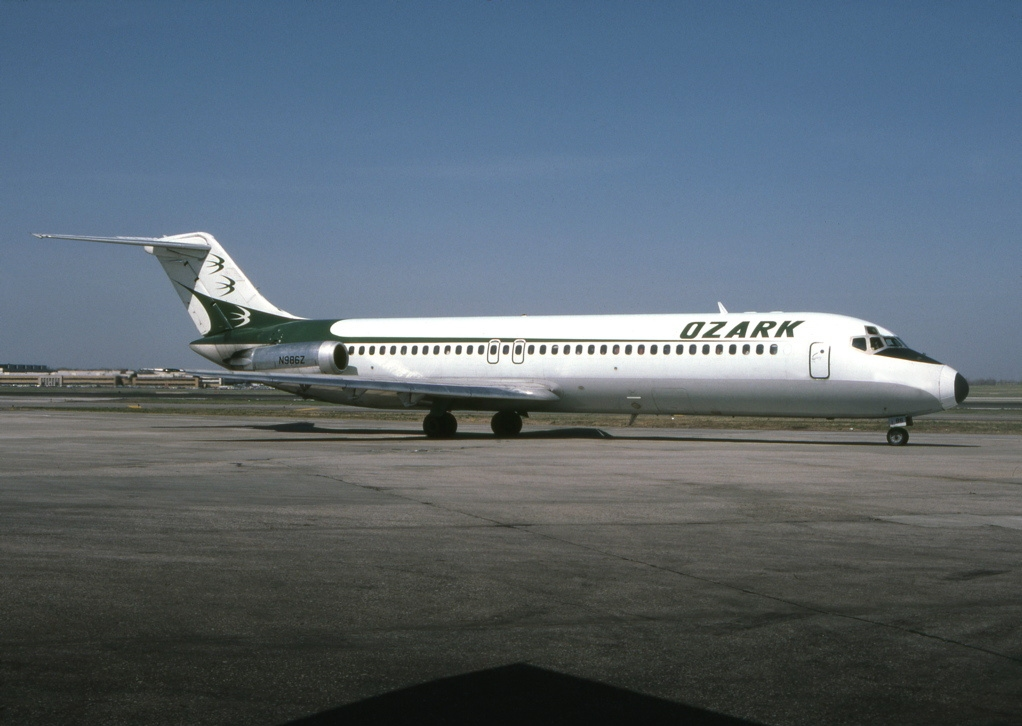
Ozark DC-9 at Lambert

After the war, NAS St. Louis reverted to a reserve installation, supporting carrier-based fighters and land-based patrol aircraft. When it closed in 1958, most of its facilities were acquired by the Missouri Air National Guard and became "Lambert Field Air National Guard Base." Some other facilities were retained by non-flying activities of the Naval Reserve and Marine Corps Reserve, while the rest was redeveloped to expand airline operations at the airport.

Ozark Air Lines began operations at the airport in 1950.

To handle increasing passenger traffic, Minoru Yamasaki was commissioned to design a new terminal, which began construction in 1953. Completed in 1956 at a total cost of $7.2 million, the three-domed design preceded TWA terminal at John F. Kennedy International Airport (JFK) in New York City. A fourth dome was added in 1965 following the passage of a $200 million airport revenue bond.

The April 1957 Official Airline Guide shows 44 weekday TWA departures; American, 24; Delta, 16; Ozark, 14; Eastern, 13; Braniff, 6 and Central, 2. The first scheduled jet was a TWA 707 to New York on July 21, 1959.

In 1971, the airport became "Lambert–St. Louis International Airport."

In the 1970s, St. Louis city officials proposed to replace Lambert with a new airport in suburban Illinois. After Missouri residents rejected that, Lambert in 1977 received a $290-million expansion that lengthened the runways, increased the number of gates to 81, and boosted its capacity by half. (In 1997, MidAmerica St. Louis Airport would open in Mascoutah, Illinois, far from the site proposed in the 1970s.) Concourse A and Concourse C were rebuilt into bi-level structures with jet bridges as part of a $25 million project in the mid-1970s designed by Sverdrup. The other concourses were demolished. Construction began in the spring of 1976 and was completed in September 1977. A $20 million, 120,000-square-foot (11,000 m^{2}) extension of Concourse C for TWA and a $46 million, 210,000-square-foot (20,000 m^{2}) Concourse D for Ozark Air Lines (also designed by Sverdrup) were completed in December 1982.

Ozark established its only hub at Lambert in the late 1950s. The airline grew rapidly, going from 36 million revenue passenger miles in 1955, to 229 million revenue passenger miles in 1965. The jet age came to Ozark in 1966 with the Douglas DC-9-10 and its network expanded to Denver, Indianapolis, Louisville, Washington, D.C., New York City, Miami, Tampa, and Orlando. With the addition of jets, Ozark began its fastest period of growth, jumping to 653 million revenue passenger miles in 1970 and 936 million revenue passenger miles in 1975; Ozark soon faced heavy competition in TWA's new hub at Lambert.

In 1979, the year after airline deregulation, STL's dominant carriers were TWA (36 routes) and Ozark (25), followed by American (17) and Eastern (12). In April 1980, British Caledonian began a nonstop flight to London's Gatwick Airport using a Boeing 707. This was the airport's first transatlantic service. The company later partnered with Ozark so that the latter's network could feed the flights. British Caledonian severed the link in October 1984.

=== Trans World Airlines hub ===
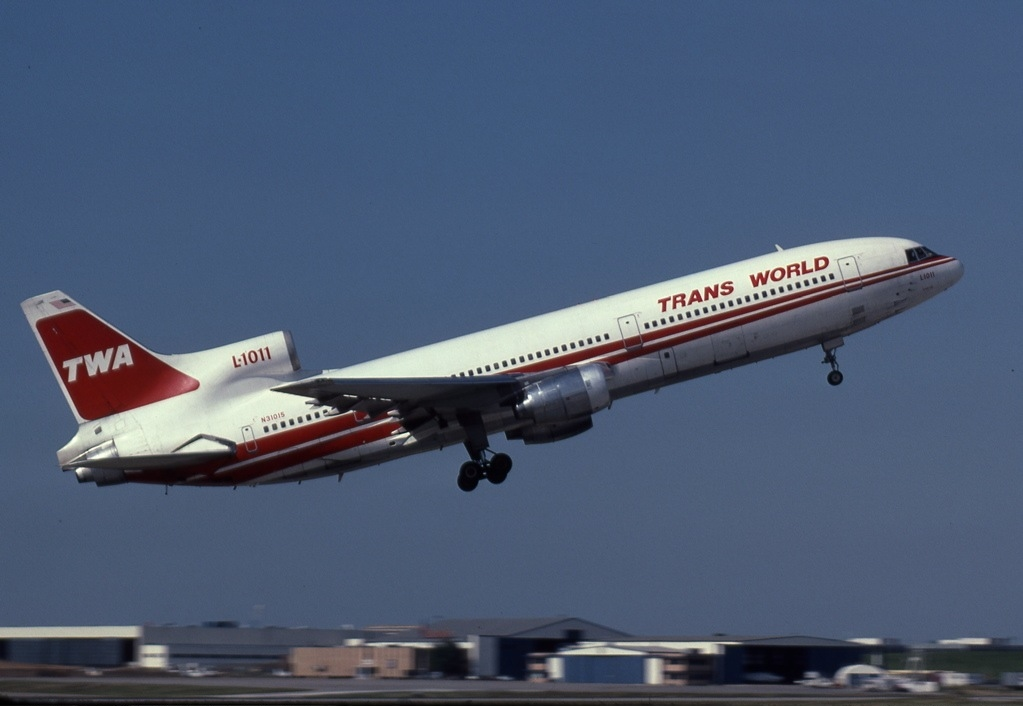
TWA L-1011 at Lambert in 1985

After airline deregulation in 1978, airlines began to change their operations to a hub and spoke model. Trans World Airlines (TWA) was headquartered in New York City but its main base of employment was at Kansas City International Airport (MCI) and had large operations at Chicago O'Hare International Airport (ORD) as well as St. Louis. TWA deemed Kansas City's terminals unsuitable to serve as a primary hub. TWA reluctantly ruled out Chicago, as its Chicago operation was already losing $25 million a year under competition from American Airlines and United Airlines. This meant that St. Louis was the carrier's only viable option. TWA downsized in Chicago and built up in St. Louis, swapping three Chicago gates for five of American's St. Louis gates. By December 1982, St. Louis accounted for 20% of TWA's domestic capacity. Lambert's terminal was initially too small for this operation, and TWA was forced to use temporary terminals, mobile lounges and airstairs to handle the additional flights. Concourse D was completed in 1985. In April 1985, TWA began service from Lambert to London-Gatwick, Frankfurt, and Paris. It operated the flight to London with Boeing 747s and the ones to Paris and Frankfurt with 767s.

TWA's hub grew again in 1986 when the airline bought Ozark Air Lines, which operated its hub from Lambert's B, C, and D concourses. In 1985, TWA had accounted for 56.6% of boardings at STL while Ozark accounted for 26.3%, so the merged carriers controlled over 80% of the traffic. The carriers were merged on October 26, 1986, at which time TWA served STL with nonstop service to 84 cities, an increase from 80 cities served by TWA and/or Ozark in 1985, before the merger.

Lambert again grew in importance for TWA after the airline declared bankruptcy in 1992 and the following year moved its headquarters to St. Louis from Mount Kisco, New York. TWA increased the number of cities served and started routing more connecting passengers through its hub at Lambert. The total number of passengers departing Lambert jumped almost 20% in a year, from 19.9 million passengers in 1993 to 23.4 million in 1994. Growth continued, to 27.3 million by 1997 and the airport's all-time peak of 30.6 million in 2000.

By September 1999, Lambert was TWA's main hub, with 103 destinations served by 515 daily flights: 352 on TWA mainline aircraft and 163 on Trans World Express flights operated by its commuter airline partners. Lambert became the eighth-busiest U.S. airport by flights. Congestion caused delays during peak hours and was exacerbated when bad weather reduced the number of usable runways from three to one, and traffic projections made in the 1980s and 1990s predicted enough growth to strain the airport and the national air traffic system. As a result, city leaders decided to build a 9,000-foot (2,700 m) runway, dubbed Runway 11/29, parallel to the two larger existing runways. At $1.1 billion, it was the costliest public works program in St. Louis history. It required moving seven major roads and destroying about 2,000 homes, six churches, and four schools in Bridgeton. Work began in 1998 and continued even as traffic at the airport declined after the 9/11 attacks, the collapse of TWA and its subsequent purchase by American, and American's flight reductions several years later.

=== American Airlines and hub closure ===
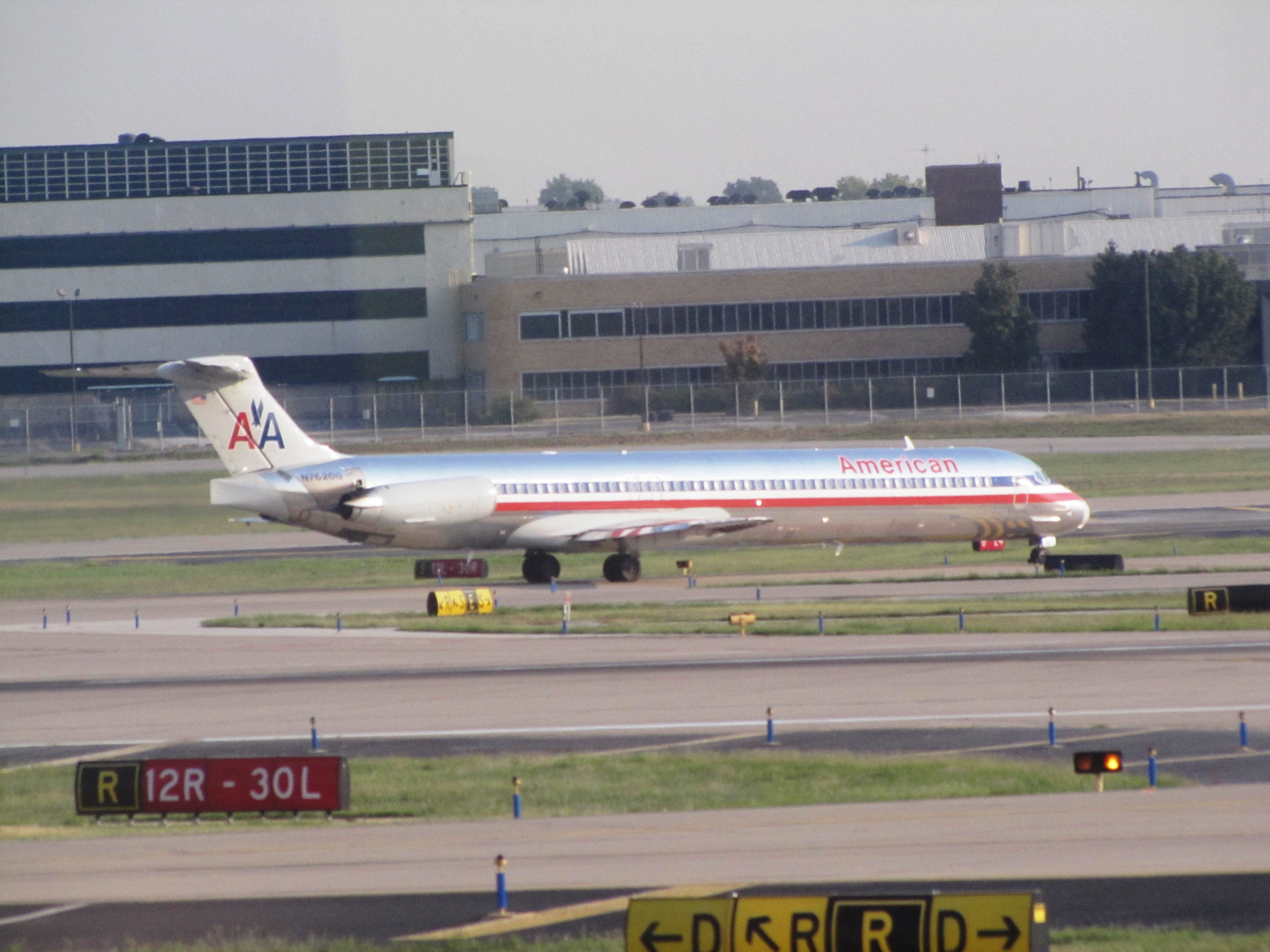
American MD-83 at Lambert in August 2011

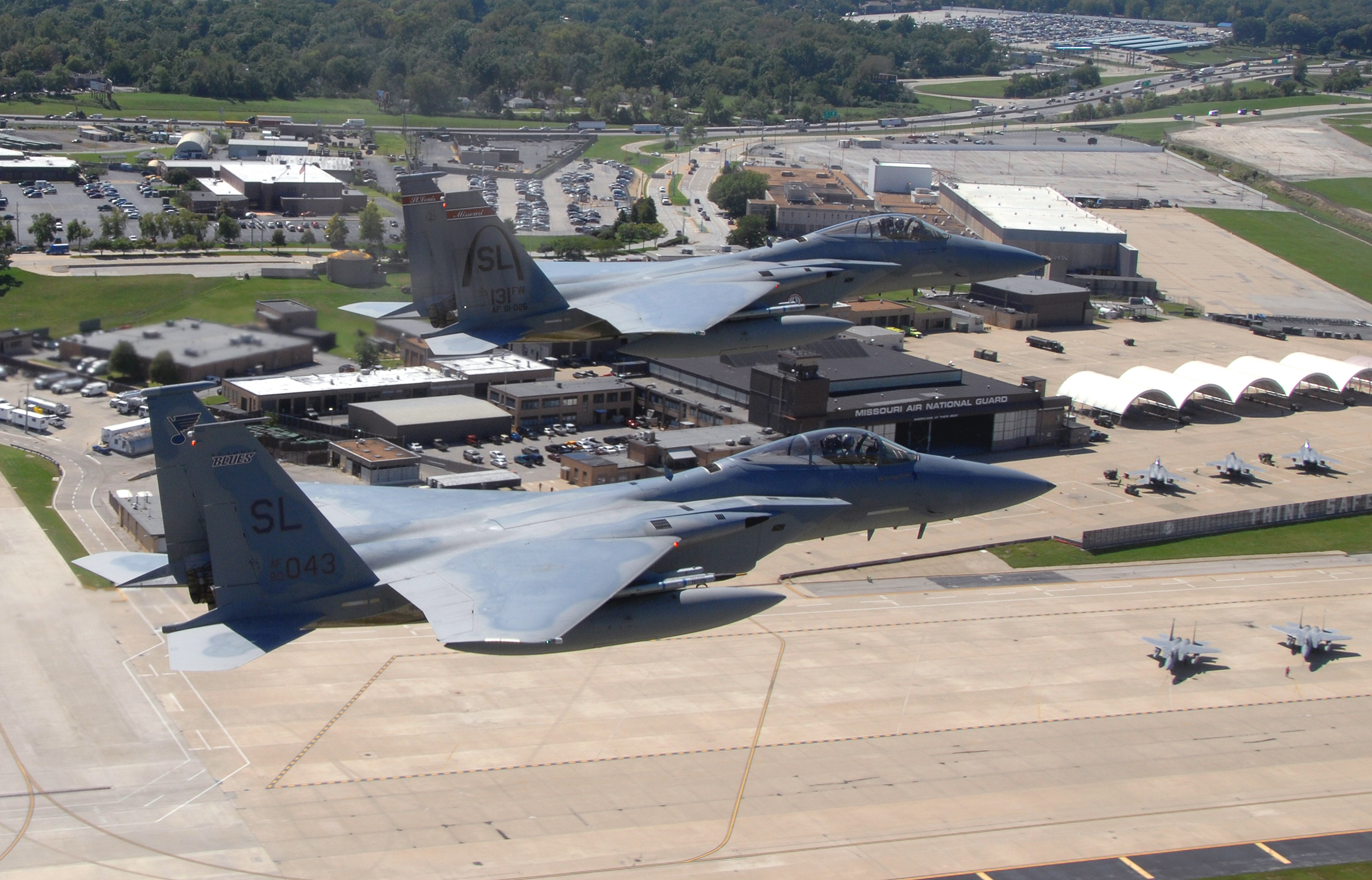
F-15s flying over the Air National Guard base

As TWA entered the new millennium, its financial condition deteriorated; it was purchased by American Airlines in April 2001. The last day of operations for TWA was December 1, 2001, including a ceremonial last flight to TWA's original and historic hometown of Kansas City before returning to St. Louis one final time. The following day, TWA was officially absorbed into American Airlines. The plan for Lambert was to become a reliever hub for the existing American hubs at Chicago–O'Hare and Dallas/Fort Worth (DFW). American was looking at something strategic with its new St. Louis hub to potentially offload some of the pressure on O'Hare as well as provide a significant boost to the airline's east/west connectivity.

The September 11 attacks depressed air service nationwide: total airline industry domestic revenue passenger miles dropped 20% in October 2001 and 17% in November 2001. Overnight, American no longer had the same need for a hub that bypassed its hubs at Chicago and Dallas/Fort Worth, which suddenly became less congested. As a result of this and the ongoing economic recession, service at Lambert was reduced to 207 flights by November 2003. Total passenger traffic dropped to 20.4 million that same year. On the international front, American dropped flights to London-Gatwick in October 2003, leaving St. Louis without transatlantic service.

In 2006, the United States Air Force (USAF) announced plans to turn the 131st Fighter Wing of the Missouri Air National Guard into the 131st Bomb Wing. The wing's 20 F-15C and F-15D aircraft were moved to the Montana Air National Guard's 120th Airlift Wing at Great Falls International Airport/Air National Guard Base, Montana, and the Hawaii Air National Guard's 154th Wing at Hickam AFB, Hawaii. The pilots and maintainers moved to Whiteman AFB, Missouri to fly and maintain the B-2 Spirit stealth bomber as the first Air National Guard wing to fly the aircraft. Lambert Field Air National Guard Base formally shut down on June 13, 2009, when the final two F-15C Eagles did a low approach over the field and then flew away, ending an 86-year chapter of Lambert's history.

2006 also saw the completion of the W-1W airport expansion after eight years of work. The culmination of this program was the opening of Runway 11/29, the airport's fourth, on April 13, 2006, when American Airlines Flight 2470 became the first commercial airliner to land on the new runway.

In 2008, Lambert's position as an American Airlines hub faced further pressure due to increased fuel costs and softened demand because of a depressed economy. American cut its overall system capacity by over 5% during 2008. At Lambert, American shifted more flights from mainline to regional. Total passengers enplaned fell 6% to 14.4 million in 2008, then fell another 11% to 12.8 million passengers in 2009. In 2009, American announced that as a part of the airline's restructuring, it would close its St. Louis hub by reducing its operations from about 200 daily flights to 36 daily flights by summer 2010. American's closure of the St. Louis hub coincided with its new "Cornerstone" plan, wherein the airline would concentrate itself in several major markets: Chicago, Dallas/Fort Worth, Miami, New York, and Los Angeles. A 12-gate section of Concourse D closed in 2009 as a result of the hub closure. Further flight reductions led to the closure of Concourse B and the rest of Concourse D in 2010 (though some gates at the east end of Concourse D are now part of Concourse E).

=== Recent years ===
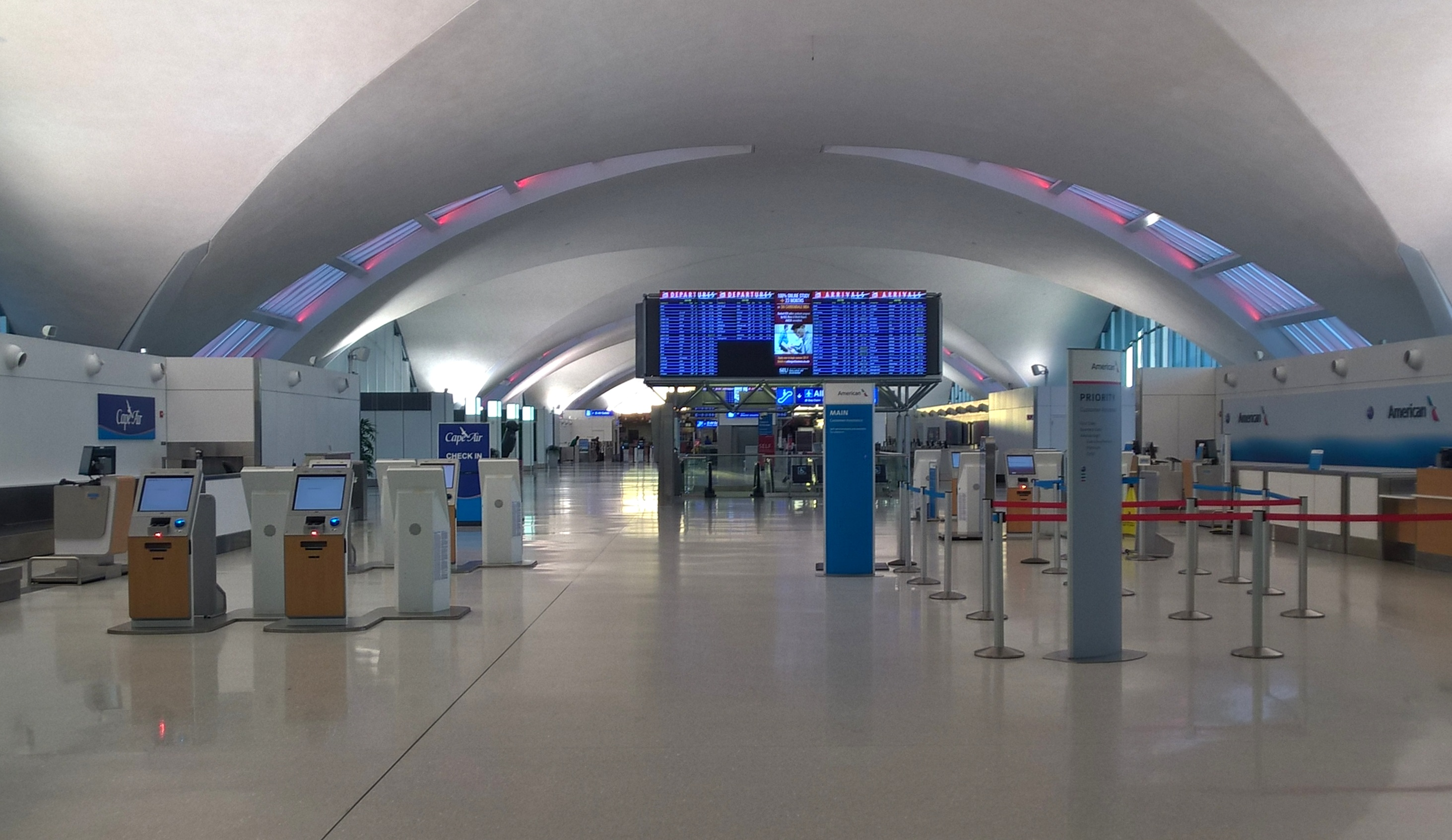
Terminal 1 departures hall in 2017 after renovation

In the aftermath of the American hub closure, Southwest Airlines boosted daily departures from 74 to 83, adding six new destinations for a total of 31. Southwest quickly replaced American as the carrier with the most daily flights, and continues to dominate the airport to this day. Southwest Airlines had been growing steadily at Lambert since the mid-1990s. In 1998, the East Terminal (known today as Terminal 2) and Concourse E opened to accommodate Southwest's growth, where they operate today.

In late 2016, officials with the City of St. Louis announced that brand researchers had found that travelers might be confused by the name "Lambert–St. Louis International Airport". They said they might rename it St. Louis International Airport at Lambert Field to freshen up the airport's image and emphasize "St. Louis" in the name. Descendants of Albert Bond Lambert opposed the change, arguing that it de-emphasized the importance of Maj. Lambert to the airport's history and the history of aviation. The proposal was amended, and the St. Louis Airport Commission voted unanimously to change the name to St. Louis Lambert International Airport.

In May 2018, Wow Air began flights between St. Louis and Reykjavík on an Airbus A321. This was the airport's first service to Europe since 2003. Despite strong sales, Wow ended the route in January 2019 amid financial struggles. Service to Iceland is scheduled to be re-established in 2027, with Icelandair providing nonstop service to Reykjavík using 737 MAX 8's.

In June 2022, Lufthansa commenced nonstop service to Frankfurt using Airbus A330s. German firms like Bayer and the Merck Group have a significant presence in St. Louis. A second transatlantic flight was added in 2026, with British Airways flying direct to London-Heathrow. Lambert previously had service to Britain until 2003; however, this will be the airport's first flights to Heathrow as previous service was to Gatwick.

In early 2022, airport officials released a plan that would consolidate both existing terminals into one, at the existing Terminal 1 site. The proposal would gradually demolish Concourses A, B, C and build a single new concourse with 62 gates in its place, while retaining the iconic domed terminal building. Following the completion, Terminal 2 would be demolished or repurposed.

=== 2011 tornado ===
CCTV footage inside Concourse C recording the tornado's impact

On Good Friday, April 22, 2011, a tornado struck the airport's Terminal 1 building, destroying jetways and breaking more than half of the windows. The wind damaged a Southwest Airlines aircraft by pushing a baggage conveyor belt into it. Four American Airlines aircraft were damaged, including one that was buffeted by 80 mph (130 km/h; 70 kn) crosswinds while taxiing after landing. Another aircraft, with passengers still on board, was moved away from its jetway by the storm. The FAA closed the airport at 8:54 pm CDT, and reopened it the following day at temporarily lower capacity. The damage to Concourse C even forced the airport to temporarily reopen some of Concourses B and D for additional gate space. Concourse C underwent renovations and repairs and reopened on April 2, 2012.

== Facilities ==
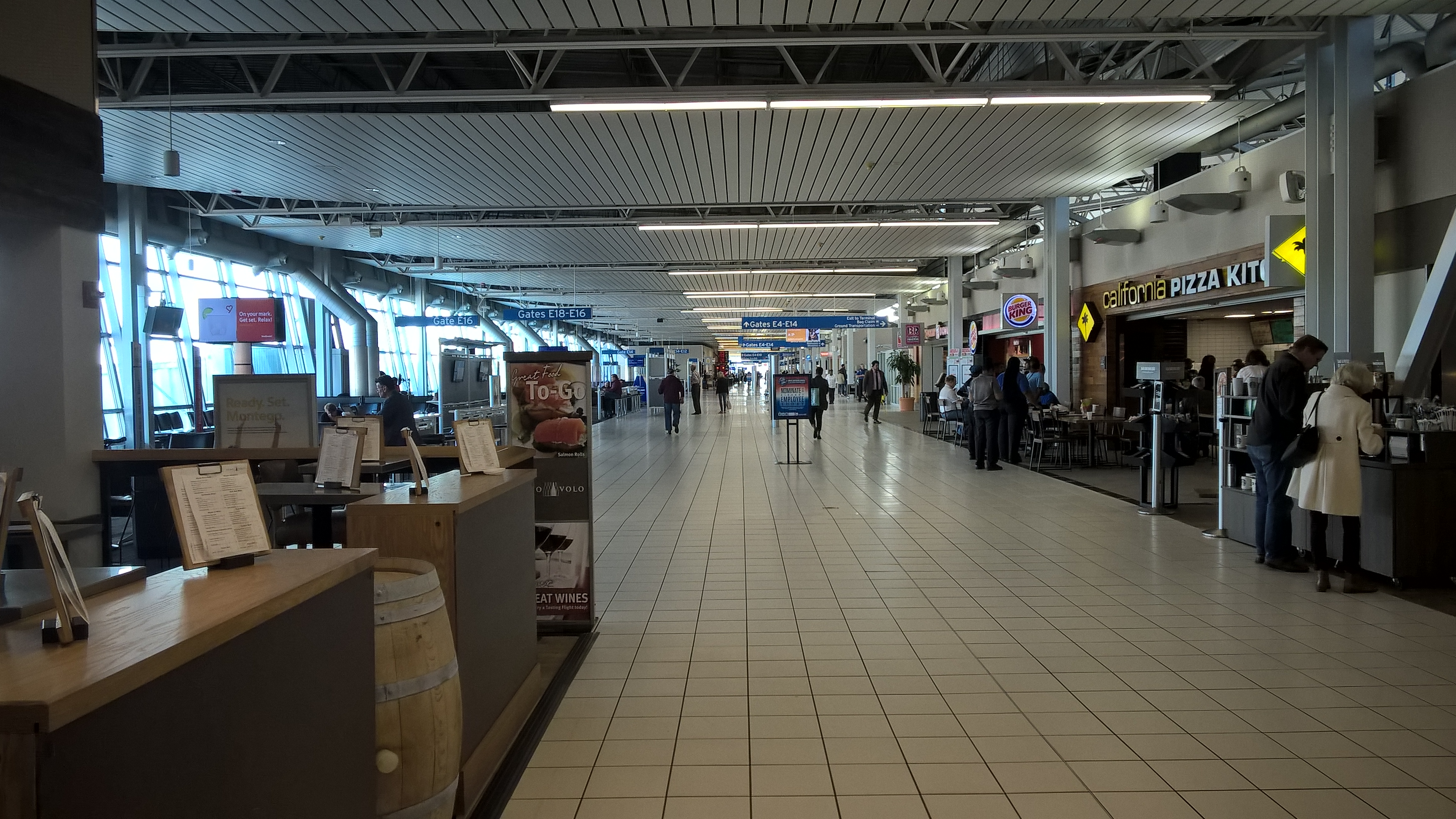
Interior of Concourse E

The airport is in an unincorporated area in Airport Township, St. Louis County.

=== Terminals ===
The airport has two terminals, five concourses, and 54 gates.

- Terminal 1 contains 36 gates across two concourses, lettered A and C. It also has an American Airlines Admirals Club and one of the nation's largest USO facilities.
- Terminal 2 contains 18 gates across one concourse, lettered E. It also has a public lounge operated by Wingtips. All international flights without border preclearance are processed in Terminal 2.

Inter-terminal transfers/connections can be made by Terminal Shuttle Buses or on the Metro rail between Terminal 1 and Terminal 2 (rail connection is free between the terminals as of July 2024)

=== Runways ===
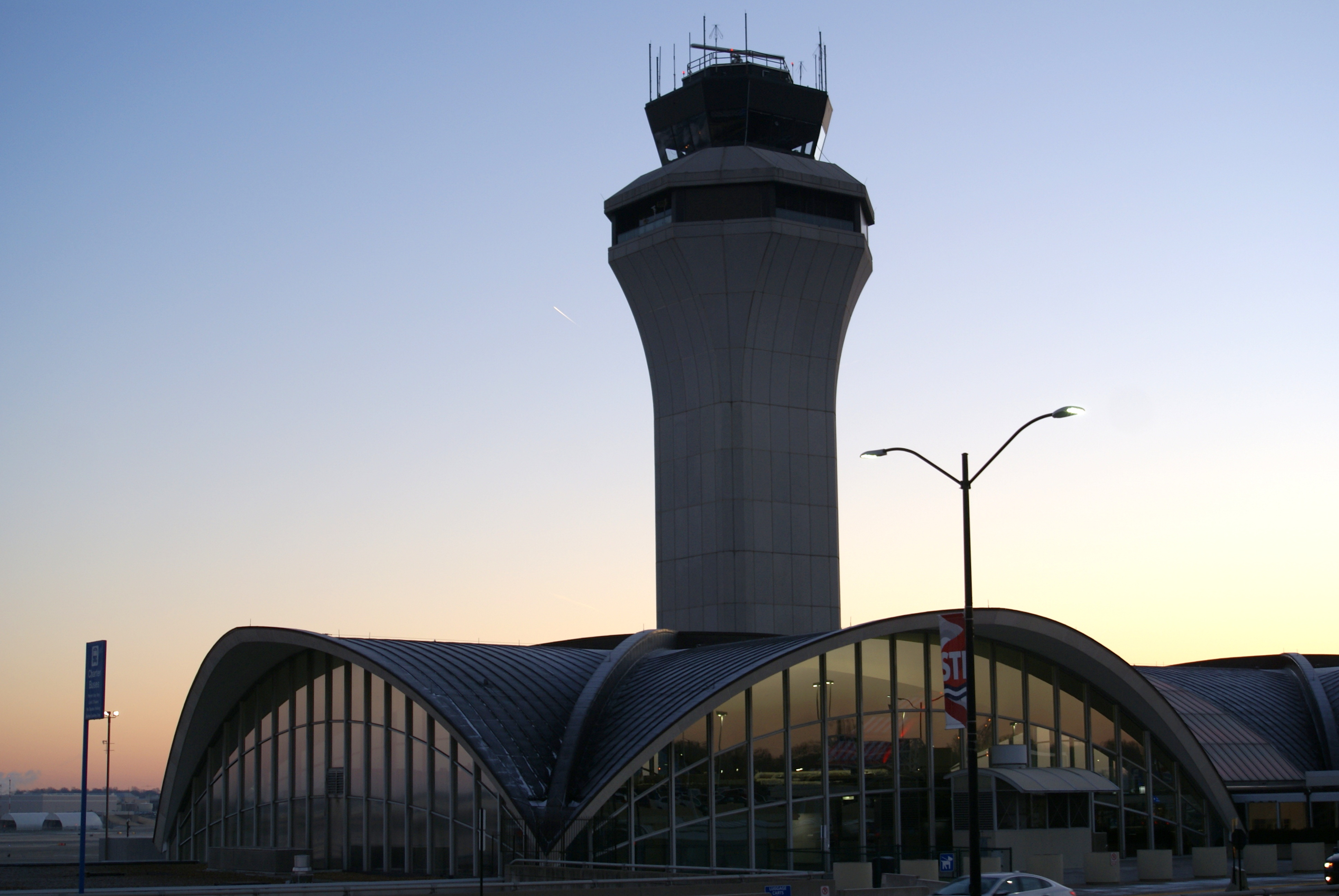
STL control tower

The airport has four runways: three parallel and one crosswind. The crosswind runway, 6/24, is the shortest of the four at 7,607 feet (2,319 m). The newest runway is 11/29, completed in 2006 as part of a large expansion program.

Runway	Length	Width
12R/30L	11,020 feet (3,360 m)	150 feet (46 m)
12L/30R	9,013 feet (2,747 m)	150 feet (46 m)
11/29	9,000 feet (2,700 m)	150 feet (46 m)
6/24	7,603 feet (2,317 m)	150 feet (46 m)

The airport's current ~156-foot (48-meter) control tower opened in 1997 at a cost of about $15 million.

=== Ground transportation ===
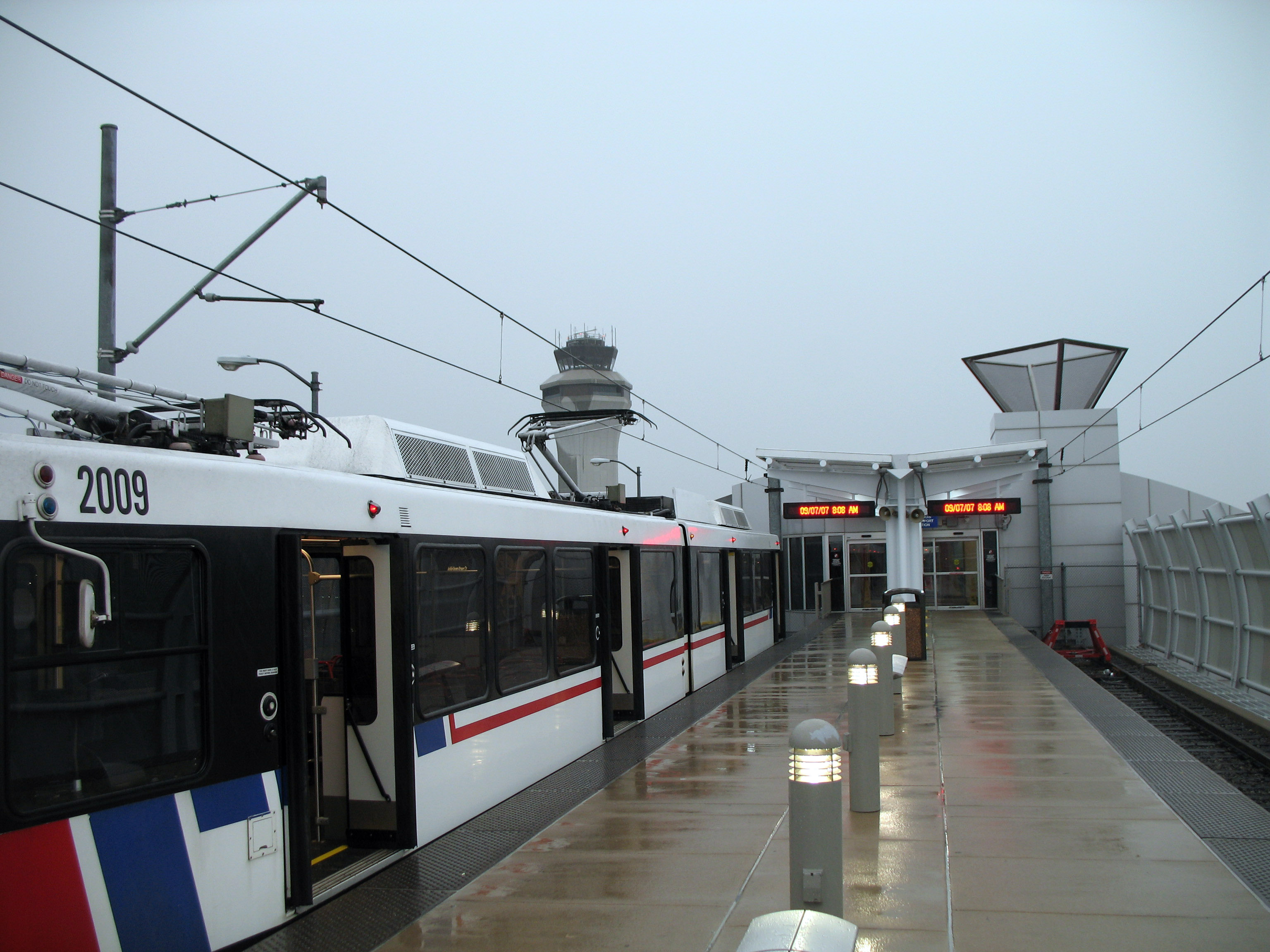
MetroLink station at Terminal 1

The airport is served by MetroLink, the light rail transportation system serving Greater St. Louis. The Red Line has stations at Terminal 1 and Terminal 2. The Metro lines serve the city of St. Louis, along with cities in St. Louis County, and Illinois suburbs in St. Clair County.

The airport is served by I-70; eastbound leads to downtown St. Louis and Illinois with a north–south connection at I-170 immediately east of the airport, while westbound leads to St. Louis exurbs in St. Charles County with a north–south connection at I-270 immediately west of the airport.

=== Art and historical pieces ===
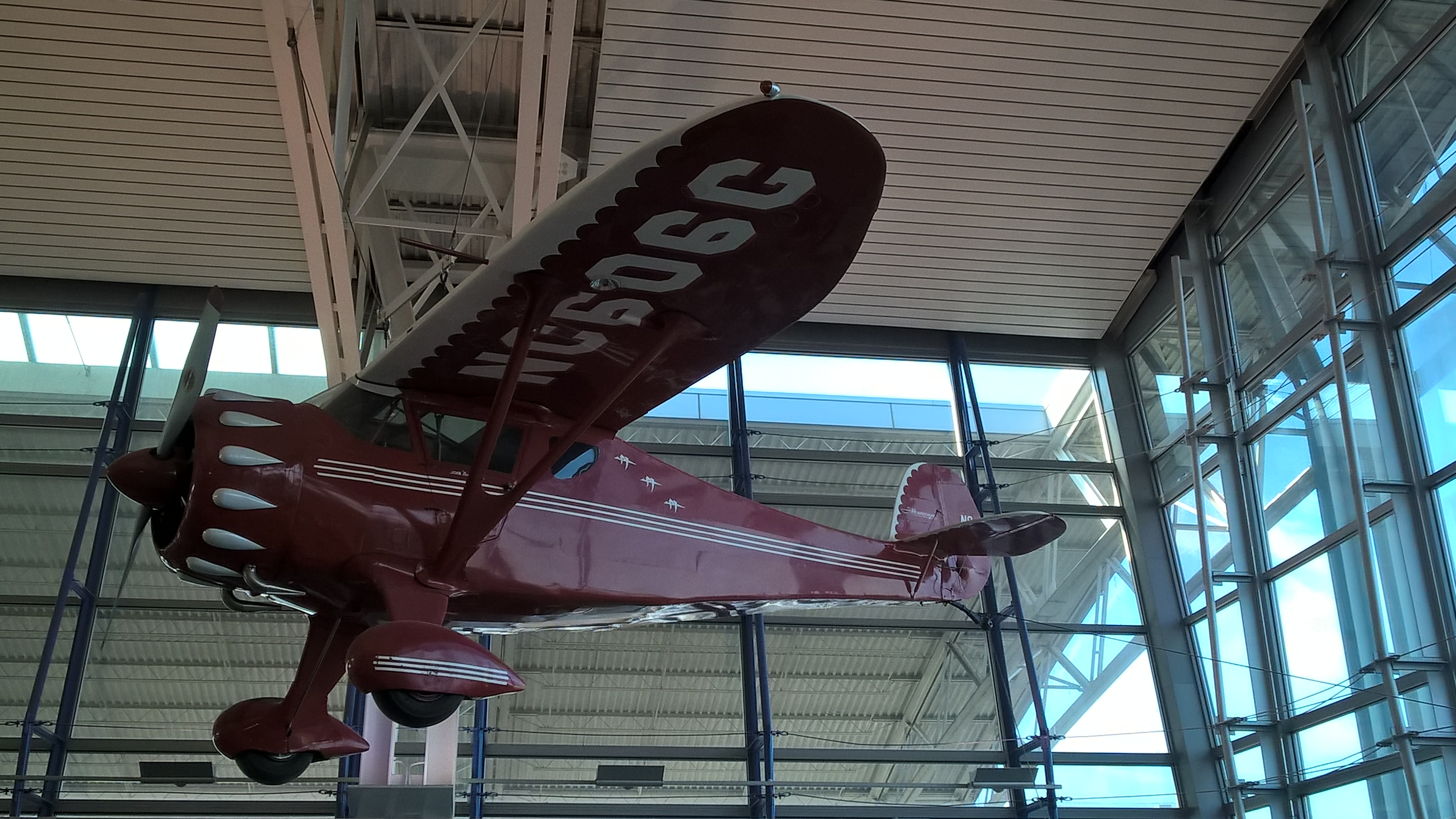
The Monocoupe 110 Special in Terminal 2

Black Americans in Flight is a mural that depicts African American aviators and their contributions to aviation since 1917. It is located in Terminal 1 / Main Terminal on the lower level near the entrance to gates C and D and baggage claim. The mural consists of five panels and measures 8 feet (2.4 m) tall and 51 feet (16 m) long. The first panel includes Albert Edward Forsythe and C. Alfred Anderson, the first black pilots to complete a cross-country flight; the Tuskegee Institute and the Tuskegee Airmen; Eugene Bullard; Bessie Coleman; and Willa Brown, the first African American woman commercial pilot. The second panel shows Benjamin O. Davis Jr., Clarence "Lucky" Lester, and Joseph Ellesberry. The third panel shows Gen. Daniel "Chappie" James, Capt. Ronald Radliff, and Capt. Marcella Hayes. The fourth and fifth panels show Ronald McNair, who died in the Space Shuttle Challenger disaster in 1986, Guion Bluford, who in 1983 became the first African American in space, and Mae Jemison, the first African American woman in space. Spencer Taylor and Solomon Thurman created the mural in 1990. The mural had a re-dedication ceremony in 2012.

One aircraft from the Missouri History Museum currently hangs from Lambert's ceilings. This aircraft, a red Monocoupe 110 Special manufactured in St. Louis in 1931, hangs in the ticketing hall of Terminal 2. The airport has also played host to two other aircraft. A Monocoupe D-127 hung near the eastern security checkpoint in Terminal 1. Charles Lindbergh bought it in 1934 from the Lambert Aircraft Corporation and flew it as his personal aircraft. It was removed in 2018 and returned to the Missouri Historical Society, from which the aircraft had been on loan since 1979, for preservation purposes. Until 1998, a Ryan B-1 Brougham, a replica of the Spirit of St. Louis, hung next to the D-127.

== Airlines and destinations ==
=== Passenger ===
Airlines	Destinations
Air Canada	Seasonal: Montréal–Trudeau, Toronto–Pearson
Air Canada Express	Toronto–Pearson; Seasonal: Montréal–Trudeau
Alaska Airlines	Seattle/Tacoma
American Airlines	Charlotte, Chicago–O'Hare, Dallas/Fort Worth, Miami, Philadelphia, Phoenix–Sky Harbor; Seasonal: Cancún, Washington–National
American Eagle	Boston, Chicago–O'Hare, Dallas/Fort Worth, Los Angeles, New York–LaGuardia, Philadelphia, Washington–National; Seasonal: Miami, Phoenix–Sky Harbor
British Airways	Seasonal: London–Heathrow
Delta Air Lines	Atlanta, Detroit, Minneapolis/St. Paul, Salt Lake City
Delta Connection	Minneapolis/St. Paul, New York–LaGuardia; Seasonal: Detroit
Frontier Airlines	Atlanta, Cancún, Denver, Las Vegas, Orlando, Tampa; Seasonal: Fort Lauderdale, Phoenix–Sky Harbor, Punta Cana
Icelandair	Seasonal: Reykjavík–Keflavík (begins May 14, 2027)
Lufthansa	Frankfurt
Southern Airways Express	Jonesboro
Southwest Airlines	Atlanta, Austin, Baltimore, Boston, Cancún, Chicago–Midway, Cleveland, Columbus–Glenn, Dallas–Love, Denver, Detroit, Fort Lauderdale, Fort Myers, Houston–Hobby, Jacksonville (FL), Kansas City, Las Vegas, Los Angeles, Miami, Milwaukee, Minneapolis/St. Paul, Nashville, New Orleans, New York–LaGuardia, Omaha, Orlando, Philadelphia, Phoenix–Sky Harbor, Pittsburgh, Raleigh/Durham, Sacramento, San Antonio, San Diego, San Francisco, Sarasota, Tampa, Washington–National; Seasonal: Burbank, Charleston (SC), Charlotte, Destin/Fort Walton Beach, Montego Bay, Myrtle Beach, Norfolk, Panama City (FL), Pensacola, Portland (OR), Punta Cana, Salt Lake City, San José del Cabo, San Juan, Savannah, Seattle/Tacoma, West Palm Beach (FL)
Sun Country Airlines	Seasonal: Minneapolis/St. Paul
United Airlines	Chicago–O'Hare, Denver, Houston-Intercontinental; Seasonal: Newark
United Express	Chicago–O'Hare, Denver, Houston-Intercontinental, Newark, Washington-Dulles

=== Destination maps ===
Domestic destinations map
Domestic destinations from STL (excludes Alaska, Hawaii, and U.S. territories). Red dots represent year-round destinations; green dots represent seasonal destinations; blue dots represent future destinations.

International destinations map
International destinations from STL (includes Alaska, Hawaii, and U.S. territories). Red dots represent year-round destinations; Green dots represent seasonal destinations; Blue dots represent future destinations.

== Statistics ==
=== Top destinations ===
Busiest domestic routes from STL (June 2025 – May 2026)
Rank	City	Passengers	Carriers
1	Denver, Colorado	470,023	Frontier, Southwest, United
2	Atlanta, Georgia	453,787	Delta, Frontier, Southwest
3	Orlando, Florida	323,902	Frontier, Southwest
4	Chicago–O'Hare, Illinois	308,513	American, United
5	Phoenix–Sky Harbor, Arizona	297,076	American, Southwest
6	New York–LaGuardia, New York	286,853	American, Delta, Southwest
7	Las Vegas, Nevada	270,858	Frontier, Southwest
8	Dallas/Fort Worth, Texas	263,298	American, Frontier
9	Charlotte, North Carolina	226,849	American, Southwest
10	Dallas–Love, Texas	214,683	Southwest

Busiest international routes from STL (June 2025 – May 2026)
Rank	City	Passengers	Carriers
1	Cancún, Mexico	245,447	Frontier, Southwest
2	Frankfurt, Germany	65,637	Lufthansa
3	Punta Cana, Dominican Republic	52,097	Frontier, Southwest
4	Toronto–Pearson, Canada	50,463	Air Canada
5	Montréal, Canada	17,053	Air Canada
6	London, United Kingdom	8,467	British Airways
7	San José del Cabo, Mexico	7,161	Southwest
8	Montego Bay, Jamaica	6,569	Southwest
9	Puerto Vallarta, Mexico	2,075	Alaska

=== Airline market share ===
Busiest airlines serving STL (June 2025 – May 2026)
Rank	Airline	Passengers	Share
1	Southwest Airlines	9,433,125	63.1%
2	American Airlines	1,995,871	13.4%
3	Delta Air Lines	1,462,526	9.8%
4	United Airlines	1,071,949	7.2%
5	Frontier Airlines	541,912	3.6%
—	Others	441,643	3.0%

=== Annual traffic ===
Historical passenger activity at STL 1990–present
Year	Passengers	Year	Passengers	Year	Passengers	Year	Passengers
1990	20,005,675	2000	32,061,910	2010	12,808,463	2020	6,440,052
1991	19,938,260	2001	27,201,570	2011	13,171,332	2021	10,459,139
1992	22,065,287	2002	25,044,854	2012	13,179,604	2022	13,844,916
1993	21,266,019	2003	20,827,095	2013	13,152,127	2023	15,084,860
1994	24,877,478	2004	13,413,203	2014	12,877,848	2024	15,764,098
1995	27,249,931	2005	14,488,433	2015	13,002,443	2025	15,070,624
1996	28,934,045	2006	14,986,457	2016	14,044,236	2026	
1997	29,819,155	2007	15,229,146	2017	14,906,495	2027	
1998	30,437,193	2008	14,421,661	2018	15,749,131	2028	
1999	31,902,280	2009	12,954,627	2019	15,950,440	2029	

== Accidents and incidents ==
=== Accidents ===
- August 5, 1936: Chicago and Southern Flight 4, a Lockheed 10 Electra headed for Chicago, crashed after takeoff, killing all eight passengers and crew. The pilot became disoriented in fog.
- January 23, 1941: a Douglas DC-3 of Transcontinental & Western Air crashed 0.4 miles west of St. Louis Municipal Airport during a landing attempt in adverse weather, killing two occupants out of the 14 on board.
- August 1, 1943: during a demonstration flight of an "all St. Louis-built glider", a Waco CG-4A, USAAF serial 42-78839, built by sub-contractor Robertson Aircraft Company, lost its starboard wing due to a defective wing strut support and plummeted vertically to the ground at Lambert Field, killing all on board, including St. Louis Mayor William D. Becker; Maj. William B. Robertson and Harold Krueger, both of Robertson Aircraft; Thomas Dysart, president of the St. Louis Chamber of Commerce; Max Doyne, director of public utilities; Charles Cunningham, department comptroller; and Henry Mueller, St. Louis Court presiding judge. The failed component had been manufactured by Robertson subcontractor Gardner Metal Products Company, of St. Louis, which, coincidentally, had been a casket maker.
- September 6, 1944: the starboard engine of the sole completed McDonnell XP-67 prototype, USAAF serial 42-11677, caught fire during a test flight. Test pilot E.E. Elliot executed an emergency landing at Lambert Field and escaped, but the fire rapidly spread, destroying the aircraft. This was a crippling setback to the XP-67 program, which had been plagued by delays and technical problems, and the second prototype was only 15% complete, so flight testing could not promptly resume. The United States Army Air Forces deemed the XP-67 unnecessary and canceled the program.
- May 24, 1953: a Meteor Air Transport Douglas DC-3 crashed on approach to the airport, killing six of the seven people on board.
- February 28, 1966: astronauts Elliot See and Charles Bassett – the original crew of the Gemini 9 mission – were killed in the crash of their T-38 trainer while attempting to land at Lambert Field in bad weather. The aircraft crashed into the same McDonnell Aircraft Corporation building (adjacent to the airport) where their spacecraft was being assembled.
- March 20, 1968: a McDonnell F-4 Phantom II jet fighter crashed on takeoff during a test flight. The aircraft pitched up and stalled almost immediately after lifting from the runway; both crewmen were able to eject and were not seriously injured. The aircraft was destroyed in the ensuing explosion and fire. The crash was allegedly caused by a wrench socket, mistakenly left in the cockpit by maintenance crews, becoming lodged inside the control stick well on takeoff, jamming the stick in the full aft position.
- March 27, 1968: Ozark Air Lines Flight 965, a Douglas DC-9-15, collided with a Cessna 150F on a local training flight approximately 1.5 miles (2.4 km) north of the airport while both aircraft were on approach to runway 17. The Cessna was destroyed and both of its occupants were killed. The DC-9 sustained light damage and was able to land safely; none of its 44 passengers or five crewmembers were injured. The accident was attributed to inadequate visual flight rules (VFR) procedures in place at the airport, the failure of the DC-9 crew to spot the other aircraft in time, the Cessna crew's deviation from their traffic pattern instructions, and poor communications between the Cessna pilots and air traffic control.
- July 23, 1973: while on the approach to land at St. Louis International Airport, Ozark Air Lines Flight 809 crashed near the University of Missouri – St. Louis, killing 38 of the 44 persons on board. Wind shear was cited as the cause. A tornado had been reported at Ladue, Missouri, about the time of the accident but the National Weather Service did not confirm that there was a tornado.
- July 6, 1977: a Fleming International Airways Lockheed L-188 Electra, a cargo flight, crashed during the takeoff roll; all three occupants were killed.
- January 9, 1984: Douglas DC-3 registration C-GSCA of Skycraft Air Transport crashed on take-off, killing one of its two crew members. The aircraft was on an international cargo flight to Toronto Pearson International Airport, Canada. Both engines lost power shortly after take-off. The aircraft had been fueled with jet fuel instead of avgas.
- April 8, 1990: A Missouri Air National Guard F-4 Phantom II veered off the runway during takeoff, crashed, and burst into flames. The pilot suffered minor injuries after his ejection seat failed to deploy and he was forced to exit the burning wreckage while the weapons officer fractured his left leg when he ejected from the aircraft.
- November 22, 1994: TWA Flight 427 collided with a Cessna 441 Conquest, registration N441 km, at the intersection of runway 30R and taxiway Romeo. The TWA McDonnell Douglas MD-82 was taking off for Denver and had accelerated through 80 knots (150 km/h; 92 mph) when the collision occurred. The MD-82 sustained substantial damage during the collision. The Cessna 441, operated by Superior Aviation, was destroyed. The pilot and the passenger were killed. The investigation found the Cessna 441 had entered the wrong runway for its takeoff.
- September 28, 2007: American Airlines Flight 1400, an MD-82 from Lambert-St. Louis International Airport to O'Hare International Airport, suffered an engine fire on the left engine right after takeoff, and a partial hydraulic and electrical failure. The aircraft returned to Lambert-St Louis after a go-around where a successful emergency landing was made, after the nose gear had to be extended by the emergency landing gear extension procedure. No injuries were reported among the 138 passengers and crew, although the aircraft was substantially damaged. During the investigation it was determined that the captain and ground crew had started the engine using an unapproved method.
- February 12, 2025: United Airlines Flight 4427, a Bombardier CRJ-550 operated by GoJet Airlines from Dulles International Airport suffered a runway excursion while landing on Runway 11. There were no injuries.

== In popular culture ==
=== Film ===
- In the 1987 film Planes, Trains & Automobiles, Neal Page (Steve Martin) attempts to rent a car at Lambert, with disastrous consequences.
- Part of the 2006 film The Lucky Ones, set in Austin, Texas, was shot at Lambert.
- One scene from the 2009 film The Informant!, directed by Steven Soderbergh, was filmed at Lambert.
- The 2009 film Up in the Air was filmed in the St. Louis area, including in Lambert's Concourse D, between March 3 and the end of April 2009. In the film, George Clooney alludes to Lambert Field's rich history with the Wright Brothers and Charles Lindbergh.
- The 2017 film The Layover was partially filmed and set at Lambert Airport.

== See also ==
- List of airports in Missouri
- Missouri World War II Army Airfields
