= Curtiss-Robertson Airplane Manufacturing Company =

- Industry: Aircraft manufacturing
- Founded: November 9, 1927
- Key people: William B. Robertson
- Parent: Curtiss-Wright

Curtiss-Robertson Airplane Manufacturing Company was an American aircraft manufacturer formed to build the Curtiss Robin aircraft.

The company was founded on November 9, 1927, with a funding of $500,000. Initial production of its Curtiss Robin aircraft was at a factory in Garden City, Long Island. Production moved to St. Louis on August 7, 1928. On August 29, 1929, Curtiss had fully integrated Robertson into its business. In 1930, Travel Air was integrated into Curtiss-Robertson. In 1933, the company had fully merged with Curtiss-Wright with Robertson leaving.

== Aircraft ==
Summary of aircraft built by Curtiss-Robertson
Model name	First flight	Number built	Type
Curtiss Robin	1928	769	High-wing monoplane
Curtiss Kingbird	1930	19	Twin-engine high-wing monoplane
Curtiss 19L Coupe	1935	1	Lambert R-266 powered all-metal low-wing
Curtiss 19W Coupe	1935		CW-19 with 145 hp Warner Radial
