= Avco =

Aerospace company

Avco Corporation
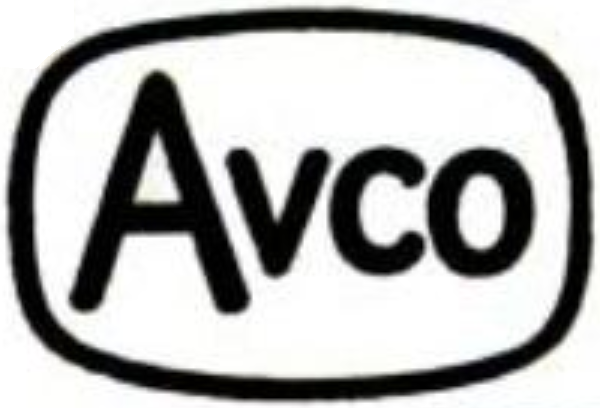
- Company type: Subsidiary
- Traded as: NYSE: AVC until 1984
- Industry: Aerospace industry; Arms industry
- Founded: 1929; 97 years ago in Wilmington, Delaware
- Headquarters: Greenwich, Connecticut, United States
- Area served: Worldwide
- Parent: Textron (1984–present)
- Website: textron.com

Avco Corporation is a subsidiary of Textron, which operates Textron Systems Corporation and Lycoming.

== History ==
The Aviation Corporation was formed on March 2, 1929, to prevent a takeover of CAM-24 airmail service operator Embry-Riddle Company by Clement Melville Keys, who planned on buying Curtiss aircraft rather than Sherman Fairchild's. With capital from Fairchild, George Hann, Lehman Brothers, and W. A. Harriman, the holding company began acquiring small airlines. By the end of 1929, it had acquired interests in over 90 aviation-related companies. In January 1930, the board broke off the airlines into Colonial and Universal Air Lines. Universal Air Lines name was changed to American Airways, and later merged with Colonial to form American Airlines.

The company was required to divest American Airlines in 1934 due to new rules for air mail contracts. The Aviation Corporation ranked 32nd among United States corporations in the value of World War II production contracts. Two months after World War II ended the Aviation Corporation branched into the manufacture of farm machinery with its acquisition of the New Idea Company in October 1945. The company later changed its name to Avco Manufacturing Corporation, and then, in 1959, to Avco Corporation. In 1984, Avco sold its farm machinery division to White Farm Equipment and Avco was purchased by Textron.

Avco's affiliated company, Avco Financial Services, was spun off to Associates First Capital Corporation in 1998, which itself was acquired by Citigroup in 2000.

=== Early companies bought or merged by Avco ===
- Aviation Corporation - formed March 29 1929
- Southern Air Transport
- Colonial Air Lines - May 1929
- Colonial Western - May 1929
- Canadian Colonial Airways - May 1929
- Embry-Riddle Aviation Corporation - Summer 1929, Embry-Riddle Flying School closed 1930
- Interstate Airlines - Summer 1929
- Fairchild Aircraft
- Wien Air Alaska
- Kreider-Reisner
- The Superplane Company
- Universal Air Line System Terminal Company
- Midplane Sales and Transit Company
- Northern Airplane Company
- Air Transportation, Inc.
- Robertson Flying School Inc.
- Egyptian Airways Inc.
- Universal Aviation Corporation - bought by Avco in 1930
- Universal Aviation Schools
- Roosevelt Field, New York
- Curtiss Field
- Southwest Air Fast Express - June 1931

== Timeline ==
- 1929 Aviation Corporation (AVCO) holding company formed by multiple participants
- 1932 Airplane Development Corporation formed as a subsidiary of the Cord Corporation by Gerard F. "Jerry" Vultee
- 1934 AVCO acquired the Airplane Development Corporation from Cord and formed the Aviation Manufacturing Corporation (AMC)
- 1936 AMC liquidated to form the Vultee Aircraft Division, an autonomous subsidiary of AVCO
- 1939 Vultee Aircraft Division of AVCO reorganized as an independent company known as Vultee Aircraft, Inc.
- 1940 Barkley-Grow Aircraft acquired by AVCO
- 1941 Consolidated Aircraft Corporation sold to AVCO
- 1943 Consolidated-Vultee, known as Convair, formed by the merger of Consolidated Aircraft and Vultee Aircraft; still controlled by AVCO
- 1945 AVCO acquired the New Idea Company from the heirs of Joseph Oppenheim, who founded the farm machinery manufacturer in 1899
- 1945 AVCO acquired Crosley Corporation from Powel Crosley Jr.
- 1947 Convair acquired by the Atlas Corporation
- 1947 AVCO name changed to Avco Manufacturing Corporation
- 1951 Purchased Bendix Home Appliances, South Bend, Indiana manufacturer of automatic clothes washers, combining Bendix Appliances with Crosley Appliances
- 1956 Avco sold Bendix Home Appliances to Philco
- 1959 Avco Manufacturing Corporation name changed to Avco Corporation
- 1966 Avco acquired Carte Blanche charge cards from First National City Bank
- 1967 Avco acquired Embassy Pictures
- 1968 Avco acquired the developer of Rancho Bernardo, San Diego
- 1971 Avco acquires a stake in the developer of Laguna Niguel, California
- 1975-1977 Crosley Broadcasting stations divested
- 1976 Sold rights to Crosley Appliances to Crosley Corporation, a new distributor who contracted for appliances from companies such as Whirlpool Corporation and Electrolux
- 1978 Sold Carte Blanche to Citibank
- 1982 Sold Embassy Pictures to Norman Lear and Jerry Perenchio
- 1984 Avco sold the New Idea line of farm machinery to Allied Corporation, which then purchased the White Farm Equipment, forming White-New Idea
- 1984 Textron acquired Avco Corporation, renamed it Avco Systems Textron
- 1985 Avco Systems Textron became Textron Defense Systems
- 1995 Textron Systems Corporation created, consisting of what is now Textron Defense Systems, Textron Marine & Land Systems, and Lycoming

== Locations ==
- Coldwater, Ohio (1945 - 1984)
- Stratford Army Engine Plant (1951 - 1976)
- Connersville, Indiana (1937 - 1960) AVCO purchases assets of Cord's Auburn Automobile Company in 1937. Manufactures kitchen appliances until sale in 1959 to Design and Manufacturing dishwasher division. Manufactures 500,000 Jeep bodies for Overland and Ford during WWII. 1959 AVCO sells to Sam Reginstrief, 1960 AVCO sells to HH Robertson and moves munitions to Richmond, Indiana, former Crosley Plant.
- Nashville, Tennessee (1959 - 1985)

== See also ==
- Avco World Trophy
- AVCOAT 5026-39
- Crosley Broadcasting Corporation (later Avco Broadcasting Corporation)
- M2 (railcar) (part of this series was built by Avco)
