= Fokker F-32 =

1920s four-engined airliner

F-32
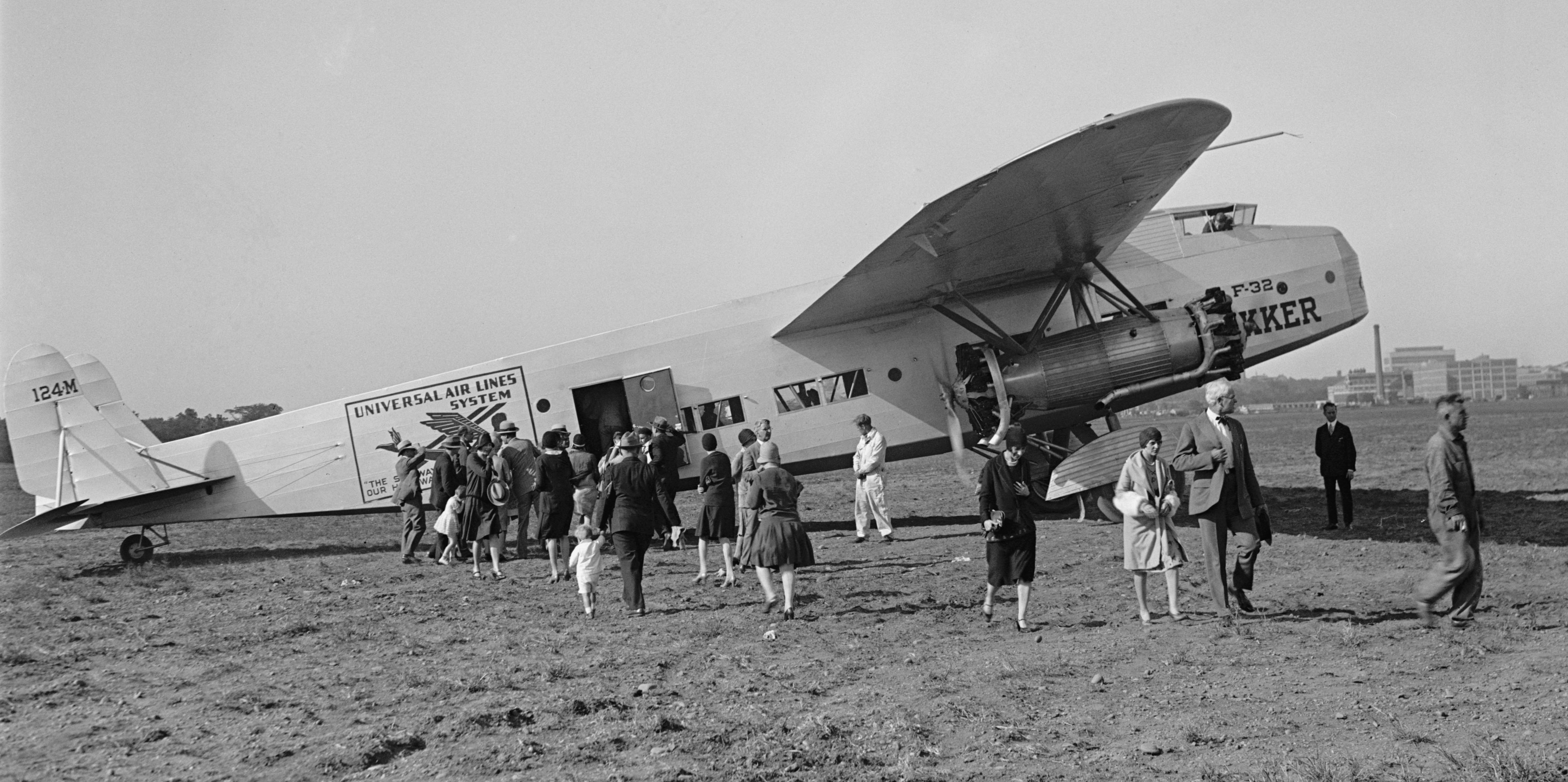
- An F-32 painted for Universal Air Lines System on September 25, 1929.

General information
- Type: Passenger aircraft
- Manufacturer: Fokker Aircraft Corporation of America
- Primary users: Western Air Express Universal Air Lines; United States Army Air Corps
- Number built: 7

History
- First flight: September 13, 1929

The Fokker F-32 was a passenger aircraft built by the Fokker Aircraft Corporation of America in 1929 in their Teterboro, New Jersey factory. It was the first four-engined aircraft designed and built in the United States. Ten examples were built, but they only entered limited commercial service; their high cost and problems with the cooling of the aft engines proved prohibitive. The United States Army Air Corps evaluated the F-32 as the YC-20, but did not purchase it.

== Design and development ==
=== Power issues ===
The F-32's most notable problem was that it was underpowered, which was made worse by the aircraft's back-to-back engine configuration, with an engine on each end of the underwing nacelles. The front engine powered a two-bladed propeller and the rear engine a three-bladed one. The aft propellers, working in the disturbed air from the front, were inefficient, and their engines suffered from cooling problems. The underpowering problem was partially solved by replacing the prototype's Pratt & Whitney Wasp engines with more powerful Pratt & Whitney R-1860 Hornet Bs on later planes, but the other issues remained with the planes throughout their short service lives.

== Operational history ==
=== Orders ===
Initially, Western Air Express and Universal Air Lines each ordered five aircraft, and there was interest from other airlines, including KLM (Royal Dutch Airlines). However, despite the painting of a prototype for Universal, they cancelled their order, and WAE only picked up two instead of the planned five, largely because of the Great Depression.

=== Service with Western Air Express ===
Western Air Express were the only purchasers of the F-32, buying two of them. They operated out of Alhambra Airport in Alhambra, California and later Grand Central Air Terminal in Glendale, California, flying to Oakland International Airport (Oakland, California) and other West Coast destinations.

=== U.S. Army Air Corps trial ===
In 1930, the U.S. Army Air Corps borrowed an F-32 for testing, designating it YC-20. Just as with the Boeing Y1C-18, the aircraft remained the property of the manufacturer and was returned after testing. It was the largest transport aircraft tested by the USAAC, at the time, and would remain so until the late 1930s.

=== Crash ===
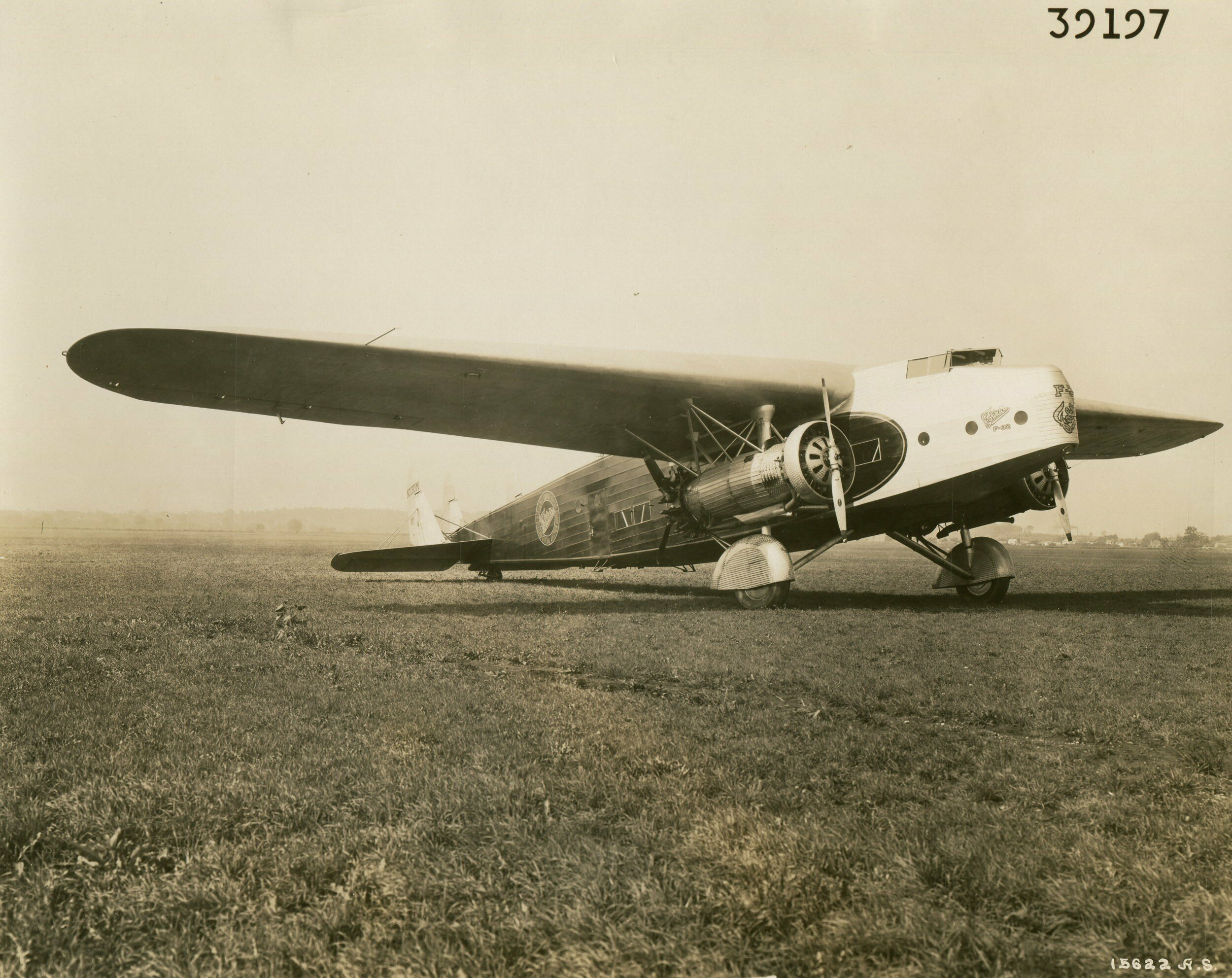
F-32 demonstrator

The first F-32 crashed on November 27, 1929, during a demonstration of a three-engined takeoff from Roosevelt Field on Long Island, New York. One of the two port engines was stopped, but the other failed shortly after takeoff, causing a loss of control. The aircraft came down on a house in nearby Carle Place, and was totally destroyed in the crash and subsequent fire. Nobody was killed, although the pilot, M.F. Boggs, and a mechanic, Harry MacDonald, who were thrown clear as the plane first struck the roof, escaped serious injury.

This crash was witnessed by famous American poet Ogden Nash, who wrote of it to his then-fiancée Frances (later his wife). Nash's account is found in Loving Letters from Ogden Nash: A Family Album, edited by Linell Nash Smith (Nash's daughter).

== Operators ==
United States

- Universal Air Lines
- United States Army Air Corps
- Western Air Express

== Specifications ==
Data from The Illustrated Encyclopedia of Propeller Airliners, Handbook for the structure and design of aircraft.

General characteristics

- Crew: 2–3
- Capacity:
  - 32 sitting passengers
  - 16 sleeping passengers
- Length: 69 ft 10 in (21.29 m)
- Wingspan: 99 ft 0 in (30.18 m)
- Height: 16 ft 6 in (5.03 m)
- Wing area: 1,329 sq ft (123.5 m^{2})
- Empty weight: 13,542 lb (6,143 kg)
- Gross weight: 24,250 lb (11,000 kg)
- Powerplant: 4 × Pratt & Whitney R-1860 Hornet B 9-cyl. air-cooled radial piston engine, 575 hp (429 kW) each
- Propellers: 3-bladed metal propellers

Performance

- Maximum speed: 120 kn (140 mph, 230 km/h)
- Range: 430 nmi (500 mi, 800 km)
