= Curtiss Robin =

American monoplane introduced in 1928

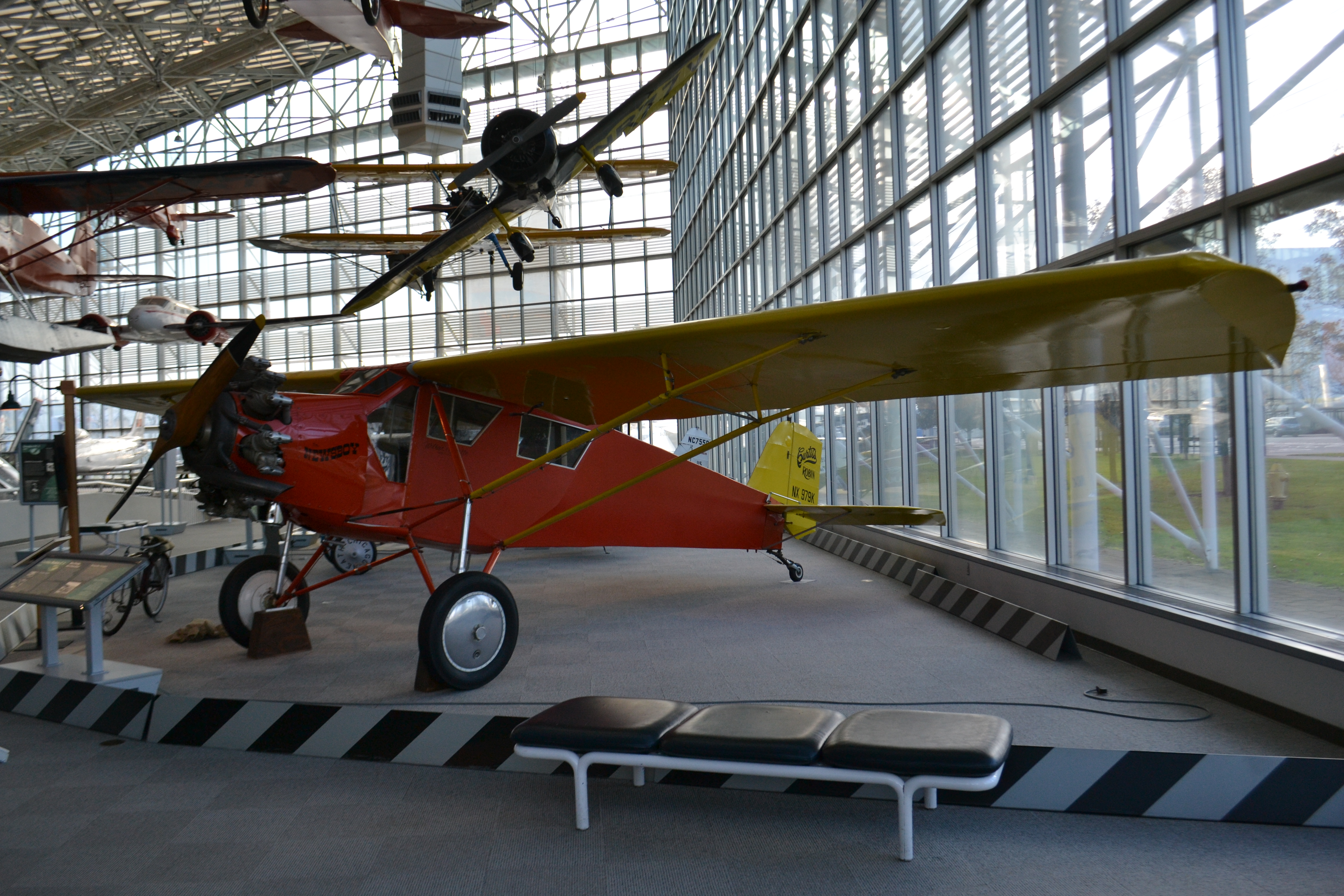
- A Curtiss Robin in The Museum of Flight, Tukwila Washington, 2011

General information
- Type: Touring
- Manufacturer: Curtiss-Robertson Airplane Manufacturing Company
- Status: A number still flying
- Primary user: U. S. Private Owner Market
- Number built: 769

History
- Introduction date: 1928
- First flight: 7 August 1928

The Curtiss Robin, introduced in 1928, is an American high-wing monoplane built by the Curtiss-Robertson Airplane Manufacturing Company. The J-1 version was flown by Wrong Way Corrigan who crossed the Atlantic after being refused permission to do so.

== Design ==
The Robin, a workmanlike cabin monoplane, had a wooden wing and steel tubing fuselage. The cabin accommodated three persons; two passengers were seated side-by-side behind the pilot. Early Robins were distinguished by large flat fairings over the parallel diagonal wing bracing struts; the fairings were abandoned on later versions, having been found to be ineffective in creating lift. The original landing gear had bungee rubber cord shock absorbers, later replaced by an oleo-pneumatic system; a number of Robins had twin floats added. Variants of the Robin were fitted with engines which developed 90–185 hp (67–138 kW).

== Operational history ==
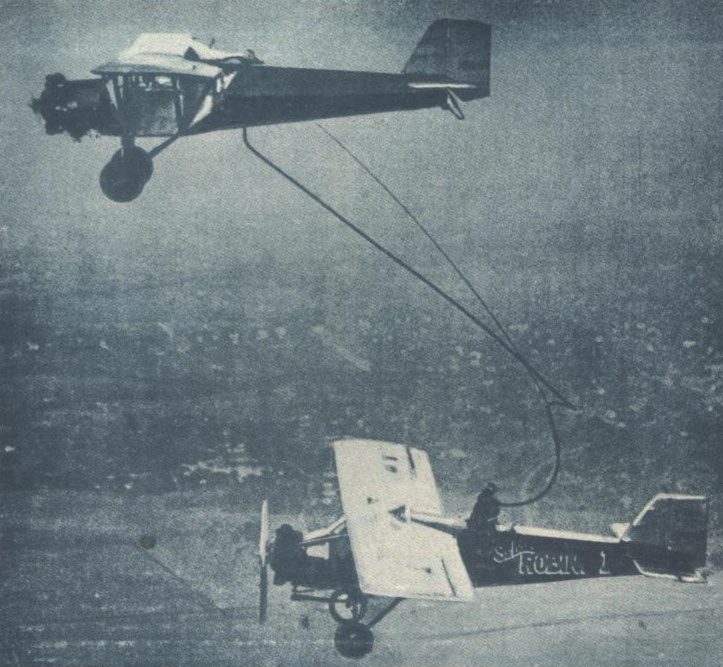
The aircraft Curtiss Robin "St. Louis" (right) during a record endurance flight 13-30 July 1929, at St. Louis, Missouri, flown by Dale Jackson and Forest O'Brine for 17 days, 12 hours, 17 minutes

A single modified Robin (with a 110 hp (82 kW) Warner R-420-1) was used by the United States Army Air Corps, and designated the XC-10. This aircraft was used in a test program for radio-controlled (and unmanned) flight.

Cuba's national airline, Compañía Nacional Cubana de Aviación Curtiss, was founded in 1929 with the Curtiss-Wright company serving as its co-founder and major investor. The airline's first aircraft was a Curtiss Robin and it was flown on domestic routes as a mail and passenger transport.

From September 1929 to May 1930 a Robin C-1 was used to deliver the McCook, Nebraska Daily Gazette to communities in rural Nebraska and Kansas. The airplane flew a nonstop route of 380 miles (610 km) daily, dropping bundles of newspapers from a height of 500 feet (150 m) to local carriers.

A Curtiss Robin C was purchased by the Paraguayan government in 1932 for the transport squadron of its air arm. It was intensively used as a VIP transport plane and air ambulance during the Chaco War (1932–1935).

== Variants (Model 50) ==
Data from:Curtiss aircraft : 1907-1947

Challenger Robin
(Model 50A) An early version of the Robin, powered by a 165 hp (123 kW) Curtiss Challenger radial piston engine.
Comet Robin
One Robin was converted by its owner in 1937, fitted with a 150 hp (110 kW) Comet 7-D radial piston engine.
Robin
(Model 50A) Prototypes and initial production aircraft powered by 90 hp (67 kW) Curtiss OX-5 engines.
Robin B
A three-seat cabin monoplane, fitted with wheel brakes and a steerable tailwheel, powered by a 90 hp (67 kW) Curtiss OX-5 V-8 engine; about 325 were built.
Robin B-2
A three-seat cabin monoplane, powered by a 150–180 hp (110–130 kW) Wright-Hisso "A","E" and "I" V-8 water-cooled piston engine.
Robin C
A three-seat cabin monoplane, powered by a 170 hp (130 kW) or 185 hp (138 kW) Curtiss Challenger radial piston engine; about 50 built.

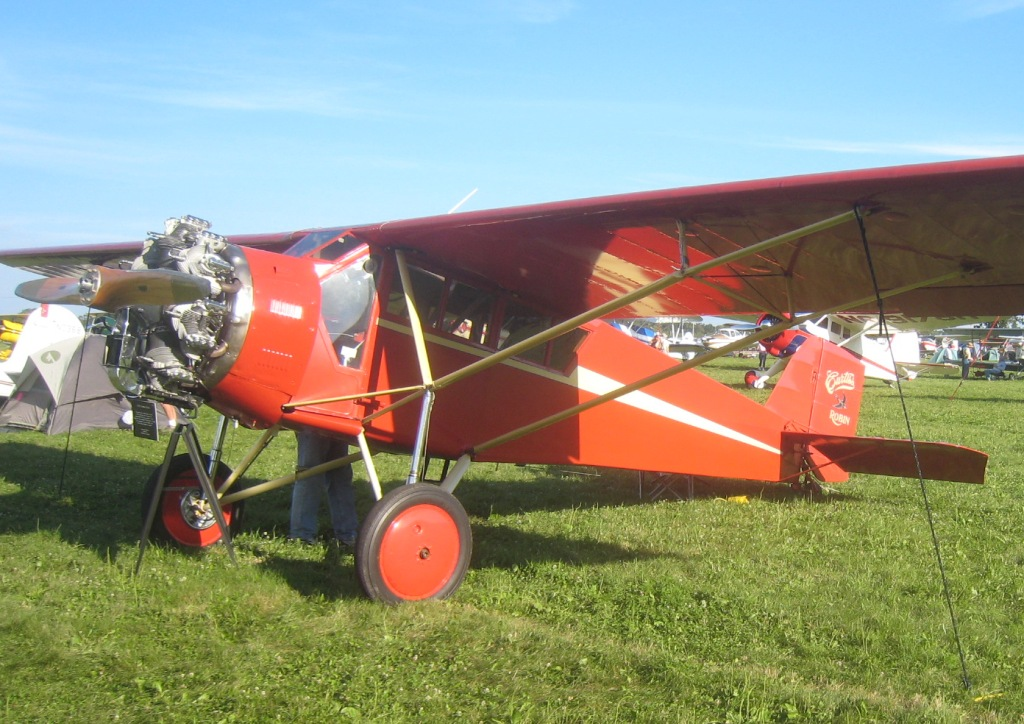
1929 Curtis Robin C-1 used for the movie Pearl (modified with an Lycoming R-680)

Robin C-1
(Model 50C) An improved version of the Robin C, powered by a 185 hp (138 kW) Curtiss Challenger radial piston engine; over 200 built.
Robin C-2
(Model 50D) A long-range version fitted with an extra fuel tank, powered by a 170 hp (130 kW) Curtiss Challenger radial piston engine; six built.
Robin 4C
(Model 50E) A four-seat version, powered by a Curtiss Challenger radial piston engine; one built.
Robin 4C-1
A three-seat version with an enlarged forward fuselage section; three built.
Robin 4C-1A
(Model 50G) Another four-seat version with an enlarged forward fuselage section; 11 built.
Robin 4C-2
A single un-certified version powered by a 225 hp (168 kW) Wright J-6-7 Whirlwind engine.
Robin CR
A one-off experimental version, fitted with a 120 hp (89 kW) Curtiss Crusader engine.
Robin J-1
(Model 50H) Powered by a 165 hp (123 kW) Wright J-6-5 Whirlwind radial piston engine; about 40 built.
Robin J-2
(Model 50I) A long-range version, with 80 US gal (67 imp gal; 300 L) fuel. Two were built
Robin J-3
A J-1 temporarily designated J-3, which reverted to the J-1 designation after being de-modified.
Robin M
A Robin B aircraft, fitted with the 115 hp (86 kW) Milwaukee Tank V-502 V-8 engine (air-cooled OX-5 conversions).
Robin W
(Model 50J) Powered by a 110 hp (82 kW) Warner Scarab radial piston engine. Only a small number were built in 1930.

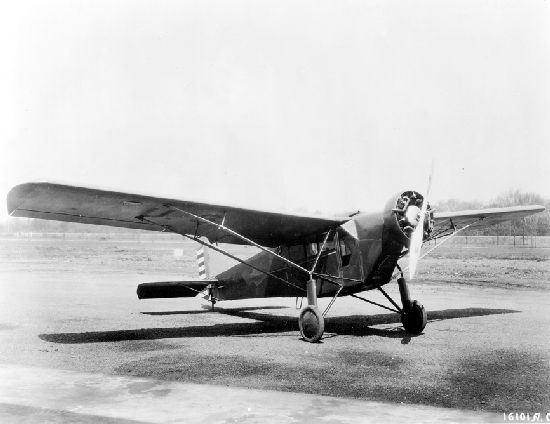
The XC-10 in 1930

XC-10
One Robin W was sold to the United States Army Air Corps (USAAC) and converted into an unmanned pilot-less radio-controlled test aircraft, powered by a 110 hp (82 kW) Warner R-420-1.

== Operators ==
=== Military operators ===
Paraguay

- Paraguayan Air Force

United States

- United States Army Air Corps

== Surviving aircraft ==
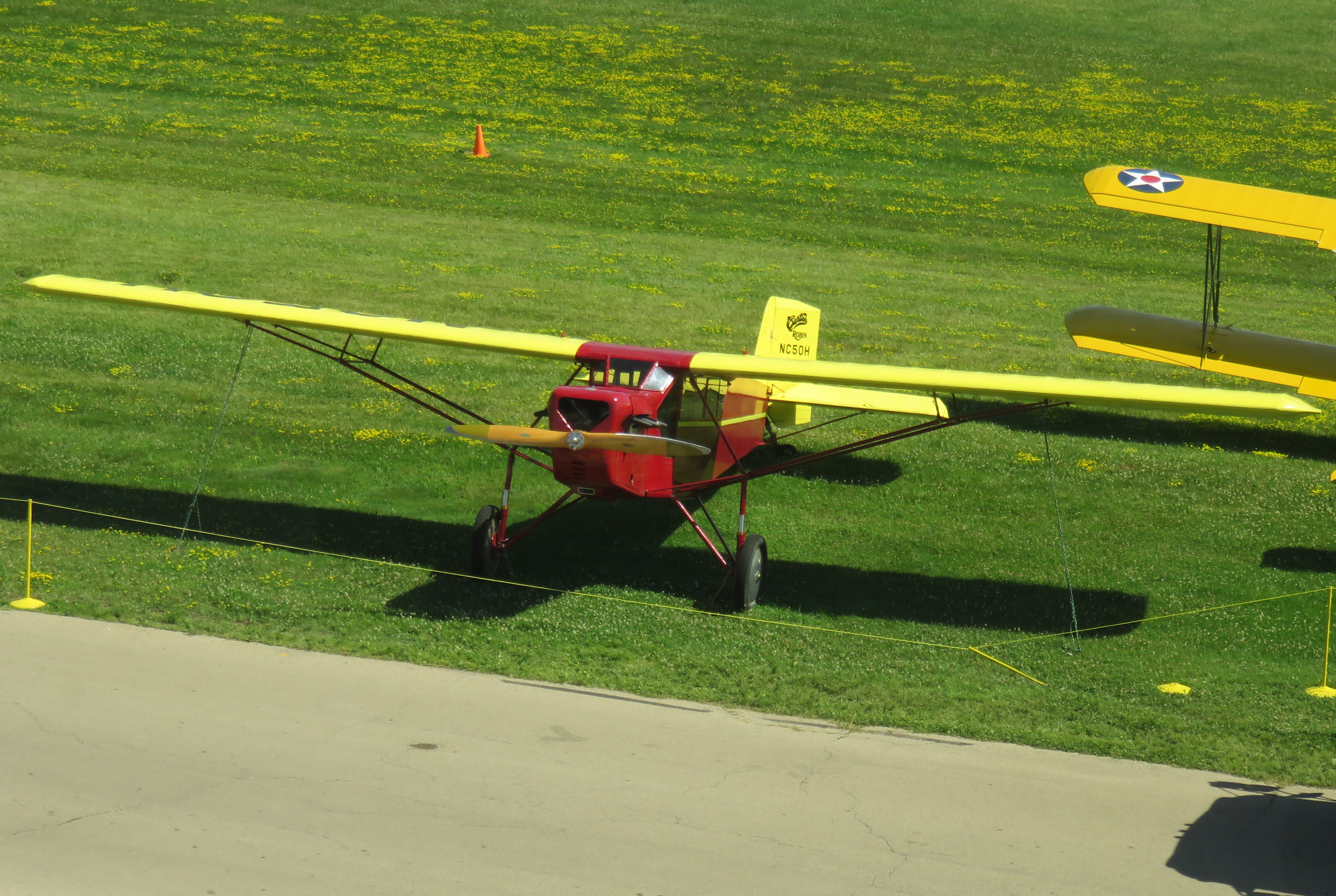
Curtis Robin B-2 display

=== Australia ===
- 477 – J-1 airworthy with John Graeme Vevers of Patterson Lakes, Victoria.

=== Brazil ===
- 248 – C-2 in storage at the TAM Museum in São Carlos, São Paulo.

=== Canada ===
- 405 – C-1 on display at the Reynolds-Alberta Museum in Wetaskiwin, Alberta.

=== Costa Rica ===
- C-1 on display at the Juan Santamaría International Airport domestic terminal in Alajuela, Costa Rica.

=== Germany ===
- 130 – J-1 airworthy with Antique Aeroflyers in Mengen, Baden-Württemberg.

=== United States ===
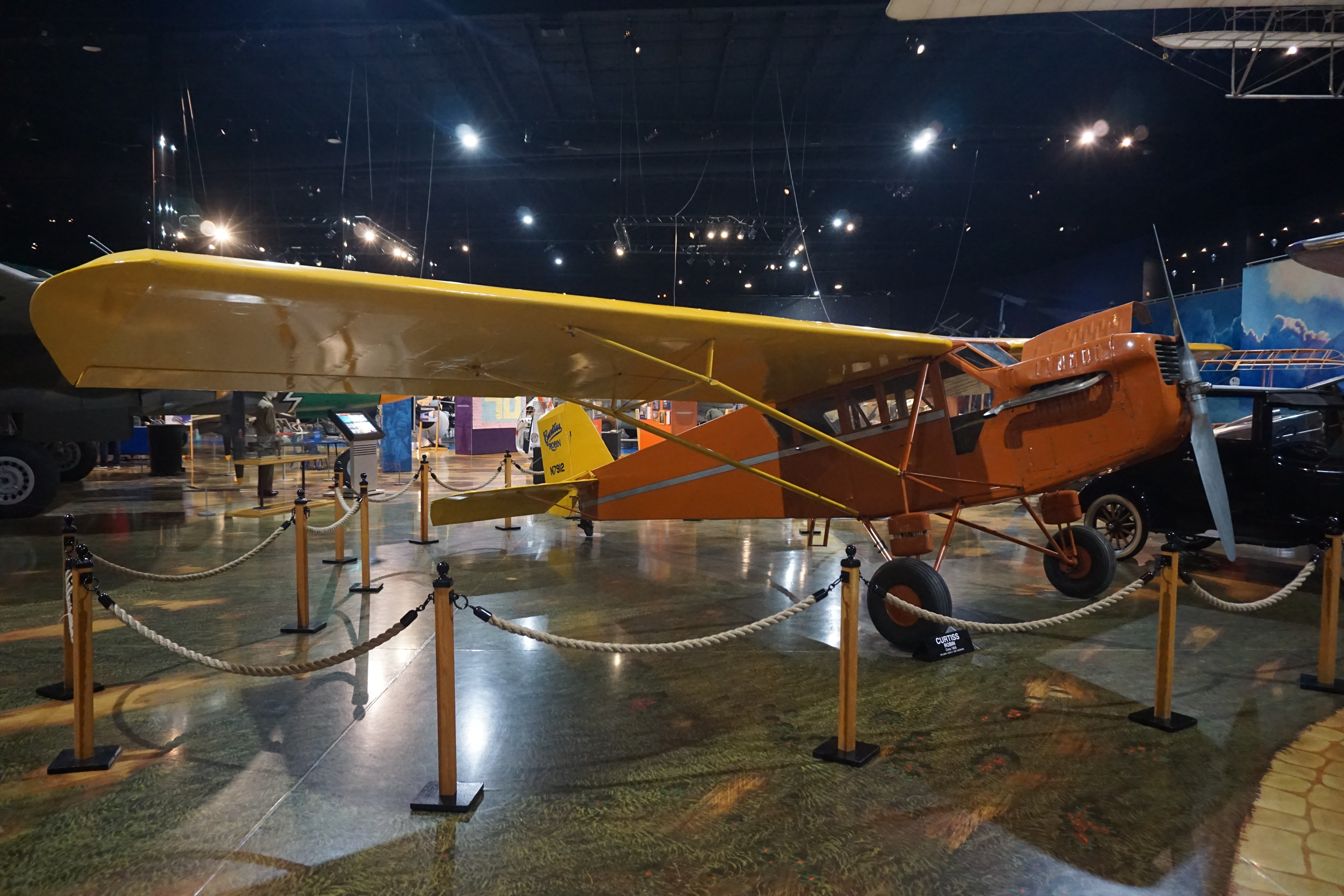
Curtiss Robin at the Air Zoo

- 193 – B airworthy at the Fantasy of Flight in Polk City, Florida.
- 213 – B airworthy at the Western Antique Aeroplane & Automobile Museum in Hood River, Oregon.
- 329 – B-1 on static display at the San Diego Air & Space Museum in San Diego, California.
- 337 – C-1 on static display at the Evergreen Aviation & Space Museum in McMinnville, Oregon.
- 403 – B-2 on display at the EAA Aviation Museum in Oshkosh, Wisconsin.
- 469 – C-1 on display at the Yanks Air Museum in Chino, California.
- 628 – C-1 on static display at the Museum of Flight in Seattle, Washington.
- 712 – 4C-1A on display at the Western North Carolina Air Museum in Hendersonville, North Carolina.
- 733 – J-1D on display at the Shannon Air Museum in Fredericksburg, Virginia. It was previously on display at the Virginia Aviation Museum.
- 737 – J-1 airworthy with Brian T. Coughlin of Cazenovia, New York. It is based at Old Rhinebeck Aerodrome.
- J-1 Ole Miss (US registration NR526N) on static display at the National Air and Space Museum in Washington, D.C. that set the aviation endurance record in 1935 (continuously airborne June 4-July 1), which it held for 4 years.
- On static display at the Cradle of Aviation Museum in Garden City, New York. It has floats in place of wheeled landing gear.
- On display at the Air Zoo in Portage, Michigan.
- On display at the Eagles Mere Air Museum in Eagles Mere, Pennsylvania.
- On static display at the Glenn H. Curtiss Museum in Hammondsport, New York.
- On display at the Historic Aircraft Restoration Museum in Maryland Heights, Missouri.
- Under restoration at the Candler Field Museum in Williamson, Georgia. Now owned and operated by Capt. Buerk’s Living History Museum in New Hampshire.
- Under restoration at the Port Townsend Aero Museum in Port Townsend, Washington.

== Specifications (Robin OX-5) ==
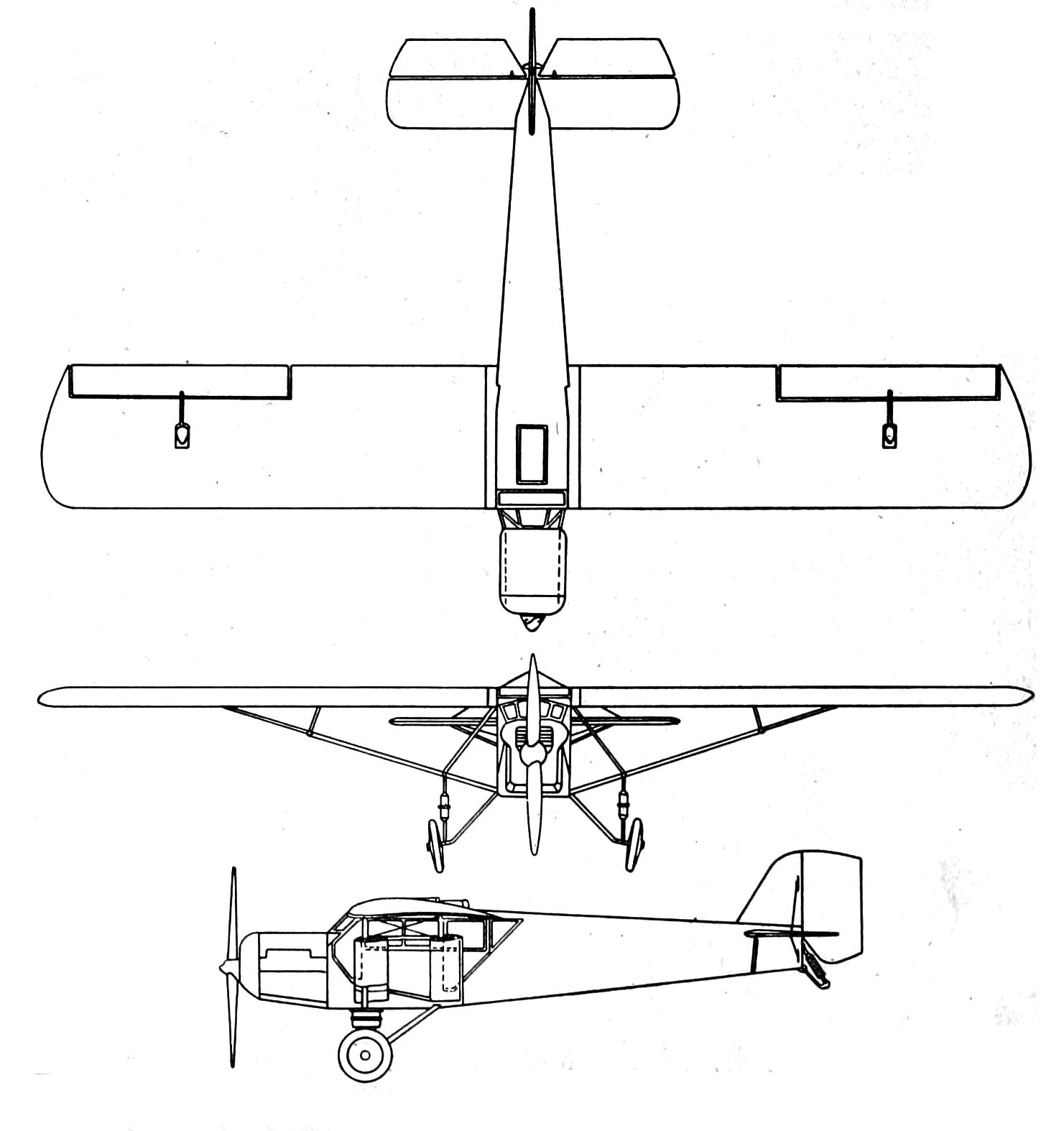
Curtiss Robin 3-view drawing from Aero Digest October 1928

Data from Curtiss Aircraft 1907–1947, Jane's all the World's Aircraft 1928

General characteristics

- Crew: 1
- Capacity: 2 pax / 425 lb (193 kg) payload
- Length: 25 ft 9 in (7.85 m)
- Wingspan: 41 ft 0 in (12.5 m)
- Height: 7 ft 10 in (2.4 m)
- Wing area: 262.5 sq ft (24.39 m^{2})
- Airfoil: Curtiss C-72
- Empty weight: 1,475 lb (669 kg)
- Max takeoff weight: 2,175 lb (987 kg)
- Fuel capacity: 50 US gal (42 imp gal; 190 L) fuel; 5 US gal (4.2 imp gal; 19 L) oil
- Powerplant: 1 × Curtiss OX-5 V-8 water-cooled piston engine, 90 hp (67 kW)
- Propellers: 2-bladed fixed pitch propeller

Performance

- Maximum speed: 99.7 mph (160.5 km/h, 86.6 kn)
- Cruise speed: 85 mph (137 km/h, 74 kn)
- Landing speed: 45 mph (39 kn; 72 km/h)
- Range: 785 mi (1,263 km, 682 nmi) cruising; 580 mi (500 nmi; 930 km) at full throttle
- Service ceiling: 12,500 ft (3,800 m)
- Rate of climb: 450 ft/min (2.3 m/s)
- Time to altitude: 3,800 ft (1,200 m) in 10 minutes
- Wing loading: 8.2 lb/sq ft (40 kg/m^{2})
- Power/mass: 0.0465 hp/lb (0.0764 kW/kg)

== See also ==
Related development

- Curtiss Thrush

Related lists

- List of military aircraft of the United States
- List of civil aircraft

== Bibliography ==
- Hagedorn, Dan (March–May 1992). "Curtiss Types in Latin America". Air Enthusiast. No. 45. pp. 61–77. ISSN 0143-5450.
