= Travel Air Model 10 =

Single-engined aircraft

General information
- Type: Civil utility aircraft
- National origin: United States of America
- Manufacturer: Travel Air
- Number built: 12

History
- First flight: 1929

The Travel Air Model 10 was a 4-seat single-engined light aircraft of the late 1920s. Twelve aircraft were built before production ended.

== Design and development ==
In 1929, the Travel Air Manufacturing Company of Wichita, Kansas, unveiled the Model 10, a four-seat light aircraft of similar layout to the larger Travel Air 6000 airliner, intended for use as an air taxi and charter aircraft. Like the Model 6000, the Model 10 was the work of Herb Rawdon, and was a single-engined monoplane with a braced, high wing, a fixed tailwheel undercarriage and an enclosed cabin. It was of mixed construction, with a fabric covered steel-tube fuselage and a wooden wing, with spruce spars and spruce and plywood ribs. The prototype was initially powered by a 300 hp (220 kW) Wright J-6-9 Whirlwind 9-cylinder radial engine, but was later modified with a 185 hp (138 kW) Curtis Challenger radial before finally being fitted with a 225 hp (168 kW) 7-cylinder Wright J-6-7 Whirlwind.

It was planned to offer the Model 10 with a range of engines, but owing to the effects of the Great Depression in reducing demand for aircraft, production only followed of the Model 10-D, powered by a Wright J-6-7. This was initially priced at $11,250, but this price soon fell to $8,495. Despite this, only eleven Model 10-Bs were built, and production was ended after Travel Air was purchased by the Curtiss-Wright Corporation. Curtiss-Wright built a four-seat aircraft of similar layout in 1931, designed by the ex-Travel Air engineer Walter Burnham, the Curtiss-Wright CW-15, but this too sold poorly, with only 15 CW-15s built.

== Variants ==
Model 10-B
Initial prototype, powered by Wright J-6-9 Whirlwind.
Model 10-D
Production model, powered by Wright J-6-7 Whirlwind. Eleven built.

== Specifications (10-D) ==
Data from Beech Aircraft and their Predecessors

General characteristics

- Crew: 1
- Capacity: 3 passengers
- Length: 26 ft 10 in (8.18 m)
- Wingspan: 43 ft 6 in (13.26 m)
- Height: 8 ft 8 in (2.64 m)
- Wing area: 239 sq ft (22.2 m^{2})
- Airfoil: Göttingen 593
- Empty weight: 2,130 lb (966 kg)
- Gross weight: 3,400 lb (1,542 kg)
- Powerplant: 1 × Wright J-6-7 Whirlwind 7-cylinder radial engine, 225 hp (168 kW)

Performance

- Maximum speed: 126 mph (203 km/h, 109 kn) at sea level
- Cruise speed: 106 mph (171 km/h, 92 kn)
- Range: 550 mi (890 km, 480 nmi)
- Service ceiling: 13,000 ft (4,000 m)
- Rate of climb: 675 ft/min (3.43 m/s)
