= CRG =

CRG may refer to:

== Companies and organizations ==
=== Companies ===
- CRG (kart manufacturer), an Italian chassis manufacturer
- CRG West, a privately held, wholly owned subsidiary of The Carlyle Group established in 2001
- Cargoitalia ICAO airline designator
- The Gazette (Cedar Rapids), a Cedar Rapids newspaper
- Colonial Radio Group, the owner of several radio stations in the United States
- Communications Research Group, a data communications software company
- Control Risks Group, a private risk consultancy firm
- Cory Rooney Group, a music label

=== Other organizations ===
- Classification Research Group (Library and information science)
- CRG Gallery, a contemporary art gallery in Chelsea, New York, U.S.
- Centre for Genomic Regulation, a genomics research centre based on Barcelona
- Corporate Responsibility Group, a UK professional association
- Cultural Revolution Group, a 1966 Chinese organisation
- Centre for Research on Globalization, a Canadian conspiracy theory publisher founded by Michel Chossudovsky
- COVID Recovery Group, a group of British Conservative MPs
- Cardiff Rivers Group, an environmental charity in Cardiff, Wales

== Other uses ==
- Carolina Rollergirls, an all-women, flat-track roller derby
- Waco CRG or Waco G series, an early 1930s American open-cockpit sporting biplane
- Council for Responsible Genetics, a public interest group with a focus on biotechnology
- Craig Municipal Airport IATA airport code
- a trim level of the 1984 Japanese Toyota Van
- Postnominal letters of a Commander of the Order of the Republic of the Gambia
- Michif language ISO 639-3 code
