= Consolidated Model 12 =

Condolidated Model 12 might refer to two closely related aircraft types manufactured by Consolidated Aircraft:

- Consolidated Model 12: the NY-2 variant of the Consolidated NY (Consolidated Model 2)
- Consolidated Model 12 Husky: the Consolidated PT-3
