= Curtiss Fledgling =

1927 trainer aircraft family by Curtiss

Model 48, Model 51, and N2C Fledgling
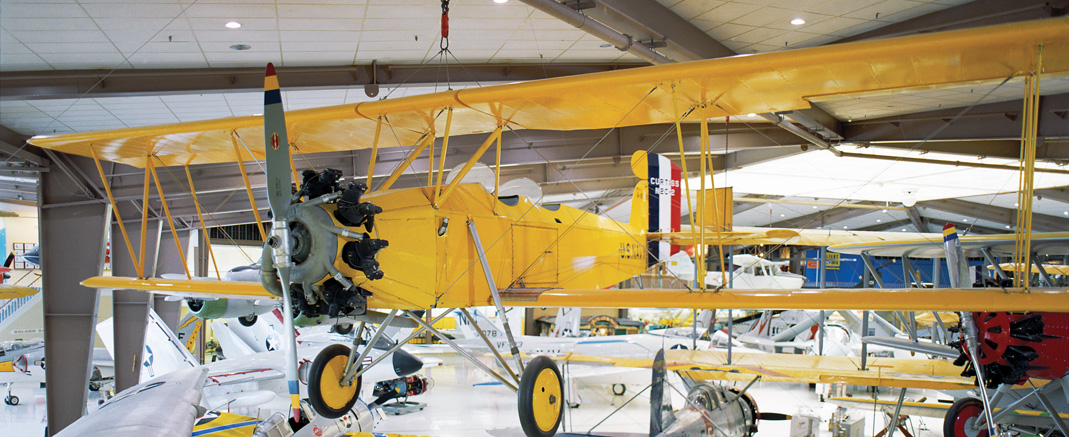
- A Curtiss N2C-2 at the National Museum of Naval Aviation

General information
- Type: Trainer
- Manufacturer: Curtiss
- Primary users: United States Navy Curtiss Flying Service
- Number built: c. 160

History
- First flight: 1927
- Variants: Curtiss Lark; Curtiss Carrier Pigeon

The Curtiss Fledgling, known internally to Curtiss as the Model 48 and Model 51 is a trainer aircraft developed for the United States Navy in the late 1920s and known in that service as the N2C.

== Design and development ==
The Fledgling was designed in response to a 1927 Navy requirement for a new primary trainer, and was selected after evaluation in competition with fourteen other submissions. The Fledgling was a conventional biplane design with two-bay, staggered wings of equal span braced with N-struts. The pilot and instructor sat in tandem, open cockpits, and the fixed tailskid undercarriage could be easily swapped for a large central pontoon and outrigger floats under the wings for seaplane training. The Navy ordered two batches of the Fledgling, each powered by different versions of the Wright Whirlwind engine, both of which were built under the Curtiss designation Model 48.

Believing the design to have commercial potential, Curtiss developed the Model 51 as a civil equivalent powered by the less powerful Curtiss Challenger engine. The company operated 109 of these aircraft in its own air taxi service, the Curtiss Flying Service during the 1930s. A number of these aircraft were experimentally fitted with the same Wright engines used in their military counterparts as the J-1 and J-2, but these were not produced in quantity. Another experimental variant, the reduced-wingspan Fledgling Junior was produced to the extent of a single prototype only. A number of Model 51s were exported to foreign military services for evaluation: four to Canada and one to Czechoslovakia, but these did not lead to any purchases. Curtiss also delivered at least seven N2C-1 kits to Turkey in 1933, as part of an agreement to produce the Curtiss Hawk Model 35 under licence in Turkey. These N2C-1s were used as trainers and liaison aircraft by the Turkish Air Force until 1945. At least one N2C-1 is thought to have been given to Iran as a gift from the Turkish Air Force.

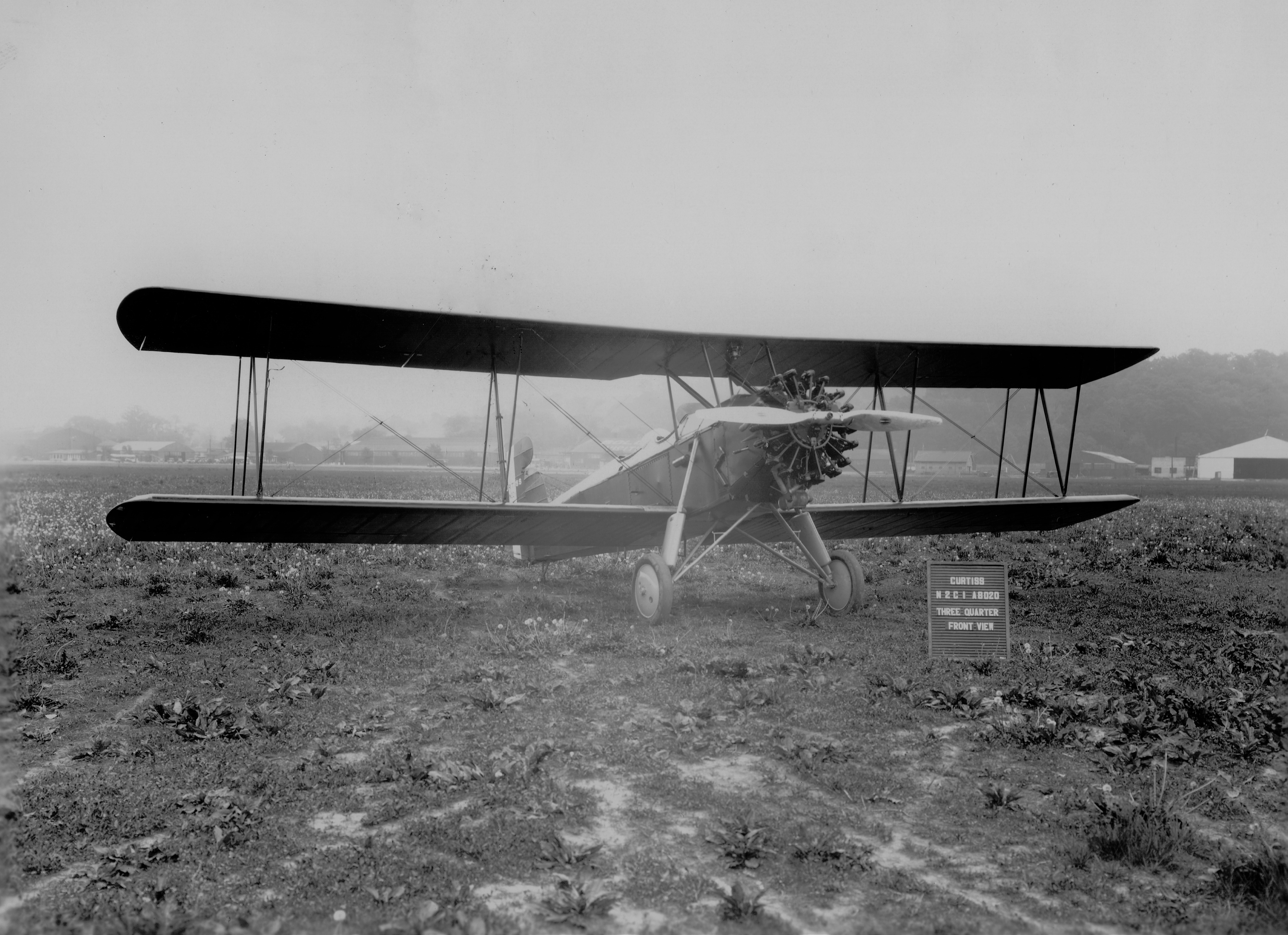
Curtiss Fledgling N2C1 on display. 3/4 front view

== Variants ==
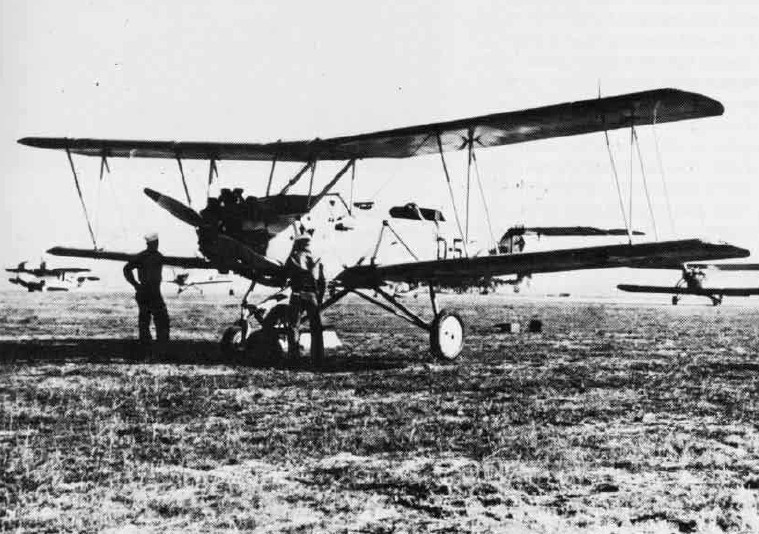
An N2C-2 target drone, in 1938/39.

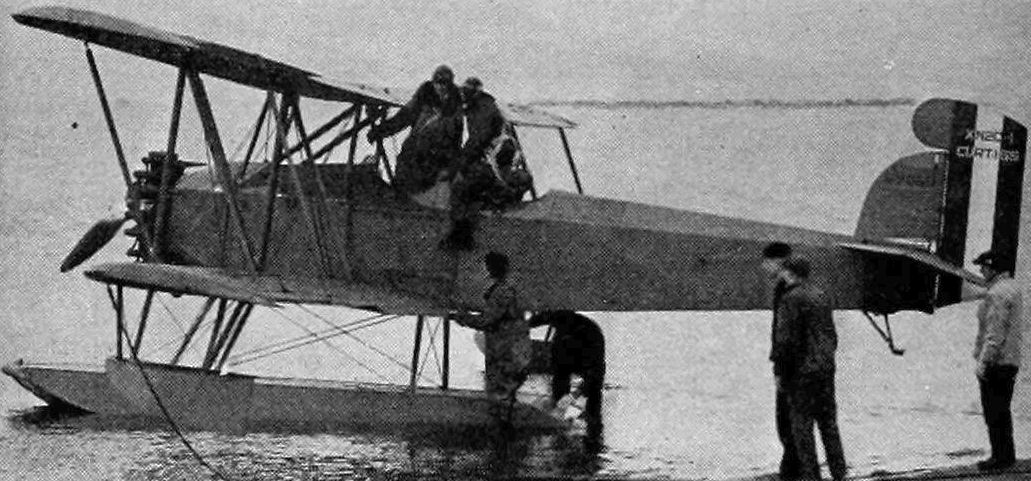
Curtiss XN2C-1 floatplane photo from Aero Digest April 1928

Model 48

XN2C-1
Navy prototypes (3 built)
N2C-1
Navy version powered by Wright J-5 Whirlwind (31 built)
N2C-2
Navy version powered by Wright J-6-7 Whirlwind (20 built)

Model 51

Fledgling
commercial version with Curtiss Challenger engine (109 built)
J-1
commercial version with Wright J-6-5 Whirlwind engine (four converted)
J-2
commercial version with Wright J-6-7 Whirlwind engine built to N2C-2 standard (two converted)

Fledgling Junior
reduced wingspan version (one built)
Fledgling Guardsman
convertible civil-military challenger powered versions.
A-3
designation assigned by the United States Army Air Corp USAAC for use of the Fledgling as a radio-controlled target aircraft

== Operators ==
Argentina

- Argentine Army Aviation Two aircraft.

Brazil

- Brazilian Army

Canada

- Four aircraft.

Colombia

- Colombian Air Force Three aircraft.

Czechoslovakia

- One aircraft only.

Iran

- Imperial Iranian Air Force

Peru

- Peru Air Force Three aircraft delivered August 25, 1933, C/N B-2, B-26 and B-39.

Turkey

- Turkish Air Force

United States

- Curtiss Flying Service
- United States Navy
- United States Army

== Aircraft on display ==
- C/N B-40, preserved as K-263, Museu Aeroespacial in Rio de Janeiro, Brazil
- C/N B-51, preserved as NC868N, Evergreen Aviation & Space Museum in McMinnville, Oregon
- C/N B-52, preserved as N271Y, Old Rhinebeck Aerodrome in Red Hook, New York
- C/N B-109, preserved as NC656M, Eagles Mere Air Museum in Eagles Mere, Pennsylvania

== Specifications (N2C-1) ==
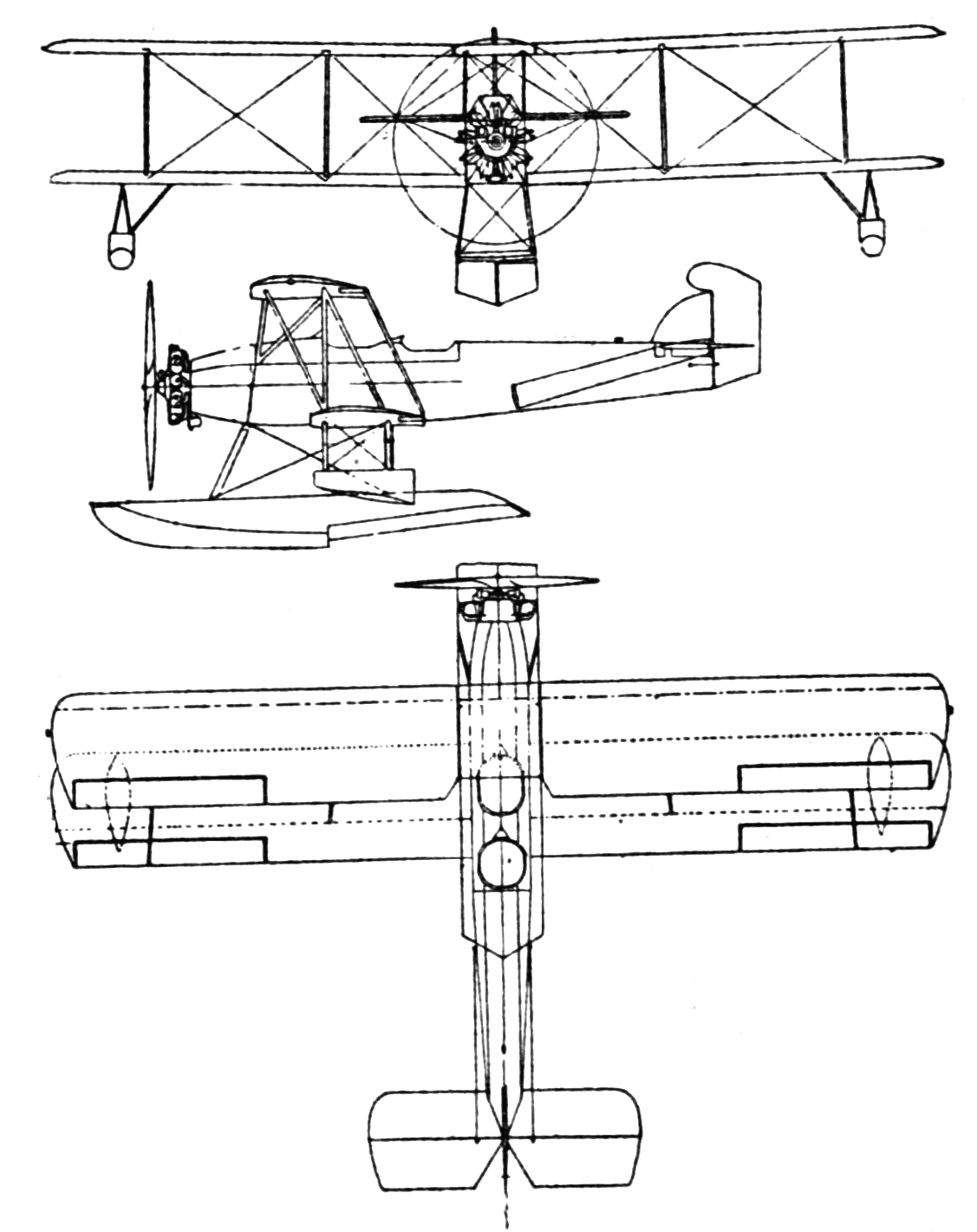
Curtiss XN2C-1 3-view drawing from Le Document aéronautique November,1928

Data from Curtiss aircraft : 1907-1947

General characteristics

- Crew: 2
- Length: 27 ft 4 in (8.33 m)
- Wingspan: 39 ft 2 in (11.93 m)
- Height: 10 ft 4 in (3.14 m)
- Wing area: 365 sq ft (33.9 m^{2})
- Airfoil: Curtiss C-72
- Empty weight: 2,135 lb (968 kg)
- Gross weight: 2,832 lb (1,285 kg)
- Powerplant: 1 × Wright J-5 9-cylinder air-cooled radial piston engine, 220 hp (160 kW)
- Propellers: 2-bladed fixed pitch propeller

Performance

- Maximum speed: 108.7 mph (174.9 km/h, 94.5 kn)
- Cruise speed: 87 mph (140 km/h, 76 kn)
- Range: 366 mi (589 km, 318 nmi)
- Service ceiling: 15,100 ft (4,600 m)
- Rate of climb: 695 ft/min (3.53 m/s)

== Bibliography ==
- Andersson, Lennart (July 1998). "Histoire de l'aéronautique persane, 1921–1941: La première aviation du Chah d'Iran" [History of the Persian Air Force, 1921–1941: The First Aircraft of the Shah of Iran]. Avions: Toute l'aéronautique et son histoire (in French) (76): 2–12. ISSN 1243-8650.
- Hagedorn, Dan (March–May 1992). "Curtiss Types in Latin America". Air Enthusiast. No. 45. pp. 61–77. ISSN 0143-5450.
