= Curtiss-Wright CW-15 =

CW-15 Sedan
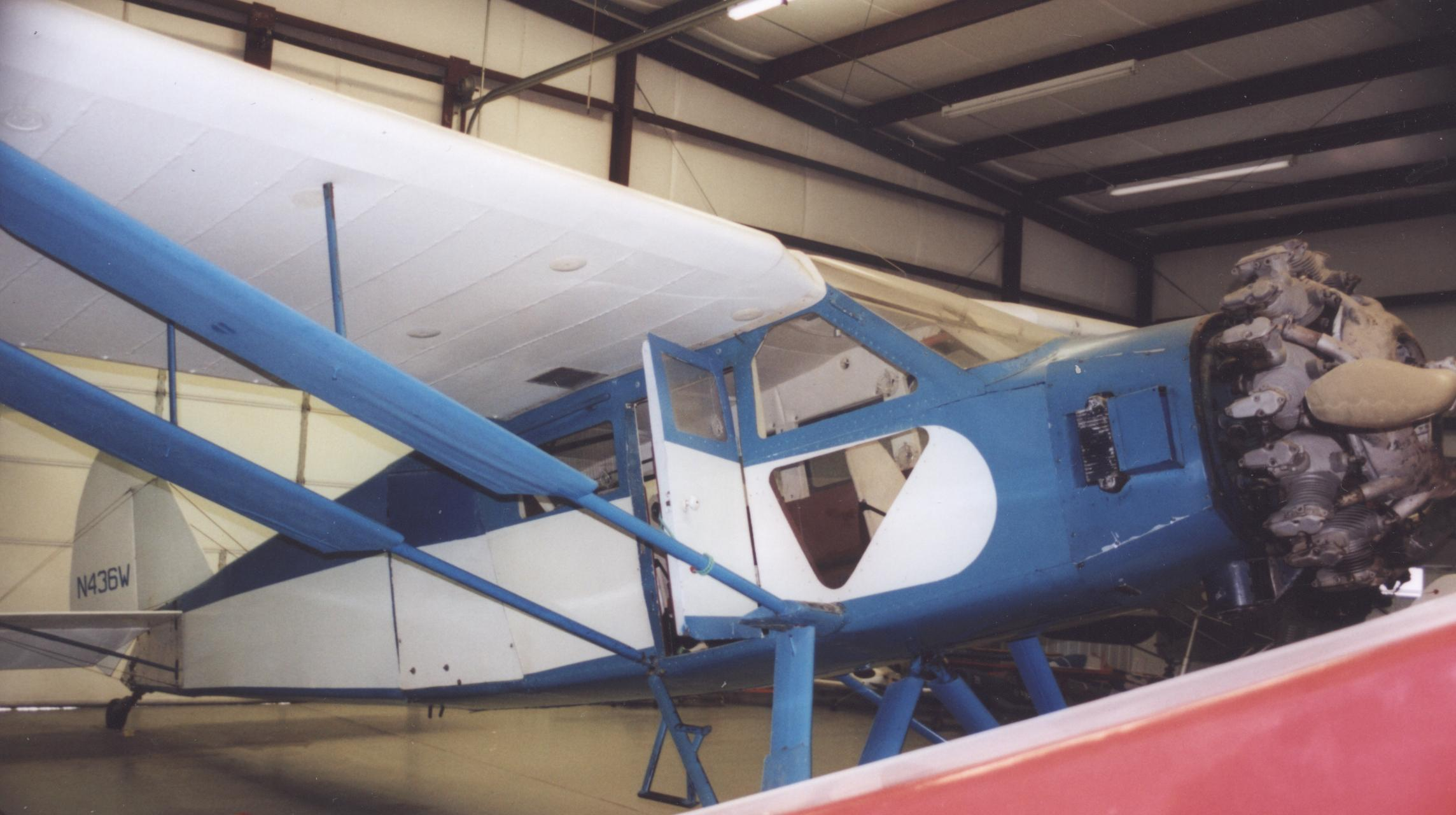
- CW-15C Sedan on display at the Historic Aircraft Restoration Museum, Dauster Field, Creve Coeur, Missouri in June 2006

General information
- Type: Civil utility aircraft
- Manufacturer: Curtiss-Wright
- Designer: Walter Burnham
- Number built: 15

History
- First flight: 1931

The Curtiss-Wright CW-15 Sedan was a four-seat utility aircraft produced in small numbers in the United States in the early 1930s. It was a braced high-wing monoplane with conventional tailwheel landing gear with a fully enclosed cabin, superficially resembling the Travel Air 10. At the time of the CW-15's design, Travel Air had recently been acquired by Curtiss-Wright.

== Operational history ==
David Sinton Ingalls used a CW-15 for travel while campaigning for Governor of Ohio.

== Variants ==
CW-15C
powered by Curtiss Challenger (nine built)
CW-15D
powered by Wright R-760 (three built)
CW-15N
powered by Kinner C-5 (three built)

== Specifications (CW-15C) ==
Data from Curtiss Aircraft 1907–1947

General characteristics

- Crew: 1
- Capacity: 3 pax
- Length: 30 ft 5 in (9.27 m)
- Wingspan: 46 ft 5 in (14.15 m)
- Height: 8 ft 10 in (2.69 m)
- Wing area: 240 sq ft (22 m^{2})
- Airfoil: Göttingen 593
- Empty weight: 2,083 lb (945 kg)
- Gross weight: 3,281 lb (1,488 kg)
- Powerplant: 1 × Curtiss R-600 Challenger 6-cylinder air-cooled radial piston engine, 185 hp (138 kW)
- Propellers: 2-bladed fixed-pitch metal propeller

Performance

- Maximum speed: 115 mph (185 km/h, 100 kn)
- Cruise speed: 97 mph (156 km/h, 84 kn)
- Range: 525 mi (845 km, 456 nmi)
- Service ceiling: 12,000 ft (3,700 m)
- Rate of climb: 600 ft/min (3.0 m/s)
