= NY-3 =

NY-3 may refer to:

- Consolidated NY-3, an aircraft
- New York's 3rd congressional district
- New York State Route 3
