= NY-1 =

NY-1 or NY 1 may refer to:

- NY1, a local 24-hour cable news television channel
- Consolidated NY-1, an aircraft
- New York's 1st congressional district
- U.S. Route 1 in New York
- New York State Route 1 (1924–1927), a previous designation for the portion of U.S. Route 1 in New York
