= Naval Aircraft Factory N3N =

1935 trainer aircraft family by the Naval Aircraft Factory

N3N
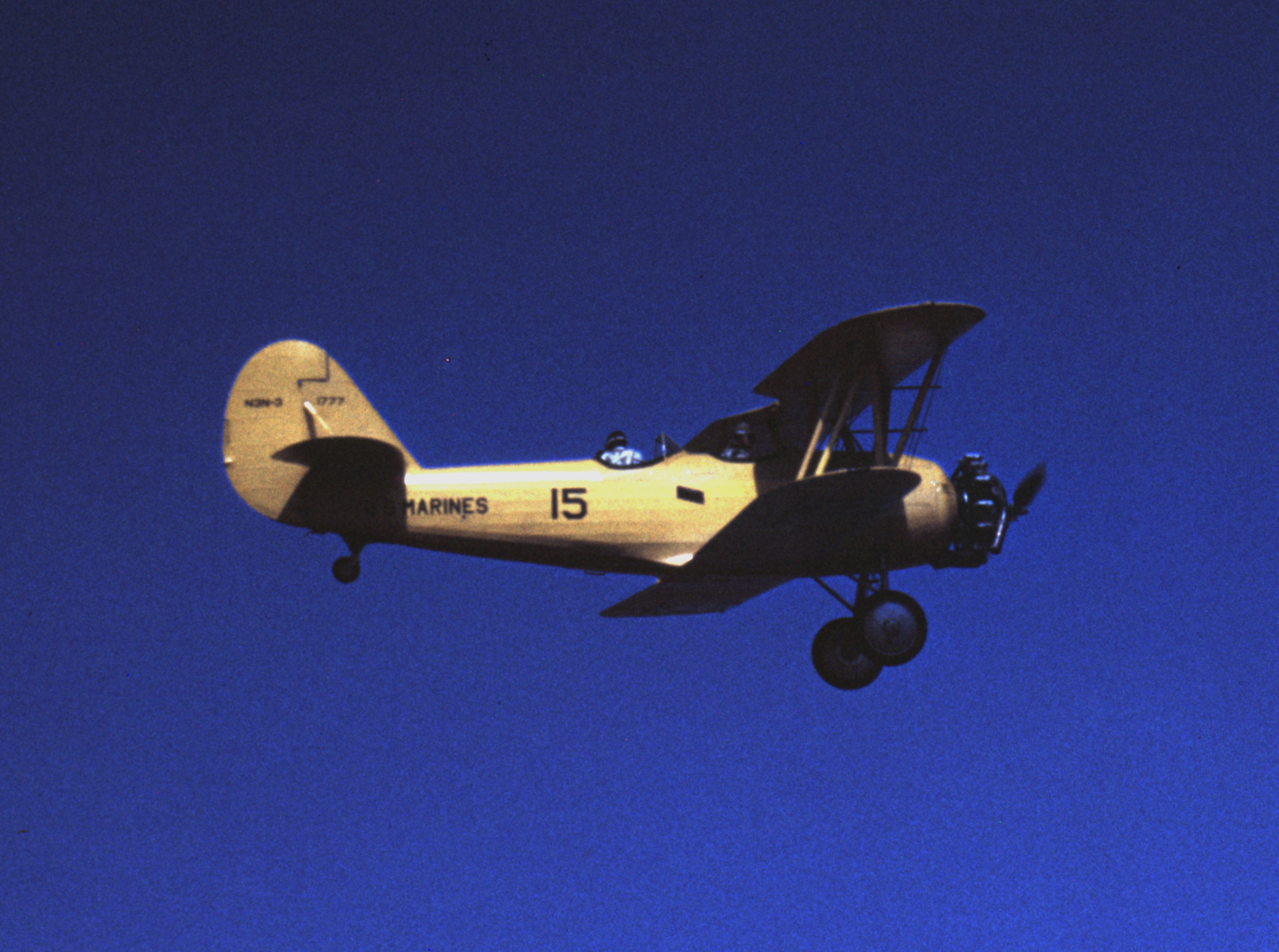
- US Marine Corps N3N-3 over Parris Island, 1942

General information
- Type: Training aircraft
- National origin: United States
- Manufacturer: Naval Aircraft Factory
- Primary user: United States Navy
- Number built: 997

History
- Manufactured: 1935-1942
- Introduction date: 1936
- First flight: August 1935
- Retired: 1961

The Naval Aircraft Factory N3N is an American tandem-seat, open cockpit, primary training biplane aircraft built by the Naval Aircraft Factory (NAF) in Philadelphia, Pennsylvania, during the 1930s and early 1940s.

== Development and design ==
Built to replace the Consolidated NY-2 and NY-3, the N3N was successfully tested as both a conventional airplane and a seaplane. The seaplane used a single large float under the fuselage and two smaller floats under the outer tips of the lower wings. The conventional airplane used a fixed landing gear. The prototype XN3N-1 was powered by a Wright J-5 radial engine. An order for 179 production aircraft was received. Near the end of the first production run the engine was replaced with the Wright R-760-2 Whirlwind radial. The aircraft is constructed using Alcoa's extruded aluminum, with bolts and rivets, rather than the more common welded steel tubing fuselages. Early production models used aluminum stringers formed for cancelled airship construction orders.

== Operational history ==
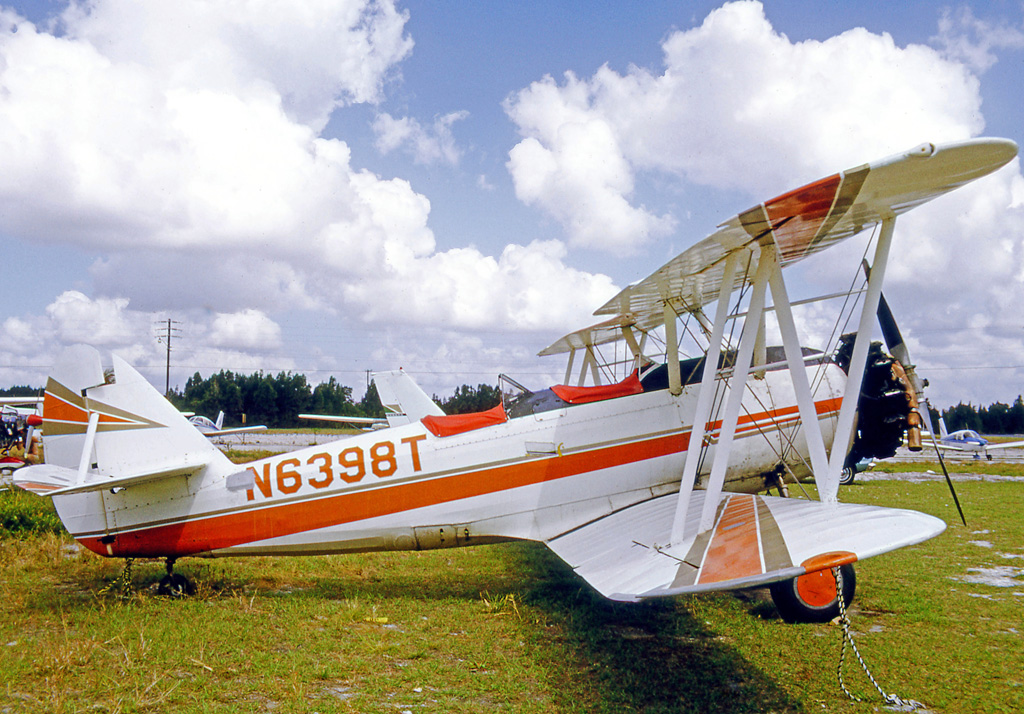
NAF N3N-3 flown privately in Florida in 1972

The N.A.F. built 997 N3N aircraft beginning in 1935. They included 179 N3N-1s and 816 N3N-3s, plus their prototypes. Production ended in 1942, but the type remained in use through the rest of World War II. The N3N was the last biplane in US military service - the last (used by the U.S. Naval Academy for aviation familiarization) were retired in 1959. The N3N was also unique in that it was an aircraft designed and manufactured by an aviation firm wholly owned and operated by the U.S. government (the Navy, in this case) as opposed to private industry. For this purpose, the U.S. Navy bought the rights and the tooling for the Wright R-760 series engine and produced their own engines. These Navy-built engines were installed on Navy-built airframes.

According to Trimble, "The N3N-3, sometimes known as the Yellow Bird for its distinctive, high-visibility paint scheme, or less kindly, Yellow Peril for the jeopardy in which student aviators often found themselves, showed itself to be rugged, reliable, and generally forgiving to student pilots."

Four N3N-3s were delivered to the United States Coast Guard in 1941.

Postwar, many surviving aircraft were sold on the US civil aircraft market and bought for operation by agricultural aerial spraying firms and private pilot owners. According to Robinet, "The front cockpit had been replaced with a huge metal hopper that loaded from the top and discharged dust from the bottom through a simple venturi type spreader. The airplane was originally powered by a 235 h.p. Wright Radial engine but for their purposes, these were replaced by 450 h.p. Pratt & Whitney radial engines. The engine, wheels and instruments were obtained from the Army BT-13 which was purchased for less than $350.00 each."

A number are still (as of 2014) active in the USA.

== Variants ==
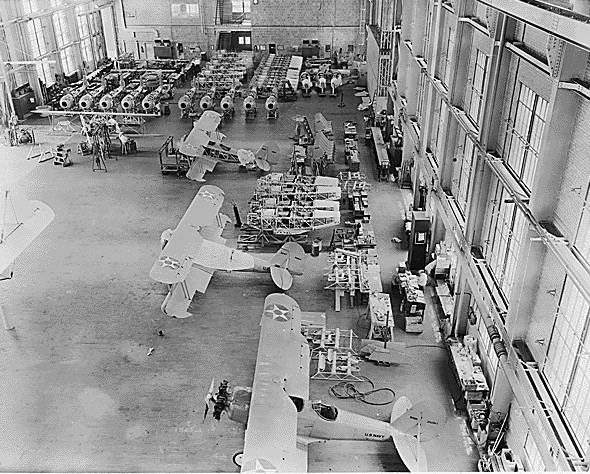
N3N production in 1937

XN3N-1
First prototype aircraft, Bureau of Aeronautics number 9991.
N3N-1
Two-seat primary trainer biplane, powered by a 220 hp (160 kW) Wright R-790 Whirlwind (J-5) radial piston engine. 179 were built.
XN3N-2
One prototype only (Bureau number 0265) powered by a 240 hp (180 kW) Wright R-760-96 Whirlwind (J-6-7) radial piston engine.
XN3N-3
One production N3N-1 (0020) converted into a 'dash three' prototype.
N3N-3
Two-seat primary trainer biplane, powered by a 235 hp (175 kW) Wright R-760-2 Whirlwind (J-6-7) radial piston engine. 816 built.

== Operators ==
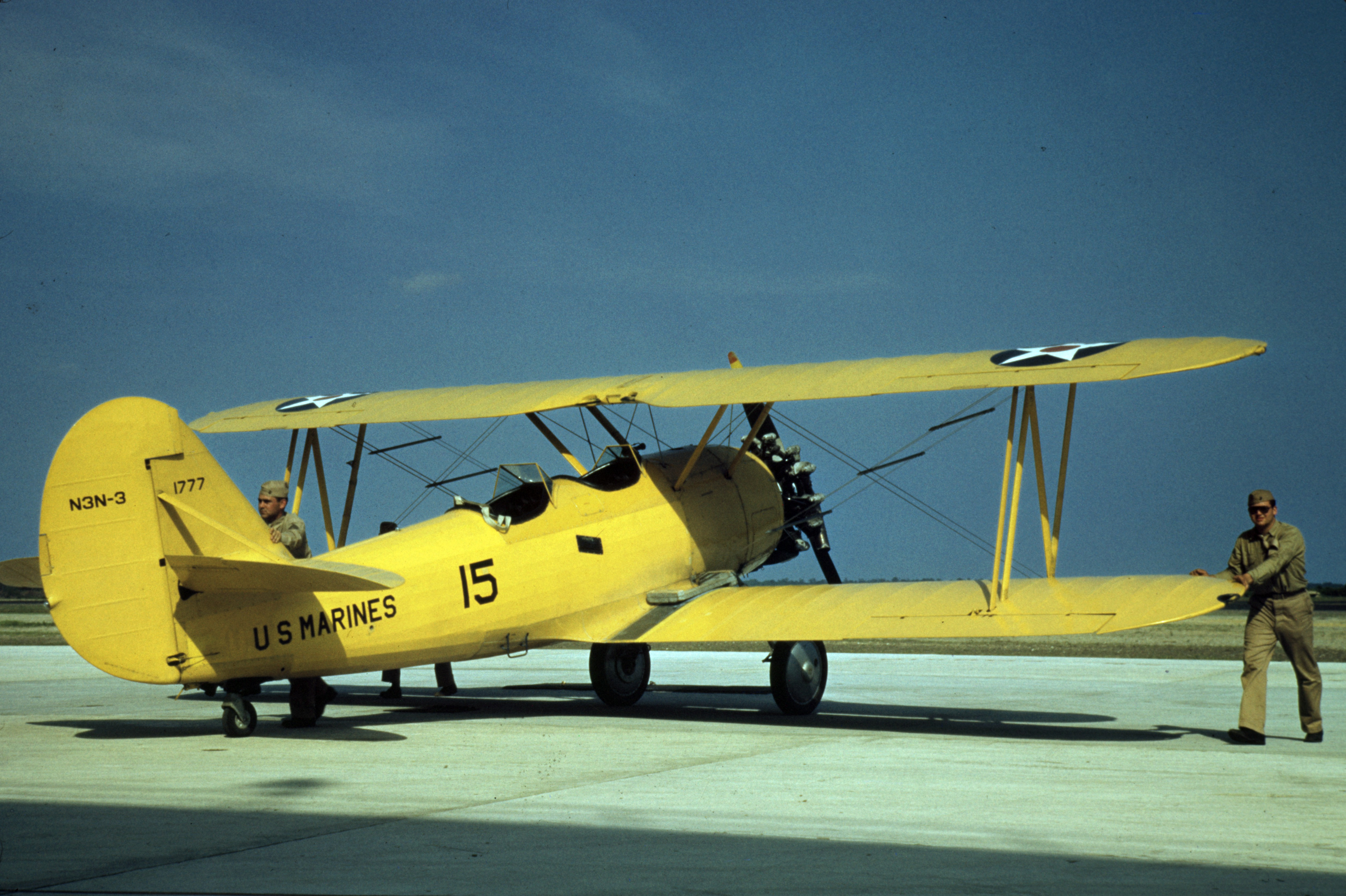
US Marine Corps N3N-3, 1942.

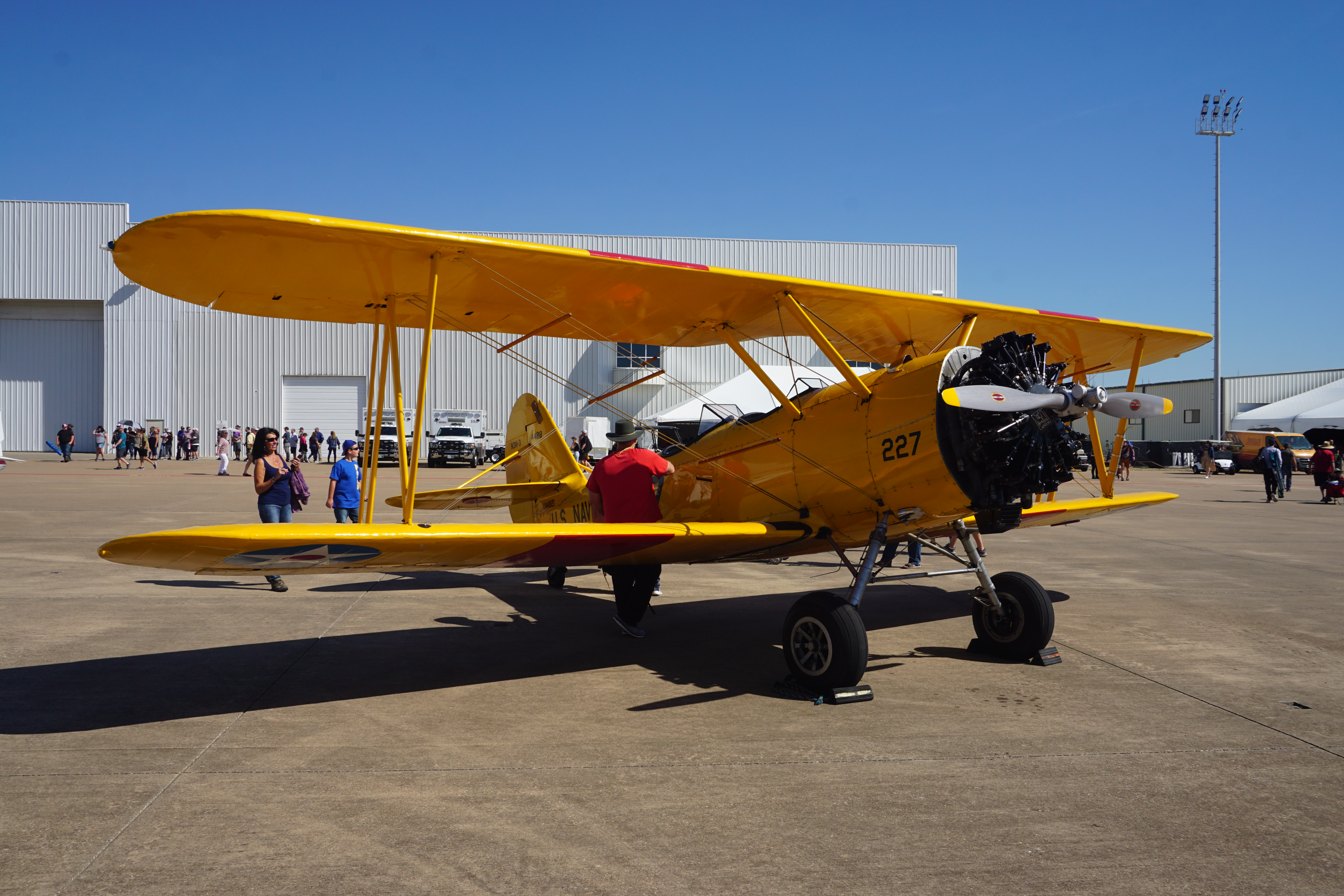
An N3N at the 2019 Fort Worth Alliance Air Show

United States

- United States Coast Guard
- U.S. Marines
- United States Navy
- Chilean Naval Airforce 4 N3N-1 received by Lend-Lease Program
- Cuban Naval Airforce 5 N3N-1s received by Lend-Lease Program.

== Surviving aircraft ==
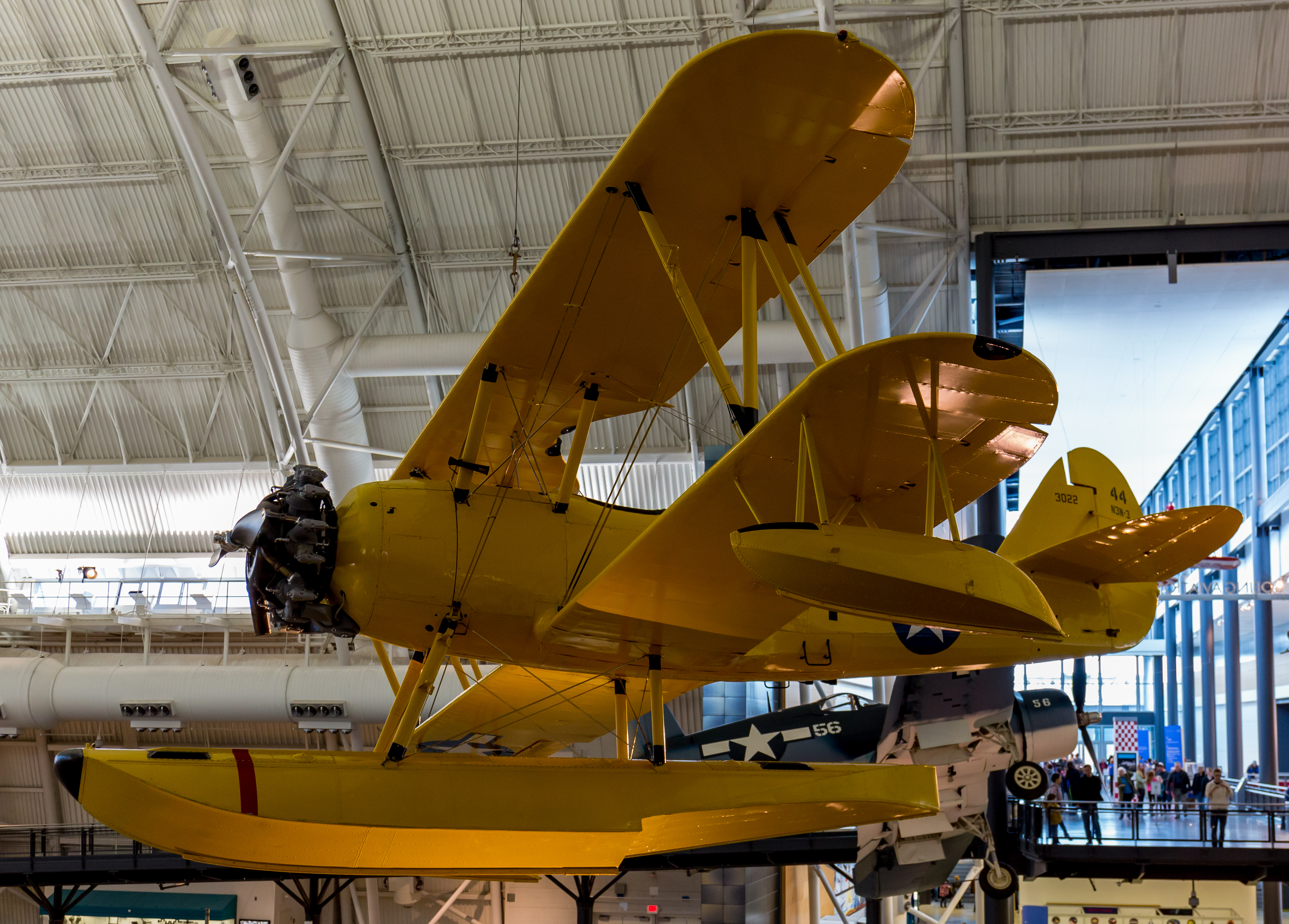
An N3N-3 seaplane on display at the Steven F. Udvar-Hazy Center.

- 0719 – On display at the Museo Nacional Aeronáutico y del Espacio in Santiago.
- 1918 – On display at the Warhawk Air Museum in Nampa, Idaho.
- 1920 - Airworthy & privately owned by retired Navy Pilot located at 2W6 close to NAS Patuxent River Patuxent River, Maryland.
- 1991 - Airworthy, owned and operated by a private owner. Located on Long Island, NY.
- 1996--On display at Chattahoochee Technical College Aviation Training Academy, Paulding County Airport, GA.
- 2582 – On display at the Western Antique Aeroplane & Automobile Museum in Hood River, Oregon.
- 2621 – On display at the Yanks Air Museum in Chino, California.
- 2693 – On display at the National Museum of Naval Aviation in Pensacola, Florida.
- 2733 – Airworthy with the High Sierra Squadron of the Commemorative Air Force in Reno, Nevada.
- 2781 - Airworthy with the Houston Wing of the Commemorative Air Force in Houston, Texas
- 2782 – On display at the Mid-Atlantic Air Museum in Reading, Pennsylvania.
- 2827 – On display at the Yanks Air Museum in Chino, California.
- 2831 – On display at the Evergreen Aviation and Space Museum in McMinnville, Oregon.
- 2892 – On display at the Military Aviation Museum in Virginia Beach, Virginia.
- 2951 – On display at the Kalamazoo Aviation History Museum in Kalamazoo, Michigan.
- 2959 – On display at the USS Lexington Museum in Corpus Christi, Texas.
- 3022 – On display at the National Air and Space Museum's Udvar Hazy Center in Chantilly, Virginia.
- 3033 – Airworthy with Ag Air Squadron Three, LLC in Grant Park, Illinois.
- 3046 – On display at the National Museum of Naval Aviation in Pensacola, Florida.
- 4383 - Airworthy, Owned and Operated by the City of Foley, Alabama as part of their WWII Heritage City commemoration initiatives.
- 4402 - Airworthy with Joe McBryan (Buffalo Airways) in Yellowknife, Northwest Territories.
- 4406 – Airworthy with Birnie Air Services in Sandown, Isle of Wight.
- 4480 – On display at the Yanks Air Museum in Chino, California.
- 4497 – On display at the Pima Air & Space Museum in Tucson, Arizona.

== Specifications (N3N-3) ==
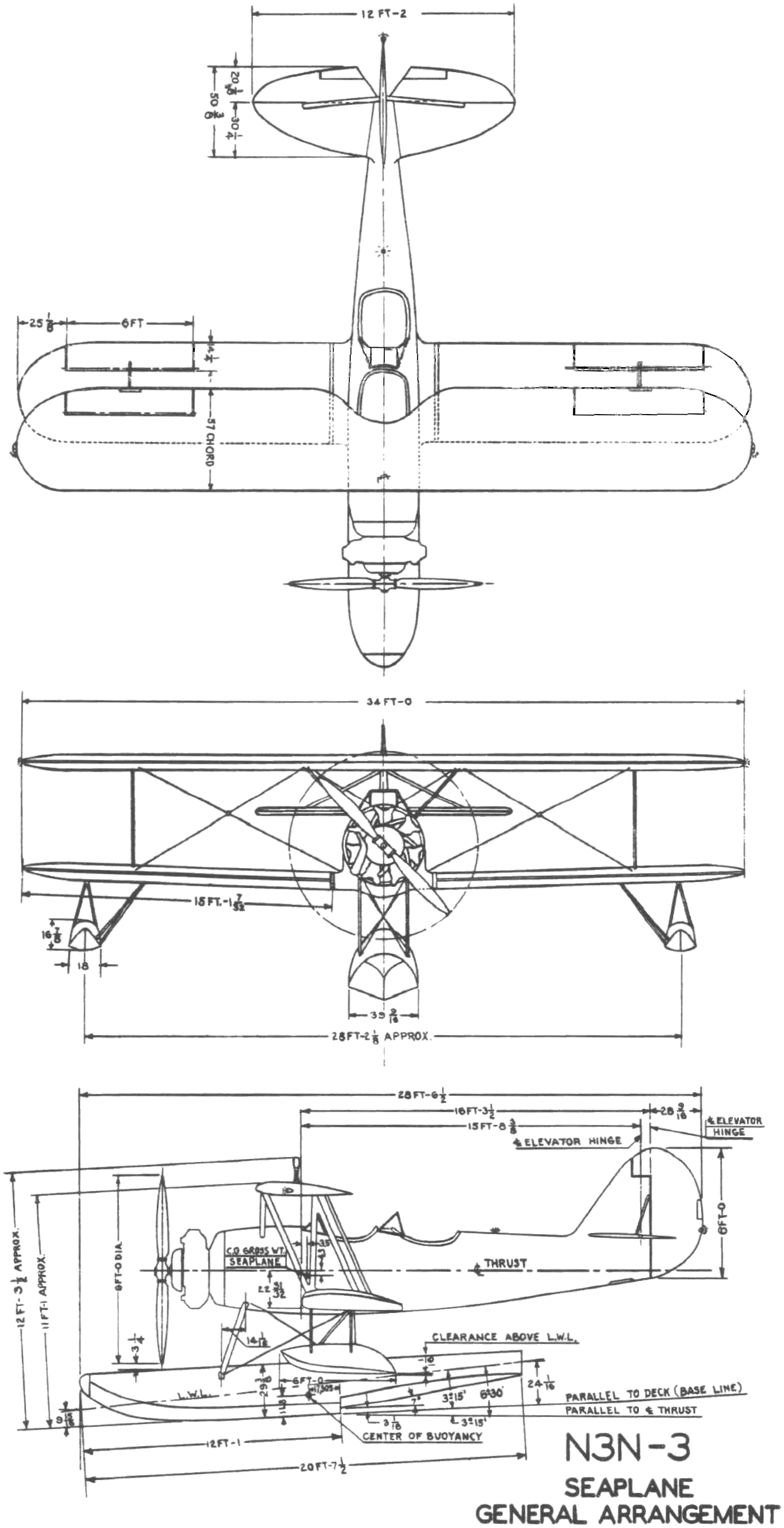
3-view line drawing of the Naval Aircraft Factory N3N-3

Data from Holmes, 2005. p. 96.

General characteristics

- Crew: 2
- Length: 25 ft 6 in (7.77 m)
- Wingspan: 34 ft 0 in (10.36 m)
- Height: 10 ft 10 in (3.3 m)
- Wing area: 305 sq ft (28.3 m^{2})
- Empty weight: 2,090 lb (948 kg)
- Gross weight: 2,792 lb (1,266 kg)
- Powerplant: 1 × Wright R-760-2 Whirlwind radial , 235 hp (175 kW)

Performance

- Maximum speed: 126 mph (203 km/h, 109 kn)
- Range: 470 mi (756 km, 410 nmi)
- Service ceiling: 15,200 ft (4,635 m)
- Rate of climb: 900 ft/min (4.6 m/s)

Communications were done by the instructor through a speaking tube to the student in the front cockpit. Communications back were agreed-upon gestures.

== See also ==
Aircraft of comparable role, configuration, and era

- Avro Cadet
- Avro Tutor
- Boeing-Stearman Kaydet
- Breda Ba.25
- Focke-Wulf Fw 44
- Polikarpov U-2
- Yokosuka K5Y
