= Institute of Corporate Responsibility and Sustainability =

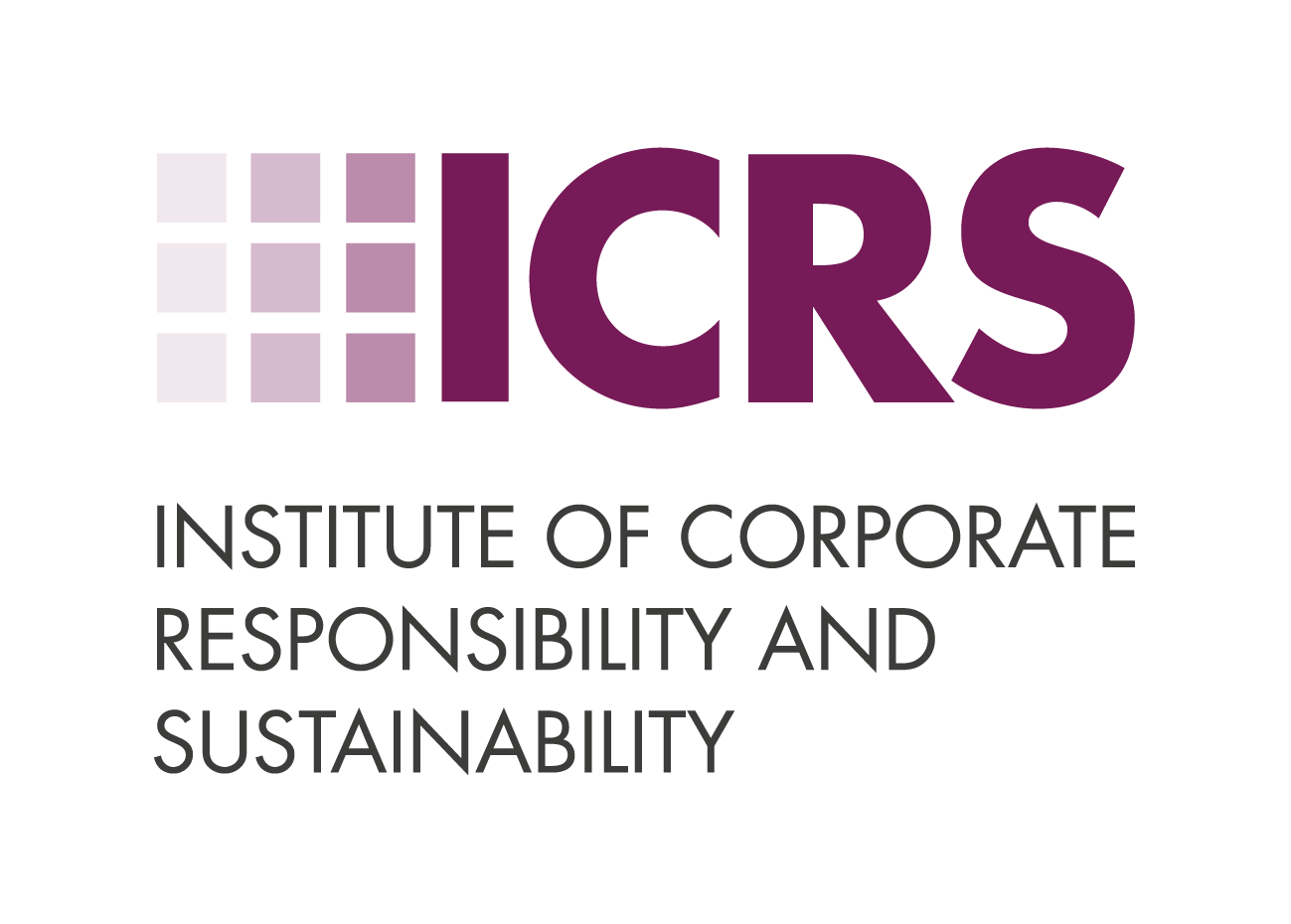
- Predecessor: Corporate Responsibility Group
- Founded: 2014
- Type: Professional Body
- Purpose: Corporate Responsibility, Sustainability
- Location: London, United Kingdom
- Region served: Worldwide
- Website: http://www.icrs.info

The Institute of Corporate Responsibility and Sustainability (ICRS) is a professional body dedicated to supporting Corporate Responsibility and Sustainability practitioners. It is the successor to the Corporate Responsibility Group.

ICRS was launched on 9 July 2014 at Guildhall in London, with speeches by the Lord Mayor of London, Fiona Woolf; the Minister for Civil Society, Hon. Nick Hurd MP; and the Chief Executive of Business in the Community.

The City of London Corporation is the "lead supporter" of ICRS. Other founding supporters include global firms such as Alliance Boots, Herbert Smith Freehills, Hogan Lovells, IBM, Linklaters, Marks & Spencer, Pearson, Santander, Tata Consultancy Services, Thomson Reuters and Zurich Insurance Group.

== Membership ==
Membership to ICRS is available to all Corporate Responsibility and Sustainability practitioners at all stages in their career. Eligibility for Associate, Member and Fellow level membership is assessed against the elements of the institute's competency framework, by an ICRS Member. Affiliate membership is not assessed.

Membership benefits include:

- formal recognition as an Associate/Member/Fellow of the Institute
- continuing professional development
- access to webinars and events
- access to online resources, including those from Ashridge Business School
- mentoring opportunities

Associates, Members and Fellows are required to undertake continuing professional development (CPD).

=== Post-nominal letter entitlement ===
The use of post-nominal letters are permitted for the following membership levels:

- Associate: AICRS
- Member: MICRS
- Fellow: FICRS

== Vision, mission, role ==
- Vision: A world where all businesses act responsibly and sustainably to have a positive impact on society and safeguard the future of our planet.
- Mission: To be the leading organisation for corporate responsibility and sustainability practitioners by supporting them to be brilliant in their work.
- Role: To help CR and sustainability professionals to be brilliant in their work. ICRS does this by setting professional standards, recognising achievements, and providing or directing members towards practical support and advice.
