= Fairchild 45 =

1935 utility aircraft

Model 45
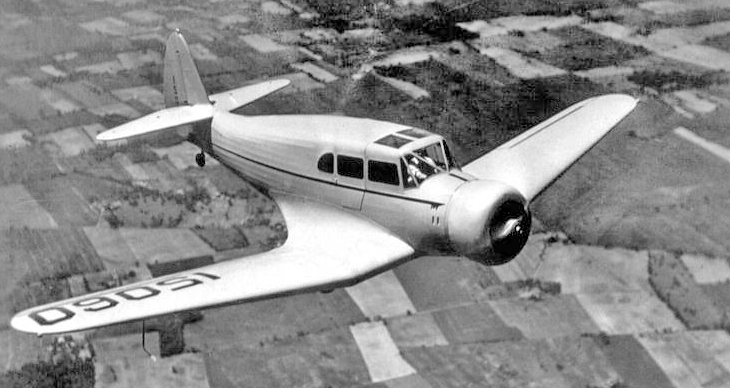

General information
- Type: Five-seat cabin monoplane
- Manufacturer: Fairchild Aircraft
- Primary users: United States Army Air Forces United States Navy
- Number built: 17

History
- First flight: 31 May 1935

The Fairchild Model 45 was a 1930s American five-seat cabin monoplane aircraft designed and built by Fairchild.

== Development ==
During 1934 the Fairchild company designed a business or executive aircraft with five seats, designated the Model 45. It first flew on 31 May 1935. The Model 45 was a low-wing cantilever monoplane with a conventional cantilever tail unit and a retractable tailwheel landing gear. The aircraft was powered by a 225 hp (168 kW) Jacobs L-4 radial engine and had a luxury five-seat interior as standard. Flight testing showed that the aircraft performed well, although it was described as sedate.

The company predicted that the Model 45 would have only limited market appeal in that form, therefore only the prototype was built.

Fairchild then upgraded the prototype with a larger engine, the Wright R-760 radial, for evaluation. In this configuration it was designated the Model 45-A. This configuration was placed in production, with about 16 units being completed.

== Operational history ==
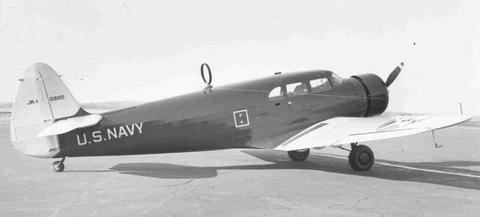
The Fairchild JK-1

One aircraft was bought as an executive transport by the United States Navy as the JK-1. After the United States entered the Second World War, two aircraft were impressed into service with the United States Army Air Forces as the UC-88.

In 1997, Greg Herrick requested drawings of a Fairchild 45 tail section for an ongoing restoration project. The request was refused by Fairchild, citing the design was a trade secret. This led to a FOIA request, and lawsuit that was debated in the United States Supreme Court. The effort led to the "Herrick amendment" added to the FAA Air Transportation Modernization and Safety Improvement Act of 2012. The amendment released the ATC type certificate information for 1,257 aircraft first certified in 1927 through the beginning of World War II in 1939.

== Variants ==
45
One prototype powered by a 225 hp (168 kW) Jacobs L-4 radial engine.
45-A
Production aircraft powered by a 320 hp (239 kW) Wright R-760 radial engine, 16 built.
JK-1
One 45-A for the United States Navy.
UC-88
Two 45-As impressed into service with the United States Army Air Forces.

== Operators ==
USA

- United States Army Air Forces
- United States Navy

== Specifications (45-A) ==
Data from Illustrated Encyclopedia of Aircraft 1985

General characteristics

- Crew: one
- Capacity: four passengers
- Length: 30 ft 1 in (9.17 m)
- Wingspan: 39 ft 6 in (12.04 m)
- Height: 8 ft 2 in (2.49 m)
- Wing area: 248 sq ft (23.04 m^{2})
- Empty weight: 2,512 lb (1,139 kg)
- Gross weight: 4,000 lb (1,814 kg)
- Powerplant: 1 × Wright R-760-E2 7-cylinder radial piston engine , 320 hp (239 kW)

Performance

- Maximum speed: 170 mph (274 km/h, 150 kn)
- Range: 650 mi (1,046 km, 560 nmi)
- Service ceiling: 18,700 ft (5,700 m)

== See also ==
Related lists

- List of military aircraft of the United States
- List of United States Navy aircraft designations (pre-1962)
