= Hodkinson HT-1 =

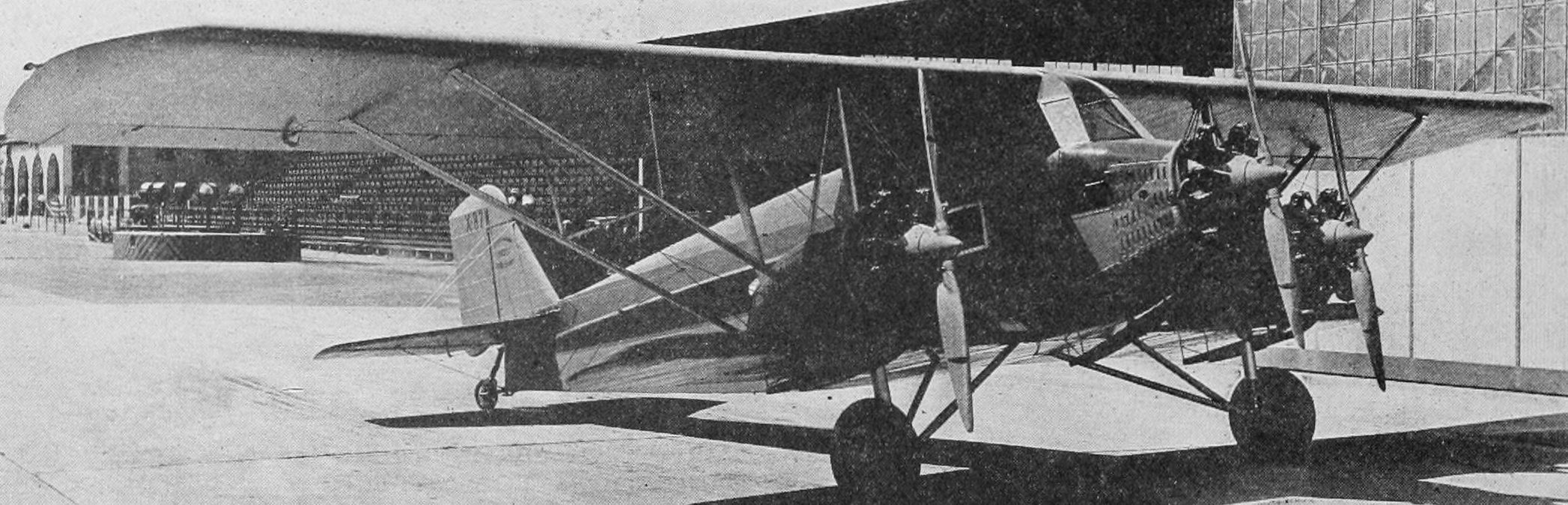

General information
- Type: Six or seven passenger transport
- National origin: U.S.
- Manufacturer: Valley Manufacturing Co., a division of Hodkinson Aircraft
- Designer: Don R. Berlin
- Number built: 1

History
- First flight: 17 July 1929

The Hodkinson HT-1 was a U.S., eight place, three-engined sesquiplane, first flown in 1929. Despite an order for five, only one had been completed before Hodkinson Aircraft went bankrupt near the start of the Great Depression. It operated in Guatemala for several years.

== Design and development ==
Hodkinson Aircraft was founded in 1929 by William Wadsworth Hodkinson, one of the pioneers of the film industry who in 1916 had organized Paramount Pictures. He later went into film distribution, founding the W.W.Hodkinson Co. and then moved into the aviation business. The HT-1 was built by Valley Manufacturing Co. a division of Hodkinson Aircraft based in Glendale, California. Its designer, Don R. Berlin, later designed the Curtiss P-40.

The wings of the HT-1 were both built around spruce spars and had rectangular plans out to rounded tips. The upper wing, with three-quarters of the total wing area, provided most of the lift and mounted narrow chord, Friese ailerons that reached from wingtips to above the outer engines. The short, lower wings were braced to the upper ones with parallel interplane struts between the wing spars.

The HT-1 was powered by three 170 hp (130 kW) Curtiss Challenger radial engines, one in the nose and the others on top of the lower wing, braced by vertical struts to the upper spars. Behind the central engine the fuselage was flat sided, with the wing centre-section fixed to it by inverted V cabane struts faired into the fuselage's chrome-molybdenum tube structure. These provided a clear rear view from the pilots' cabin under the leading edge of the wing. Pilot and co-pilot sat side-by-side with dual controls, though the co-pilot's controls could be removed to allow an extra passenger to be carried. Their cabin was normally accessed through doors on either side but there was also a door in the rear which led down to the passengers' windowed, six seat cabin. There was a toilet at the back and also a baggage compartment, though this was only accessible from outside. Cabin access was via doors on either side, opening just ahead of the rear seats.

Its tail was conventional, The fixed surfaces, like the fuselage, had chrome-molybdenum tube structures and the tailplane was mounted on top of the fuselage. The fin was braced to the tailplane and had a cropped, roughly triangular profile. The balanced rudder had a blunted rectangular profile.

The HT-1 had fixed, wide track, conventional (16 ft 6 in (5.03 m)), landing gear. Its mainwheels, fitted with brakes, were on axles and drag struts from the lower fuselage longerons which placed them below the outer engines. Vertical shock absorber legs joined the lower wing engine mountings. There was a tailwheel at the rear.

== Operational history ==
The HT-1 first flew on 17 July 1929. It was publicized at the Cleveland Aero Show in September 1929 and entered into the Cleveland based 1929 National Air Races. It won a contract for five examples from a Guatemalan airline, Companía Nacional de Aviación, which Hodkinson had founded but Hodkinson Aircraft were in financial difficulties in 1930 as the depression deepened. Though the company ceased trading in 1930, the prototype went to Guatemala and remained in use there for several years.

== Specifications ==
Data from Aero Digest (November 1929)

General characteristics

- Crew: two or one
- Capacity: six or seven passengers
- Length: 36 ft 3 in (11.05 m)
- Upper wingspan: 56 ft (17 m)
- Lower wingspan: 30 ft 6 in (9.30 m)
- Height: 11 ft 10 in (3.61 m)
- Wing area: 430 sq ft (40 m^{2}) upper wing, 139 sq ft (12.9 m^{2})
- Empty weight: 4,300 lb (1,950 kg)
- Gross weight: 6,950 lb (3,152 kg) * Payload: 1,560 lb (710 kg)
- Fuel capacity: 160 US gal (130 imp gal; 610 L) total in two upper wing tanks
- Powerplant: 3 × Curtiss Challenger six cylinder, double row radial, 170 hp (130 kW) each
- Propellers: 2-bladed Hamilton Standard

Performance

- Maximum speed: 115 mph (185 km/h, 100 kn)
- Cruise speed: 100 mph (160 km/h, 87 kn)
- Landing speed: 50 mph (80 km/h; 43 kn)
- Range: 500 mi (800 km, 430 nmi)
- Service ceiling: 13,400 ft (4,100 m)
- Rate of climb: 860 ft/min (4.4 m/s) at sealevel
