= Steve Down =

American entrepreneur

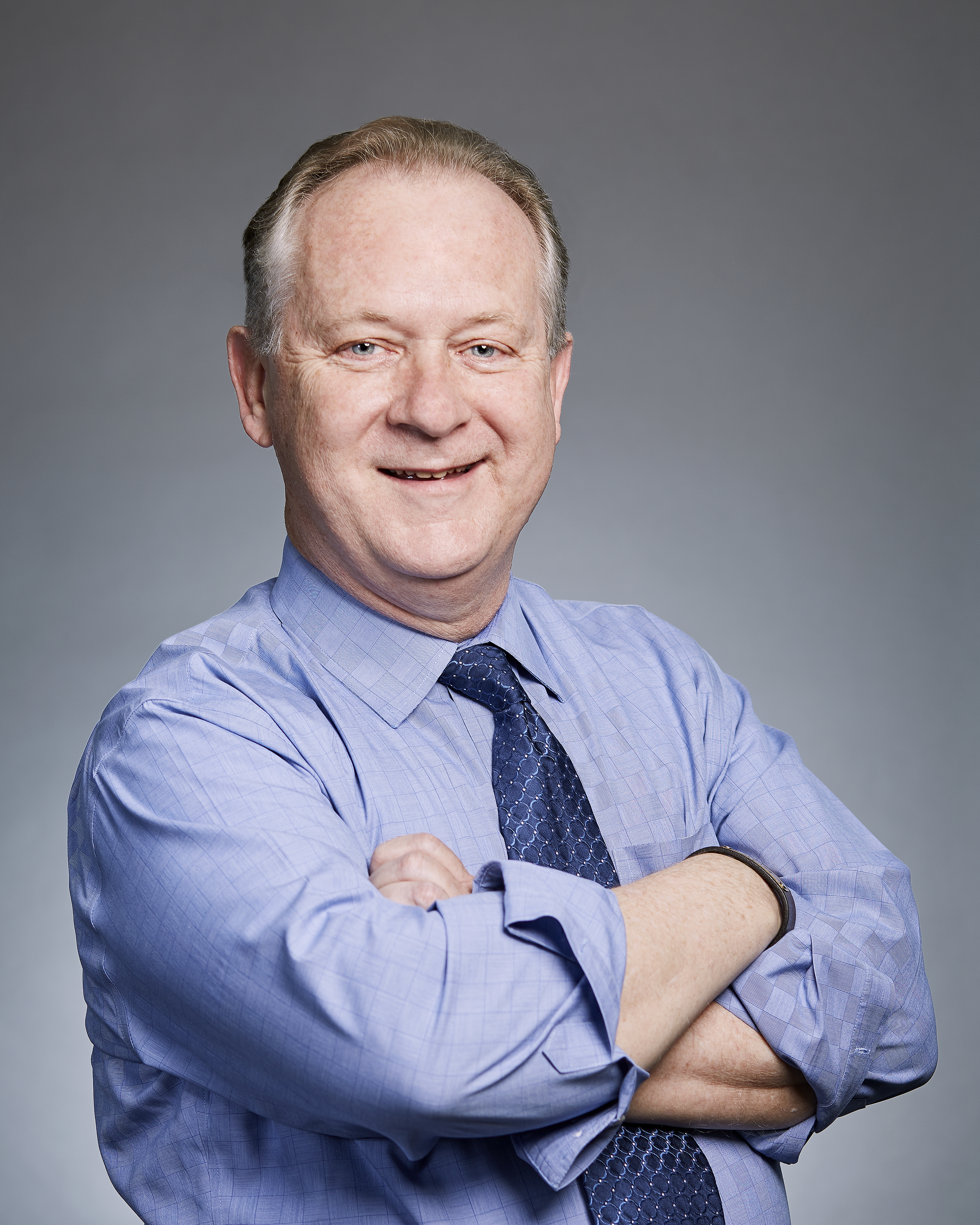
- Steve Down
- Occupation: Entrepreneur
- Organization(s): Falls Event Center, Even Stevens, Financially Fit
- Website: SteveDown.com

Steve Down is a Utah-based entrepreneur and business owner. He is best known as the founder of Even Stevens sandwich shops, Investors Dynamic Corporation (IDC), and The Falls Event Center, a chain of event centers in five western US states. In the 1990s a court order closed IDC. As of 2018, The Falls Events Centers were under investigation by the Securities and Exchange Commission and investors have characterized the company as fraudulent in a 2018 lawsuit.

== Background ==
In 2018 his sandwich store Even Stevens closed a number of stores, and The Falls Event Centers has filed for bankruptcy. In September 2018 Down was under criminal investigation by the FBI for financial fraud activities.

=== Investors Dynamics Corporation ===
In 1996, Down and his company Investors Dynamics Corporation (IDC) were subject to litigation by the SEC regarding allegations of operating a multi-level marketing pyramid scheme from October 1994 through March 1996 and promising "exaggerated returns". In 1998, final judgement was made and the defendants consented to court orders without confirming or denying allegations. The court ordered permanent injunction against Down and IDC and barred him from "association with any broker, broker-dealer, investment company, investment adviser or municipal securities dealer" for two years. The court waived disgorgement and determined not to impose civil penalties based on the demonstrated inability of the defendants to pay. An administrative proceeding was later filed following the final judgement.

== The Falls Event Center ==
Down founded The Falls Event Center in April 2011, which provides event spaces for small events; the company purchased a portion of the Evergreen Aviation & Space Museum campus and assets out of bankruptcy in 2016. In 2017 Down and The Falls Event Center were under SEC investigation and several of the company's centers were in financial straits. As of 2018 The Falls Event Center had locations in 5 states. In the 2018 lawsuit, investors into the Falls Event Centers allege Down promoted monthly returns approaching 35% and furthermore claim "Down constantly misrepresented the state of the centers and their potential."

The Wings & Waves Waterpark is an operating waterpark in McMinnville, Oregon, acquired as a portion of the Falls Event Center purchase of Evergreen Aviation and Space Museum’s assets to use for his McMinnville Falls Event Center. After the Falls Event Center succumbed to investor lawsuits and bankruptcy, the Wings & Waves Waterpark was purchased out of bankruptcy by Oregon vintner, Bill Stoller.

In 2018, The Falls Event Center & Steve Down were permanently enjoined by the SEC from future violations of the Securities Act of 1933 after the SEC's complaint against The Falls Event Center and its then-CEO Steve Down for making material misrepresentations about the profitability of the company to investors. The complaint alleged that The Falls Event Center was knowingly never profitable while simultaneously representing to investors that some or all of the event centers were and continued to be profitable and that such representations were untrue. The settlement allowed Steve Down and the Falls Event Center to avoid admitting or denying the SEC's complaint.

== Other ventures ==
In 1999, Down founded a financial coaching company under the name Wealth Heart Corporation, which was later changed to Financially Fit.

Down opened the first Even Stevens restaurant in downtown Salt Lake City, Utah in 2014.

CE Karma is a professional dental continuing education organization founded by Down that operates in 33 states.
