= North American Aerospace Museum =

Aerospace museum in McMinnville, Oregon, US

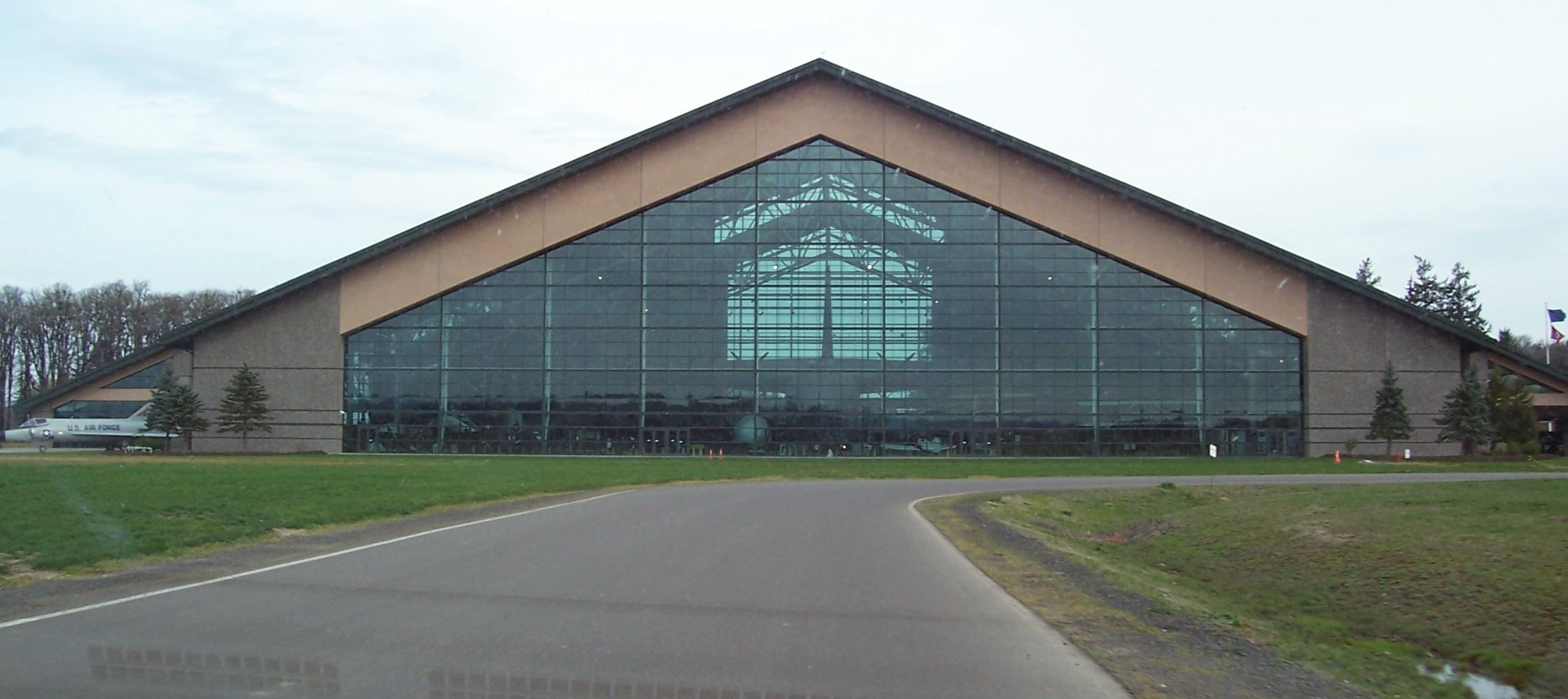
- West Pavilion
- Former name: Evergreen Aviation & Space Museum
- Established: 1991 (as the Evergreen Museum)
- Location: McMinnville, Oregon, United States
- Coordinates: 45°12′14″N 123°8′36″W
- Type: Aerospace museum
- Founders: Delford M. Smith and Michael King Smith
- Director: Brandon Roben
- Website: noramaerospace.org

The North American Aerospace Museum is an independent, 501(c)(3) non-profit, aviation museum in McMinnville, Oregon. Its exhibits include the Hughes H-4 Hercules (Spruce Goose) and more than 150 military and civilian aircraft, unmanned aerial vehicles (drones), and spacecraft. The museum complex includes three main buildings: the original aviation exhibit hall (formerly called West Pavilion, now called Hercules Pavilion), a large screen digital theater, and a second exhibit hall (formerly called East Pavilion, now called Titan Pavilion).

The museum is located across Oregon Route 18 from the McMinnville Municipal Airport (KMMV).

== History ==
First envisioned by Michael King Smith, a former captain in the United States Air Force and son of Evergreen International Aviation founder Delford M. Smith, the Evergreen Museum opened in 1991 with a small collection of vintage aircraft in a hangar at company headquarters.

In March 1990, The Walt Disney Company announced that it would close the Long Beach, California, exhibit of the Spruce Goose. The Aeroclub of Southern California began looking for a new home for the historic aircraft. In 1992, the Evergreen Museum won the bid with a proposal to build a museum around the aircraft and feature it as a central exhibit.

The disassembly of the aircraft began in August 1992. The parts were sent by ship up the Pacific Ocean, Columbia River, and Willamette River to Dayton where it was transferred to trucks and driven to Evergreen International Aviation. It arrived in February 1993. For the next eight years, the plane went through detailed restoration. Volunteers removed all the paint, replaced worn parts, and repainted the entire aircraft, among many other tasks. In September 2000, the main aircraft assemblies were complete. The fuselage, wings, and tail were transported across the highway and into the new museum building, still under construction. Over the next year, crews assembled the wings and tail to the fuselage. These were completed in time for the museum's opening on June 6, 2001. The control surfaces (flaps, ailerons, rudder, and elevators) were assembled later. The last piece was put into place on December 7, 2001.

The name of the museum has evolved. Initially known as the Evergreen Museum, it changed in 1994 to the Evergreen AirVenture Museum. In 1997, the facility was renamed the Captain Michael King Smith Evergreen Aviation Educational Center in memory of Smith, who died in an automobile accident in March 1995.

In September 2006, work began on the space museum building, a twin to the aviation museum. By this time, the museum had acquired several space-related items, and the original building was running out of room. The new building was completed in May 2008 and had its grand opening on June 6, 2008, exactly seven years after the aviation museum opened. In 2009, the museum became an affiliate in the Smithsonian Affiliations program.

Attempts to obtain a retired Space Shuttle were unsuccessful.

=== Financial difficulties ===
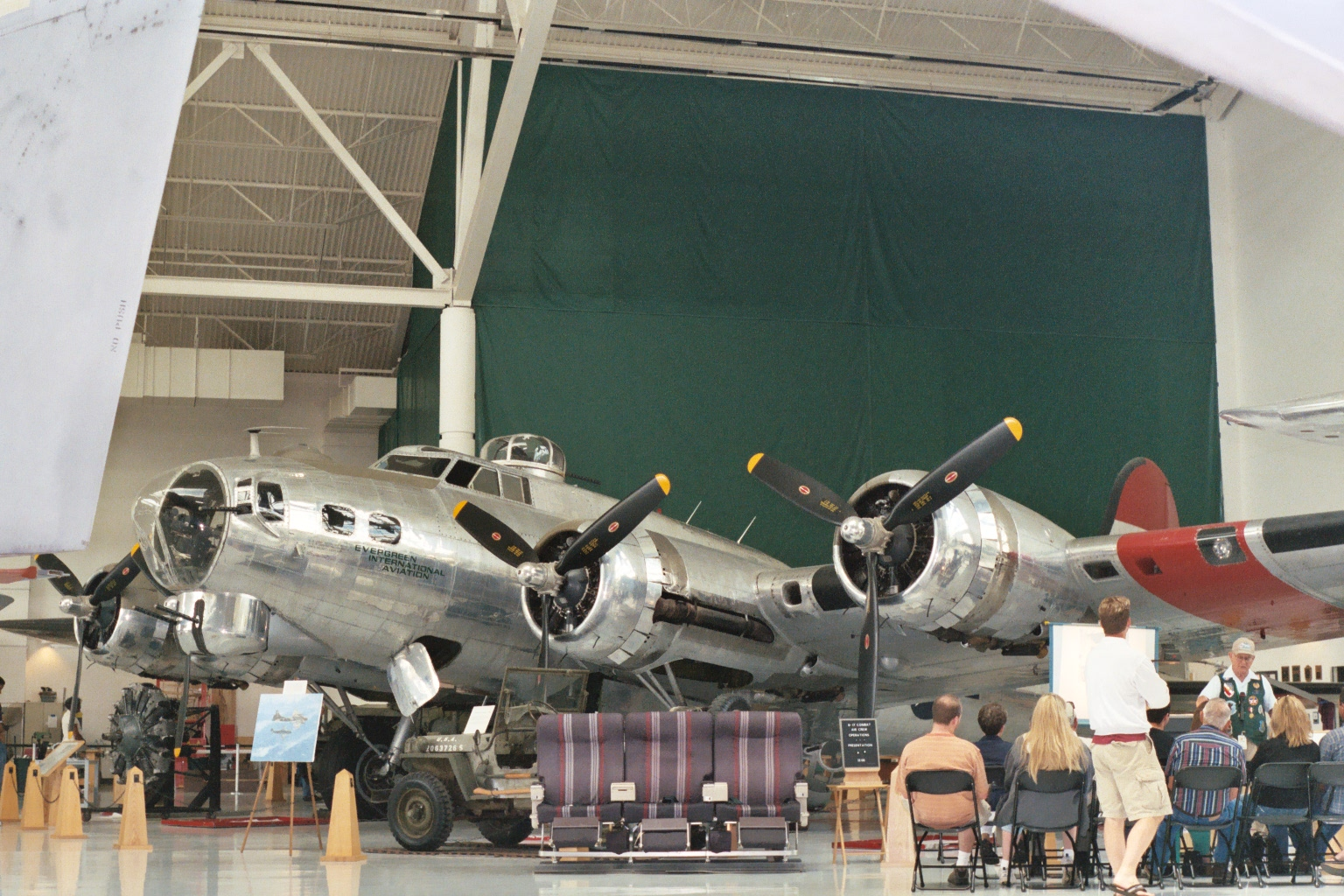
The museum's B-17G (S/N 44-83785) was acquired by the Collings Foundation.

Several of the aircraft on display at the museum were placed up for auction in February 2014 following the bankruptcy of Evergreen International Aviation. By the following January, a bank was attempting to sell 15 aircraft that belonged to the museum founder. A deal was reached four months later for the museum to purchase 25 aircraft from a bankrupt for-profit corporation with the assistance of the Collings Foundation and a developer from Maine named George Schott. While the museum received 16 of these aircraft and a new lease on the aviation building, the space building and waterpark were listed in a foreclosure auction in November. The two buildings were purchased by Jackson Family Wines in January 2016. However, the Michael King Smith Foundation filed for bankruptcy four days later and attempted to block the sale.

In July 2016, the space building and waterpark were purchased for $10.9 million by The Falls Event Center, a company owned by Steve Down. The deal allowed the museum to pay off its remaining debt. Plans at the time called for the construction of an adjacent hotel. However, the FBI began investigating Down for fraud in October 2017. After two World War II fighter airplanes were sold despite the museum's protests, his companies failed to pay a lease and an additional two aircraft were used as collateral for a loan, the museum sued Down's companies. Subsequently, the Falls Event Center filed for bankruptcy.

=== Recovery ===
In April 2020, after being in official bankruptcy status four times in five years, the museum gained renewed financial stability when the Stoller Group, owner of vineyards in the area and a winery in nearby Dayton, purchased 285 acres (115 ha) of land that included a portion of the museum and the water park; the company immediately started repair and renovation work at the museum and water park, and announced plans to expand the 50-acre (20 ha) vineyard located on the open greenspace of the grounds.

Scot Laney, a board member, became chief executive officer in August 2024. In August 2026, the facility changed its name to the North American Aerospace Museum to reflect an expanded focus.

== Facilities ==
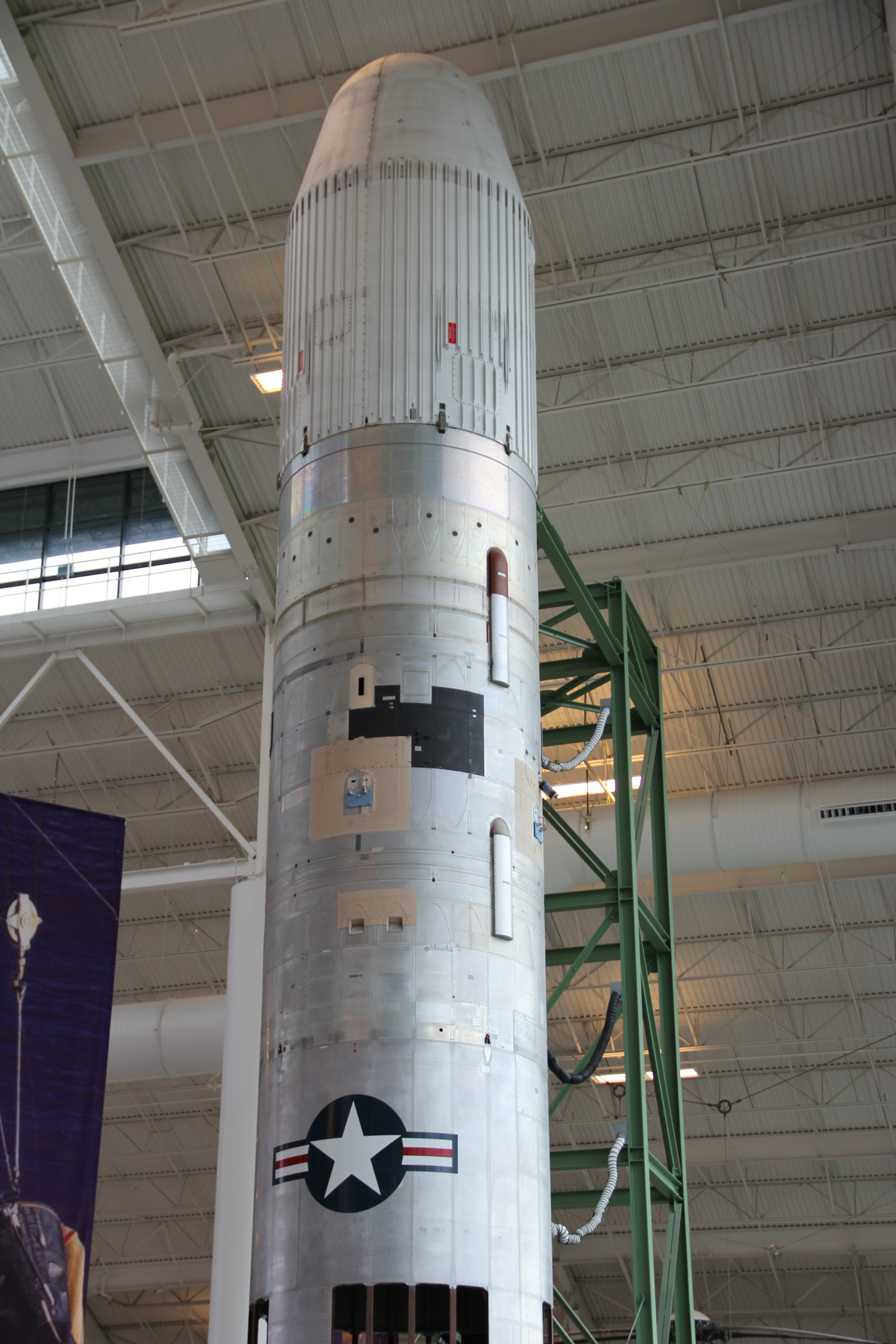
Martin Titan II SLV Space Launch Vehicle

As of 2019, two exhibit centers are open to the public: The original structure is the aviation center with the Spruce Goose as centerpiece. Other aircraft, spanning the entire history of aviation, are arranged in the building, some parked under the wings of the Spruce Goose or suspended from the ceiling.

The space flight center is in a building the same size as the aviation center. Because there are fewer space-related holdings, the center includes a large number of panels and other displays that chronicle the history of space flight. Visitors can operate flight simulators for landing the Space Shuttle as well as for docking a Gemini capsule and performing a Moon landing of the Lunar Excursion Module. The building also exhibits overflow holdings from the aviation center, usually the higher-performance jet aircraft.

Two of the main attractions of the space flight center are a Titan II SLV satellite booster rocket and a SR-71 Blackbird. The Titan II sits upright in a specially constructed display extending two stories below the floor, in order to fit the 114 foot tall rocket inside the building. The exhibit includes a re-created Titan II SLV Launch Control Room outfitted with actual furnishings and equipment donated from Vandenberg Air Force Base.

Across from the museum building is a Boeing 747-200, which was delivered to Singapore Airlines in August 1973 as 9V-SIB. This aircraft would serve multiple other airlines until it was acquired by Evergreen International Airlines in 1995, where it would remain until it was retired and donated to the museum in 2013.

In 2023, the space flight center received an F117 Nighthawk.

An F-15 Eagle is displayed on a pedestal in front of the former EIA headquarters across the highway from the museum. A bronze statue stands by on the pathway between the aviation and space museum. Both are marked in Smith's memory.

The Museum's theater, The Aerodrome Giant Screen Theater features 3D movies about flight, space travel, science, and nature.

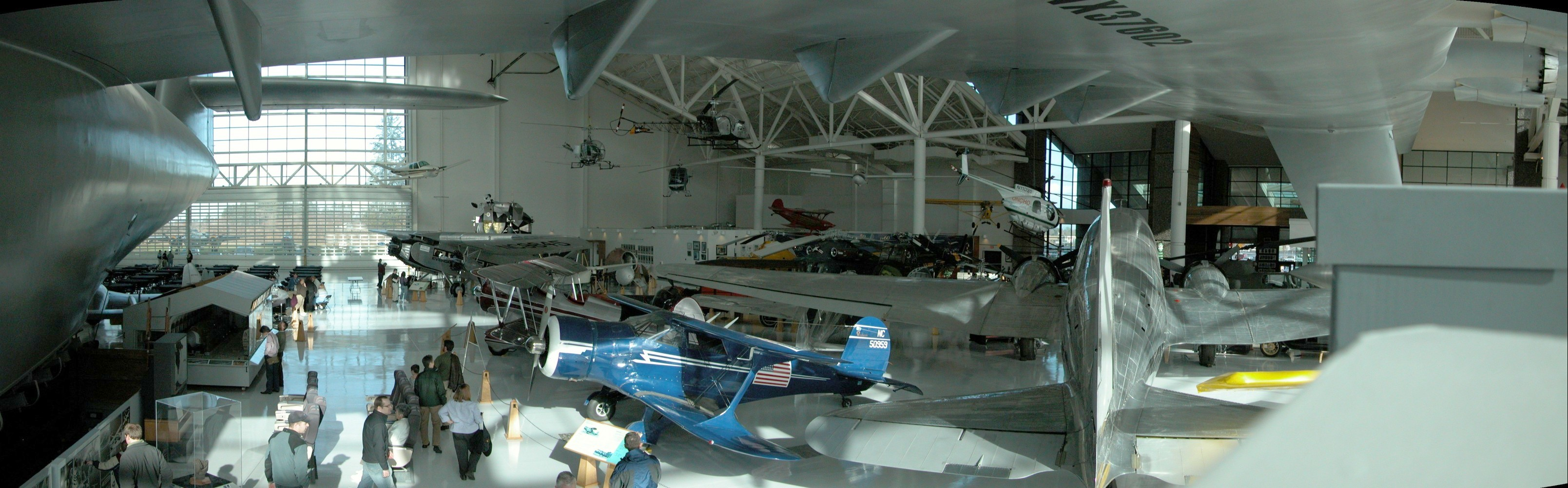
Panorama of the museum, taken from under the wing of the Hughes H-4 Hercules

== Collection ==
=== Aircraft ===
- Beechcraft C-45H Expeditor
- Beechcraft Model 17
- Beechcraft Starship
- Boeing 747
- Consolidated PBY Catalina
- Convair F-102A Delta Dagger 56‐1368
- Curtiss Robin
- Curtiss Fledgling
- Curtiss-Wright CW-15
- de Havilland DH-4
- de Havilland Venom
- Douglas EA-1F Skyraider
- Douglas A-26C Invader
- Douglas A-4 Skyhawk
- Douglas C-47 Skytrain
- Douglas DC-3A
- Douglas F5D Skylancer
- Fairchild PT-19
- Fairchild Republic A-10 Thunderbolt II
- Focke-Wulf Fw 190
- Grumman F-14D Tomcat
- Grumman TF-9J Cougar
- Hughes H-4 Hercules
- Lockheed F-94C Starfire 51‐13575
- Lockheed F-104G Starfighter
- Lockheed F-117 Nighthawk
- Lockheed SR-71A Blackbird 61‐7971
- Lockheed T‐33A 53‐5943
- McDonnell F-4C Phantom II 63‐7647
- McDonnell F-101B Voodoo 58‐0332
- McDonnell Douglas F-15A Eagle 73‐0089
- McDonnell Douglas F-15A Eagle 76‐0014
- Messerschmitt Me 262 – reproduction
- Mikoyan-Gurevich MiG-17
- Mikoyan-Gurevich MiG-21MF
- Mikoyan-Gurevich MiG-23
- Mikoyan MiG-29
- Naval Aircraft Factory N3N
- North American F-86D Sabre
- North American F-86H Sabre 53‐1251
- North American F-100 Super Sabre
- North American T-39 Sabreliner
- Northrop F-89J Scorpion
- Northrop T-38A Talon 63‐8224
- Piasecki H-21C 55‐4218
- Piper L-4 Grasshopper
- Republic F-105G Thunderchief 62‐4432
- Ryan PT-22 Recruit

=== Spacecraft ===
- Foton-6 Space Capsule
- Martin Titan II SLV Space Launch Vehicle
- Titan IV
- Mercury Space Capsule
- NASA X-38
- PGM-11 Redstone
- North American X-15
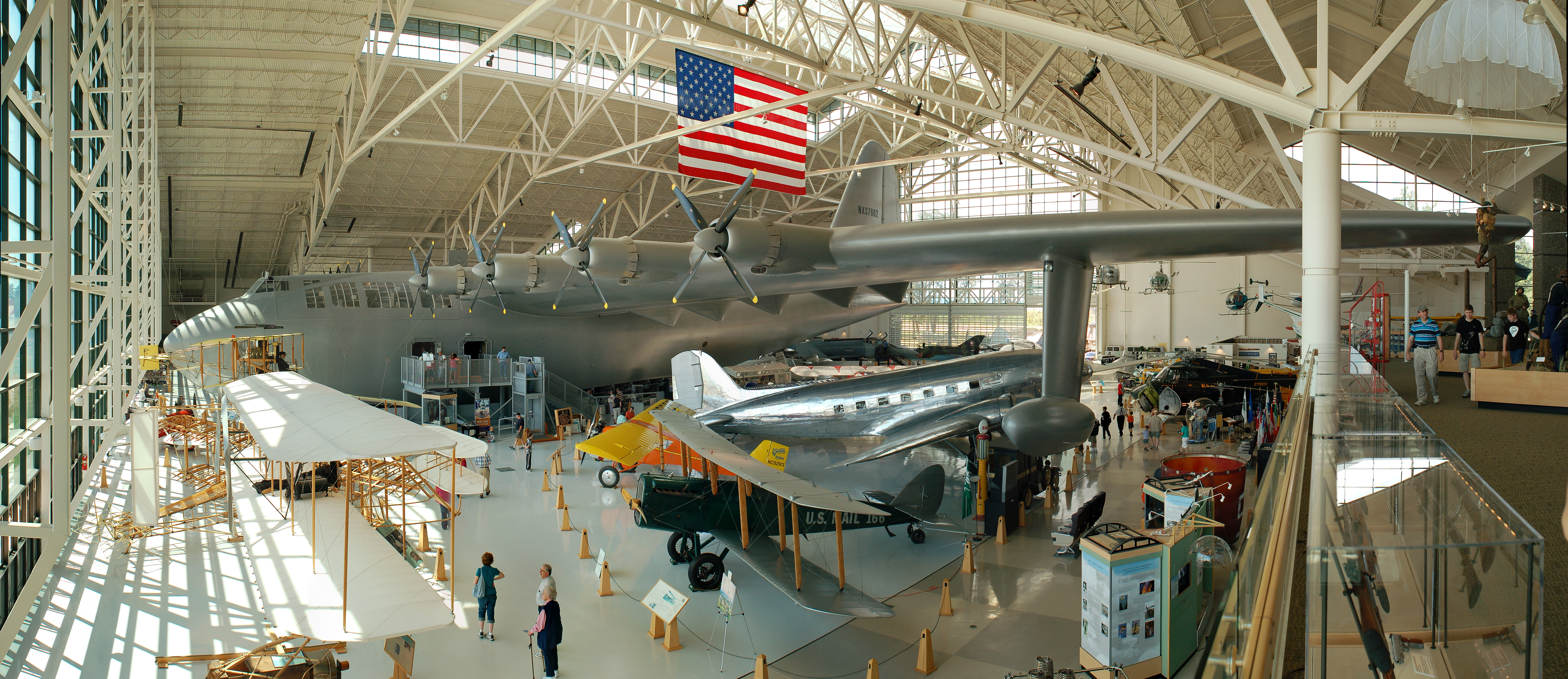
90° panorama of the museum, including the Hughes H-4 Hercules, aka Spruce Goose

== See also ==
- List of aerospace museums
- List of museums in Oregon

== Bibliography ==
- Careless, James. "How the 'Spruce Goose' Became Part of a Water Park". IAAPA. Archived from the original on August 3, 2017.
