= Warhawk Air Museum =

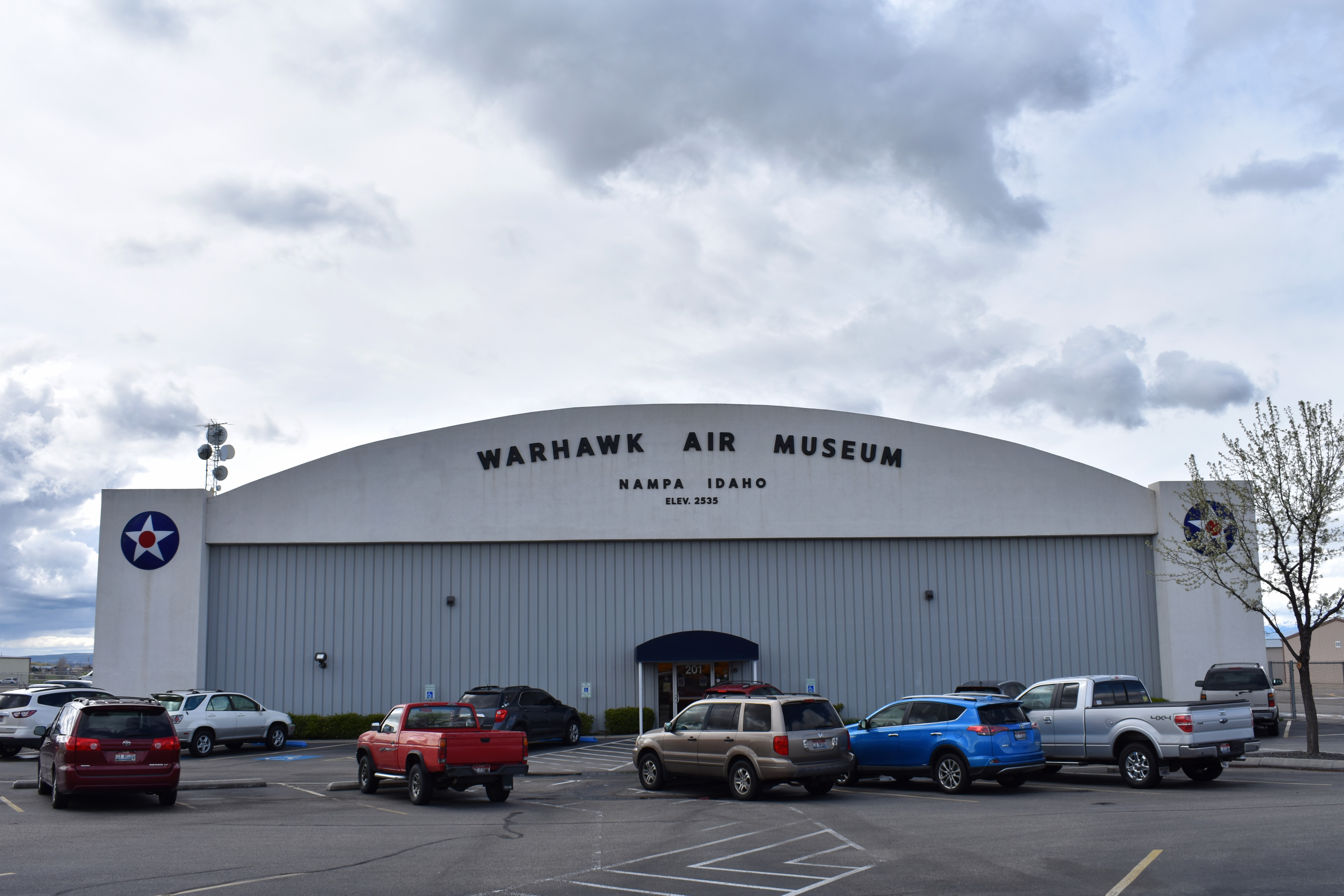

- Location within Idaho
- Established: 6 March 1989
- Location: Nampa, Idaho
- Coordinates: 43.5860°N 116.5235°W
- Type: Military aviation museum
- Founders: John Paul; Sue Paul
- Website: warhawkairmuseum.org

The Warhawk Air Museum is a military service and aviation museum located in Nampa, Idaho.

== History ==
The museum was founded on 6 March 1989 by John and Sue Paul.

The P-47 Dottie Mae, which was recovered from a lake in Austria in 2005, was restored by Vintage Airframes in Caldwell, Idaho and unveiled in August 2017 at the Warhawk Air Museum's Warbird Roundup.

In 2021, it announced plans for an expansion. Ground was broken on the expansion in October 2023.

== Collection ==
- Aero S-106
- Bell UH-1C Iroquois
- Cessna L-19 Bird Dog
- Curtiss Kittyhawk I
- Curtiss Kittyhawk IV
- Fokker Dr.I
- Lockheed F-104A Starfighter
- Naval Aircraft Factory N3N
- North American F-86F Sabre
- North American P-51C Mustang
- PZL-Mielec Lim-5
- Republic F-84G Thunderjet

=== Visiting aircraft ===
In addition to the permanent collection, the museum also previously featured a number of visiting aircraft:

- Eastern FM-2 Wildcat
- Eastern TBM Avenger
- North American P-51D Mustang
- North American SNJ-6
- North American T-28A Trojan
- Piper L-4 Grasshopper
- Stearman Kaydet

== Events ==
The museum holds an annual airshow called Warbird Roundup.

== Programs ==
The museum participates in the Veterans History Project and hosts a series of lectures called the Kilroy Coffee Klatch.
