= Corporate Responsibility Group =

British professional training organization

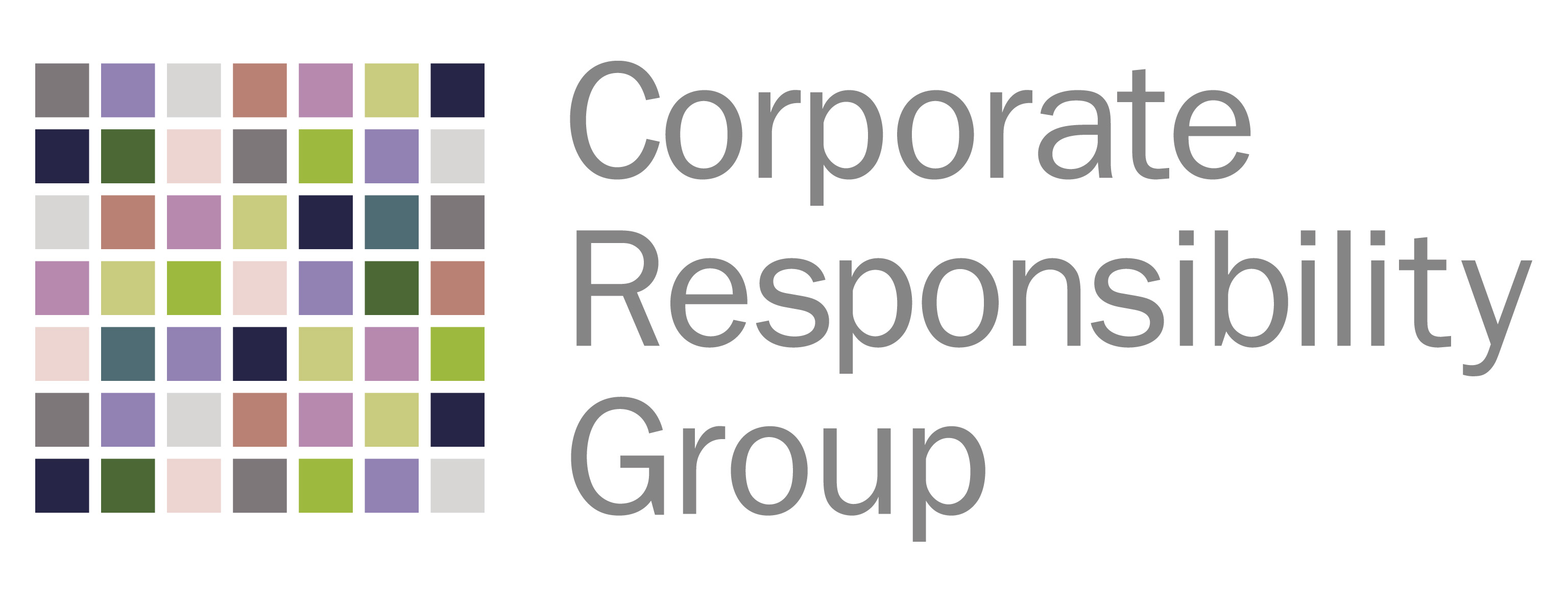
- Successor: Institute of Corporate Responsibility and Sustainability
- Founded: 1987
- Dissolved: 2015
- Type: Not-for-profit organisation
- Purpose: Corporate Responsibility, Sustainability
- Location: London, United Kingdom
- Region served: United Kingdom
- Members: 300
- Website: crguk.org

The Corporate Responsibility Group (CRG) was a training and development network for corporate responsibility (CR) and sustainability practitioners in the United Kingdom. Founded in 1987, it was succeeded in January 2015 by spin-off Institute of Corporate Responsibility and Sustainability (ICRS).

== History ==
The group was founded in 1987, as a not-for-profit organisation run by a volunteer board of corporate responsibility practitioners.

The Institute of Corporate Responsibility and Sustainability was created by CRG in 2014 to respond to the need for an organisation that supports the personal and professional development of individuals in CR, sustainability or related functions.

CRG undertook research every few years on the state of its profession. Its 2009 study found that 84% of corporate responsibility professionals considered the discipline to be a mainstream business issue, compared to 72% in 2006 survey.

In 2011 the group announced that it would create a professional body for individual corporate responsibility practitioners in the UK, distinct from the group's current organisation-membership model.

== Research ==
The group had collaborated with academia and government to produce research into the state of corporate responsibility. From 2002 to 2003 it supported the work of a UK government working group, commissioned by Stephen Timms MP, the then Minister of State for e-Commerce & Competitiveness at the Department of Trade and Industry (now BIS), looking at professional skills development in the corporate responsibility sector. Its report, "Changing Manager Mindsets", was published in 2003 in conjunction with Ashridge Business School.

In 2005 it produced a study with Ashridge Business School on the state of executive development amongst corporate responsibility professionals.

In 2007, a report published by the John F. Kennedy School of Government at Harvard University and Cranfield School of Management reported that the "professionalisation of the corporate responsibility and sustainability function in many companies... has also been supported by organisations such as CRG".

The group ran frequent members-only events, including clinics; masterclasses and networking. In 2012 it hosted interactive sessions for members with academics in the subject.

== Partnerships ==
The group had an established link with Business in the Community (BITC). By convention, the Chair of CRG sat on the Board of Directors of BITC. BITC's "Key Knowledge for CR Practitioners" primer cites CRG's Code of Conduct for CR practitioners under "Key Principles & Frameworks".

The Doughty Centre for Corporate Responsibility, at the Cranfield School of Management cites the group as a partner.

== Membership ==
Membership was vetted, and comprised over 300 corporate responsibility professionals, representing approximately 85 organisations. Membership covered those within member organisations in the private, public, and third sector, though consultants were not admitted. Among the members - many of which employ members of CRG's volunteer board - were Accenture, British American Tobacco, City of London Corporation, The Crown Estate, Herbert Smith Freehills, IBM, Linklaters, Olswang, QinetiQ, RWE npower, Tata Consultancy Services, Thomson Reuters, Wragge & Co and Zoological Society of London.

== See also ==
Institute of Corporate Responsibility and Sustainability
