= Waco CRG =

American biplane

General information
- Type: sporting biplane
- National origin: United States
- Manufacturer: Waco Aircraft Company
- Status: one airworthy in 2016
- Primary user: private operators
- Number built: 2

History
- Introduction date: 1930
- First flight: 1930
- Developed from: Waco 10

The Waco CRG is an American open-cockpit sporting biplane of the early 1930s.

== Development ==
The Waco CRG was designed specifically to win the 1930 Ford Air Tour, a 4,800 mi (7,700 km) transcontinental reliability endurance race. Waco had previously won the race in both 1928 and 1929, and built two CRGs for the 1930 competition. The CRG is a conventional biplane with straight wings with a special M18 airfoil. The landing gear shock struts were extended and featured a tailskid. The 240 hp (180 kW) Wright Wright J-6-7 radial engine was initially fitted with a speedring cowling.

== Operational history ==
Two CRGs were completed for the 1930 race. To prevent Waco from winning for a third time, Ford changed the rules so that only a Ford Trimotor could win. The CRGs achieved second and third places in the transcontinental marathon, which started at the Ford Airport, now the Ford Motor Company's Dearborn, Michigan automobile testing site. The 1930 competition was over a 5,200 mi (8,400 km) circular course passing around the U.S. Midwest and neighboring provinces of Canada.

NC600Y was flown by John H. Livingston and NC660Y by Art Davis, proprietor of the Air Circus bearing his name. Livingston's CRG, NC600Y, is now a hangar queen owned by Charles Cook of Texas. Davis' CRG ended its flying career as a cropduster in Greenville, Mississippi in 1938. Waco CRG NC600Y was re-engined in 1939 with a 350 hp (260 kW) Wright R-760E-2 and was used by the Skywriting Corporation of America, for high altitude skywriting as the original Pepsi-Cola Skywriter.

== Specifications (CRG) ==
Data from Aerofiles.com

General characteristics

- Crew: One
- Capacity: 1 or 2 passengers
- Length: 22 ft 5 in (6.83 m)
- Wingspan: 30 ft 7 in (9.32 m)
- Powerplant: 1 × Wright R-760 , 240 hp (179 kW)

Performance

- Maximum speed: 154 mph (248 km/h, 134 kn)
- Cruise speed: 130 mph (210 km/h, 110 kn)
- Stall speed: 45 mph (72 km/h, 39 kn)
- Range: 700 mi (1,100 km, 610 nmi)
