= Wright R-760 Whirlwind =

Series of radial aircraft engines

R-760 Whirlwind
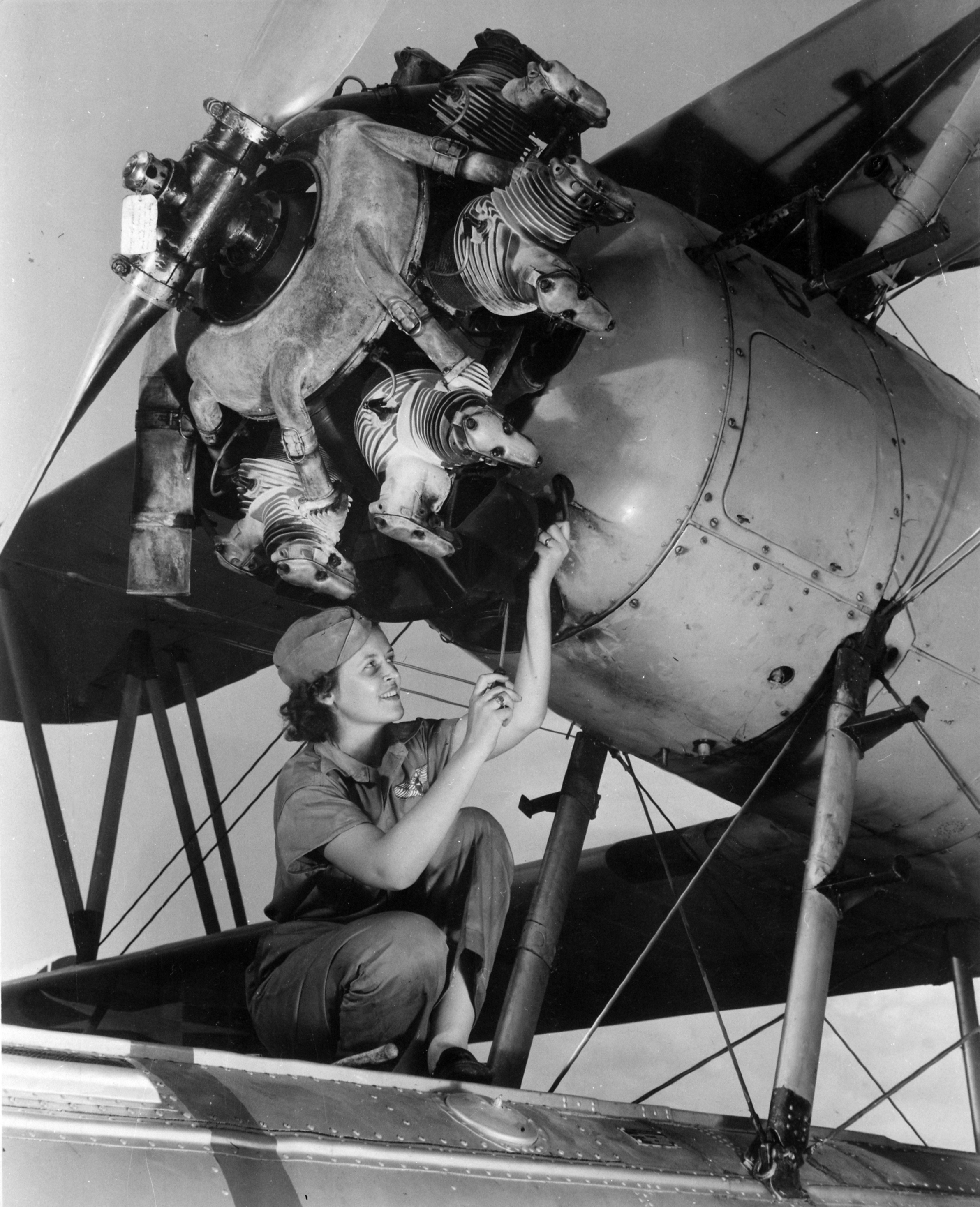
- Female mechanic working on the R-760 engine of a U.S. Navy N3N trainer in October 1942
- Type: Air-cooled 7-cylinder radial piston engine
- National origin: United States
- Manufacturer: Wright Aeronautical Corporation; Naval Aircraft Factory (under license)
- Major applications: N3N Canary U.S. Navy primary trainer Other U.S. Navy trainers; Various civil utility aircraft
- Manufactured: May 1929–January 1945
- Number built: 2,541

The Wright R-760 Whirlwind was a series of seven-cylinder air-cooled radial aircraft engines built by the Wright Aeronautical division of Curtiss-Wright. These engines had a displacement of 756 in³ (12.4 L) and power ratings of 225-350 hp (168-261 kW).

== Design and development ==
Wright introduced the J-6 Whirlwind family in 1928 to replace the nine-cylinder R-790 series. The J-6 family included varieties with five, seven, and nine cylinders. The seven-cylinder version was originally known as the J-6 Whirlwind Seven, or J-6-7 for short. The U.S. government designated it as the R-760; Wright later adopted this and dropped the J-6 nomenclature.

Like all the members of the J-6 Whirlwind family, the R-760 had larger cylinders than the R-790. The piston stroke of 5.5 in (14.0 cm) was unchanged, but the cylinder bore was expanded to 5.0 in (12.7 cm) from the R-790's bore of 4.5 in (11.4 cm). While the R-790 was naturally aspirated, the R-760, like the other J-6 engines, had a gear-driven supercharger to boost its power output.

Over time, Wright refined the R-760, using suffix letters to indicate successive versions. The original R-760 (or J-6-7) was rated for 225 hp (168 kW), while the R-760E of 1931 could do 250 hp (186 kW) thanks to an improved cylinder head design. Wright later added another suffix to show different power levels. The R-760E-1, introduced the same year as the R-760E, had a takeoff power rating of 300 hp (224 kW) thanks to higher-compression pistons and a greater RPM limit. The even more powerful R-760E-2 of 1935 could reach 350 hp (261 kW) for takeoff due to increased supercharging and an even higher RPM limit. On the other hand, the R-760E-T, designed for trainer aircraft, had the R-760E-1's high-compression pistons, but the supercharger was removed, thus giving just 235 hp (175 kW).

== Operational history ==
The R-760 was a direct replacement for the R-790, with similar displacement and power. The U.S. Navy used it as the powerplant for several biplane primary trainers, including the Consolidated NY, the Curtiss N2C Fledgling, and the Naval Aircraft Factory N3N Canary. The last of these was produced in large numbers, with most of the engines built under license by the Naval Aircraft Factory. Trainers usually had the unsupercharged R-760E-T engine.

A variety of civil utility aircraft also used the R-760, including models built by Beechcraft, Cessna, Curtiss-Wright, Howard DGA-8, Stearman, Stinson, and Waco. These aircraft generally used the various supercharged versions of the R-760.

Production of the R-760 continued until 1945, with about 1400 examples being built by Wright, and more under licence by foreign manufacturers such as Fábrica Nacional de Motores in Brazil.

== Variants ==
J-6-7 (R-760)
225 hp (168 kW) at 2,000 RPM.
R-760E
250 hp (186 kW) at 2,000 RPM. Higher power from improved cylinder head.
R-760E-1
285 hp (213 kW) at 2,100 RPM, 300 hp (224 kW) at 2,250 RPM for takeoff. Higher compression ratio.
R-760E-2
320 hp (239 kW) at 2,200 RPM, 350 hp (261 kW) at 2,400 RPM for takeoff. Increased supercharging, slightly higher compression ratio.
R-760E-T
235 hp (175 kW) at 2,000 RPM. Naturally aspirated version of R-760E-1 for trainer aircraft.
R-760-2, -4, -8
235 hp (175 kW) at 2,000 RPM. U.S. Navy versions of R-760E-T.

== Applications ==
- Abrams P-1 Explorer
- Beechcraft Staggerwing
- Cessna DC-6B Scout
- Consolidated NY-3
- Curtiss N2C-2 Fledgling
- Curtiss-Wright CW-A-14D Sportsman Deluxe
- Fairchild Model 45
- Howard DGA-8 and DGA-15W
- Naval Aircraft Factory N3N Canary
- St. Louis YPT-15
- Stearman C3R Business Speedster
- Stinson Junior
- Stinson Reliant
- Waco CSO and CTO
- Waco CJC, CJC-S, DJC, DJC-S, and DJS
- Waco CUC, DQC-6, EQC-6, DGC-7 & 8, EGC-7 & 8
- Waco CRG

== Engines on display ==
Wright R-760 engines on display are uncommon, but there is an R-760E-2 exhibited at the Evergreen Aviation & Space Museum in McMinnville, Oregon.

== Specifications (R-760E-2) ==
Data from FAA type certificate data sheet for the R-760E-2; dimensions from Curtiss-Wright (1983).

=== General characteristics ===
- Type: 7-cylinder supercharged air-cooled radial piston engine
- Bore: 5.0 in (127 mm)
- Stroke: 5.5 in (140 mm)
- Displacement: 756 in³ (12.4 L)
- Length: 42.44 in (107.8 cm)
- Diameter: 45.0 in (114.3 cm)
- Dry weight: 570 lb (259 kg)

=== Components ===
- Valvetrain: 2 valves per cylinder, pushrod-actuated
- Supercharger: gear-driven, 9.17:1 impeller gear ratio
- Fuel type: 80 octane
- Reduction gear: Direct drive

=== Performance ===
- Power output: 320 hp (239 kW) at 2,200 RPM at sea level; 350 hp (261 kW) at 2,400 RPM for takeoff
- Specific power: 0.42 hp/cu-in (19.3 kW/L)
- Compression ratio: 6.3:1
- Power-to-weight ratio: 0.56 hp/lb (0.92 kW/kg)

Specifications for different R-760 variants
Engine	Power, continuous	Power, takeoff	Compression ratio	Supercharger gear ratio	Octane rating	Dry weight
R-760E	250 hp (186 kW) at 2,000 RPM		5.1:1	7.05:1	73	530 lb (240 kg)
R-760E-1	285 hp (213 kW) at 2,100 RPM	300 hp (224 kW) at 2,250 RPM	6.1:1	7.05:1	73	565 lb (256 kg)
R-760E-2	320 hp (239 kW) at 2,200 RPM	350 hp (261 kW) at 2,400 RPM	6.3:1	9.17:1	80	570 lb (259 kg)
R-760E-T	235 hp (175 kW) at 2,000 RPM		6.1:1	none	73	540 lb (245 kg)

== See also ==
- Wright Whirlwind

Related development

- Wright J-5/R-790
- Wright J-6-5/R-540
- Wright J-6-9/R-975

Comparable engines

- Armstrong Siddeley Cheetah
- Jacobs R-755

Related lists

- List of aircraft engines
