= Curtiss R-600 Challenger =

Aircraft engine

R-600 Challenger
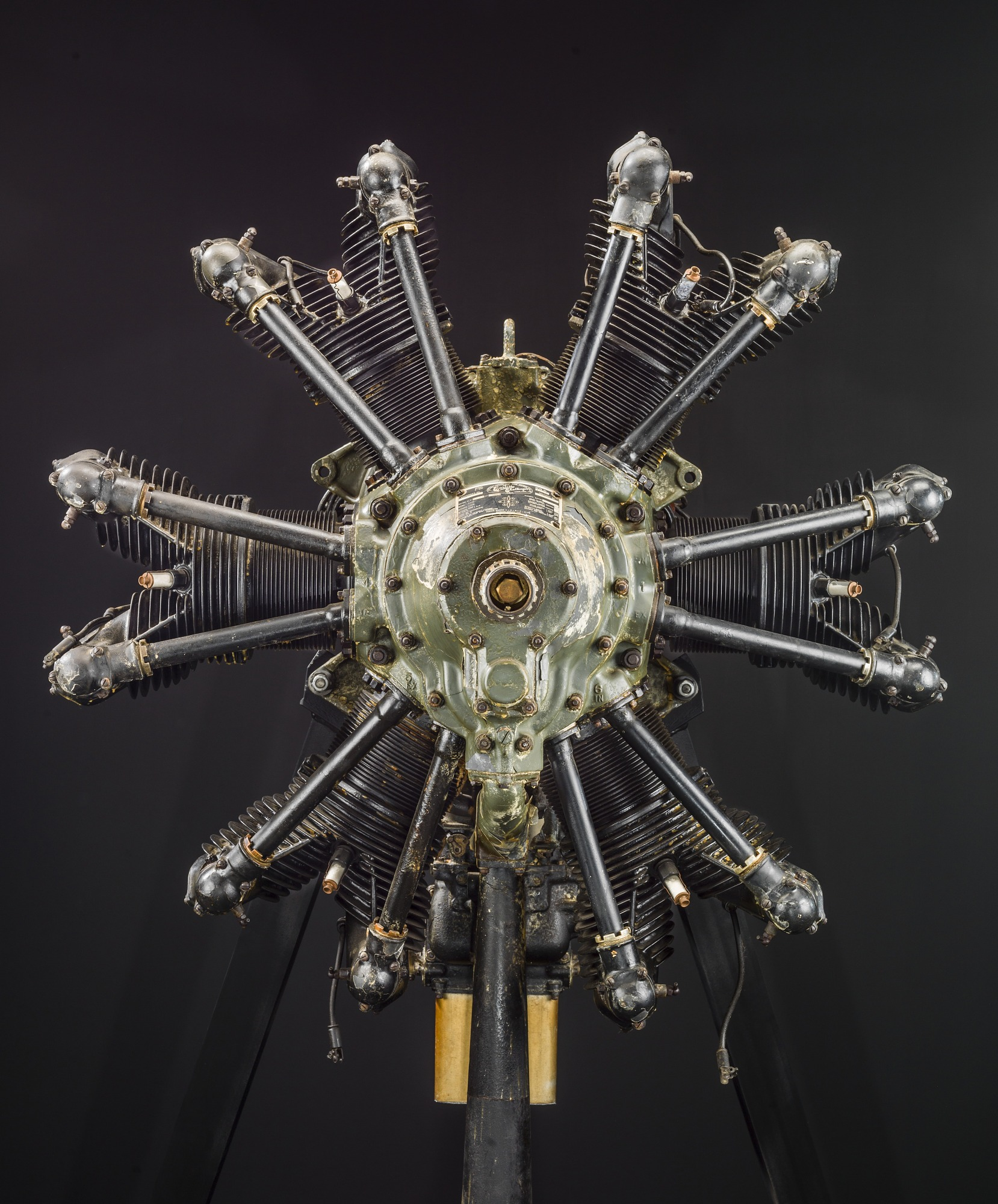
- Preserved R-600 engine
- Type: Radial engine
- Manufacturer: Curtiss Aeroplane and Motor Company
- First run: 1920s

The Curtiss R-600 Challenger was a six-cylinder, double-row, air-cooled, radial engine for aircraft use built in the United States in the late 1920s. It developed 170 to 180 horsepower (127 to 134 kW).

== Design and development ==
Curtiss started work on a small six-cylinder engine in May 1927. The engine was unusual in its design with aluminium cylinders mounted at 60°, so that it was in effect two staggered three cylinder engines. The engine was first run in December 1927, and was taken to market producing between 170 and 180 horsepower (127 and 134 kW) at 1,800 rpm.

== Applications ==
- ANBO VI
- Consolidated XPT-5
- Curtiss Robin
- Curtiss-Wright CW-14C Travel Air
- Hodkinson HT-1
- Rearwin 2000

== Specifications (R-600) ==
Data from Nutt, 1928 p.842

=== General characteristics ===
- Type: Six-cylinder, double-row, radial engine
- Bore: 5.125 in (130.2 mm)
- Stroke: 4.875 in (123.8 mm)
- Displacement: 603.4 cu in (9.89 L)
- Diameter: 42.625 in (1082.7 mm)
- Dry weight: 420lb (190.5 kg)

=== Components ===
- Cooling system: Air-cooled

=== Performance ===
- Power output: 170 hp (127 kW) at 1,800 rpm

== See also ==
Comparable engines

- Bristol Jupiter
- Continental R-670
- Pratt & Whitney R-985 Wasp Junior

Related lists

- List of aircraft engines

== Bibliography ==
- Nutt, Arthur (8 September 1928). "The Curtiss "Challenger"". Aviation: 808–842.
- USAF museum
