= Consolidated NY =

NY
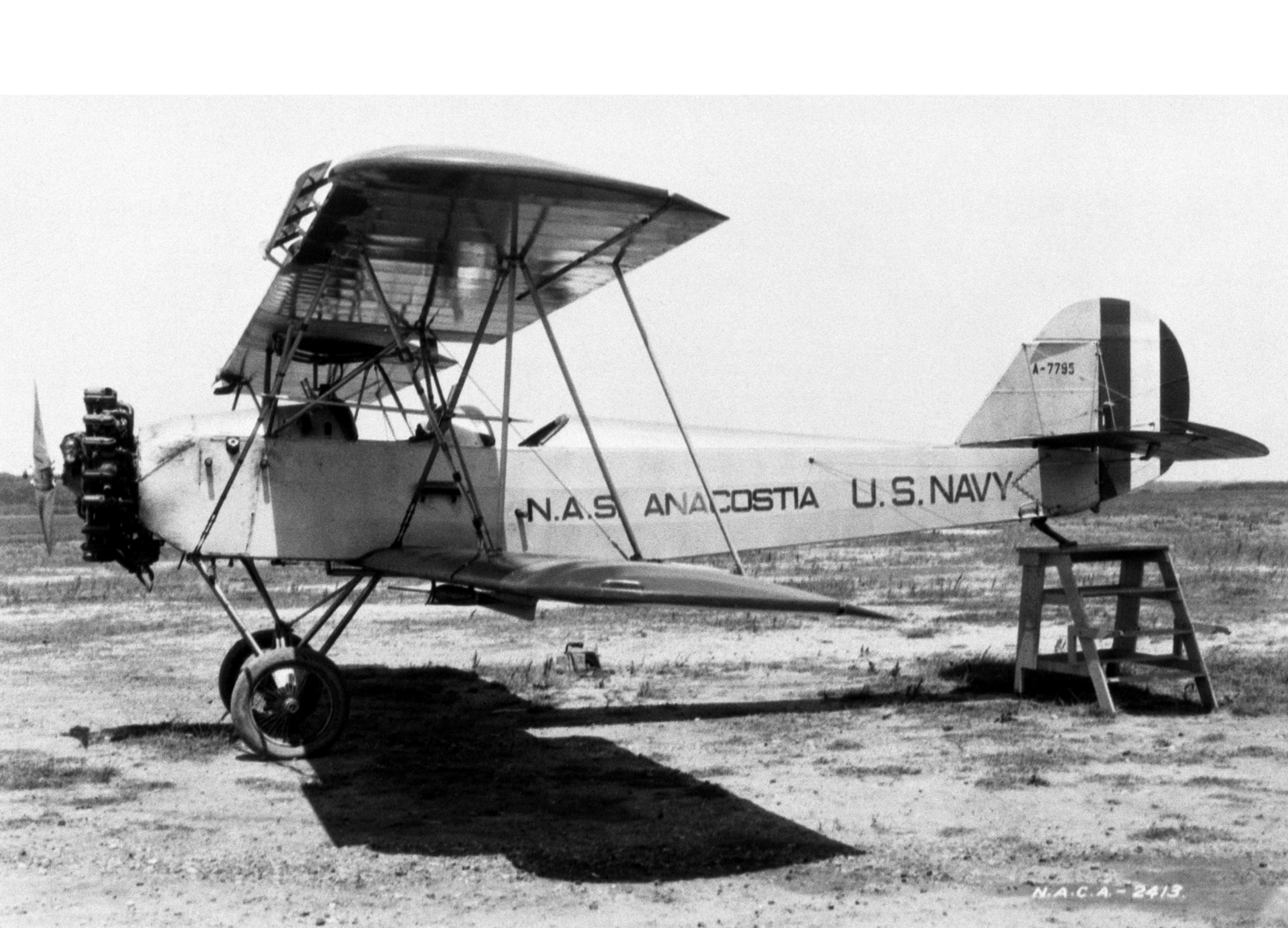
- A Consolidated NY-2 in 1928

General information
- Type: Trainer
- Manufacturer: Consolidated Aircraft
- Primary user: United States Navy
- Number built: 302

History
- Introduction date: May 1926
- First flight: November 1925
- Retired: 1939
- Developed from: Dayton-Wright TW-3
- Variant: Consolidated PT-3

The Consolidated Model 2 was a biplane trainer manufactured by the Consolidated Aircraft Corporation and diverted to the United States Navy for a trainer competition in 1925. It beat out 14 other designs, and was ordered into production as the NY-1.

== Development ==
The NY-1 was essentially a PT-1 with provisions for the wheeled landing gear to be replaced by a single large float under the fuselage and two stabilising floats under the tips of the lower wing. A larger vertical tail was added to counter the effect of the floats. The NY-2 had a longer span wing fitted to overcome the high wing-loading issue of the seaplane version. Tested with complete success during October 1926, the Navy ordered 181 with the uprated R-790-8 Wright Whirlwind J-5 engine of 220 hp (164 kW). The NY-3 aircraft were similar to the NY-2 but had 240 hp (179 kW) Wright R-760-94 engines.

== Operational history ==
The NY-1's first flight was November 1925, with deliveries starting May 1926. The NY-2's first flight was October 1926. The Navy had 108 in active use in 1929, with 35 more assigned to reserve squadrons. The NY-3 was delivered in 1929. The NY series was being phased out in the mid-1930s, with 15 in service in 1937, and one in service in 1939.

== Variants ==
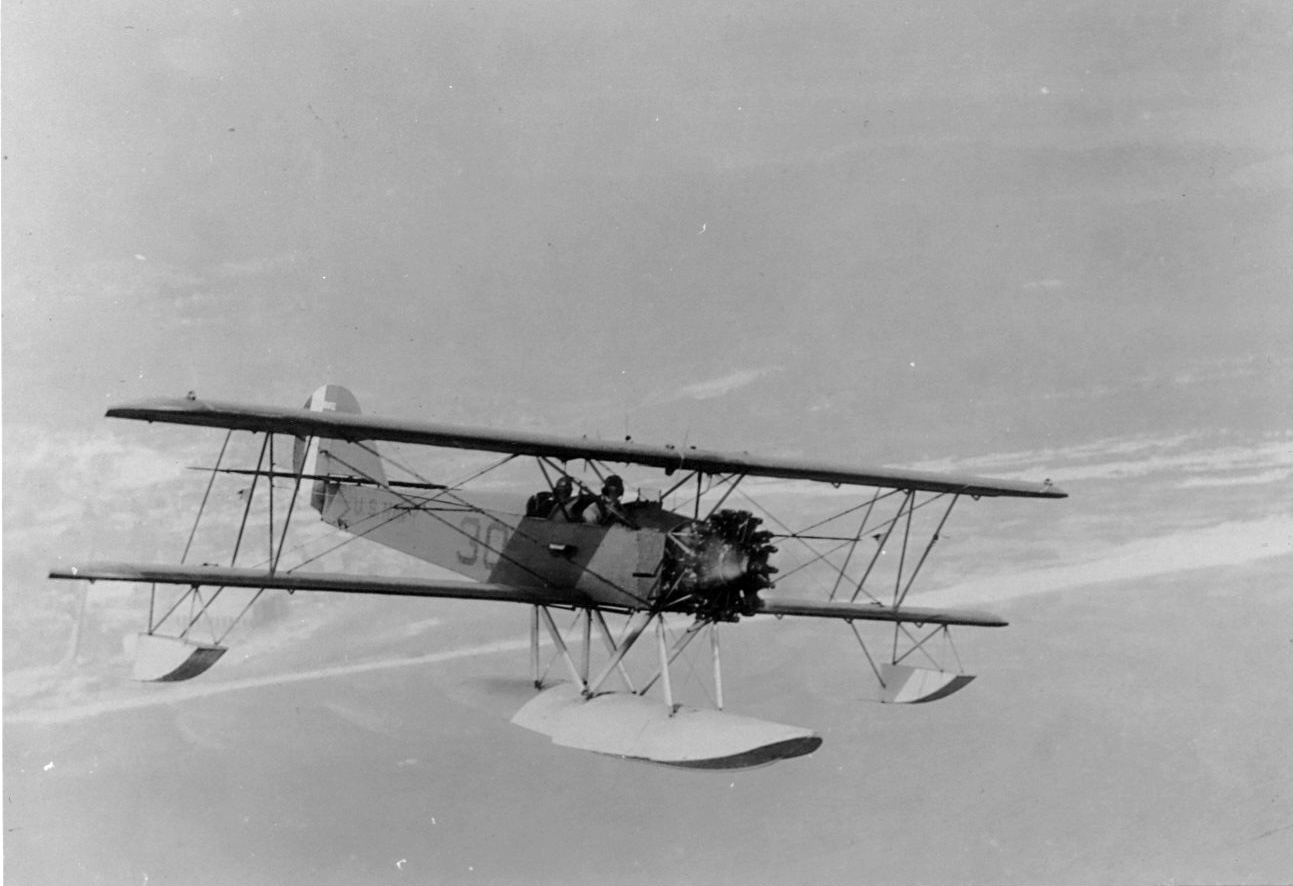
An NY seaplane near Naval Air Station Pensacola, circa 1924.

NY-1
wingspan 34 ft 6 in (10.52 m), 200 hp (149 kW) Wright J-4 Whirlwind, 76 built.
NY-1A
a number of NY-1 aircraft modified for gunnery training with one .30 in (7.62 mm) trainable machine gun in the rear cockpit.
NY-1B
a number of retrofitted NY-1 aircraft with the long-span wings of the NY-2 and the 220 hp (164 kW) Wright J-5 Whirlwind.
NY-2
wingspan increased to 40 ft (12.19 m), 220 hp J-5, 181 built.
NY-2A
NY-2 aircraft armed for gunnery training, 25 built.
NY-3
similar to the NY-2 with a 240 hp (179 kW) Wright R-760-94 Whirlwind, 20 built.
XN3Y-1
a single NY-2 tested with a Wright R-790-A Whirlwind.
D1C
Brazilian Navy designation for the NY-2.

== Operators ==
Brazil

- Brazilian Naval Aviation

United States

- United States Navy
- United States Marine Corps

== Specifications (NY-2 floatplane) ==
Data from The Complete Encyclopedia of World Aircraft Editors: Paul Eden & Soph Moeng, 2002, ISBN 0-7607-3432-1), page 478.

General characteristics

- Crew: 2
- Length: 31 ft 4.25 in (9.56 m)
- Wingspan: 40 ft 0 in (12.19 m)
- Height: 11 ft 10 in (3.61 m)
- Wing area: 370 sq ft (34.37 m^{2})
- Empty weight: 2,145 lb (973 kg)
- Max takeoff weight: 2,843 lb (1,290 kg)
- Powerplant: 1 × Wright R-760-8 Whirlwind air-cooled radial, 220 hp (164 kW)

Performance

- Maximum speed: 78 kn (90 mph, 145 km/h) at sea level
- Cruise speed: 65 kn (75 mph, 121 km/h)
- Range: 182.5 nmi (210 mi, 338 km)
- Service ceiling: 11,000 ft (3,355 m)
- Rate of climb: 865 ft/min (4.4 m/s)

Armament
None

== See also ==
Related lists

- List of United States Navy aircraft designations (pre-1962)
