= 1929 in aviation =

This is a list of aviation-related events from 1929:

== Events ==
- During the year, the greatest number of fatal civil aircraft crashes in United States history take place.
- Cubana de Aviación begins service.
- Pan American World Airways begins service.
- The Canadian Siskins aerobatic team is formed.
- The first official airmail delivery by bush pilot to the District of Mackenzie in Canada's western Arctic takes place.
- An airway beacon is built in St. Paul, Minnesota. It still exists in Indian Mounds Park.
- Aircraft Development Corporation changes its name to the Detroit Aircraft Corporation.
- Consolidated Aircraft Corporation absorbs the Thomas-Morse Aircraft Corporation.
- In response to the creation of the Curtiss-Wright Corporation, the United Aircraft and Transport Corporation is formed as a holding company controlling the stock of the Boeing Airplane Company, the Chance Vought Corporation, the Hamilton Aero Manufacturing Company, and the Pratt & Whitney Aircraft Company, soon joined by the Sikorsky Aviation Corporation, the Stearman Aircraft Company, the Standard Steel Propeller Company, and several airlines managed by the new United Air Lines, Inc. management company.
- The Glenn L. Martin Company sells its factory in Cleveland, Ohio, and moves to a new one at Middle River, Maryland.
- The Imperial Japanese Navy begins to gather information on aerial techniques, training, and aircraft necessary for dive bombing.
- The Royal Swedish Navy assigns a ship to aviation service for the first time.
- Saunders-Roe Limited, also known as Saro, is formed.
- United States Army Sergeant Ralph W. Bottriell makes his 500th and final parachute jump, the most by anyone in the world at the time. He then stops parachuting and becomes a ground instructor.

=== January ===
- The Cierva C.8W autogyro makes the first autogyro flight in the United States, at Willow Grove, Pennsylvania.
- January 1 – The Government of Poland creates LOT Polish Airlines as a state-owned, self-governing corporation.
- January 1–7 – Carl Spaatz and four other United States Army Air Corps fliers set an endurance record of 151 hours aloft in the modified Atlantic-Fokker C-2A Question Mark.
- January 3 – Australian aviators Charles Kingsford Smith and Charles Ulm found Australian National Airways (ANA), the first airline of that name. It will begin scheduled services in January 1930.
- January 14 – The United States Department of Commerce's Aeronautics Branch receives the Aero Club of America Trophy (the future Collier Trophy) for 1928 for its outstanding development of airways and air navigation facilities.
- January 15 – The Fairchild FC-2W2 Stars and Stripes makes the first flight from Little America, a base Richard E. Byrd and his team had recently set up on the Ross Ice Shelf off Antarctica to support his planned attempt at the first flight over the South Pole.
- January 25
  - While circling at an altitude of 2,000 feet (610 m) over Little America off Antarctica, the Fairchild FC-2W2 Stars and Stripes sets a record for the longest distance for a two-way telegraphic connection between air and ground, maintaining continuous contact with San Francisco, California, and New York City.
  - Pan American Airways and W. R. Grace and Company found Pan American-Grace Airways (Panagra).
- January 27
  - The Fairchild FC-2W2 Stars and Stripes makes it first significant flight over Antarctica. Richard Byrd discovers 14 mountains and an island during the five-hour flight.
  - Aircraft from the United States Navy aircraft carrier USS Saratoga (CV-3) carry out a successful simulated dawn raid on the Panama Canal in a training exercise. Despite facing a defending force including the aircraft carrier USS Lexington (CV-2) and shore-based U.S. Navy and United States Army aircraft, the strike force is judged to have "destroyed" the canal locks and airfields in the Panama Canal Zone. Admiral William V. Pratt describes the exercise as "the most brilliantly conceived and most effectively executed naval operation in our [i.e., U.S. Navy] history."
- January 29 – The Airways Division of the United States Department of Commerce turns on Beacon No. 25 at Miriam, Nevada, on the San Francisco–Salt Lake City Airway, completing the lighting of the Transcontinental Airway System in the United States by closing the final 20-mile (32 km) unlighted gap.
- January 30 – Inter-Island Airways, the future Hawaiian Airlines, is founded.

=== February ===
- Harold Pitcairn purchases the U.S. rights to all of Juan de la Cierva′s autogiro inventions and patents then in existence and establishes the Pitcairn-Cierva Autogiro Company.
- February 1 – Regulations covering the entry and clearance of aircraft carrying foreign cargo and passengers into the United States issued by the United States Department of Commerce's Aeronautics Branch (predecessor of the Federal Aviation Administration) go into effect.
- February 4 – Henry Berliner and Temple Nach Joyce found the Berliner-Joyce Aircraft Corporation.
- February 4–5 (overnight) – With Oscar Grubb aboard as flight engineer, Frank Hawks sets a transcontinental airspeed record for a flight across the continental United States while ferrying the Lockheed Air Express (registration NR7955) from the Lockheed factory in Burbank, California, to an air show in New York City, making the flight in 18 hours 21 minutes. The use of a NACA cowling increases the aircraft's maximum speed from 157 to 177 miles per hour (253 to 285 km/h).
- February 19 — Flying the Fairchild FC-2W2 Stars and Stripes over Antarctica, Richard E. Byrd discovers an area he names Marie Byrd Land and claims it for the United States. Since 15 January, when Stars and Stripes began flights from Little America, Byrd's base on the Ross Ice Shelf, Byrd has used Stars and Stripes to explore and chart about 40,000 square miles (100,000 km^{2}) of territory which he describes as "never before seen by human eye."

=== March ===
- March 2
  - Seeking a safe route across the Andes between Buenos Aires, Argentina, and Santiago, Chile, to avoid the 1,000-kilometer (620-mile) detour aircraft routinely made to avoid the mountains, a Latécoère 25 piloted by Jean Mermoz and carrying his mechanic, Alexandre Collenot, and Count Henry de La Vaulx as passengers is caught in a downdraft and forced to land on a 300-meter-wide (986-foot-wide) plateau at an altitude of 4,000 meters (13,000 feet). The three men spend four days repairing and lightening the plane and clearing a path to the edge of the plateau, after which they roll it off the edge, Mermoz dives to gain airspeed, and they arrive safely in Santiago. The event is celebrated widely.
  - The United States Department of Commerce's publication Domestic Air News reports that the United States Post Office Department has awarded the air mail contract for the route from Cristóbal in the Panama Canal Zone to Santiago, Chile, to Pan American-Grace Airways (Panagra). It is the longest air mail route in the world at the time.
- March 13 – The Spanish government airline CLASSA is formally established as a company, formed by the merger of Iberia and several other Spanish airlines.
- March 17 – The Colonial Western Airways Ford 4-AT-B Trimotor NC7683 suffers a double engine failure during its initial climb after takeoff from Newark Airport in Newark, New Jersey. It fails to gain height and crashes into a railroad freight car loaded with sand, killing 14 of the 15 people on board the aircraft. At the time, this is the deadliest airplane accident in American history.
- March 19 – The newly completed Ford 5-AT-B Trimotor NC9674, which had made its first flight only five days earlier, crashes when its wing strikes the ground on landing while it returns to Ford Airport in Dearborn, Michigan, during a Ford Motor Company flight prior to delivery to its customer. All four people on board die.
- March 21 – Bernt Balchen pilots the Fairchild FC-2W2 Stars and Stripes from Little America, Richard E. Byrd's base on the Ross Ice Shelf, over Antarctica to rescue Byrd and two other members of his expedition. Byrd and the other two men previously had rescued Balchen and two scientists after their plane — the Fokker Super Universal The Virginia (NC4453) — was destroyed in a storm, then remained behind when Balchen and the two scientists flew back to Little America aboard Stars and Stripes. Byrd and the other two men then had been stranded by new storms until the weather improved and allowed Balchen to return to pick them up.
- March 30 – Imperial Airways commences the first scheduled air service between the United Kingdom and British India.

=== April ===
- April 2–6 – Flying a biplane in support of rebel forces during the Escobar Rebellion in Mexico, Irish pilot Patrick Murphy makes a number of bombing raids against Naco in the Mexican state of Sonora in which he mistakenly drops bombs across the border in the United States on three occasions, damaging several buildings and destroying a car in neighboring Naco, Arizona. It is the first time in history that U.S. territory has come under aerial bombing attack by a foreign aircraft.
- April 21 – A United States Army Air Corps Boeing PW-9D fighter, 28-037, performing stunts over San Diego, California, attempts to pass in front of the Maddux Air Lines Ford 5-AT-B Trimotor NC9636, which is on a scheduled passenger flight from San Diego to Phoenix, Arizona. The PW-9D strikes the Trimotor's cockpit, and both aircraft crash, killing the PW-9D pilot and all five people aboard the airliner.
- April 24–26 – Royal Air Force Squadron Leader Arthur G. Jones-Williams and Flight Lieutenant Norman H. Jenkins make the first non-stop flight from the United Kingdom to British India, using a Fairey Long-Range Monoplane. The flight, from RAF Cranwell to Karachi, covers 4,130 miles (6,650 kilometers) nonstop in 50 hours 48 minutes, falling 336 miles (541 kilometers) short of the world nonstop flight distance record.

=== May ===
- May 9 – The United States Government establishes the Interdepartmental Committee on Airways to study and pass on applications for the extension of civil airways in the United States. The six-member committee consists of three representatives each from the United States Department of Commerce and the United States Post Office Department.
- May 16 – At the first Academy Awards ceremony, the first award in history for Outstanding Picture (later renamed "Best Picture") goes to an aviation-themed film, the 1927 silent film Wings about two fighter pilots in World War I.
- May 20 – The Peruvian Army's aviation branch and the Peruvian Navy's Naval Aviation Corps are combined to form the Peruvian Aviation Corps, forerunner of the Peruvian Air Force.
- May 25 – The Spanish government airline CLASSA officially assumes all the rights, obligations, fleets, and staff of Iberia and the other airlines that merged to form it.
- May 26 – Flying a Junkers W 34 be/b3e (registration D-1119), Friedrich W. Neuenhofen sets a new world altitude record, reaching 12,739 meters (41,795 feet).
- May 28
  - Marvel Crosson sets a women's altitude record, climbing to 23,996 feet (7,314 meters) over Los Angeles, California, in a Travel Air J-5.
  - Flying a 690 lb (313 kg) Nicholas-Beazley NB-3 monoplane (also known as the Barling NB-3), Barney Zimmerly, a test pilot for the Nicholas-Beazley Airplane Company, reaches an altitude of 24,600 feet (7,498 meters) over Parks Airport in East St. Louis, Illinois. He sets a new altitude record both for single-seater airplanes and for airplanes weighing less than 400 kg (881 lbs).
- May 30 – Logan Field opens at Baltimore, Maryland.

=== June ===
- Thirty-five Regia Aeronautica (Italian Royal Air Force) seaplanes – 32 Savoia-Marchetti S.55s, two Savoia-Marchetti S.59s, and one CANT 22 – led by General Italo Balbo and famed Italian aviator Francesco de Pinedo make a 3,300-mile (5,314-km) mass-formation flight circuiting the Eastern Mediterranean, with stops at Taranto, Italy; Athens, Greece; Istanbul, Turkey; Varna, Bulgaria; Odessa in the Soviet Union; and Constanta, Romania. The flight is intended to improve the operational skills of Regia Aeronautica aircrews and ground crewmen, showcase the Italian aviation industry to potential foreign buyers of Italian-made aircraft, and enhance the prestige of Benito Mussolini's Italian Fascist government.
- Frank Hawks sets a transcontinental airspeed record for a flight across the continental United States, flying the Lockheed Air Express Texaco Five (registration NR7955) across the country in 17 hours 38 minutes.
- The United States has over 6,000 licensed pilots. Fifty of them are women, of whom six are commercial pilots.
- The Women’s Aeronautical Association of California proposes a $10,000 air race "for women only" from Santa Monica, California, to Cleveland, Ohio, a distance of 2,500 miles (4,000 km). Time reports that the proposal meets with derision from some male pilots, who claim that female aviators are "publicity harpies" who have not "accomplished anything unusual," that women's flight records are not recorded officially and mean nothing, that women lack the nerves, stamina, perseverance, and confidence for flying, and that in the proposed race "none of them will be able to get over" the Rocky Mountains. They suggest that the proposed race instead be held over level ground from Omaha, Nebraska, to Cleveland and that a male pilot accompany each woman racer "to extricate her from flying difficulties." Amelia Earhart rebukes the men for these views, arguing that "women are less expert than men at flying" only because American culture does not encourage them to become mechanics, bus drivers, locomotive engineers, or ship's officers, that "women can fly" despite this, and that women will not be able to improve as aviators without opportunities like the proposed race. She threatens that if women were not permitted to navigate the entire Santa Monica-to-Cleveland course, neither she nor other women pilots would enter.
- An amendment to the Air Commerce Act goes into effect in the United States providing for United States Government licensing of flying schools, whose instructors must be licensed as ether flying or ground instructors.
- June 9 – Swedish aviator Albin Ahrenberg and two other men take off from Stockholm, Sweden, in the Junkers W 33 floatplane Sverige ("Sweden") in an attempt to demonstrate the viability of a northern route across the Atlantic Ocean to New York City, with refueling stops at Bergen in Norway, Iceland, Greenland, and Labrador. The flight experiences significant delays in Iceland due to adverse weather and mechanical problems, but reaches Greenland in July, a month after departing Stockholm. Attempts to reach Labrador from Greenland are unsuccessful due to further weather and mechanical problems, and the rest of the flight is cancelled later in July.
- June 13 – The United States Coast Guard establishes an "air traffic flight-following" capability along the coast of the continental United States employing a network of Coast Guard radio stations.
- June 17
  - Using a six-passenger Travel Air, Delta Air Service (the future Delta Air Lines) begins passenger service with a first flight from Dallas, Texas, to Jackson, Mississippi, with stops at Shreveport and Monroe, Louisiana.
  - The Imperial Airways Handley Page W.10 City of Ottawa (G-EBMT) suffers an engine failure and ditches in the English Channel off Dungeness, England. Seven of the 13 people aboard die; the Belgian fishing trawler Gaby rescues the six survivors, all of whom are injured.
- June 21 – A Spanish Air Force crew led by pilot Major Ramón Franco – brother of future Spanish dictator Francisco Franco – takes off from Los Alcázares, Spain, in the Dornier Do J Wal ("Whale") flying boat Numancia to attempt a westward flight around the world, intending to begin with an overnight flight to their first stop at the Azores. They overshoot the Azores, run out of fuel, and forced to land in the North Atlantic Ocean on June 22, where they drift until picked up by the Royal Navy aircraft carrier HMS Eagle on June 29. Their round-the-world attempt is scrubbed.
- June 29
  - Phoebe Omlie sets a women's world altitude record, reaching 25,400 feet (7,742 meters) in a Monocoupe 90 above the airport at Moline, Illinois.
  - The Curtiss Aeroplane and Motor Company and the Wright Aeronautical Corporation merge to form the Curtiss-Wright Corporation. The new corporation constructs light aircraft at the Curtiss plant in Buffalo, New York; heavy aircraft and flying boats at its Keystone Aircraft Corporation subsidiary in Bristol, Pennsylvania; civil aircraft at its Curtiss-Robertson subsidiary in St. Louis, Missouri; and Curtiss and Wright aircraft engines at the Wright factory in Paterson, New Jersey.
- June 30
  - During a flight from Moline, Illinois, pilot Phoebe Omlie sets a women's altitude record, reaching 25,400 feet (7,742 m) over Iowa City, Iowa.
  - The United States Department of Commerce's Aeronautics Branch (predecessor of the Federal Aviation Administration) has issued a total of 170 type certificates to aircraft.
  - The U.S. Department of Commerce's Aeronautics Branch reports that since July 1928 it has standardized a four-course radio range system in which pilots listen to aural signals to determine if they are on course, and that seven of these standard radio beacons are in operation, providing a continuous radio-marked course between Omaha, Nebraska, and New York City and between Key West, Florida, and Havana, Cuba.

=== July ===
- In an article entitled "Is Flying Safe?" in the July 1929 issue of Scientific American, Irish aviator Mary, Lady Heath, writes that the most important factors in making airline travel safe are well-trained pilots and strict construction standards for aircraft.
- July 1 – The United States Department of Commerce begins using teletype machines to transmit aviation weather information. Among the first airport stations to receive teletypes are those at Hadley Field, New Jersey; Cleveland, Ohio; Chicago, Illinois; and Concord, California, all of which are connected with the central office in Washington, D.C., from which data are exchanged for all locations.
- July 3
  - Lieutenant A. W. Gordon hooks a Vought UO-1 onto the United States Navy airship USS Los Angeles (ZR-3) in successful parasite fighter experiments.
  - The airline Aeropostal Alas de Venezuela (LAV) is founded in Venezuela. It begins operations with a fleet of three Latécoère 28s.
- July 4 – The Japanese aviator Masashi Goto crashes and is killed in Utah's Uinta Mountains in the beginning stages of an attempted flight around the world by crossing the continents of North America, Europe, and Asia.
- July 7
  - Denied permission by Spanish authorities to make a transatlantic flight in the Bernard 191GR La France to New York City from Seville — in deference to the Government of France, which had prohibited its citizens from making transatlantic flights, deeming them a useless hazard — French World War I flying ace Louis Coudouret heads back to France bound for Angoulême. At an altitude of 500 metres (1,640 feet), he loses control of the plane due to engine failure and crashes at Saint-Amant-de-Bonnieure. Coudouret dies of his injuries hours after the crash, but his two passengers survive.
  - Transcontinental Air Transport commences a regular service transporting passengers all the way across the continental United States in 48 hours, using a combination of trains and aircraft for different legs of the journey, with airplanes carrying passengers during daylight portions of the trip and trains carrying them at night. Charles Lindbergh flies the first plane over the route.
- July 13
  - The French aviators Dieudonné Costes and Maurice Bellonte take off from Villacoublay, France, in an attempt to fly across the North Atlantic Ocean to New York City. Bad weather will force them to turn back after 17 hours.
  - The Polish aviator Ludwik Idzikowski crashes in the Azores and dies while attempting a westbound transatlantic flight.
- July 17 – Delta Air Lines starts commercial airline operations.
- July 22 – Deutsche Luft Hansa uses a catapult to launch a Heinkel He 12 mail plane from the passenger liner Bremen, 400 km (249 mi; 216 nmi) out from New York City, speeding the mail on its way before the ship reaches port.

=== August ===
- To address an outbreak of Arab raids against Jewish villages in Palestine, the British aircraft carrier HMS Courageous arrives off Jaffa and disembarks all of her aircraft to operate from a desert landing strip at Gaza. They operate over Palestine for four weeks before reembarking aboard Courageous in September.
- August 2–10 – The English aviator and ornithologist Mary Russell, Duchess of Bedford, her personal pilot C. D. Barnard, and mechanic Robert Little make a record-breaking flight in the Fokker F.VII Spider (G-EBTS) of 10,000 miles (16,000 km) from Lympne Airport in Lympne, England, to Karachi, then in the British Indian Empire, and back to Croydon Airport in South London, England, in eight days.
- August 4–16 – The first International Tourist Aircraft Contest Challenge 1929 takes place in Paris, with a 5,942 km (3,692 mi) race over Europe. The German crew of Fritz Morzik wins in the BFW M.23 plane.
- August 8–29 – The German rigid airship LZ 127 Graf Zeppelin makes the first round-the-world flight by a rigid airship, leaving from Lakehurst, New Jersey, and returning to Lakehurst in 21 days 7 hours 34 minutes. It is only the second round-the-world flight of any kind, and the first since a circumnavigation by two United States Army Air Service Douglas World Cruisers accomplished between April and September 1924. Graf Zeppelin's eastbound journey across the Northern Hemisphere includes a leg from Tokyo, Japan, to Los Angeles, California, the first nonstop flight of any kind across the Pacific Ocean.
- August 18
  - The Imperial Ethiopian Air Force receives its first aircraft, a Potez 25-A2.
  - The Women's Air Derby, the first official women's air race in the United States — referred to as the "Powder Puff Derby" by humorist Will Rogers, which becomes the popular name for it — gets under way with 20 women competing in two divisions (for heavy and light aircraft). Competitors include Australian Jessie Miller, German Thea Rasche, and Americans Pancho Barnes, Marvel Crosson, Amelia Earhart, Ruth Elder, Edith Foltz, Mary Haizlip, Opal Kunz, Ruth Nichols, Blanche Noyes, Phoebe Omlie, Neva Paris, Louise Thaden, and Bobbi Trout. Nineteen pilots take off from Clover Field in Santa Monica, California, headed for Cleveland, Ohio, and a twentieth leaves the following day. Competitors are limited to using airplanes with engine power that the race's organizers consider "appropriate for a woman;" Opal Kunz's 300 hp (224 kW) Travel Air is declared "too fast for a woman to fly" — even though she owns and flies it — forcing her to find a less powerful aircraft for the race.
- August 19
  - The ZMC-2 flies for the first time. Constructed at Naval Air Station Grosse Ile, Michigan, by The Aircraft Development Corporation of Detroit (later renamed the Detroit Aircraft Corporation), it will be the only successfully operated metal-skinned airship ever built, completing 752 flights and logging 2,265 hours of flight time in nearly 12 years of United States Navy service at Naval Air Station Lakehurst, New Jersey before it is retired and scrapped in 1941.
  - During Marvel Crosson's flight from Yuma to Phoenix, Arizona, on the second day of the Women's Air Derby, her Travel Air Model 11 goes into an tailspin at an altitude of about 1,000 feet (305 meters) crashes in a thick growth of cottonwood in the Gila River Valley about 6 miles (10 km) from Wellton, Arizona. Her badly battered body is found 300 feet (91 meters) from the wreck of her plane, indicating that she had jumped from the plane. She had pulled her parachute's rip cord, but either her parachute had failed to open or she had jumped at too low an altitude for it to have time to open.
- August 26 – The Women's Air Derby concludes with the competitors' arrival at Cleveland, Ohio, greeted by an estimated 18,000 spectators. In nine days of flying, starting from Santa Monica, California, they have made stops at San Bernardino, California; Yuma, Phoenix, and Douglas, Arizona; El Paso, Pecos, Midland, Abilene, and Fort Worth, Texas; St. Louis, Missouri; and Cincinnati, Ohio. Ten of the 14 pilots competing in the heavy airplane division (those with engines from 510 to 875 cubic inches [8,357 to 14,339] cm^{3}]) finish the race, as do four of the six competing in the light airplane class (those with engines of 275 to 510 cubic inches [4,506 to 8,357 cm^{3}]). Louise Thaden finishes first and wins the heavy airplane competition with a time of 20 hours 19 minutes 4 seconds. Phoebe Omlie wins the light airplane competition with a time of 25 hours, 12 minutes 47.5 seconds.
- August 29 – While Mary, Lady Heath, practices for the National Air Races in Cleveland, Ohio, the aircraft she is piloting clips a chimney and crashes through a factory roof. She spends weeks in a coma, but recovers from her injuries.

=== September ===
- September 3 – The Transcontinental Air Transport Ford 5-AT-B Trimotor City of San Francisco (registration NC9649) strikes Mount Taylor near Grants, New Mexico, during a thunderstorm while on a scheduled passenger flight from Albuquerque Airport in New Mexico to Los Angeles, killing all eight people on board.
- September 6
  - The Imperial Airways de Havilland DH.66 Hercules G-EBMZ stalls when it flares too early while attempting a night landing at Jask Airport in Jask, Persia. It crashes and bursts into flames when its wing fuel tanks rupture and emergency flares in its wingtips ignite the fuel. Both crew members and one of the three passengers die. The deceased pilot, A. E. Woodbridge, had shot down and wounded the German fighter ace Manfred von Richthofen during World War I.
  - The 1929 Schneider Trophy race is flown at Calshot Spit in the United Kingdom. Royal Air Force Flying Officer Henry Waghorn wins in a Supermarine S.6 at an average speed of 528.9 km/h (328.6 mph).
  - Flying the Wright XF3W-1 Apache equipped with floats, United States Navy Lieutenant Apollo Soucek sets a world altitude record for seaplanes, climbing to 38,500 feet (11,700 meters).
- September 11 – Guatemala establishes the Dirección General de Aeronáutica Civil ("General Directorate of Civil Aeronautics") as its national civil aviation authority.
- September 12 – The Italian Fascist leader Italo Balbo becomes Italy's Minister of the Air Force.
- September 24 – Flying from Mitchel Field on Long Island, New York, United States Army Air Corps Lieutenant Jimmy Doolittle — flying in a Consolidated NY-2 with a hooded cockpit and accompanied by a check pilot who can intervene in case of an emergency — becomes the first pilot to use only instrument guidance to take off, fly a set course, and land. He receives directional guidance from a radio range course aligned with the airport runway, uses radio marker beacons to indicate his distance from the runway and a sensitive altimeter to determine his altitude, and controls the attitude of his airplane with guidance from a directional gyroscope and an artificial horizon. He returns to Mitchell Field after flying along a 15-mile (24 km) course. The flight is part of research Doolittle is conducting for the Daniel Guggenheim Fund for the Promotion of Aeronautics.
- September 27–29 – Dieudonné Costes and Maurice Bellonte set a new world distance record, flying 7,905 km (4,912 mi) from Le Bourget in Paris, to Qiqihar, China, in a Breguet 19.
- September 30 – Fritz von Opel pilots the rocket-powered RAK.1 aircraft on a 75-second, 1.6-kilometre (1-mile) flight near Frankfurt-am-Main, Germany.

=== October ===
- October 1
  - The U.S. Federal Radio Commission allocates radio frequencies to clear the way for air transport companies to develop a communications network in the United States that supplements the United States Government's radio facilities. As a result, by the end of 1929 some major air transport lines will be maintaining two-way voice communication with their planes in flight.
  - The United States Department of Commerce's Aeronautics Branch issues a set of "Uniform Field Rules" for air traffic control that it recommends for adoption by states, counties, cities, and other entities operating airports in the United States.
- October 5 – The fifth Ford National Reliability Air Tour begins at Ford Airport in Dearborn, Michigan. Of the 35 entrants, 29 actually start. The tour cross-markets Ford Motor Company and its Stout Metal Airplane Division and showcases Henry Ford's interest in aviation.
- October 6 – Inter-Island Airways – the future Hawaiian Airlines – begins operations.
- October 7 – The Kingdom of Yugoslavia′s flag carrier, Aeroput, makes its first international flight, flown by a Potez 29/2 from Belgrade, Yugoslavia, to Vienna, Austria, via Zagreb, Yugoslavia, with five passengers on board.
- October 10 – The U.S. Department of Commerce's Aeronautics Branch inaugurates a position-reporting service for planes flying along U.S. Government airways.
- October 14 – The British airship R101 makes its first flight. It takes off from Cardington, Bedfordshire, and flies over London.
- October 17 – Denver Municipal Airport – the future Stapleton International Airport – opens in Denver, Colorado. It will serve as Denver's primary airport until it closes in February 1995.
- October 20 – The airfield at Naval Air Station Glenview, located in Glenview, Illinois, is dedicated, and its hangar deemed the largest in the world.
- October 21 – The fifth Ford National Reliability Tour concludes with the return of the contestants to Dearborn. Participants have flown a 5,017-mile (4,360 nmi; 8,074 km) route that included the air tour's first stops outside the United States. After departing Dearborn, contestants had flown into Canada and stopped at Windsor, Toronto, and Ottawa in Ontario and at Montreal in Quebec. They then had returned to the United States, stopping at Portland, Maine; Springfield, Massachusetts; New York City; Philadelphia, Pennsylvania; Baltimore, Maryland; Richmond, Virginia; Winston-Salem, North Carolina; Greenville, South Carolina; Augusta, Georgia; Jacksonville, Florida; Macon and Atlanta, Georgia; Nashville, Tennessee; Cincinnati, Ohio; Louisville, Kentucky; St. Louis and Springfield, Missouri; Wichita, Kansas; St. Joseph, Missouri; Des Moines and Cedar Rapids, Iowa; St. Paul, Minnesota; Wausau and Milwaukee, Wisconsin; Moline and Chicago, Illinois; and Kalamazoo, Michigan. John Livingston wins, flying the 5,107-mile (4,438 nmi; 8,219 km) route averaging 129.97 mph (209.17 km/h) in a Waco. Art Davis, also flying a Waco, places second.
- October 26 – During a scheduled passenger flight from Naples International Airport in Naples, Italy, to Genoa Cristoforo Colombo Airport outside Genoa, Italy, the Imperial Airways Short S.8/1 Calcutta flying boat City of Rome (registration G-AADN) makes a forced landing in high winds and poor weather in the Ligurian Sea off La Spezia, Italy. It sinks during efforts to tow it to shore, killing all seven people on board.
- October 29 – Colonial Flying Service and the Scully Walton Ambulance Company of New York City inaugurate an air ambulance service.

=== November ===
- November 6 – After taking off from Croydon Airport in London with nine people aboard for a scheduled passenger flight to Amsterdam, the Deutsche Luft Hansa Junkers G 24bi Oberschlesien (registration D-903) crashes after striking trees on a hill in Marden Park, Surrey, while attempting to return to Croydon in thick fog. Three of the four crew members and four of the five passengers die.
- November 9 – Flying from an airfield in the Territory of Alaska, American aviation pioneer Carl Ben Eielson and his mechanic Earl Borland die in the crash during a storm of their plane in Siberia while attempting to evacuate furs and personnel from the Nanuk, a cargo ship trapped in the ice at North Cape (now Mys Shmidta).
- November 23 – Novice German aviator Friedrich Karl von Koenig-Warthausen arrives in Hanover, Germany, in a Klemm Daimler L.20B, completing a 15-month around-world-journey that had begun at Berlin Tempelhof Airport in Berlin on August 1928. Originally intending to fly only to Moscow, he had continually extended his journey, flying on to the Persian Gulf, across northern India and to Siam, then continued mostly by ship to China, Japan, and across the Pacific Ocean before flying across the United States and Ontario, Canada, then taking a ship to Europe and finally flying to Hanover. Although his 15-month trip includes segments traveled by ship, he flies about 20,000 miles (17,000 nmi; 32,000 km) and spends 450 hours in the air, and he is recognized as the first person to complete a solo flight around the world largely by airplane.
- November 25 – The Spanish government airline CLASSA officially begins operation of all lines previously operated by the airlines that merged to form it, including Iberia.
- November 26 – After taking off from Hal Far, Malta, a Fleet Air Arm of the Royal Air Force Fairey Flycatcher lands aboard the British aircraft carrier HMS Courageous, achieving the first night carrier landing by a fleet fighter.
- November 28–29 – Richard E. Byrd and crew take off from their base at Little America on the Ross Ice Shelf in Antarctica in a Ford Trimotor and make the first flight over the South Pole, dumping several bags of food and supplies overboard to gain enough altitude to climb over the Queen Maud Mountains. They return to Little America after a round-trip flight of 1,600 miles (2,575 kilometers) that lasts 17 hours 26 minutes. Byrd becomes the first person to fly over both the North Pole (which he had done in May 1926) and the South Pole.

=== December ===
- December 2 – Fifteen air carriers set up Aeronautical Radio, Inc. (ARINC), a not-for-profit organization which uses a common network of ground stations to serve as the single coordinator of aeronautical communications for the air transport industry in the United States.
- December 16
  - The British airship R100 makes its first flight, from Howden to Cardington, England.
  - Tydeo Larre Borges is the first South American pilot to cross the South Atlantic Ocean.
- December 17 – Royal Air Force Captain Arthur G. Jones-Williams and Lieutenant Norman H. Jenkins set out from RAF Cranwell in England in the Fairey Long-Range Monoplane to set a new nonstop flight distance record by flying to South Africa. The flight ends in tragedy later in the day when their plane crashes into Mount Sainte Marie du Zit in the Atlas Mountains in French Tunisia at an altitude of 2,300 feet (700 meters) after 13 hours 40 minutes in the air, killing both of them.
- December 20
  - Will Kirk Kaynor, a member of the United States House of Representatives representing the 2nd Congressional District of Massachusetts, dies in the crash of a United States Army Air Corps plane at Bolling Field in Washington, D.C. It was his first time in an airplane.
  - Pan American Airways (the future Pan American World Airways) places orders for the Sikorsky S-40, a large, four-engined flying boat. These will become the first airplanes that Pan American christens with the name "Clipper," the subsequent trademark name of the airline's planes.

== First flights ==
- Aeronca C-2
- Avia BH-11 (Czechoslovak air arm designation Avia B.11)
- Bellanca CH-300 Pacemaker
- Bellanca TES
- Cessna DC-6
- Cierva C.12
- Cierva C.19
- Curtiss Thrush
- Fairchild FB-3
- Farman F.200
- FBA 270
- Hall XFH
- Heinkel HD 56, prototype of the Aichi E3A
- Levasseur PL.14
- Macchi M.67
- Piaggio P.9
- Pitcairn PA-7
- Potez 36
- Southern Martlet
- Verville Air Coach
- Early 1929
  - Thomas-Morse XP-13 Viper
  - Westland Interceptor
- Spring 1929 – Levasseur PL.10

=== January ===
- Gloster Gauntlet
- January 27 – Saunders A.10

=== February ===
- February 1 – Lublin R-X
- February 13 – Junkers A50
- February 22 – Westland IV, prototype of the Westland Wessex trimotor airliner

=== April ===
- April 3 – Cunningham-Hall PT-6
- April 11 – Boeing P-12

=== May ===
- Pietenpol Air Camper homebuilt aircraft prototype, with Ford Model A engine
- Polikarpov DI-2
- May 3 – Gee Bee Model A
- May 17 – Martin XT5M-1, prototype of the Martin BM

=== June ===
- June 11 – Vickers Type 143
- June 21 – Vought XF2U-1

=== July ===
- Bernard 20
- Fokker D.XVI
- RWD-2
- July 4 – Saro A17 Cutty Sark
- July 7 – Marinens Flyvebaatfabrikk M.F.10
- July 29 – Dornier Do X

=== August ===
- Bernard 60 T
- Bernard H.V.41
- PZL P.1
- August 19 – Detroit ZMC-2

=== September ===
- Avro 621 Tutor
- September 9 – De Havilland Puss Moth
- September 11 – Tupolev R-6
- September 15 – Junkers K 47
- September 17 – Adcox Student Prince

=== October ===
- Berliner-Joyce XP-16, prototype of the Berliner-Joyce P-16 (later PB-1)
- October 2 – Acme Sportsman
- October 14 – Airship R101

=== November ===
- November 6 – Junkers G.38
- November 26 – Vickers Type 177

=== December ===
- Dewoitine D.26
- Hall XPH-1, prototype of the Hall PH
- Nakajima A2N
- December 16 – R100
- December 28 – Mitsubishi B2M

== Entered service ==
- Bernard 190T with CIDNA
- Butler Blackhawk
- Consolidated NY-3 with the United States Navy
- Curtiss P-6 Hawk with the 27th Pursuit Squadron, United States Army Air Corps
- Nakajima A1N with the Imperial Japanese Navy
- Polikarpov I-3 with 4th and 7th Fighter Squadrons, Red Air Force
- Polikarpov U-2, later redesignated Polikarpov Po-2 (NATO reporting name "Mule")
- Tupolev TB-1 with the VVS

=== February ===
- February 27 – Boeing P-12 with the United States Army Air Corps

=== May ===
- Bristol Bulldog with No. 3 Squadron, Royal Air Force

=== June ===
- Boeing F4B with the United States Navy

=== October ===
- Handley Page Hinaidi with the Royal Air Force

== Retirements ==
- Avro 555 Bison by the Royal Air Force
- Fairey Fawn by the Royal Auxiliary Air Force and Special Reserve squadrons
- Latécoère 15 by Lignes Aériennes Latécoère
- Saunders A.3 Valkyrie
- Saunders A.4 Medina
