= Thaden T-4 =

T-4 Argonaut
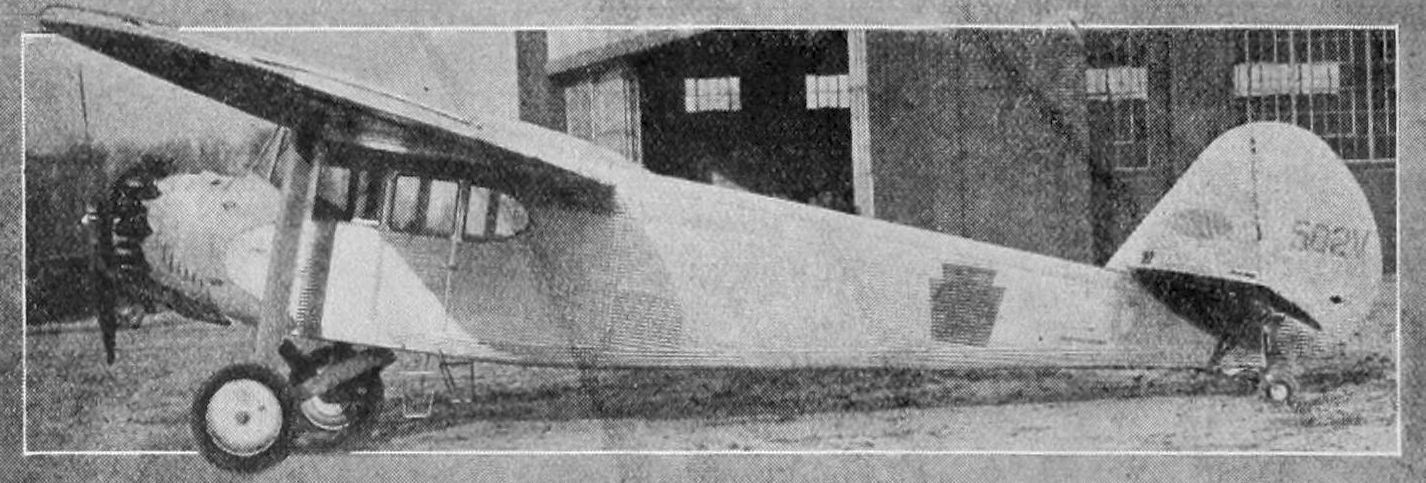

General information
- Type: Cabin monoplane
- National origin: United States
- Manufacturer: Thaden Metal Aircraft Company
- Designer: Louise Thaden & Herbert von Thaden
- Number built: 2

History
- First flight: 1930

The Thaden T-4 Argonaut was a 1930s American four-seat all-metal cabin monoplane built by the Thaden Metal Aircraft Company of San Francisco, California.

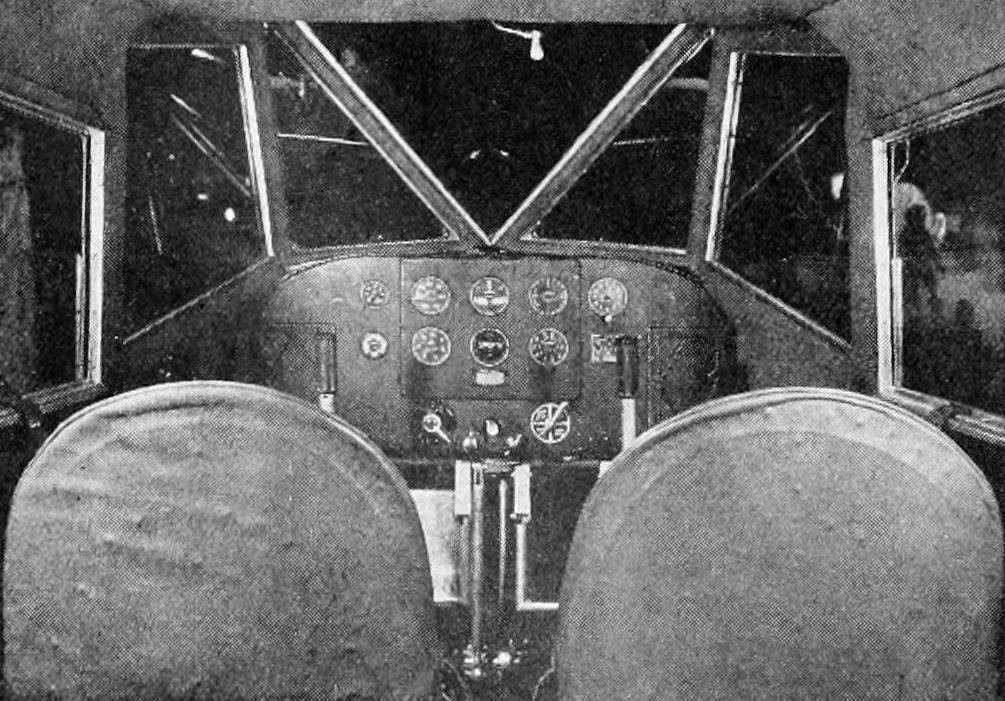
The T-4 cockpit

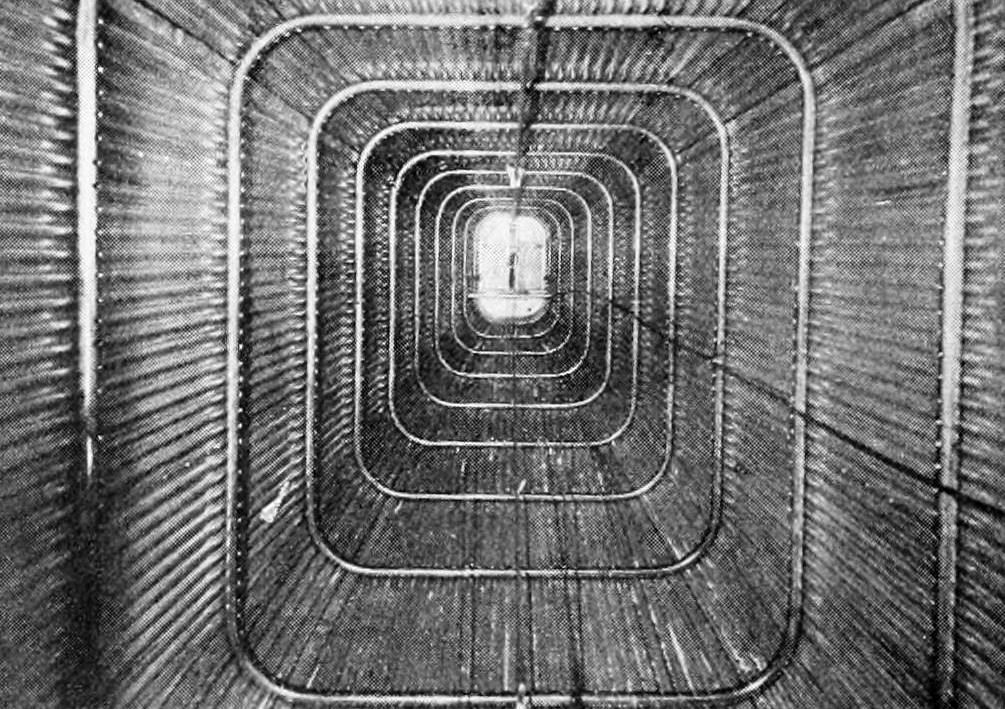
Inside the rear fuselage of a Thaden T-4

== Design and development ==
The T-4 was the third and last design of the Thaden Metal Aircraft Company which had been formed by Herbert von Thaden, a former United States Army Signal Corps pilot and engineer, to work on developing the first American all-metal aircraft. The T-4 was a high-wing monoplane powered by a 300 hp (224 kW) Wright Whirlwind radial engine. It had a fixed conventional landing gear with a tailwheel. Two aircraft were built.

== Specifications ==
Data from Jane's all the World's Aircraft 1931, Aerofiles

General characteristics

- Crew: 1
- Capacity: 3 pax
- Length: 32 ft 10 in (10.01 m)
- Wingspan: 45 ft (14 m)
- Height: 9 ft (2.7 m)
- Wing area: 277.4 sq ft (25.77 m^{2})
- Empty weight: 2,366 lb (1,073 kg)
- Gross weight: 3,800 lb (1,724 kg)
- Fuel capacity: 96 US gal (80 imp gal; 360 L) fuel tank capacity; 636 lb (288 kg) fuel and oil
- Powerplant: 1 × Wright Whirlwind 9-cylinder air-cooled radial piston engine, 300 hp (220 kW)
- Propellers: 2-bladed Hamilton Standard fixed-pitch metal propeller

Performance

- Maximum speed: 135 mph (217 km/h, 117 kn)
- Cruise speed: 110 mph (180 km/h, 96 kn) *Landing speed: 59 mph (51 kn; 95 km/h)
- Range: 600 mi (970 km, 520 nmi)
- Rate of climb: 920 ft/min (4.7 m/s)
- Wing loading: 13.88 lb/sq ft (67.8 kg/m^{2})
- Power/mass: 12.67 lb/hp (7.71 kg/kW)

== See also ==
- Thaden T-1
- Thaden T-2
