= KVBT =

KVBT may refer to:

- KVBT-LD, a low-power television station (channel 26, virtual 13) licensed to Santa Clara, etc., Utah, United States
- Bentonville Municipal Airport in Bentonville, Arkansas (ICAO code KVBT)
