= Thaden T-1 =

Thaden T-1 Argonaut
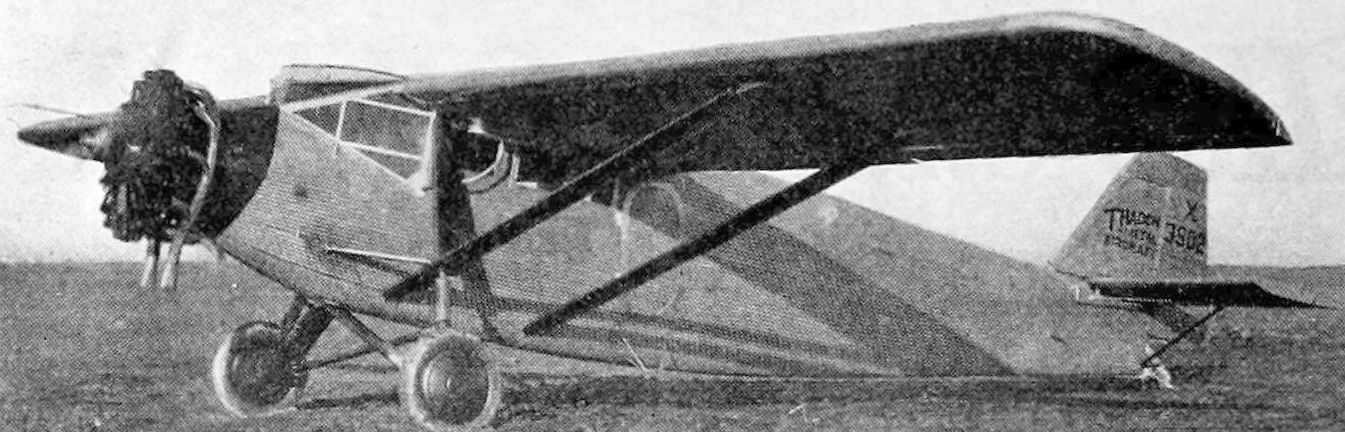

General information
- Type: Cabin monoplane
- National origin: United States
- Manufacturer: Thaden Metal Aircraft Company
- Designer: Herbert von Thaden
- Number built: 1

History
- First flight: 15 January 1928

The Thaden T-1 Argonaut was a 1920s American eight-seat all-metal cabin monoplane, built by the Thaden Metal Aircraft Company of San Francisco, California.

== Description and history ==
The Thaden T-1 was a high-wing strut-braced monoplane, constructed of corrugated aluminum, and powered by a 425 hp (317 kW) Pratt & Whitney Wasp radial engine. It had a fixed conventional landing gear with a tailskid. Only one example was built (X3902); its first flight was on 15 January 1928, and its final flight ended in 1933 in a crash in Alaska. In 1986, the wrecked fuselage was recovered, and is now on display at the Hiller Aviation Museum in San Carlos, California.

== Specifications ==
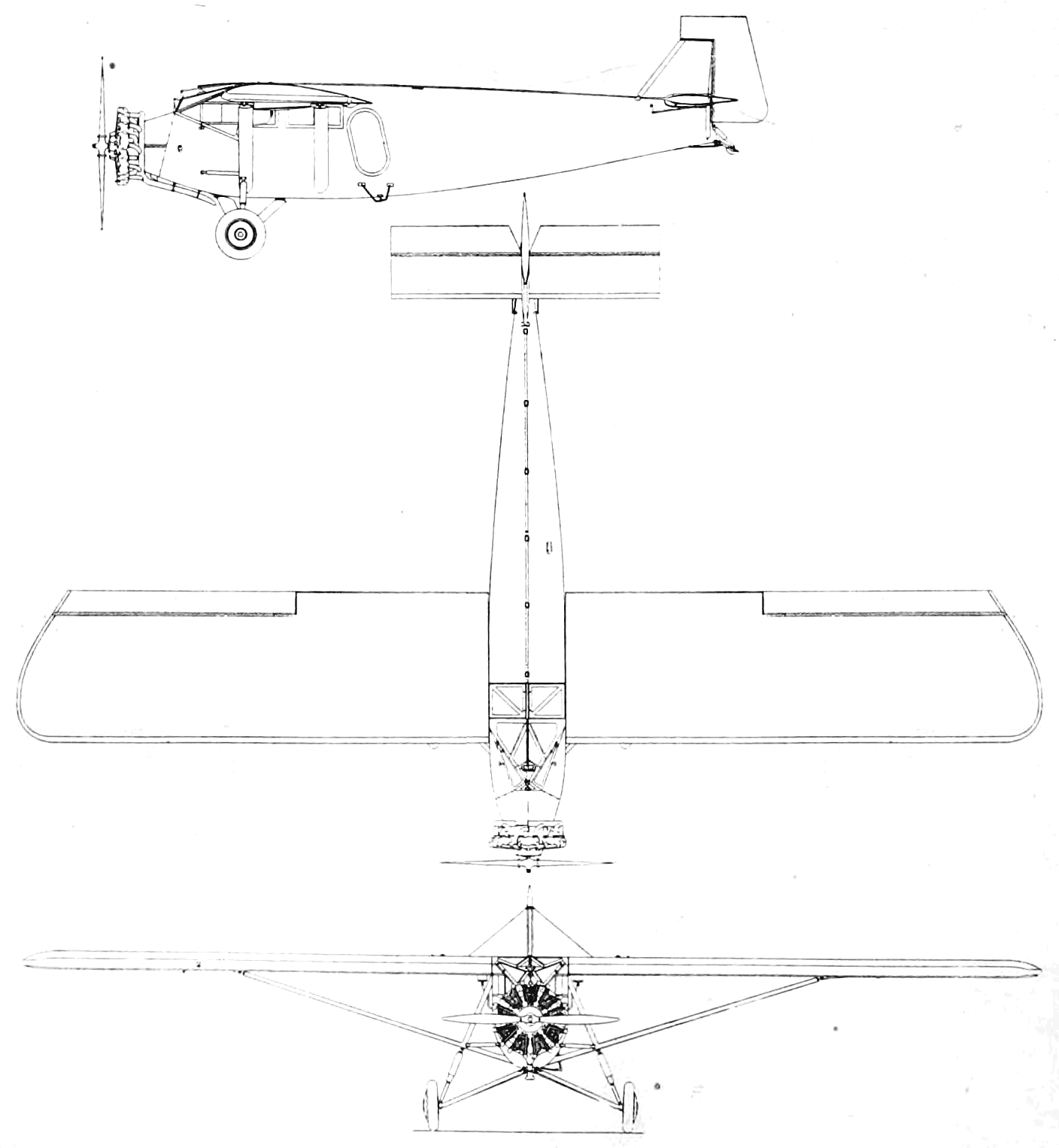
Thaden T-1 Argonaut 3-view drawing from Aero Digest March 1928

Data from aerofiles.com

General characteristics

- Capacity: 8
- Length: 10.75 m (35 ft 3 in)
- Wingspan: 16.16 m (53 ft 0 in)
- Powerplant: 1 × Pratt & Whitney Wasp radial piston engine, 317 kW (425 hp)

Performance

- Maximum speed: 217 km/h (135 mph, 117 kn)

== See also ==
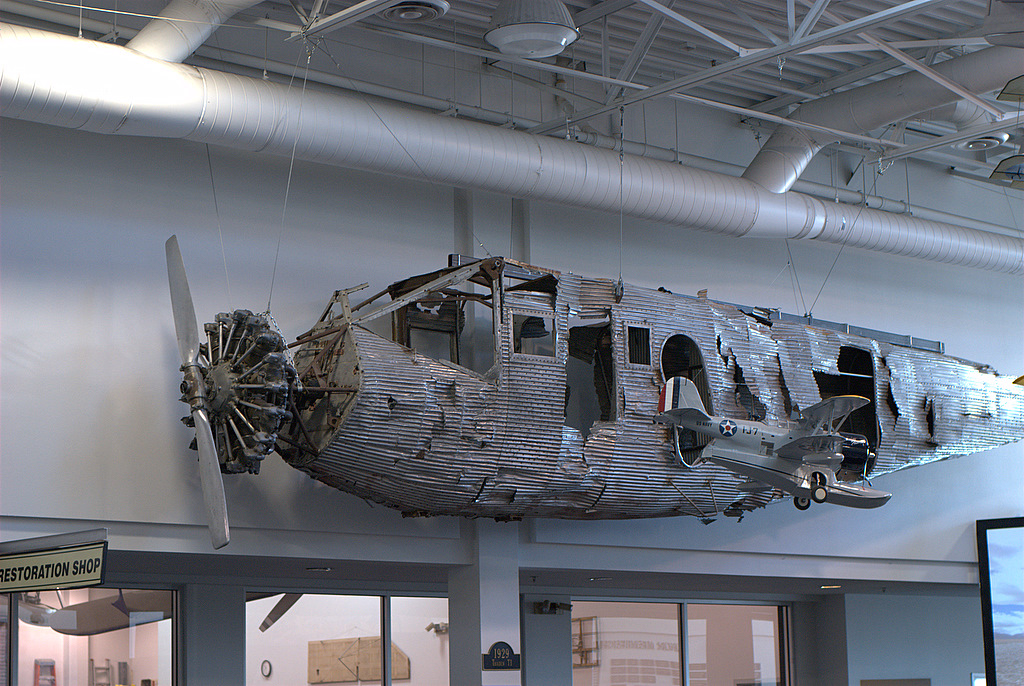
Wreckage of the Thaden T-1 at the Hiller Aviation Museum

- Thaden T-2
- Thaden T-4
