= Bill Lancaster (aviator) =

British aviation pioneer (1898–1933)

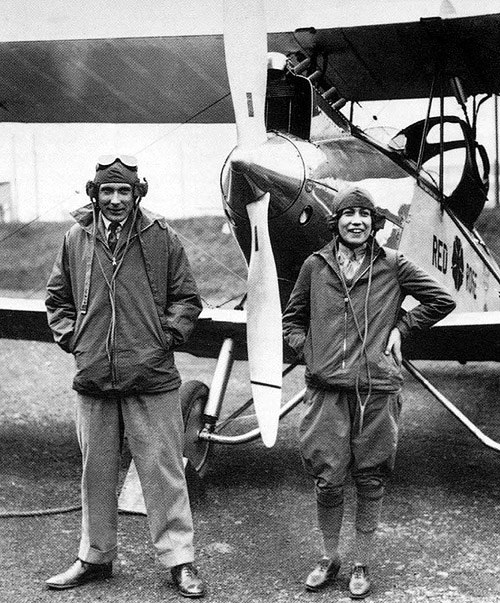
- Bill Lancaster and Chubbie Miller stand in front of the Red Rose in 1928.
- Born: 14 February 1898; Birmingham, England
- Died: 20 April 1933 (aged 35); Tanezrouft, Algeria
- Occupation: Aviator

Captain William Newton Lancaster (14 February 1898 – 20 April 1933) was a pioneering British aviator.

== Early life ==
Born in Birmingham, England, Lancaster emigrated to Australia prior to World War I. In 1916, he joined first the Australian Army and later the Australian Flying Corps. He remained in Britain after the war and joined the Royal Air Force, marrying Annie Maude Besant in 1919 and serving in India during the 1920s. He was promoted to flying officer from pilot officer on 30 April 1921.

== England to Australia ==
In 1927, Lancaster transferred to the RAF Reserve (he continued to hold a commission until 30 April 1930), and decided to make a name for himself by flying from England to Australia. He made this flight in the Avro Avian Red Rose, accompanied by Australian Jessie "Chubbie" Miller, who helped finance the flight. It was at the time one of the longest flights made in such a small aircraft—although they were overtaken en route by Bert Hinkler in another Avian—and the first England–Australia flight by a woman. A huge crowd greeted them on arrival in Darwin, and on their subsequent tour around Australia.

In 1928 Lancaster and Miller moved to the United States on the promise of a Hollywood movie which was never made. Lancaster then made a living selling British aero engines, and Miller became an aviator in her own right, competing in the famous "Powder Puff Derby" of 1929.

== Murder trial ==
In 1932, Lancaster had been in Mexico looking for work. At the same time, Haden Clarke, a male American writer, had been living in Lancaster and Miller's Florida home in order to assist Miller's writing of her autobiography. Clarke and Miller had developed a relationship in Lancaster's absence, and Clarke convinced Miller to leave Lancaster and marry him instead. Upon receipt of this news, Lancaster returned promptly to Florida.

On 20 April, Clarke was killed by a gunshot wound to the head. Although the gun was Lancaster's, and he admitted forging suicide notes found at the scene (one addressed to Lancaster and another to Miller), forensic evidence provided by the prosecution was confusing to the jury.

Albert H. Hamilton, a criminologist with a somewhat dubious past, provided easy-to-understand testimony in Lancaster's favour. Additionally, even though Lancaster and Miller had dissolved their romance and partnership, Miller spoke in Lancaster's defence and the trial judge gave a summing up in his favour.

Lancaster was acquitted of murder after 5 hours of deliberation. It is regarded that although the evidence was in doubt, a main factor in Lancaster's acquittal was his calm, straightforward, gentlemanly demeanor in the courtroom; and the portrayal of the victim as depressive, drug-addicted and suicidal. Public opinion may also have played its part in influencing the jury; indeed, at one point the behaviour of those in gallery became so unruly (cheering for Lancaster), that Judge Atkinson interrupted with a firm, "This is not a vaudeville show!"

== Final flight ==
After the trial, Lancaster and Miller returned to England. Broke and friendless, Lancaster decided to attempt the hotly contested England-to-South Africa speed record. Purchasing the Avro Avian Southern Cross Minor from Charles Kingsford Smith, he departed England on 11 April 1933. As the Avian was considerably slower than other aircraft of the time, Lancaster would have to make short stops and get little sleep to have any hope of achieving the record.

Having got lost several times, having not slept for 30 hours and being ten hours behind his intended time, Lancaster departed from Reggane on the evening of 12 April to make a 750 mi (1,210 km) night crossing of the Sahara. The Avian's engine failed after less than an hour's flying, and he crash-landed in the desert far north of his expected flight path. Relatively uninjured and occasionally firing flares he awaited rescue. Searches by aircraft, however, were too far to the south, and a car searching from Reggane was also unsuccessful. He died eight days later, on 20 April 1933, exactly one year after Clarke's death. His final message, written on a fuel card on the morning of the 20th, was "So the beginning of the eighth day has dawned. It is still cool. I have no water. I am waiting patiently. Come soon please. Fever wracked me last night. Hope you get my full log. Bill"

== Discovery ==
The crash site was discovered by French troops on 12 February 1962, approximately 170 miles south of Reggane in the Tanezrouft region. Lancaster's body had been mummified, and his diary and personal effects had survived intact. The diary was returned to Miller, who allowed it to be published.

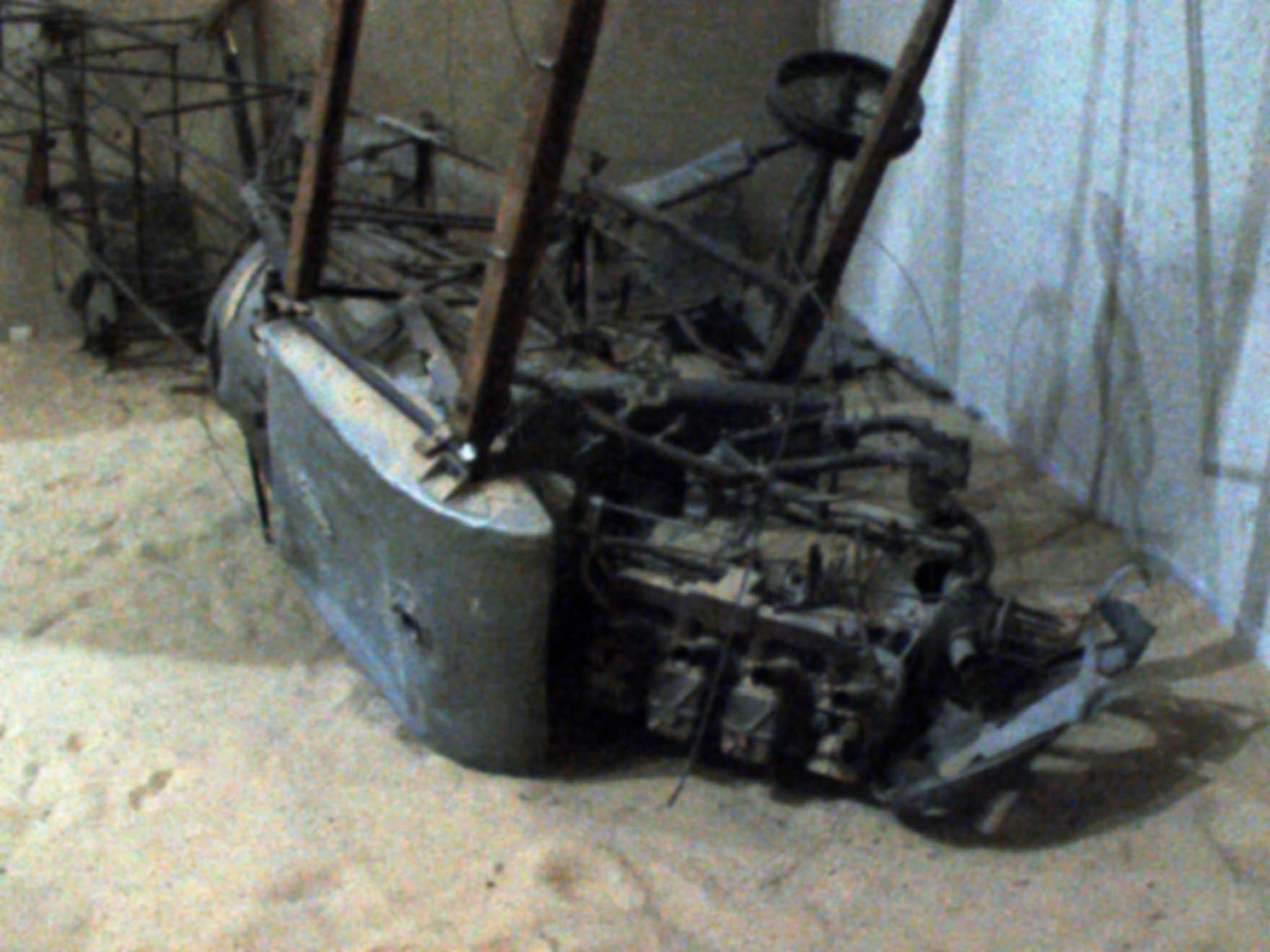
The wreckage of the Southern Cross Minor displayed at the Queensland Museum.

The wreck of the Southern Cross Minor was recovered in 1975. It now resides in the Queensland Museum in Brisbane but is held in storage and no longer on public display.
