= Relief Wings =

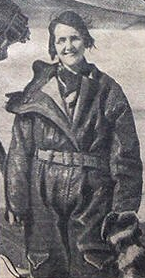
Ruth Nichols, founder of Relief Wings

Relief Wings was founded in 1940 by Ruth Rowland Nichols as a humanitarian air service for disaster relief. Consisting of private aircraft, volunteer medical professionals and a network of medical facilities, Relief Wings were able to contribute an effective air-ambulance service to the programme of civil defence. Relief Wings was organised and run by women, with women being eligible to participate in any of the roles available in the organisation. Chapters of Relief Wings were organised in 36 states of the US.

The slogan of Relief Wings was "Humanitarian Service by Air".

From 1942 Relief Wings assisted the civilian auxiliary of the United States Air Force, Civil Air Patrol (CAP), providing an adjunct relief service during World War II. By becoming an adjunct service to CAP, Ruth Nichols was able to get the appropriate military and aviation permissions for Relief Wings so that the wartime restrictions on private flying did not apply to the group. Nichols went on to earn her Lieutenant Colonel ranking due to her service with Relief Wings.
