= Thaden Metal Aircraft Company =

The Thaden Metal Aircraft Company was an American aircraft manufacturer based in San Francisco, California in the late 1920s.

== History ==
The company was founded by Herbert von Thaden in 1928 to design and build a series of all-metal cabin monoplanes.

In 1929 the company was renamed the Pittsburgh Metal Airplane Company when it was bought by the Pittsburgh Aviation Industries Corporation for $100,000. The company failed to break into the commercial market and collapsed, PAIC sold the company to the General Aviation Corporation in 1930 and it was renamed the Metalair Corporation.

== Aircraft ==
- Thaden T-1 (1928)
- Thaden T-2 (1928)
- Thaden T-4 (1930)

== See also ==
- Louise Thaden - Herbert Thaden's wife and a pioneer female aviator.
