= Ruth Rowland Nichols =

American aviator

- Ruth Nichols. At Brazilian National Archives
- Born: February 23, 1901; New York City, U.S.
- Died: September 25, 1960 (aged 59); New York City, U.S.
- Resting place: Woodlawn Cemetery
- Education: Wellesley College (1924)
- Parent(s): Erickson Norman Nichols; Edith Corlis Haines

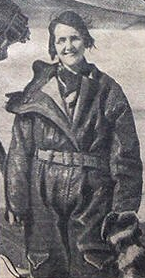
Nichols in 1932

Ruth Rowland Nichols (February 23, 1901 – September 25, 1960) was an American aviation pioneer. She is the only woman yet to hold simultaneous world records for speed, altitude, and distance for a female pilot.

== Biography ==
Nichols was born in New York City to Erickson Norman Nichols and Edith Corlis Haines. Her father was a member of the New York Stock Exchange, and had served with Teddy Roosevelt's Rough Riders (officially known as The 1st United States Volunteer Cavalry). Ruth was sent to the Masters School, a private preparatory school for young women. On her graduation from high school in 1919, her father's graduation present to her was an airplane ride with Eddie Stinson Jr., which spurred her interest in becoming a pilot. After her graduation from the Masters School, she attended Wellesley College, studied pre medical, and graduated in 1924.

=== Career as a pilot ===
While a student at Wellesley College, Nichols secretly took flying lessons. Shortly after graduation, she received her pilot's license, and became the first woman in the world to obtain a hydroplane license. She first achieved public fame in January 1928 as co-pilot for Harry Rogers, who had been her flying instructor, on the first non-stop flight from New York to Miami, Florida. Due to her socialite upbringing and aristocratic family background, Nichols became known in the press as the "Flying Debutante", a name she hated. Nichols was then hired as a sales manager for Fairchild Aviation Corporation. In 1929, she was a founding member, with Amelia Earhart and others, of the Ninety-Nines, an organization of licensed women pilots. In August 1929, she and Earhart were among 20 competitors in the Women's Air Derby (also known as the "Powder Puff Derby"), the first official women-only air race in the United States. They departed from Santa Monica, California, on 18 August for Cleveland, Ohio. Nichols crashed, Louise Thaden won, while Earhart finished third in the heavy class.

During the 1930s, while working for Fairchild and other aviation companies, Nichols made several record-setting flights, most of them in a Lockheed Electra, the New Cincinnati, on open loan from millionaire radio industrialist Powel Crosley Jr. In December 1930, she beat Charles Lindbergh's record time for a cross-country flight, completing the trip in 13 hours, 21 minutes. In March, 1931, she set the women's world altitude record of 28,743 feet (8760.9 m). In April 1931 in Detroit, she set the women's world speed record of 210.7 miles per hour (339.1 km/h). In June, 1931, she attempted to become the first woman to fly solo across the Atlantic Ocean, but crashed in New Brunswick and was severely injured, breaking at least two vertebrae in her back. Following her recovery, in October, 1931, she set the women's distance record with a flight from Oakland, California, to Louisville, Kentucky, 1,977 miles (3182 km).

On 14 February 1932, Nichols set a new world altitude record of 19,928 feet for diesel-powered aircraft at Floyd Bennett Field in Brooklyn, New York, while flying in a Lockheed Vega. On 3 November, an attempt at breaking Earhart's transcontinental record failed when Nichols' aircraft skidded off the runway at Floyd Bennett Field while taxiing, went into a ground loop, and was badly damaged as the port wing dug in, although the pilot escaped injury. On 29 December, Nichols became the first woman pilot of a commercial passenger airline, flying for New York and New England Airways. In 1935, Nichols joined the British-based Women's Engineering Society, at the time the only organisation in the world for women engineers and pilots.

On 21 October 1935, Nichols was critically injured in a crash during a private flight in Troy, New York. The flight was to be an airborne wedding for two couples over New York City, but the plane, a Curtiss Condor, registration NC725K, crashed shortly after takeoff, killing the pilot. Nichols received a broken left wrist, ankle and nose, contusions, burns and "possible internal injuries", according to newspaper accounts of the crash. She was unable to fly for nearly a year after. When she returned to flying, Nichols went to work for the Emergency Peace Campaign, a Quaker organization that sought to promote peaceful resolution to international conflicts then brewing. In 1939, she headed Relief Wings, a civilian air service that performed emergency relief flights and assisted the Civil Air Patrol during World War II. Nichols would eventually attain the rank of lieutenant colonel in the Civil Air Patrol.

Following the war, Nichols became involved in other humanitarian efforts, using her celebrity to bring attention to causes and to raise funds. She organised a mission of support for UNICEF, including piloting a round-the-world tour in 1949. During this tour, on August 14, she joined the crew of a Transocean Air Lines flight carrying 47 Italian immigrants on behalf of the International Refugee Organization to Caracas, Venezuela. During the flight, the plane accidentally overflew Shannon (a planned stopover) and, despite turning around, was forced to ditch in Galway Bay at 2:40 am the following morning. All but 8 of the 58 on board were rescued. In the 1950s, she served as director of women's activities for Save the Children, director of the women's division of the United Hospital Fund, and field director for the National Nephrosis Foundation.

In 1958, after lobbying the United States Air Force for permission, she co-piloted a TF-102A Delta Dagger and reached 1,000 miles per hour (1600 km/h) and an altitude of 51,000 feet (15 545 m), setting new women's speed and altitude records at age fifty-seven.

=== Women in space program ===
In 1959, as NASA's Mercury program was preparing for missions to the moon, Nichols underwent the same isolation, centrifuge, and weightlessness tests that had been devised for the astronaut candidates. The tests were conducted at the Wright Air Development Center in Dayton, Ohio, by USAF Brigadier General Don Flickinger. Flickinger, and his mentor Randy Lovelace (the bioastronautics pioneer who performed the medical selection of the Mercury Seven), had a far-reaching interest in research on the suitability of women as astronauts. However, no official records of the Air Research and Development Command, the experimental wing of the Air Force trying to get America into space, survive to document how or why this came about.

Although she didn't pass all the Phase 1 tests that her female peers did (the Mercury 13), Nichols performed well enough on the tests and urged Air Force scientists to include women in their spaceflight plans. The scientists at Wright "thought of this with horror, and they said under no circumstances," according to an oral historian to whom Nichols relayed the story. The test results were leaked to the media which, according to Flickinger, "turned the tide" against Air Force sponsorship of research into female astronaut candidates. Ultimately only Jerrie Cobb was able to complete all three phases of tests before NASA officially pulled the plug on the program.

=== Death ===
Suffering from severe depression, Nichols died of an overdose of barbiturates at her home in New York City on September 25, 1960. Her death was ruled a suicide. Nichols was interred at Woodlawn Cemetery in the Bronx, New York.

== Legacy ==
Fellow aviation pioneer Clarence Chamberlin said in 1930 that Nichols was "by far the best woman pilot in the [United States]". During the course of her career, Nichols flew every type of aircraft developed, including the dirigible, glider, autogyro, seaplanes, biplanes, triplanes, transport aircraft, and a supersonic jet. Nichols was posthumously inducted into the National Aviation Hall of Fame in 1992. A propeller from her 1930s Lockheed Vega is displayed in the National Air and Space Museum's Golden Age of Flight gallery.

== Sources ==
- Roger D. Launius (2000). "Nichols, Ruth Rowland". American National Biography Online.
- Mur Wolf. "Ruth Nichols". Wellesley College - Person of the Week. Archived from the original on 2006-09-01.
- D. Cochrane and P. Ramirez. "Ruth Nichols". National Air and Space Museum, Smithsonian Institution. Archived from the original on 2012-02-05.
- Jone Johnson Lewis. "Ruth Nichols". Women's History. Archived from the original on 2006-02-08.
