= Patty Willis =

American aviator (1910-1985)

Patricia Ann Willis (January 6, 1910 – August 1, 1985) was a pioneering American woman aviator.

== History ==
Willis was born in Moline, Illinois, and wanted to fly from an early age. She attended Belmont High School, and went to the School of Art in Los Angeles.

On 16 June 1929, at 19, she received her pilot's licence.

She wanted to enter the 1929 Women's Air Derby but was unable to obtain an aircraft.
