= Bentonville Municipal Airport =

Airport in Arkansas, United States

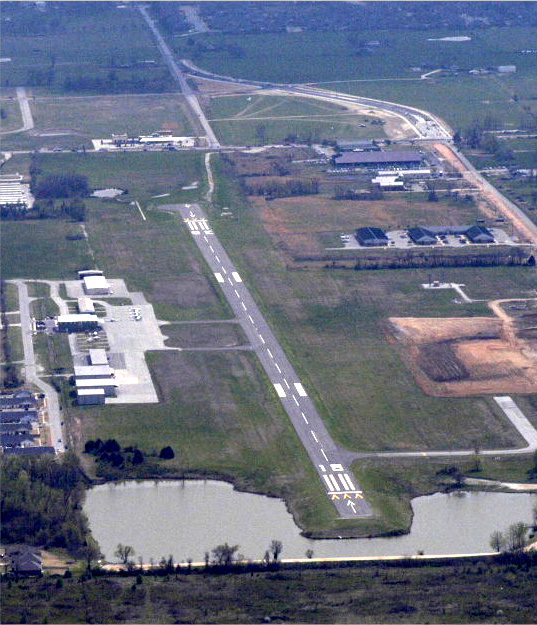
- IATA: none; ICAO: KVBT; FAA LID: VBT

Summary
- Airport type: Public
- Owner: City of Bentonville
- Serves: Bentonville, Arkansas
- Elevation AMSL: 1,296 ft (395 m)
- Coordinates: 36°20′45″N 094°13′10″W
- Interactive map of Bentonville Municipal Airport

Runways
Direction	Length		Surface
Direction	ft	m	Surface
18/36	4,082	1,244	Asphalt
17/35	2,400	732	Turf

Statistics (2009)
- Aircraft operations: 18,100
- Based aircraft: 40
- Source: Federal Aviation Administration

Bentonville Municipal Airport (ICAO: KVBT, FAA LID: VBT) is a city-owned, public-use airport located 2 nmi (3.7 km) south of the central business district of Bentonville, a city in Benton County, Arkansas, United States. It is also known as Louise M. Thaden Field or Louise Thaden Field, a name it was given in 1951 to honor Louise McPhetridge Thaden (1905–1979), an aviation pioneer from Bentonville.

This airport is included in the FAA's National Plan of Integrated Airport Systems for 2009–2013, which categorizes it as a general aviation facility.

Although most U.S. airports use the same three-letter location identifier for the FAA and IATA, Bentonville Municipal Airport is assigned VBT by the FAA but has no designation from the IATA.

== History ==
The airport was leased to O. W. Coda in 1956.

Consideration was given to relocating Lake Bentonville to extend the runway by 1,000 ft (300 m) in 2006.

The master plan for the airport was updated in 2016. Two years later, a major update of the airport was completed, including a new flight center, public meeting rooms, a museum, and a restaurant, "Louise", added to the northern border with Lake Bentonville.

== Facilities and aircraft ==
Bentonville Municipal Airport covers an area of 140 acres (57 ha) at an elevation of 1,296 feet (395 m) above mean sea level. It has one paved runway designated 18/36 with a surface measuring 4,426 by 65 feet (1,349 x 20 m) and one turf runway measuring 2,400 by 75 feet (732 x 23 m) designated 17/35, available for use in day VFR conditions.

For the 12-month period ending August 31, 2015, the airport had 32,300 aircraft operations, an average of 88 per day: 99.7% general aviation and 0.3% military. At that time there were 77 aircraft based at this airport: 87% single-engine, 7.8% multi-engine and 2.6% helicopter.

== See also ==
- List of airports in Arkansas
