= Thaden T-2 =

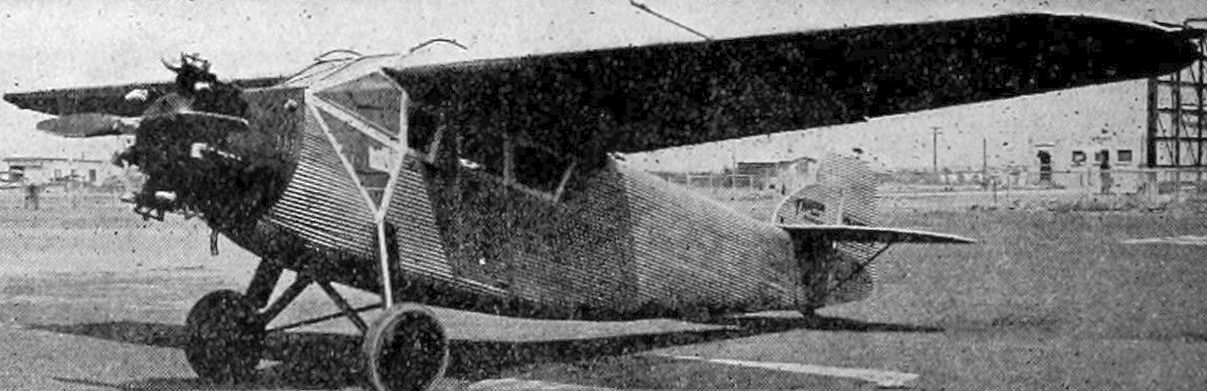

General information
- Type: Cabin monoplane
- National origin: United States
- Manufacturer: Thaden Metal Aircraft Company
- Designer: Herbert von Thaden
- Number built: 1

History
- First flight: 1928

The Thaden T-2 was a 1920s American four-seat all-metal cabin monoplane built by the Thaden Metal Aircraft Company of San Francisco, California, USA.

== Design and development ==
The Thaden Metal Aircraft Company was formed by Herbert von Thaden, a former United States Army Signal Corps pilot and engineer, to work on developing the first American all-metal aircraft. Following on from the strut-braced T-1 the T-2 was a smaller four-seat high-wing cantilever monoplane with flaps, powered by a 150 hp (112 kW) Comet radial engine.

== Specifications ==
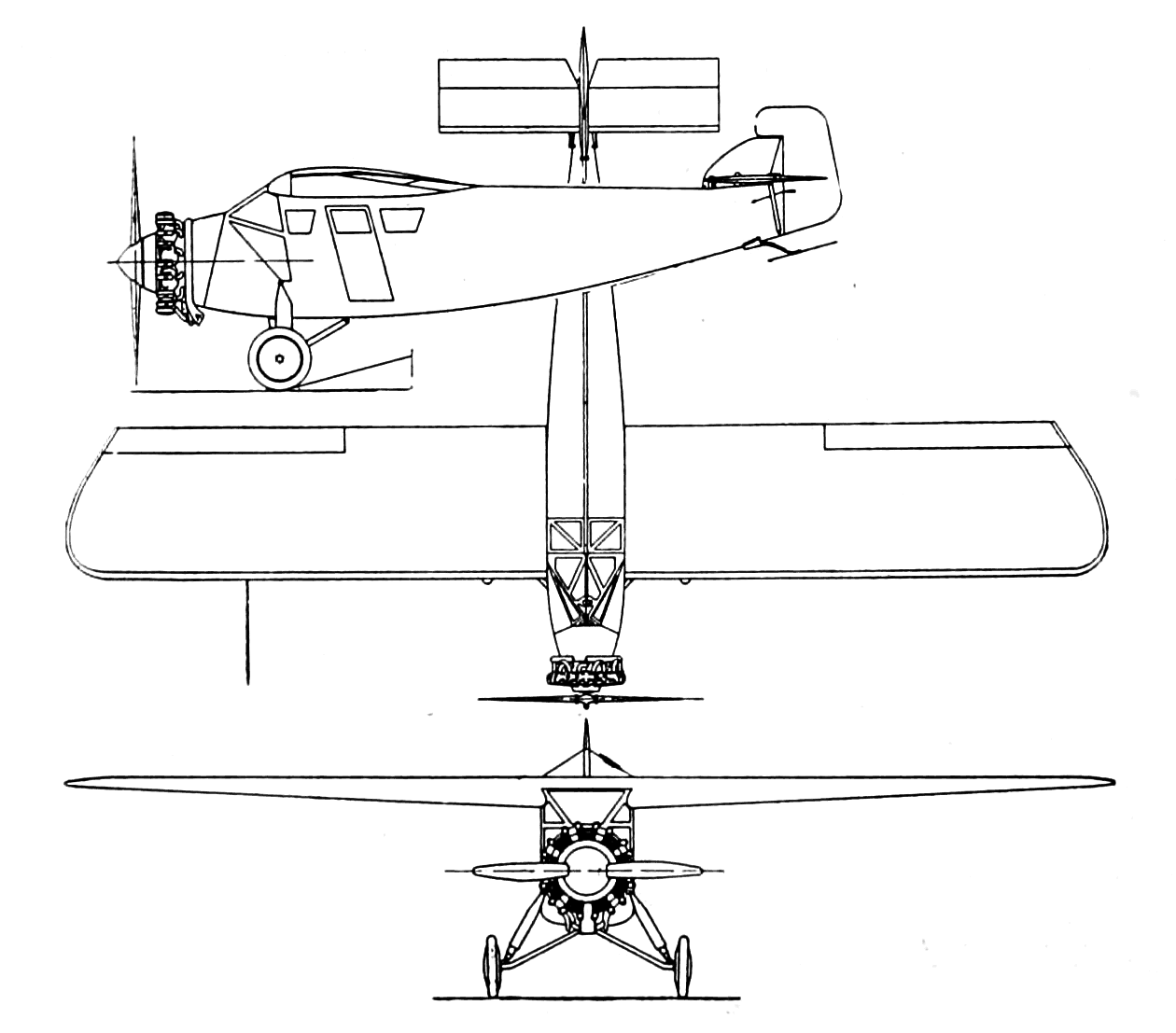
Thaden T-2 3-view drawing from Aero Digest August 1929

Data from Aero Digest August 1929

General characteristics

- Crew: one
- Capacity: two or three passengers
- Length: 24 ft 11 in (7.59 m)
- Wingspan: 39 ft (12 m)
- Height: 7 ft 9 in (2.36 m)
- Wing area: 225 sq ft (20.9 m^{2})
- Fuel capacity: 50 US gal (42 imp gal; 190 L)
- Powerplant: 1 × Comet 7-D 7 cylinder radial engine, 150 hp (110 kW) at 1,800 rpm
- Propellers: 2-bladed Westinghouse Micarta

Performance

- Maximum speed: 121 mph (195 km/h, 105 kn)
- Cruise speed: 100 mph (160 km/h, 87 kn)
- Service ceiling: 14,000 ft (4,300 m)
- Rate of climb: 800 ft/min (4.1 m/s)
- Landing speed, flaps down: 46 mph (74 km/h)

== See also ==
- Thaden T-1
- Thaden T-4
