= Jessie Miller =

Australian aviator (1901 - 1972)

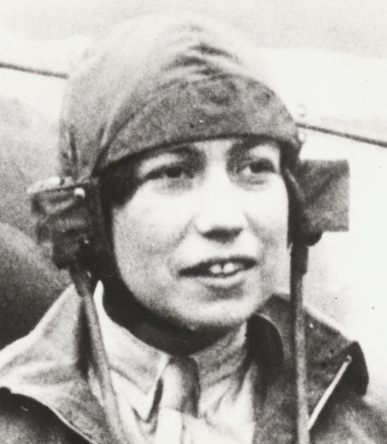
- Born: 1902
- Died: 1972 (aged 69–70)
- Aviation career
- Famous flights: First woman to complete an England-to-Australia flight Powder Puff Derby, 1929

Jessie Maude "Chubbie" Miller (1901 Western Australia – 1972, London, England) was a pioneering Australian aviator. In 1927, Miller became the first woman to complete an England-to-Australia flight when she flew with RAF pilot Bill Lancaster who was attempting to set a long distance flying record. Miller became an aviator in her own right, competing in the famous "Powder Puff Derby" of 1929. In 1930, she was presumed dead when her plane went down in a storm on route from Havana to Miami, however, Miller was able to land safely in the Bahamas. She came to public attention again when Lancaster was accused of killing Haden Clarke, a male American writer, for whom Miller had left him.

== Early life ==
Jessie Maude Beveridge was born in 1901 Southern Cross, Western Australia, the eldest of three children of Maude and Charles Beveridge, a bank manager. She married George Keith Miller in 1919 when she was 18.

== England to Australia ==
In 1927 while visiting London from her native Australia, Miller met, helped finance, and flew with Royal Air Force officer Bill Lancaster in his Avro Avian Red Rose, on an attempt to set a long distance flying record from England to Australia. At the time it was one of the longest flights made in such a small aircraft, although they were overtaken en route by Bert Hinkler in another Avian. Bad weather forced them down in Sumatra, but they continued on, and after 159 days she finally arrived as the first woman to complete an England-to-Australia flight. Although 24 hours late, a huge crowd greeted them on arrival in Darwin, and on their subsequent tour around Australia.

In 1928, Lancaster and Miller moved to the United States on the promise of a Hollywood movie which was never made. Miller became an aviator in her own right, competing in the famous "Powder Puff Derby" of 1929, coming in third place in the light plan division.

Three years after Miller's pioneering flight, the first solo England – Australia flight by a woman was made in 1930 by Amy Johnson.

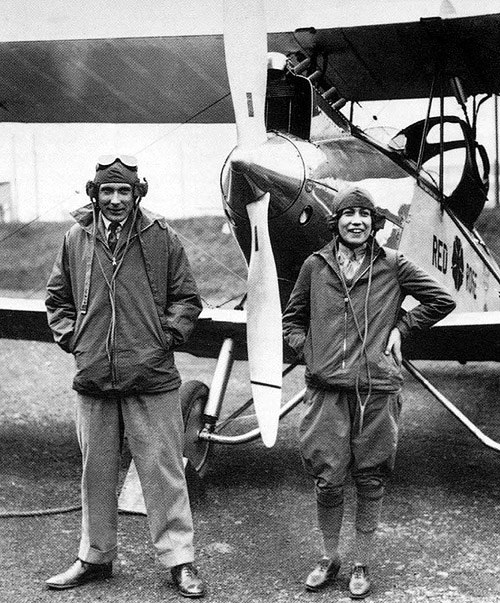
Bill Lancaster and Jessie Miller stand in front of the ''Red Rose''

In 1930, she set the cross country East-West record for a flight by a woman from California to New York. The record was bested by Ruth Nichols Rye in December 1930. The same month, Miller was in the news when she hadn't been heard from 4 days after taking off from Havana, en route to Miami. Miller, however, was able to force land on the Bahamian island of Andros.

A founding member of the international organisation for female pilots, the Ninety-Nines, Miller was the first woman to earn a commercial pilot’s licence in Canada, and also the first woman to fly from Florida to Cuba.

== Clarke murder ==
In 1932, Lancaster was in Mexico looking for work. At the same time, Haden Clarke, a male American writer, was living in Lancaster and Miller's Florida home in order to assist Miller in writing her autobiography. Clarke and Miller developed a relationship in Lancaster's absence, and Clarke convinced Miller to leave Lancaster and marry him instead. Upon receipt of this news, Lancaster returned promptly to Florida.

On 20 April, Clarke was killed by a gunshot wound to the head. Despite the facts that the gun was Lancaster's, and that he admitted forging suicide notes found at the scene (one addressed to Lancaster and another to Miller), Lancaster was acquitted of murder after the prosecution's arguments and evidence failed to persuade the jury.

== Return to England ==
After the trial, Lancaster and Miller returned to England. Lancaster decided to attempt the hotly contested England-to-South Africa speed record. He departed England on 11 April 1933, but crashed in the Sahara, and died stranded in the desert. His body was only found in 1962.

== Popular culture ==
Verdict on a Lost Flyer, a book on Bill Lancaster by Ralph Barker, was published by Harrap, London, in 1969.

The Fabulous Flying Mrs Miller: An Australian's true story of adventure, danger, romance and murder, by Carol Baxter, was published by Allen & Unwin, Sydney, in 2017.

The Lost Pilots, The spectacular rise and scandalous fall of aviation's golden couple, a book on Miller and Bill Lancaster by Corey Mead, was published by Macmillan, London in 2018.

A TV miniseries called The Lancaster Miller Affair was made in Australia in 1985, wherein Miller was portrayed by actress Kerry Mack.
