= Neva Paris =

American woman aviator (1883–1930)

- Born: Neva Finlay; 1883; Kansas City, Missouri
- Died: January 9, 1930 (aged 46–47); Woodbine, Georgia
- Occupation: Pilot

Neva Finlay Paris (1883 – January 9, 1930) was an early American woman aviator.

== Early life ==
She was born in Kansas City, Missouri, to New York banker and Manhattan real estate "heavy operator" Charles Finlay. She attended a school in Briarcliff, New York. She married realty broker Rex Lee Paris; they divorced on August 15, 1917.

== Flying ==
Paris learned to fly at the Curtiss Flying School in Garden City, New York, around 1928 or 1929. School officials described her as an apt pilot; during a solo flight she lost her propeller, but managed to land safely. She competed in the 1929 "Powder Puff Derby", the first official women-only air race in the United States, placing sixth in the heavy class, piloting her Curtiss Robin. Later that year, she and others founded the Ninety-Nines, an organization of women aviators, known at the time as the "97's" for the number of members. Paris was one of the four women who sent out the first call to begin organizing women pilots. Just days before her death, she was listed as the contact for women pilots wishing to join the organization.

She obtained a commercial pilot's license in 1930.

== Crash and death ==
She died on January 9, 1930, when her Curtiss Robin crashed in the marshes of the Satilla River outside of Woodbine, Georgia. She was 36 years old. The cause of the crash was unknown. It was speculated that she had lost consciousness after flying at an altitude of 2,000 feet, but others reported that she had been circling looking for a landing place. She recently had seen a doctor after a flight and may have been on medication.

At the time of her death, she had moved from California, where she had owned and managed an orange grove, and was living with her father in Great Neck, Long Island.
