= Mary Haizlip =

American aviator (1910–1997)

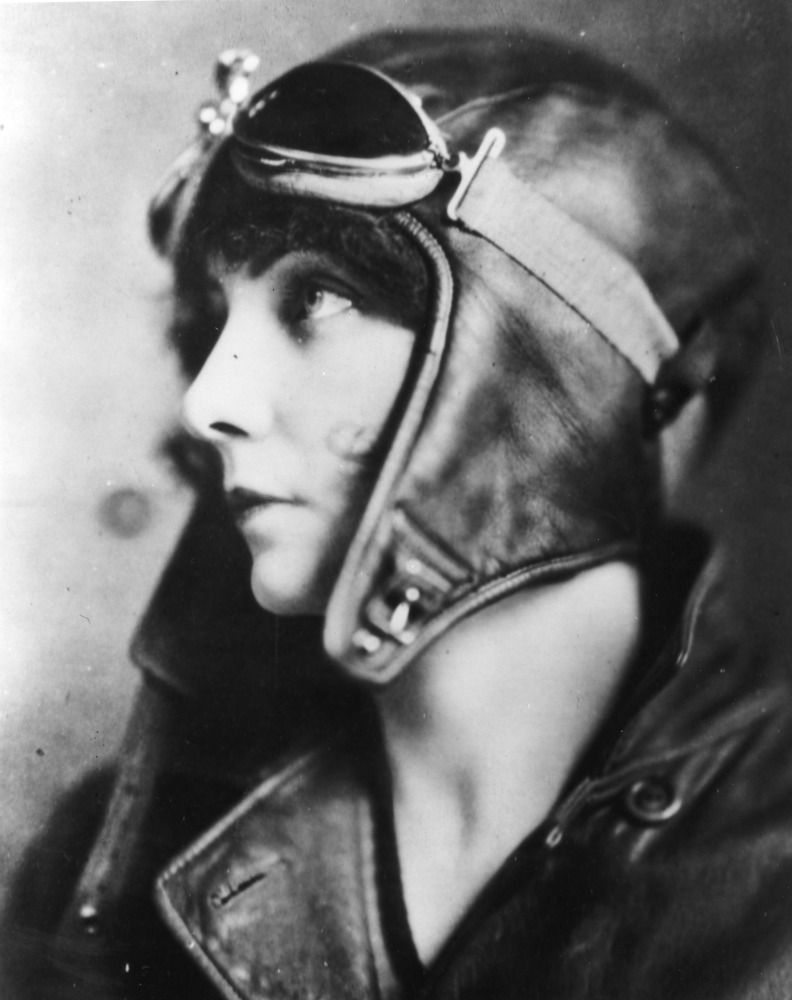
- Mary Haizlip, c.1930
- Born: 1910
- Died: 1997 (aged 86–87)
- Known for: Aviator

Mary Haizlip (1910–1997) was an American aviator who was the second woman in the United States to qualify for a commercial pilot's license.

She was one of the twenty competitors in the first Women's Air Derby, in 1929. For seven years she held the world's speed record for women and became the second highest prize winner, man or woman, at the 1931 National Air Races.

Haizlip was the first woman pilot inducted in the Oklahoma Aviation and Space Hall of Fame on December 17, 1982.
