= Masashi Gotō =

Japanese nuclear engineer

Masashi Goto (Japanese: 後藤政志, Gotō Manashi, born 1949) is a Japanese nuclear engineer, author, activist and commentator on the Fukushima Daiichi nuclear disaster.

He is the designer of the nuclear reactor vessels owned by Toshiba, where he worked from 1989 to 2009. His designs include the containment buildings of Kashiwazaki-Kariwa Nuclear Power Plant (Units 3 and 6), Hamaoka Nuclear Power Plant (Units 3 and 4) and Onagawa Nuclear Power Plant (Unit 3). Toshiba manufactured four of the six reactors the Fukushima Daiichi nuclear power plant in the 1970s. He rose to public prominence on 14 March 2011 by being the first "insider" (Note: he retired from Toshiba in 2009) addressing the press at the Foreign Correspondents' Club of Japan, three days after the Fukushima Daiichi nuclear disaster.

Since then, he became a regular commentator and featured as an expert in hearings regarding the nuclear disaster at Japan's Nuclear and Industrial Safety Agency and House of Councillors. From April 2013, he joined as an expert on the Citizen's Commission on Nuclear Energy, a think tank composed of professors of public policy.

== Academic career ==
He obtained a Doctor of Engineering in Tokyo Institute of Technology in 2005. After retirement from Toshiba in 2009, he was a lecturer on nuclear engineering in Waseda University, Tokyo City University, Shibaura Institute of Technology and Kokugakuin University.
