= Aichi E3A =

1929 Japanese reconnaissance aircraft

E3A (HD 56)
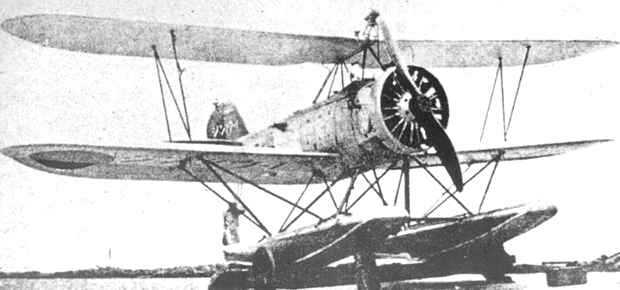

General information
- Type: Reconnaissance seaplane
- National origin: Germany/Japan
- Manufacturer: Aichi Kokuki
- Designer: Heinkel
- Primary user: Imperial Japanese Navy
- Number built: 12

History
- First flight: 1929

The Aichi E3A was a reconnaissance seaplane developed in Germany as the Heinkel HD 56 to operate from warships of the Imperial Japanese Navy, which designated it the Type 90-1 Reconnaissance Seaplane. It was a conventional single-bay biplane with staggered wings braced by N-type interplane struts. The pilot and gunner sat in tandem, open cockpits.

== Design and development ==
Aichi Tokei Denki requested a design for a reconnaissance seaplane from Heinkel to enter in an IJN competition. Heinkel built a single HD 56 prototype that was evaluated against the Nakajima E4N and the Kawanishi E5K. The Heinkel design was announced the winner in 1931, on the condition that Aichi would address some shortcomings, particularly a lack of range. Refined versions of the "losing" Nakajima and Kawanishi designs would eventually see production, with the Nakajima design being built in far greater numbers.

Modifications to the HD 56 by Aichi included reductions in length and span, the replacement of the prototype's Wright Whirlwind with a locally-built Hitachi Tempu, and numerous detail changes. Flight tests were carried out at Nagoya in August 1931, and the type was accepted into service the following year. E3As were still in service aboard Sendai class cruisers at the beginning of the Second Sino-Japanese War.

== Specifications (E3A1) ==
Data from Japanese Aircraft 1910–1941

General characteristics

- Crew: 2
- Length: 8.45 m (27 ft 9 in)
- Wingspan: 11.1 m (36 ft 5 in)
- Height: 3.67 m (12 ft 0 in)
- Wing area: 34.5 m^{2} (371 sq ft)
- Empty weight: 1,118 kg (2,465 lb)
- Gross weight: 1,600 kg (3,527 lb)
- Powerplant: 1 × Gasuden / Hitachi Type 90 Amakaze 9-cylinder air-cooled radial piston engine, 224 kW (300 hp) (天風)
- Propellers: 2-bladed propeller

Performance

- Maximum speed: 197 km/h (122 mph, 106 kn)
- Cruise speed: 125 km/h (78 mph, 67 kn)
- Range: 753 km (468 mi, 407 nmi)
- Endurance: 6 hours
- Service ceiling: 4,710 m (15,450 ft)
- Rate of climb: 2.7 m/s (530 ft/min)

Armament

- Guns:
  - 1 × fixed, forward-firing 7.7 mm (.303 in) machine gun in forward fuselage
  - 2=1 × trainable, rearward-firing 7.7 mm (.303 in) machine gun for gunner
- Bombs:
  - 2 × 30 kg (66 lb) bombs
