= Women's Air Derby =

American all-female air race

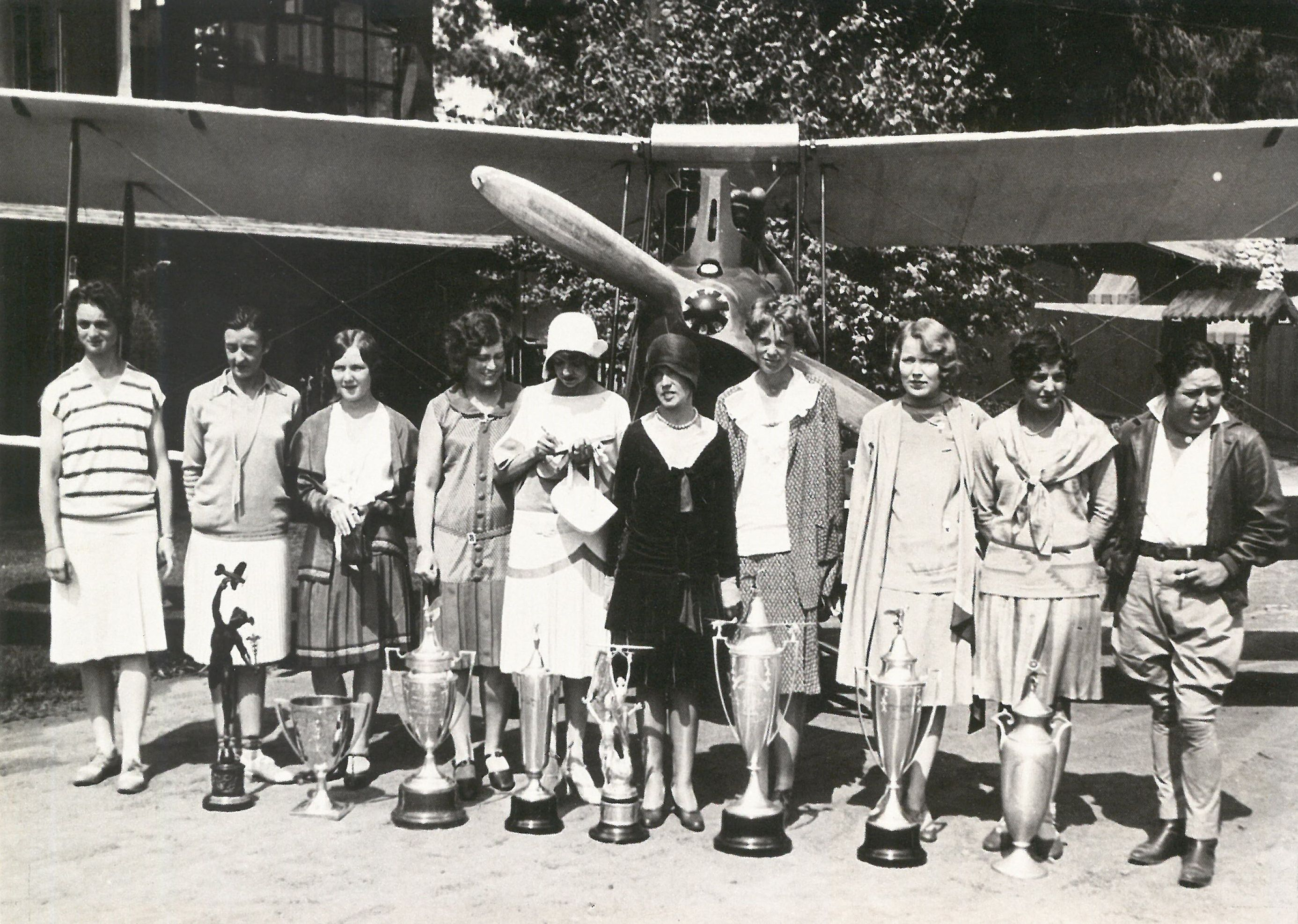
From left to right: Louise Thaden, Bobbi Trout, Patty Willis, Marvel Crosson, Blanche Noyes, Vera Dawn Walker, Amelia Earhart, Marjorie Crawford, Ruth Elder, and Pancho Barnes, in front of NC229K, de Havilland DH.60 Moth (c/n 41); at the Breakfast Club, Los Angeles, California, before the start of the race

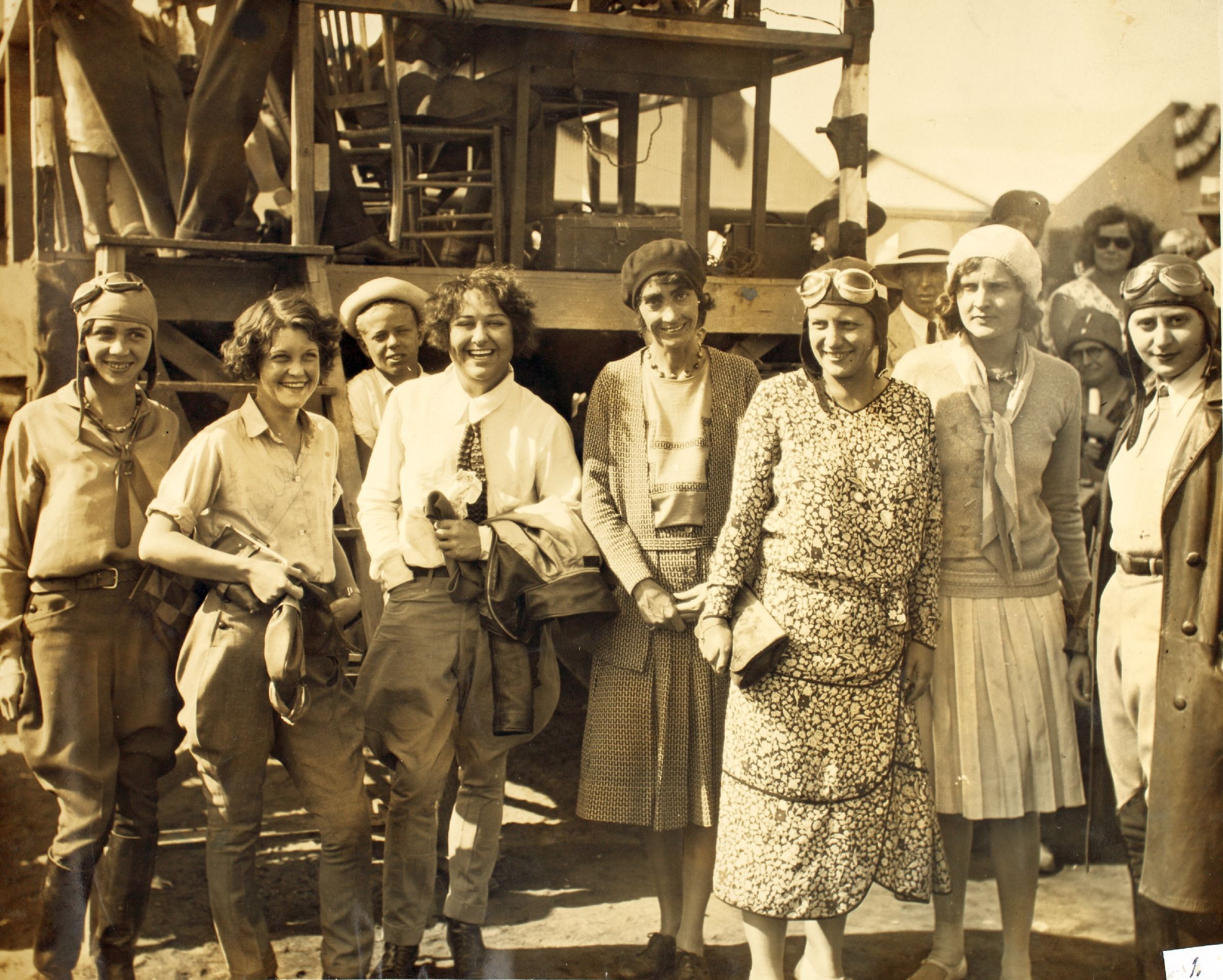
Pancho Barnes (fourth from the left) and the Powder Puff Derby at Long Beach, California

The Women's Air Derby was the first official women-only air race in the United States, taking place during the 1929 National Air Races. Humorist Will Rogers referred to it as the Powder Puff Derby, the name by which the race is most commonly known. Nineteen pilots took off from Clover Field, Santa Monica, California, on August 18, 1929; another left the next day. Marvel Crosson died in a crash apparently caused by carbon monoxide poisoning, but fifteen completed the race in Cleveland, Ohio, nine days later.

== The race ==
The first real race for female pilots was the Women's Air Derby during the 1929 National Air Races and Aeronautical Exposition. Air-race promoter Cliff Henderson was the founder of the first Women's Air Derby, which he patterned after the men's transcontinental air races. (Ironically, Henderson would ban women from competing in the 1934 Bendix Trophy and National Air Races after a crash which claimed the life of pilot Florence Klingensmith in 1933.)

Forty of the seventy applicants qualified, having at least 100 hours of solo flight, which included a minimum 25 hours of cross-country flying (these were the same rules that applied to men competing in the National Air Races). The twenty competitors, eighteen from the United States, were:

- Florence "Pancho" Lowe Barnes
- Marvel Crosson
- Amelia Earhart
- Ruth Elder
- Claire Mae Fahy
- Edith Foltz
- Mary Haizlip
- Jessie Miller, an Australian
- Opal Kunz
- Mary von Mach
- Ruth Nichols
- Blanche W. Noyes
- Gladys O'Donnell
- Phoebe Omlie
- Neva Paris
- Margaret Perry
- Thea Rasche, a German
- Louise Thaden
- Evelyn "Bobbi" Trout
- Vera Dawn Walker

The aircraft also had to have horsepower "appropriate for a woman." Opal Kunz's 300 hp (224 kW) Travel Air was deemed to be "too fast for a woman to fly" (even though she owned and flew it), so she had to find a less powerful aircraft to race.

The pilots, fourteen in the heavy plane class (with engines from 510 to 875 cubic inches [8,357 to 14,339] cm^{3}]) and six in the lighter class (275 to 510 cubic inches [4,506 to 8,357 cm^{3}]), took off from Santa Monica, California. Stops en route to Cleveland, Ohio, included San Bernardino, California; Yuma, Phoenix, and Douglas, Arizona; El Paso, Pecos, Midland, Abilene, and Fort Worth, Texas; St. Louis, Missouri; and Cincinnati, Ohio. At each stop, the pilots often stayed overnight for refueling, repairs, media attention and dinner banquets.

To keep all competing aircraft safely separated as they climbed to altitude, they were lined up in rows at the start of the race and took off at one-minute intervals, the lighter aircraft first. National Aeronautic Association official Joe Nikrent was the official timekeeper. Earhart had a stuck starter and had to return to the airfield, but repairs were made quickly, and she resumed flying. Later, "when Amelia damaged her propeller on the first leg of the journey, the race was held up until she could get it repaired," much to the annoyance of Pancho Barnes, who received no such consideration when she later crashed in Pecos, Texas.

Marvel Crosson crashed in the Gila River Valley and was killed on August 19, apparently the victim of carbon monoxide poisoning. There was a public outcry demanding the race be canceled, but the pilots got together and decided the most fitting tribute would be to finish the derby. Blanche Noyes had to put out a fire that erupted in mid-air over Pecos, but continued on. (In the 2010 documentary Breaking Through the Clouds: The First Women's National Air Derby, Noyes, a non-smoker, explained that she found a cigarette butt in her baggage compartment.) Margaret Perry caught typhoid fever. Pancho Barnes crashed into a car that drove onto the runway as she was trying to land at Pecos on August 22, wrecking her airplane. Ruth Nichols also crashed. Claire Fahy's wing wires were eaten through, possibly sabotaged with acid; she withdrew from the race.

An estimated 18,000 people gathered in Cleveland, Ohio, to greet the pilots at the end of the race. Louise Thaden finished the race first on August 26 and won the heavy class in a time of 20 hours, 19 minutes and 4 seconds. Phoebe Omlie won the light class in 25 hours, 12 minutes and 47.5 seconds.

Ten pilots in the heavy class finished in the following order:

1. Louise Thaden
2. Gladys O'Donnell
3. Amelia Earhart
4. Blanche Noyes
5. Ruth Elder
6. Neva Paris
7. Mary Haizlip
8. Opal Kunz
9. Mary von Mach
10. Vera Dawn Walker

Four women finished the race in the light class in the following order:

1. Phoebe Omlie
2. Edith Foltz
3. Jessie Keith-Miller
4. Thea Rasche

Bobbi Trout finished the race, but was untimed.

== Depictions ==
The race was the subject of the 1935 novel Women in the Wind: A Novel of the Women's National Air Derby by Francis Walton and the 1939 film adaptation, starring Kay Francis.

The book The Powder Puff Derby of 1929: The First All Women's Transcontinental Air Race, written by Gene Nora Jessen, was published in 2002.

The 2010 documentary Breaking through the Clouds: The First Women's National Air Derby covers the race from inception through conclusion, includes interviews with some surviving relatives of pilots, and offers short biographies of some of the women.

The 2015 documentary Beyond The Powder: The Legacy of the First Women’s Cross Country Air Race (directed by Kara White) examined the 1929 race, and the legacy of the race today, as women still run the race annually, now called the Air Race Classic.

The 2018 book by Keith O'Brien, Fly girls : how five daring women defied all odds and made aviation history, also covered the race and its place in history.

The 2019 book by Steve Sheinkin, Born to Fly: the first women's air race across America, was written for a young adult audience.

== Bibliography ==
- Jessen, Gene (2002). Powder Puff Derby of 1929: The True Story of the First Women's Cross–Country Air Race. SourceBooks. ISBN 9781570717697. ASIN: B0084PL9E4
- Read, Phyllis J. (1992). The Book of Women's Firsts: Breakthrough Achievements of Almost 1,000 American Women. Random House Information Group. ISBN 978-0-679-40975-5.
- Brick, Kay. Powder Puff Derby: The Record 1947–1977, Fallbrook, California: AWTAR, Inc, 1985, pg 6.
- Brooks-Pazmany, Kathleen L. 1991. United States Women in Aviation 1919–1929. Washington; Smithsonian Institution Press.
- Douglas, Deborah G. 1991. United States Women in Aviation 1940–1985. Washington; Smithsonian Institution Press.
- Oakes, Claudia M. 1991. United States Women in Aviation 1930–1939. Washington; Smithsonian Institution Press.
- Thaden, Lousie. 1938. High, Wide and Frightened. New York; Stackpole & Sons.
