= Louise Thaden =

American aviator (1905–1979)

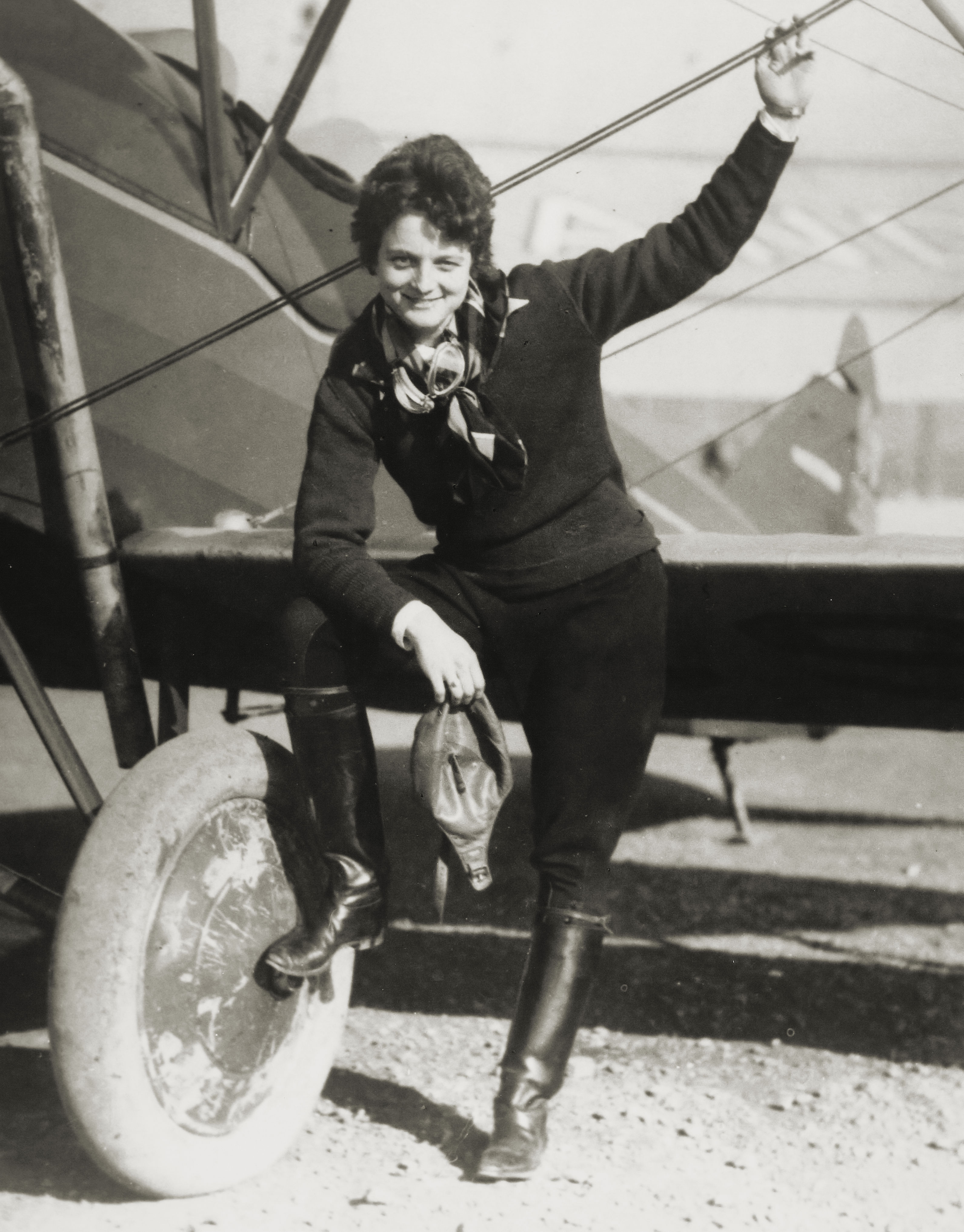
- Thaden c. 1930s
- Born: November 12, 1905; Bentonville, Arkansas, US
- Died: November 9, 1979 (aged 73); High Point, North Carolina, U.S.
- Occupation: Aviator
- Spouse: Herbert von Thaden
- Children: 2

Iris Louise McPhetridge Thaden (born Louise McPhetridge; November 12, 1905 – November 9, 1979) was an American aviation pioneer, holder of numerous aviation records, and the first woman to win the Bendix trophy, alongside Blanche Noyes. She was inducted into the Arkansas Aviation Historical Society's Hall of Fame in 1980.

== Birth and education ==
Louise McPhetridge was born in Bentonville, Arkansas, and attended Bentonville public schools. McPhetridge attended the University of Arkansas in Fayetteville, Arkansas, from 1921 to 1926 and studied as a journalism, physical education, and pre-medical major. She was initiated as a member of Delta Delta Delta in 1923.

== Aviation ==
In 1926, McPhetridge was working for the J.H.J. Turner Coal Co. where one of her main customers was the Travel Air Corporation in Wichita, Kansas, owned by Walter Beech. Beech liked McPhetridge and offered her a job as a sales representative in San Francisco, California, which she accepted. Her salary included free pilot's lessons, and she earned her pilot's certificate in 1928. She was the first female pilot to be licensed by the state of Ohio.

== Marriage ==
McPhetridge met Herbert von Thaden, who was a United States Army Signal Corps pilot and engineer who worked on developing the first American all-metal aircraft, the Thaden T-2. McPhetridge and von Thaden were married in San Francisco on June 19, 1928. By 1929, Louise Thaden had become only the fourth woman to hold a transport pilot rating.

== Records ==
Thaden rapidly became a major figure in the aviation world and set many world performance records and won many major flying events. In 1929, she became the first pilot to hold the women's altitude, endurance and speed records in light planes simultaneously. Thaden set the women's altitude record in December 1928 with a mark of 20,260 feet. In March 1929, she set the women's endurance record with a flight of 22 hours, 3 minutes, 12 seconds.

Following the fatal crash of Florence Klingensmith at the 1933 International Air Races, women were not allowed to enter the national air racing competition in 1934 due to sexism.

== Women's Air Derby ==
Thaden was a friend and rival of pioneer aviators Amelia Earhart, Pancho Barnes, Opal Kunz, and Blanche Noyes. Thaden defeated her colleagues in the first Women's Air Derby, also known as the Powder Puff Derby, in 1929. The Air Derby was a transcontinental race from Santa Monica, California to Cleveland, Ohio, which was the site of the National Air Races that year. It took place from August 13–20, 1929. Twenty women were entered in the race. Marvel Crosson was killed. Earhart damaged her aircraft at Yuma, Arizona, Barnes became lost and flew into Mexico and damaged her plane attempting to get back on course, and Noyes suffered an in-flight fire over Texas.

== Middle career ==
In 1930, Thaden went to work as the public relations director of Pittsburgh Aviation Industries (which had recently purchased her husband's Thaden Metal Aircraft Company) and became the director of the Women's Division of the Penn School of Aeronautics. That same year, Thaden and Earhart participated in the founding of an international organization for women pilots called the Ninety-Nines. Thaden turned down the presidency of the organization but served as the treasurer and vice-president. The Ninety-Nine organization still exists. In 1935, Phoebe Omlie, another pioneer female aviator, asked Thaden to become a field representative for the National Air Marking Program.

== 1936 Bendix Trophy Race ==
In 1936, Thaden won the Bendix Trophy Race in the first year women were allowed access to compete against men. She set a new world record of 14 hours, 55 minutes from New York City to Los Angeles, California. In her astonishing victory, she flew a Beech C17R Staggerwing biplane and defeated twin-engine planes specifically designed for racing. Laura Ingalls, another aviator, came in second by 45 minutes flying a Lockheed Orion. First prize was $4,500, and she also won the $2,500 prize for a woman finishing. Time magazine wrote on September 14, 1936:

To Pilots Thaden & Noyes the $7,000 prize money was far less gratifying than the pleasure of beating the men. Among the first ten U.S. women to earn transport licenses, they have for years been front-line fighters in aviation's "battle of the sexes." A fuzzy-haired blonde of 30, Mrs. Thaden has been flying since 1927, has held the women's speed, altitude and endurance records, is the mother of a 6-year-old son. She and Flyer Noyes both work regularly as air-marking pilots for the Department of Commerce. Short, brunette Mrs. Noyes is better known as the only pilot ever to fly John D. Rockefeller Sr. In the National Air Races, men contestants have always patronized women, in 1934 ousted them altogether. Smilingly observed Pilots Thaden and Noyes last week when they found they had won one of the two most important events of the Races: "Well, that's a surprise! We expected to be the cow's tail."

For her achievements Thaden won aviation's highest honor given to women, the Harmon Trophy.

== Aviation career ==
Thaden teamed up with Frances Marsalis and set another endurance record by flying a Curtiss Thrush high-wing monoplane over Long Island, New York for 196 hours. The pair made seventy-eight air-to-air refueling maneuvers. Food and water were lowered to the two by means of a rope from another aircraft. The event gained national attention and the pair made a series of live radio broadcasts from the aircraft.

In 1937, she became the National Secretary of the National Aeronautics Association. Just prior to her retirement, she returned to Beech Aircraft Corporation as a factory representative and demonstration pilot.

== Retirement ==
Thaden retired from competition in 1938. She worked for a time with the Bureau of Air Commerce to promote the creation of airfields. She also wrote her memoirs, High, Wide and Frightened soon after her retirement. In addition to her memoirs, she wrote numerous newspaper and magazine articles dealing with aviation issues. Thaden said women were "innately better pilots than men." The final chapter of her autobiography, "Noble Experiment," omitted from the 1973 and 2004 reissues of the book, is a short story giving a dystopian vision of the use of women in combat. It gains particular pertinence in its implicit criticism of the strategic bombing theories of Giulio Douhet and William ("Billy") Mitchell.

The Arkansas Aviation Historical Society selected Thaden in 1980 as one of five initial inductees in the Arkansas Aviation Hall of Fame.

== Death ==
Thaden died of a heart attack at High Point, North Carolina on November 9, 1979.

== Legacy ==
- In 1951, the airport in Bentonville, Arkansas was renamed Louise Thaden Field in her honor.
- In 1974, the Library Building at the National Staggerwing Museum in Tullahoma, Tennessee was named for Thaden.
- In 1991, astronaut Linda Godwin carried Thaden's flying helmet into space on the Space Shuttle to honor her achievements and the early women pioneers of flight.
- In 1999, Thaden was inducted into the International Air & Space Hall of Fame at the San Diego Air & Space Museum and the National Aviation Hall of Fame
- In 2004, the University of Arkansas Press re-published Thaden's autobiography, High, Wide, and Frightened.
- In 2017, Thaden School, an Independent School, was founded in Bentonville, Arkansas in honor of Louise Thaden.
- In 2000, Thaden was inducted into the Women in Aviation International Pioneer Hall of Fame.
- In 2021, an opera memorializing her run in the 1936 Bendix Trophy Race titled Staggerwing was premiered at the Kansas Aviation Museum. Composed by Lisa DeSpain with librettist Rachel J. Peters, Staggerwing was the winner of the 2020 zepick modern opera commission.
