= Eagle Aircraft Eagle =

American agricultural aircraft

Eagle DW.1
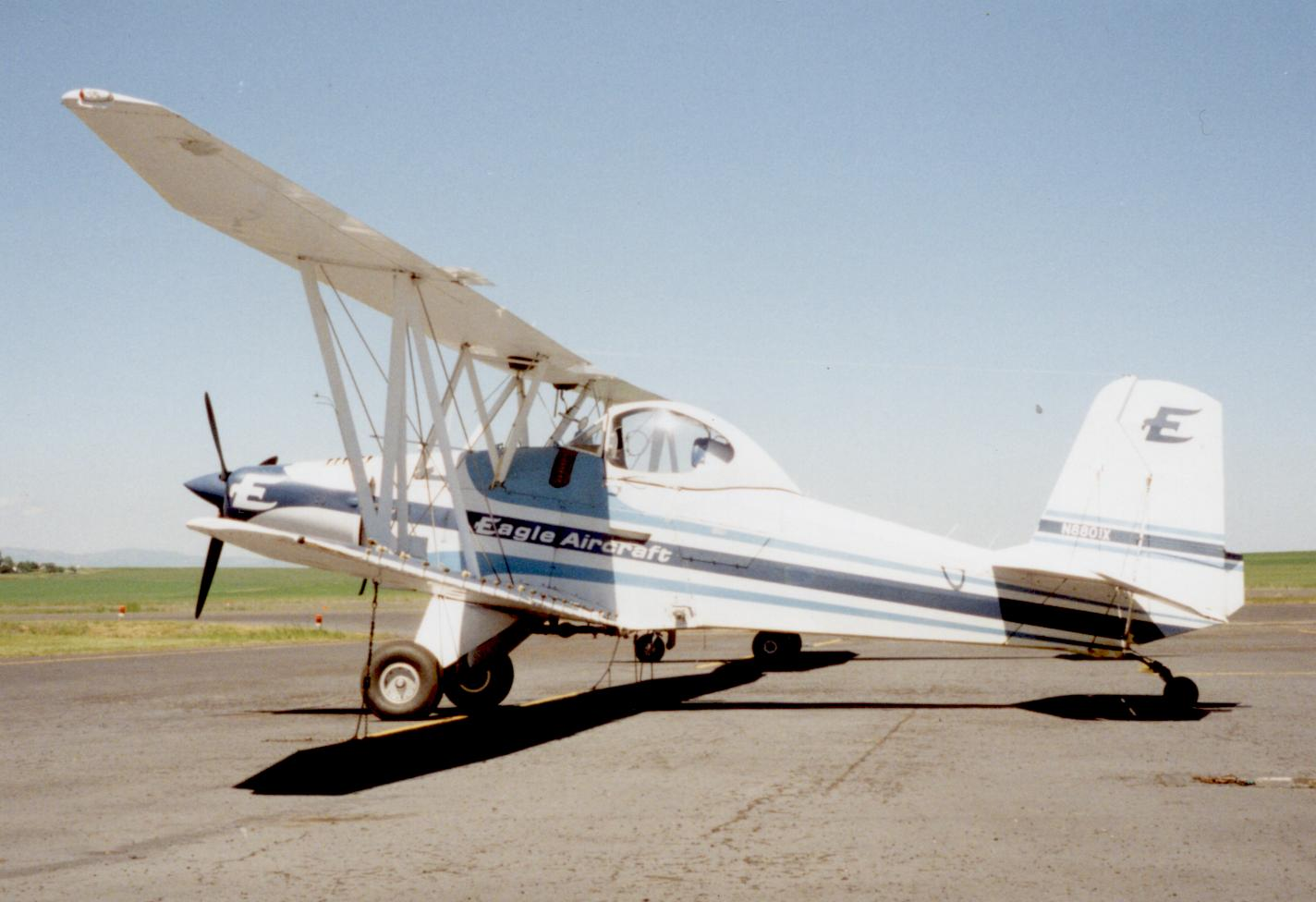
- 1980-built DW.1 agricultural biplane at Grangeville, Idaho in June 1994

General information
- Type: Agricultural biplane
- National origin: United States
- Manufacturer: Eagle Aircraft Company
- Designer: Dean Wilson
- Status: Production completed (1983)
- Primary user: Crop-spraying firms
- Number built: 95

History
- Introduction date: 1979
- First flight: 1977

The Eagle DW.1 is an American-built single-seat agricultural biplane of the late 1970s.

== Development ==
The DW.1 was designed by Dean Wilson of the Eagle Aircraft Company of Boise, Idaho and the first example first flew in 1977. The Eagle is a single-seat agricultural biplane with tapered long-span wings, an enclosed single-seat cockpit and fixed tailwheel undercarriage. The prototype was fitted with a Jacobs R-755-B2 radial engine but later examples were fitted with other more modern powerplants.

Production was sub-contracted to Bellanca Aircraft of Alexandria, Minnesota. The type certificate was sold to Alexandria Aircraft LLC in 2002, but no further production has been undertaken.

== Operational history ==
95 examples of the DW.1 were built between 1979 and 1983. Their use has been predominantly in the agricultural aviation field as crop dusters and sprayers. In 2001, over 40 examples remained in use throughout the United States.

== Variants ==
Eagle 220
220 hp (164 kW) Continental W670-6N radial engine;
Eagle 300
300 hp (224 kW) Lycoming IO-540-M1B5D flat-six engine.

== Specifications (Eagle 220) ==
Data from Simpson, 2001, p. 204

General characteristics

- Crew: one
- Length: 26 ft 0 in (7.92 m)
- Wingspan: 55 ft 0 in (16.76 m)
- Height: 10 ft 7 in (3.23 m)
- Empty weight: 2,650 lb (1,202 kg)
- Gross weight: 5,400 lb (2,449 kg)
- Powerplant: 1 × Continental W670-6N , 220 hp (164 kW)

Performance

- Maximum speed: 110 mph (180 km/h, 96 kn)
- Cruise speed: 90 mph (140 km/h, 78 kn)
- Range: 180 mi (290 km, 160 nmi)
