= Waco Custom Cabin series =

General aviation aircraft

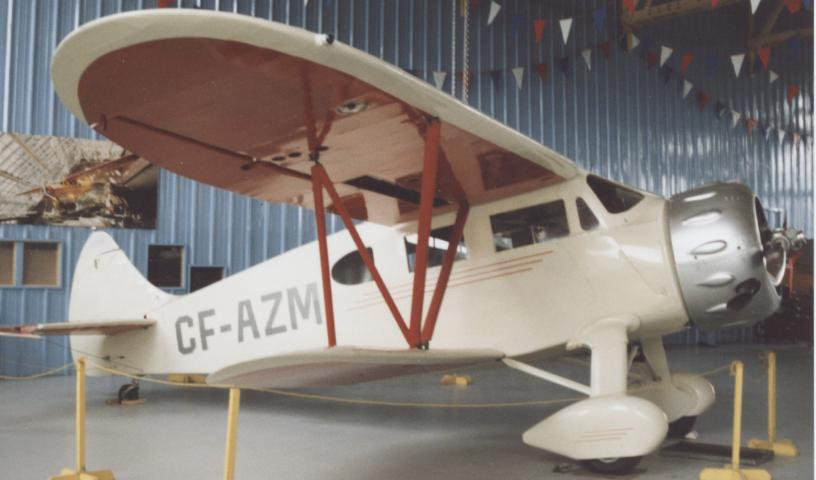
- Waco EQC-6 marked as Grant McConachie's aircraft

General information
- Type: Four to five place cabin sesquiplane
- Manufacturer: Waco Aircraft Company
- Primary user: Private individuals, air taxiis
- Number built: 350+

History
- Manufactured: 1935–1939
- Introduction date: 1935
- First flight: 1935
- Developed from: Waco Standard Cabin series
- Variants: Waco E series, Waco N series

The Waco Custom Cabins were a series of up-market single-engined four-to-five-seat cabin sesquiplanes of the late 1930s produced by the Waco Aircraft Company of the United States. "Custom Cabin" was Waco's own description of the aircraft which despite minor differences, were all fabric-covered biplanes.

== Design ==
Nearly all of the Waco Custom Cabins were powered by radial engines (there being one factory-built exception, the MGC-8) and the purchaser could specify almost any commercially available engine and Waco would build an aircraft powered by it, hence the profusion of designations, as the first letter indicates the engine installed. Some models were offered in case someone wanted a specific engine but not all were built. Fuselage structure was typical for the period, being welded steel tubing with light wood strips to fair the shape in. The wings were made of spruce with two spars each, having ailerons on only the upper wings, mounted on a false spar. Split flaps were installed on the undersides of the upper wings, though two designs were used depending on model – placed either mid-chord (OC, UC and QC), or in the conventional position at the trailing edge of the wing (GC and N). The model N was unusual in being the only model with flaps on the lower wings while the model E was the only one with plain flaps. Wing bracing was with a heavily canted N strut joining upper and lower wings, assisted by a single strut bracing the lower wing to the upper fuselage longeron, except on the E series which replaced the single strut with flying and landing wires. Elevators and rudder were aerodynamically counterbalanced and braced with wire cables. Both could be trimmed, the rudder via a ground-adjustable tab, the elevators via jack screw on the OC, UC and QC, while the GC, E and N used a single trim tab on the port (left) elevator. The main landing gear was sprung with oleo struts, and a castoring tailwheel was fitted on all versions except the VN model, which had a nosewheel.

== Designation clarification ==
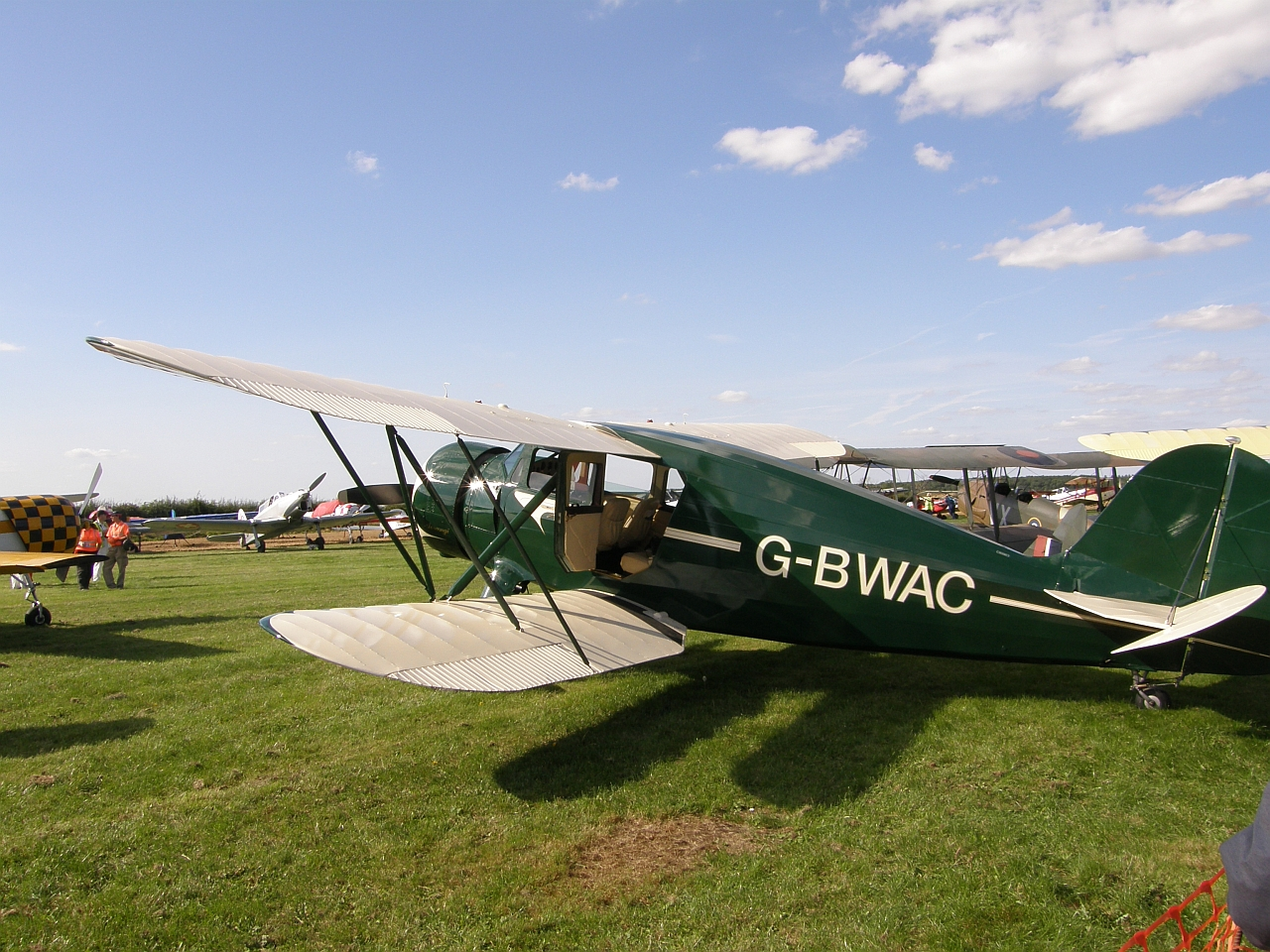
Waco YKS-7

Waco had been building a series of successful cabin biplanes, when in 1935 they introduced a new series of upmarket cabin sesquiplanes intended for the wealthy private individual or business. The original biplanes had been given a designation ending in C, however with the new Custom Cabin, Waco decided to differentiate the new design and existing C types that remained in production were recoded as C-S types to indicate Standard Cabin, until Waco changed their designation again in 1936 to just an S. For example, the 1934 Standard Cabin YKC was redesignated as a YKC-S in 1935, and as a YKS-6 in 1936. 1936 also saw the adoption of a numerical suffix to indicate the model year of the design, as "-6" for 1936, "-7" for 1937, etc. Since it referred to a model and not the year of production, the "-7" was carried into 1939 for some Custom Cabins, while others were designated "-8". In 1936, Waco started using a short form to refer to the types of aircraft without the engine and model identifiers resulting in C-6, C-7 and C-8 however as Waco only built one type of Custom cabin in each of those years, they refer to the QC-6, GC-7 and GC-8 series respectively.

== Operational history ==
The Custom Cabin series, with its improved performance proved to be popular and many were purchased by small commercial aviation firms and non-aviation businesses. Approximately 300 Custom Cabin Wacos of all types (excluding the Waco E series and the Waco N series), were produced between 1935 and 1939. Some were employed as "executive transports". Many served in the Canadian bush country, where they normally operated on skis in winter and EDO floats in summer. Many of these Canadian Wacos were ordered and built as freighters with additional doors. In 1936 an EQC-6 operated by Speers Airways of Regina, Saskatchewan was the first non-military government operated air ambulance in Canada. With the onset of World War II, examples were impressed into the air forces of many Allied nations, including the US (USAAC and US Navy), the United Kingdom, South Africa, Australia and New Zealand. Most were used as utility aircraft, however a small number were operated by the US Civil Air Patrol, conducting anti-submarine patrols off the US coastline from March 1942 to August 1943 armed with 50- or 100-pound bombs. A single impressed ZGC-7 referred to as the Big Waco, RAF serial AX695, was used by the British Long Range Desert Group (LRDG) along with a Standard Cabin YKC named Little Waco to support their activities behind Axis lines. Flight Regiment 19, Finnish Air Force (Swedish Volunteer Air Force) used one Waco ZQC-6 (OH-SLA) during the Russo-Finnish Winter War in support of Finnish military operations. Numerous Custom Cabin series aircraft of several sub-models are currently registered in the US, and more are in under restoration. This is still a popular design among owners of classic aircraft.

== Variants ==
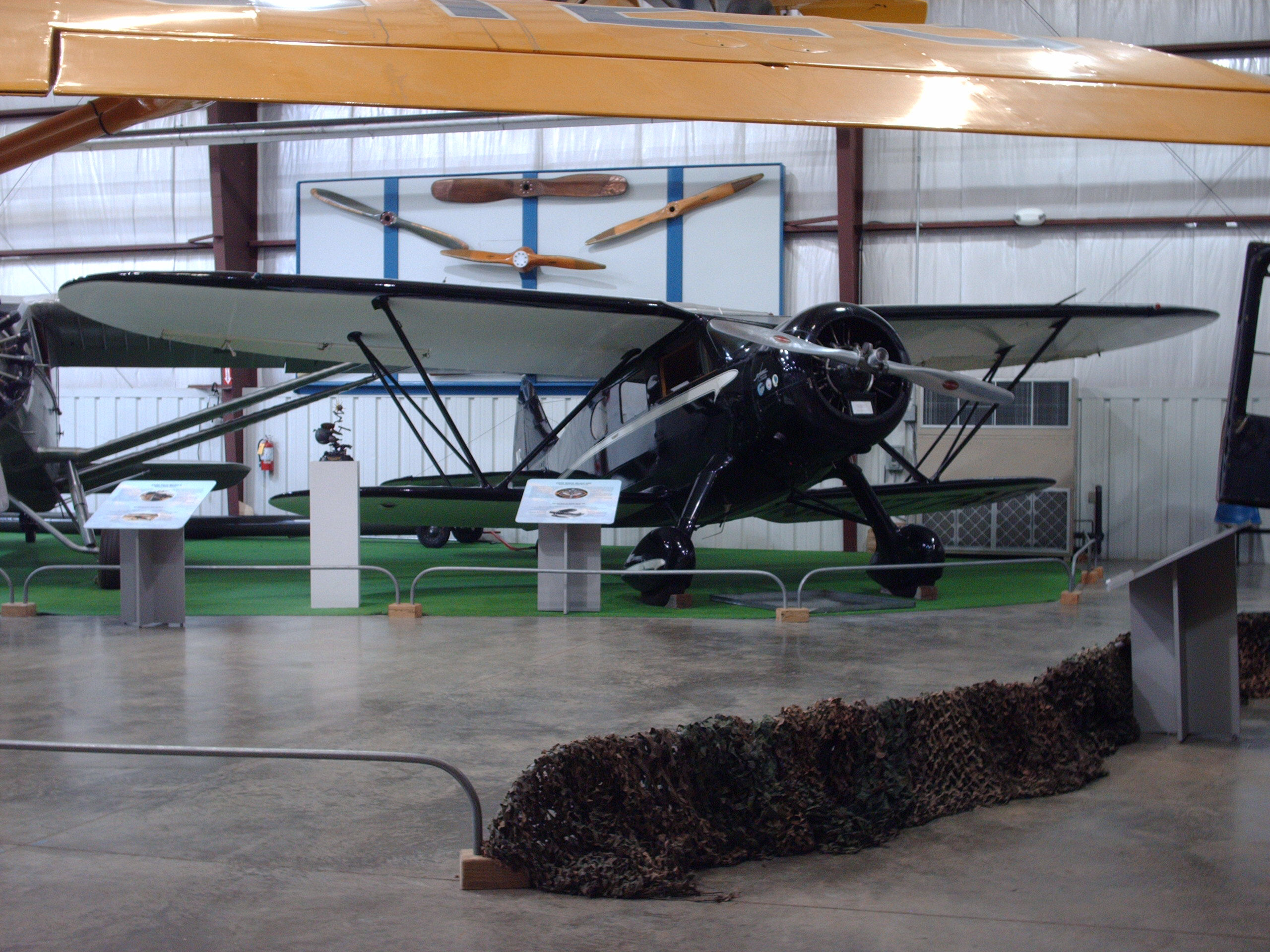
Waco YOC at Virginia Aviation Museum. This aircraft was once owned by Hollywood artist Walter Matthew Jeffries who was responsible for the design of the original Starship Enterprise.

The Waco Custom cabin series included all of the enlarged-cabin sesquiplanes from 1935 and can be further divided into six basic models, OC, UC QC, GC, RE and VN, with additional subtypes differing primarily in engine installation (indicated by the first letter of the designation or by a low dash number, i.e. -1, -2) and by model year (dash numbers -6, -7, -8). Letters were not used sequentially. Each basic type was offered with almost any engine the customer wished and designations were created accordingly, however some engines were more popular than others resulting in some types being offered, but never built. Due to the wide variety of engines already offered, it was both relatively easy and common to change the installed engine, resulting in a lot of confusion as to the correct designation to use for a specific airframe.

The RE series is more refined aerodynamically than earlier models; the wings are fully plywood-skinned, and instead of a bulky compression strut carrying lift loads, a more conventional set of streamlined flying wires completes the wing structure. It has the fastest cruise speed of any of the Waco cabin models, with a Vne of 270 mph.

=== 1935 OC Series (54+ built) ===
UOC
210 hp (157 kW) Continental R-670-A or 225 hp (168 kW) Continental R-670-B engine. four built.

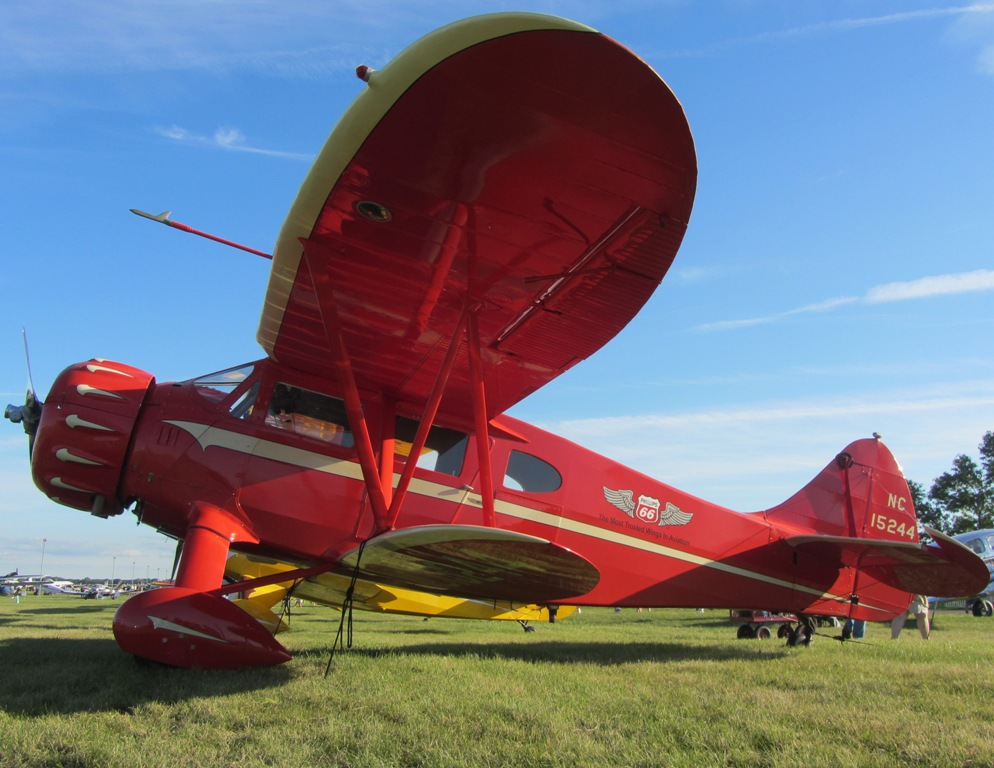
1935 Waco YOC

YOC
225 hp (168 kW) Jacobs L-4 engine. 50+ YOC and YOC-1 built. Built as UOC and re-engined.
YOC-1
285 hp (213 kW) Jacobs L-5 engine. Built as UOC and re-engined. One impressed by USAAF as UC-72N.

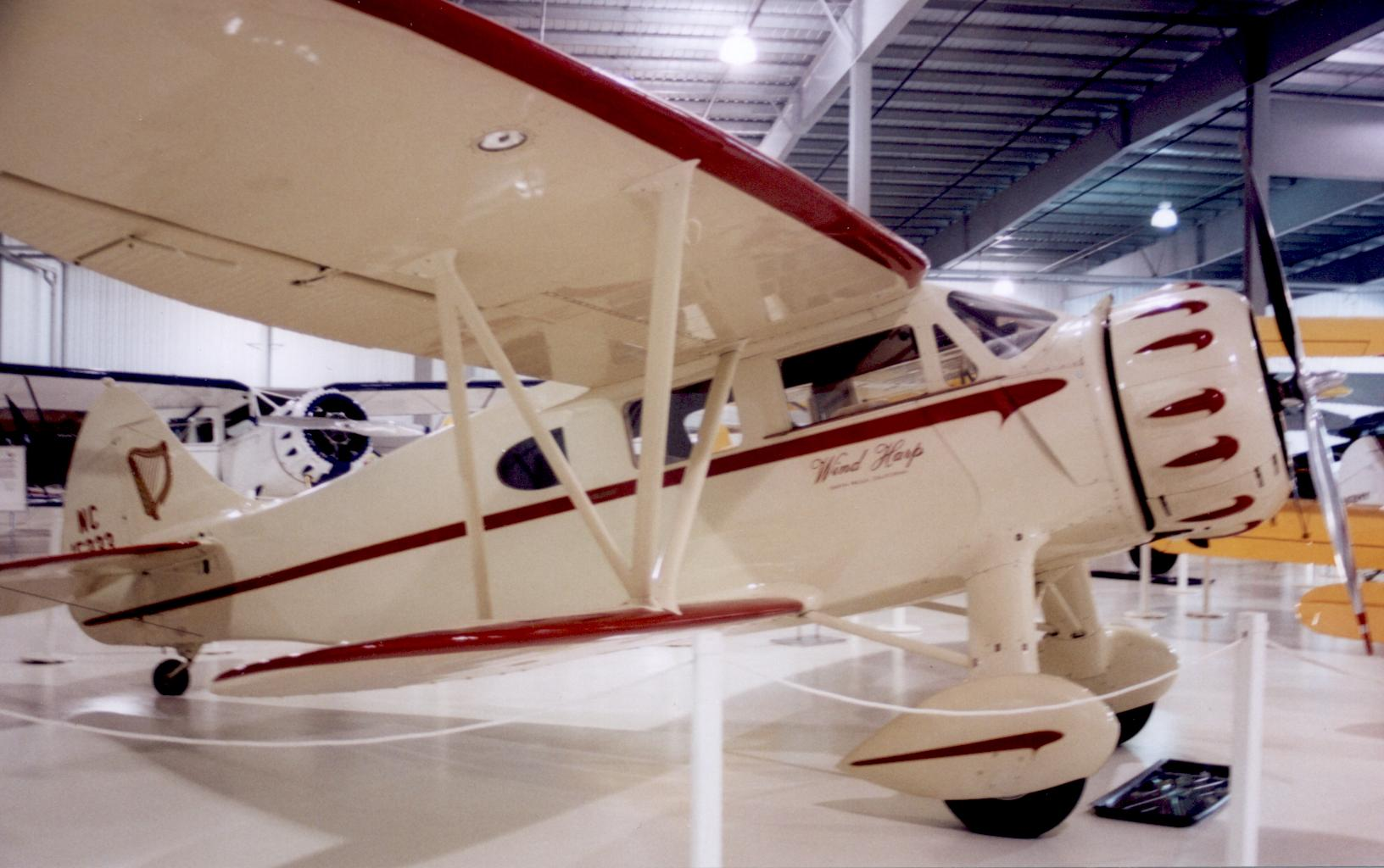
Waco CUC of 1935. Anoka-Blaine airport near Minneapolis, June 2006

=== 1935 UC Series (30+ built) ===
CUC
250 hp (186 kW) Wright R-760-E engine. 30+ built of all CUC types.
CUC-1
285 hp (213 kW) Wright R-760-E1 engine. Built as CUC and re-engined. One impressed by USAAF as UC-72F.
CUC-2
320 hp (239 kW) Wright R-760-E2 engine. Built as CUC and re-engined.

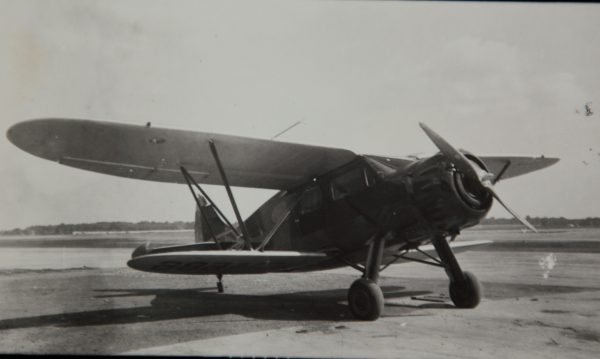
A Waco ZQC-6

=== 1936 QC Series (C-6) (120 built) ===
AQC-6
330 hp (246 kW) Jacobs L-6 engine. Seven built. One impressed by USAAF as UC-72G.
AQC-6 Freighter: At least two aircraft ordered through Fleet Aircraft and built for use in Canada with additional freight doors on both sides of the fuselage and equipped for floats. Engine same as for standard AQC-6. Additional aircraft may have been modified.

CQC-6
250 hp (186 kW) Wright R-760-E engine. None built.
DQC-6
285 hp (213 kW) Wright R-760-E1 engine. 11 built.
EQC-6
320 hp (239 kW) Wright R-760-E2 engine. 20 built. USCG used three as J2W-1
SQC-6
300 hp (224 kW) Pratt & Whitney Wasp Jr. engine. None built.
UQC-6
210 hp (157 kW) Continental R-670 or 225 hp (168 kW);hp Continental W-670-K or 220 hp (164 kW);hp Continental W-670-6. None built.
VQC-6
250 hp (186 kW) Continental W-670-M1 engine. One built.
YQC-6
225 hp (168 kW) Jacobs L-4 engine. 13 built. One ex-RAAF example re-engined with 200 hp (149 kW);hp DeHavilland Gypsy 6 inline engine.
ZQC-6
285 hp (213 kW) Jacobs L-5 engine. 68 built. One impressed by the USAAF as UC-72Q and five as UC-72H.; Swedish AF Tp-8a
ZQC-6 Freighter: At least eight aircraft ordered through Fleet Aircraft and built for use in Canada with additional freight doors on both sides of the fuselage and equipped for floats. Engine same as for standard ZQC-6. Additional aircraft may have been modified.

=== 1937–38 GC Series (C-7 and C-8) (96+ built) ===
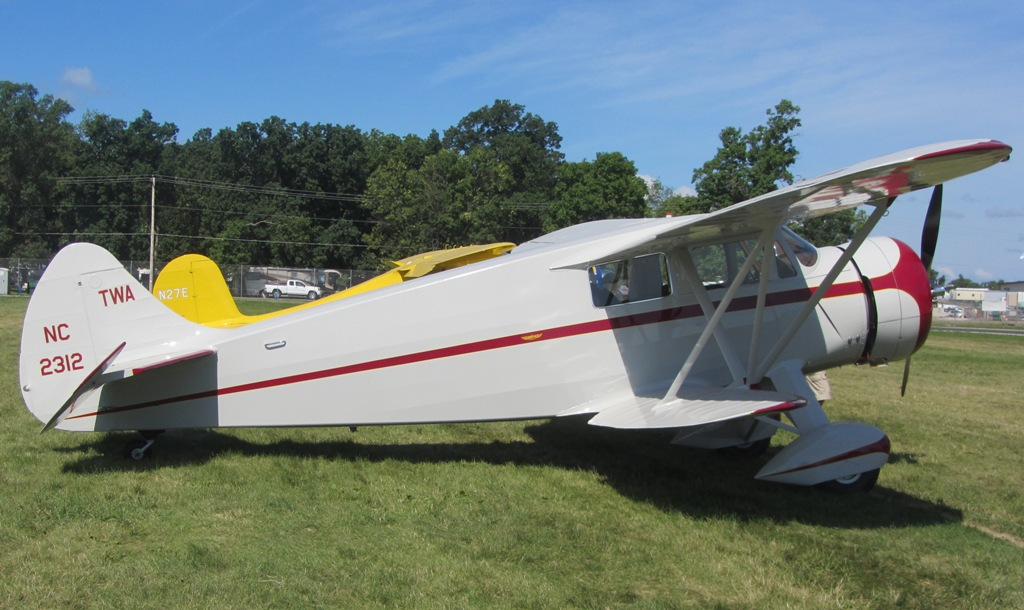
WACO AGC-8

AGC-8
300 hp (224 kW) Jacobs L-6 engine. 17 built, two modified to EGC-8. Two impressed by USAAF as UC-72P.
DGC-7
285 hp (213 kW) Wright R-760-E1 engine. Two built.
EGC-7
320 hp (239 kW) Wright R-760-E2 engine. 38 built.
EGC-8
same as EGC-7 for 1938. Seven built, plus two modified from AGC-8, and one used to trial 260 hp (194 kW) Menasco C-6S-4 for MGC-8. Four impressed by USAAF as UC-72B
MGC-8
Menasco Buccaneer inline engine. One modified, unknown number built.
UGC-7
210 hp (157 kW) Continental R-670 engine. None built.
VGC-7
250 hp (186 kW) Continental W-670-M1 engine. None built.
YGC-7
225 hp (168 kW) Jacobs L-4 engine. None built.
YGC-8
225 hp (168 kW) Jacobs L-4 engine. Trailling edge flaps. None built.
ZGC-7
300 hp (224 kW) Jacobs L-5 engine. 28 built. Four impressed by USAAF as UC-72E
ZGC-8
same as ZGC-7 for 1938, four built.

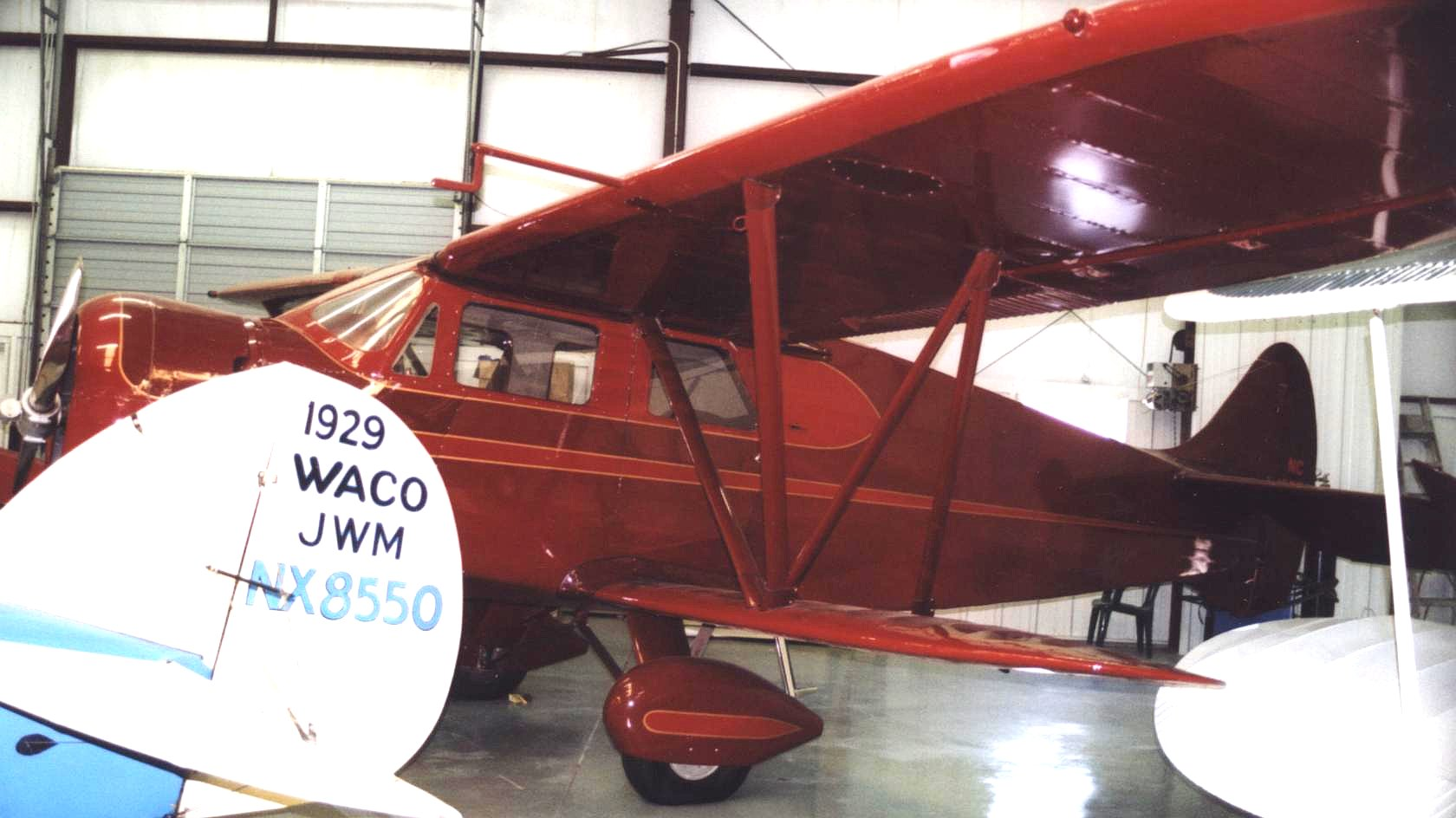
Waco AVN-8 at the Historic Aircraft Restoration Museum.

=== 1938 VN Series (N-8) (20 ca. built) ===
AVN-8
330 hp (246 kW) Jacobs L-6 engine.
ZVN-8
285 hp (213 kW) Jacobs L-5 engine.

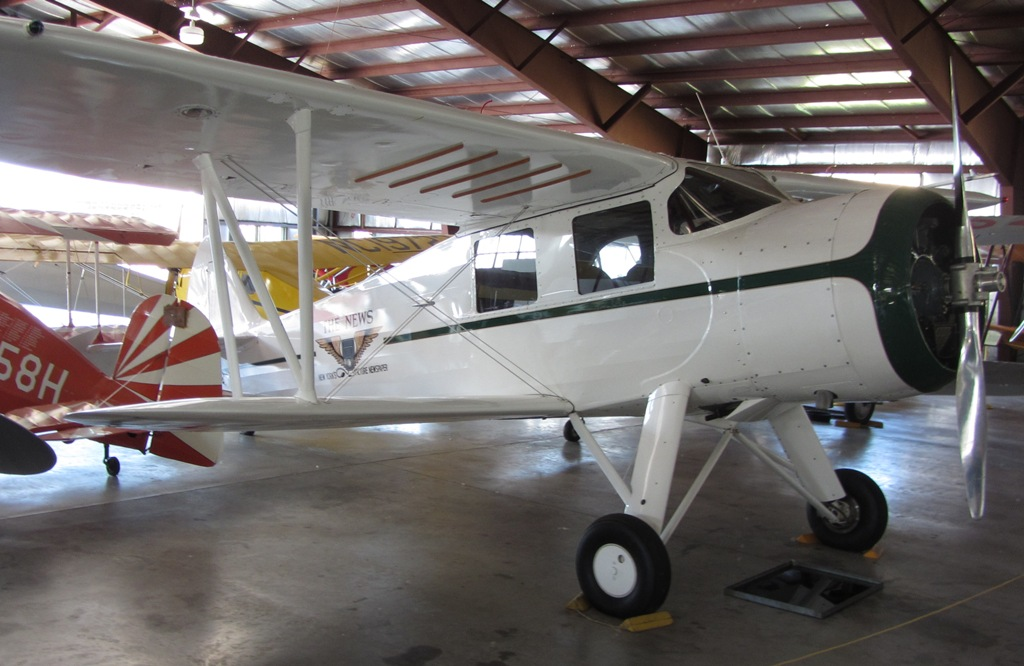
EAA AirVenture Museum's Waco ARE originally modified for the New York Daily News for aerial photography, with enlarged windows.

=== 1939 RE Series (30 built) ===
ARE Aristocrat
330 hp (246 kW) Jacobs L-6 (four built, one impressed by USAAF as UC-72A)
HRE Aristocrat
300 hp (224 kW) Lycoming R-680-E3 (five built, two impressed by USAAF as UC-72C)
SRE Aristocrat
450 hp (336 kW) Pratt & Whitney Wasp Jr SB-2/-3 (21 built, 13 impressed by USAAF as UC-72)
WRE Aristocrat
450 hp (336 kW) Wright R-975 – none built

=== Military designations ===
A-54
Royal Australian Air Force designation for impressed YQC-6

Tp-8a
Swedish Air Force designation for ZQC-6. Tp-8 was a generic designation for all Wacos.

J2W
US Coast Guard designation for three EQC-6 bought from Waco. Additional aircraft impressed by the US Navy were undesignated.

UC-72/C-72
US Army Air Forces designation for impressed Custom Cabin series Wacos.

UC-72B	:	EGC-8	four impressed
UC-72E	:	ZGC-7	four impressed
UC-72P	:	AGC-8	two impressed
UC-72Q	:	ZQC-6	one impressed
UC-72G	:	AQC-6	one impressed
UC-72H	:	ZQC-6	five impressed
UC-72F	:	CUC-1	one impressed

== Operators ==
=== Civil operators ===
Wacos were used in small numbers by a very large number of individual operators in many countries.

=== Military operators ===
Most operators operated either a single example, or a very small number.

Argentina

- Argentine Navy (EQC-6 and UOC)

Australia

- Royal Australian Air Force impressed (YQC-6)

Brazil

- Exército Brasileiro (30 EGC-7)

Canada

- Royal Canadian Air Force impressed (AQC-6)
- Department of National Defence purchased (two ZQC-6)

Finland

- Finnish Air Force impressed (ZQC-6)

Netherlands

- Royal Netherlands Air Force possibly impressed (EGC-7)

New Zealand

- Royal New Zealand Air Force impressed (UOC)

Nicaragua

- Nicaraguan Air Force (EGC-7)

South Africa

- South African Air Force impressed at least ten Wacos of different types (CUC and YOC)

Sweden

- Swedish Air Force (ZQC-6)

United Kingdom

- Royal Air Force impressed (ZVN-8) and ZGC-7)

United States

- United States Coast Guard (three EQC-6)
- United States Navy
- United States Army Air Forces (impressed 18 of various types – see above)

== Aircraft on display ==
Aside from the large number of privately owned Wacos that continue to exist, a number have also found their way into museums.

Museum	Location	Type	Identity
Canadian Museum of Flight	Langley, BC	AQC-6	CF-CCW
EAA AirVenture Museum	Oshkosh, WI	ARE	NC20953
Historic Aircraft Restoration Museum	Maryland Heights, MO	AVN-8	NC19378
Golden Wings Flying Museum	Minneapolis, MN	CUC-1	NC15233
Virginia Aviation Museum	Richmond, VA	YOC	NC17740
War Eagles Air Museum	Santa Teresa, NM	EGC-8	NC19354
Yukon Transportation Museum	Whitehorse, YT	ZQC-6	CF-BDZ

== Specifications (ZQC-6) ==
Data from Juptner, U.S. Civil Aircraft Series, Vol. 6

General characteristics

- Crew: one
- Capacity: four passengers
- Length: 26 ft 8 in (8.13 m)
- Upper wingspan: 35 ft 0 in (10.67 m)
- Lower wingspan: 24 ft 6 in (7.47 m)
- Height: 8 ft 8 in (2.64 m)
- Wing area: 244 sq ft (22.7 m^{2}) total
- Airfoil: Clark Y
- Empty weight: 2,023 lb (918 kg)
- Gross weight: 3,500 lb (1,588 kg)
- Powerplant: 1 × Jacobs L-5 seven cylinder radial engine, 285 hp (213 kW) , first letter in designation (Z) indicates engine installed.
- Propellers: 2-bladed

Performance

- Maximum speed: 166 mph (267 km/h, 144 kn)
- Cruise speed: 150 mph (240 km/h, 130 kn)
- Service ceiling: 17,000 ft (5,200 m)

== See also ==
Related development

- Waco Standard Cabin series
- Waco S series
- Waco F series

Aircraft of comparable role, configuration, and era

- Avro Club Cadet
- Avro 641 Commodore
- Beechcraft Model 17 Staggerwing
- Bristol Type 110A
- Brown-Young BY-1
- Canadian Vickers Vanessa
- Cunningham-Hall PT-6
- Stinson SB-1 Detroiter

Related lists

- List of civil aircraft
- List of aircraft of World War II
- List of aircraft of the United States during World War II
- List of military aircraft of the United States
- List of military aircraft of Sweden
- List of military aircraft of Finland
