= Eagle Aircraft Company =

American aircraft manufacturer

- Type: aircraft design and manufacturing
- Founded: 1977
- Founder: Dean Wilson
- Headquarters: Boise, Idaho, United States

Eagle Aircraft Company is an American aircraft manufacturer specializing in agricultural aircraft.

== Aircraft ==
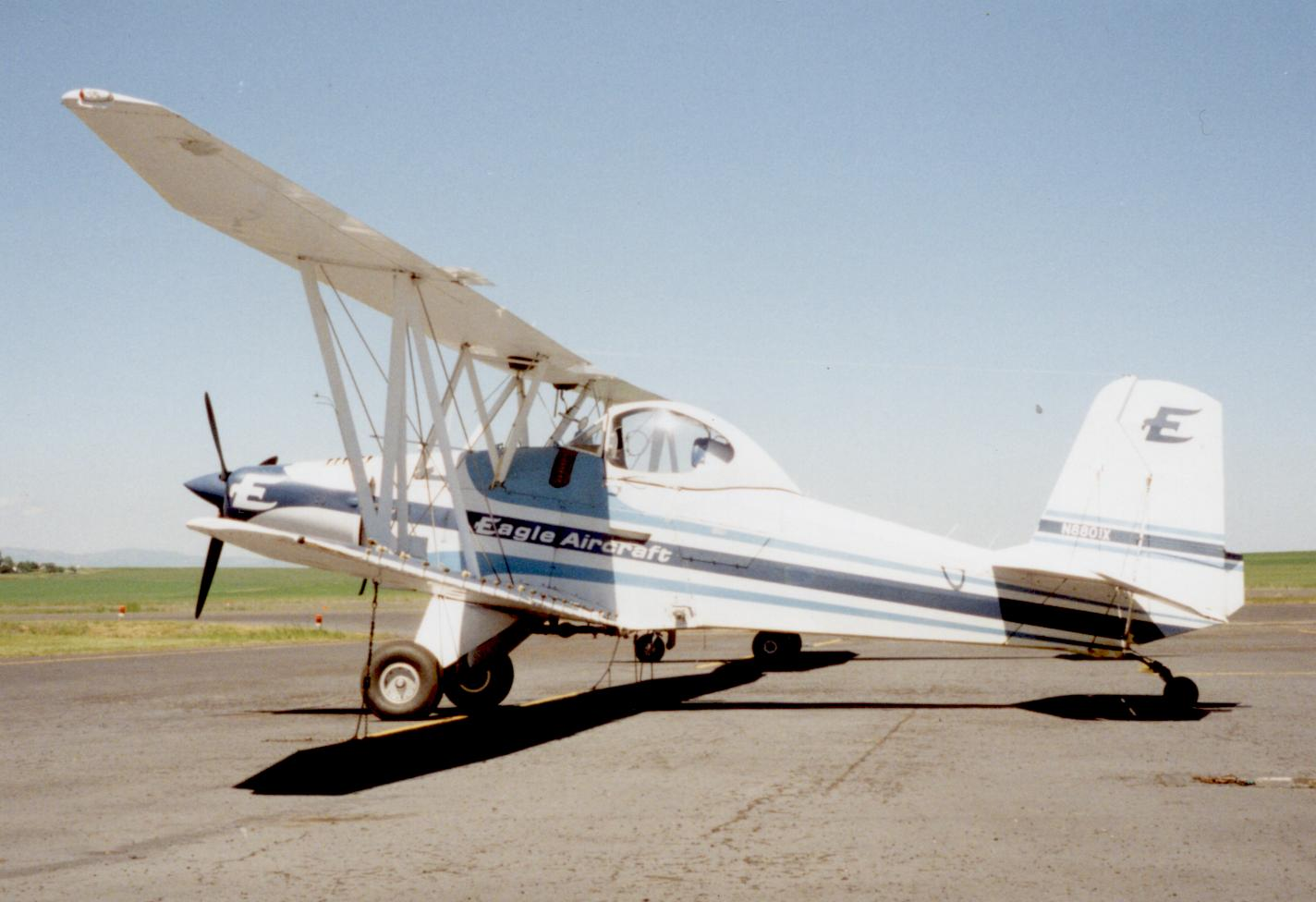
Eagle DW.1 crop-sprayer fitted with a 300 h.p. Lycoming IO-540 engine at Grangeville, Idaho in June 1995

Eagle was founded in 1977 by Dean Wilson, with the company's base being located at Boise, Idaho. Wilson designed the Eagle Aircraft Eagle agricultural biplane, which first flew in 1977, powered by a Jacobs R-755-B2 radial engine. The aircraft was fitted with long-span tapering wings, which allowed a payload of 2,750 lb (1,247 kg) and a spraying speed of 65 mph (105 km/h)

Further production was sub-contracted to Bellanca Aircraft of Alexandria, Minnesota, who built a series of 95 aircraft for Eagle between 1979 and 1983. Over 40 examples remained in agricultural use in 2001.

== Eagle Aircraft Flyer Special ==
In 1981 Eagle Aircraft owner Dean Wilson designed a race car for the 1981 Indianapolis 500. The special, aircraft inspired, design remained unproved due to an engine malfunction. Wilson returned for the 1982 Indianapolis 500 with driver Ken Hamilton. Hamilton, father of Davey Hamilton, was a proven and experienced midget car racing and supermodified racing driver. The car, fitted with a Chevrolet small-block engine, failed to qualify. The car was subsequently retired. In 2001 the car appeared, fully restored, in the Hemelgarn Racing garage.
