= Waco Standard Cabin series =

Type of aircraft

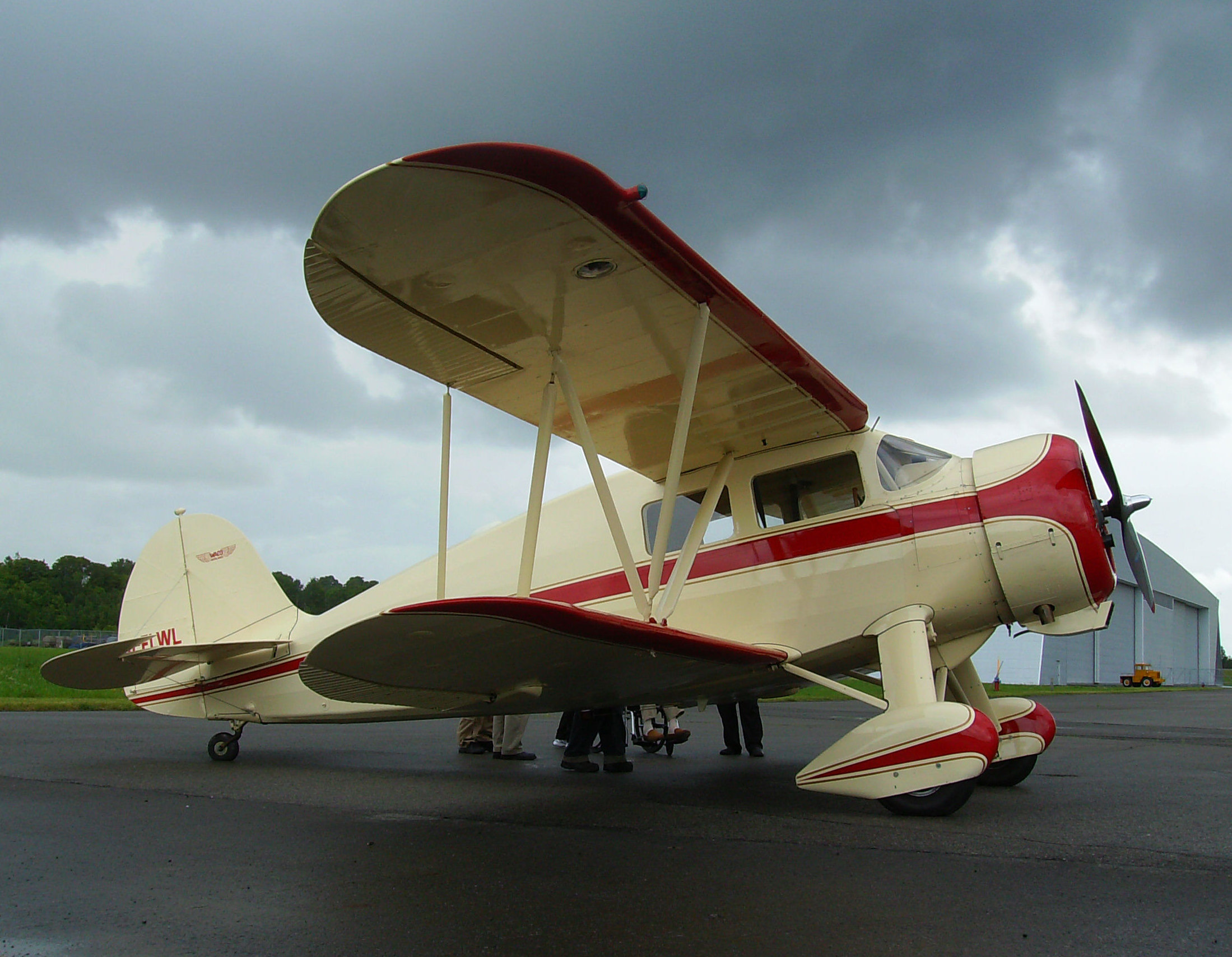
- 1937 Waco VKS-7 late Standard Cabin biplane (C-FLWL) at the Canada Aviation and Space Museum at Rockcliffe, ON.

General information
- Type: 4-5-seat cabin biplane
- National origin: United States
- Manufacturer: Waco Aircraft Company
- Status: Several still airworthy in 2009

History
- Introduction date: 1931

The Waco Standard Cabin series is a range of American single-engine 4–5 seat fabric covered cabin biplanes produced by the Waco Aircraft Company beginning in 1931 with the QDC and continuing until 1942 when production ended for the VKS-7F. They were used as light passenger and utility transports, navigational trainers, bushplanes and briefly as maritime reconnaissance aircraft during World War II.

== Design ==
All of the Waco Standard Cabins were powered by cowled radial engines and Waco tried to accommodate their customers preferences for many of the more common commercially available engines of the period, hence the profusion of designations, as the first letter indicates the engine installed. Individual models were each certified with various available engines but not all variations found customers.

Fuselage structure was typical for the period, being welded chrome-moly tubing with light wood strips to fair the shape in and covered with fabric. Wings were built around two solid spruce spars with the airfoil formed from trussed ribs made from plywood and spruce. The leading edge was covered in aluminum sheeting and the whole assembly covered in fabric. Ailerons were interconnected with a strut mounted to the trailing edge and on some versions were sheeted with ribbed aluminum. Most models were not fitted with flaps – the VKS-7F, built for the Civilian Pilot Training Program (CPTP) being the exception. It was fitted with split flaps only on the undersides of the upper wings and at mid chord, inboard and just ahead of the ailerons. Wing bracing was with a canted N strut joining upper and lower wings, assisted by a single strut bracing the lower wing to the upper fuselage longeron, there being no bracing wires. Elevators and rudder were built up from welded steel tubing braced with wire cables, and both could be trimmed, the elevators in flight and the rudder with a ground adjustable tab. Normally the main undercarriage was made up of a pair of vees, sprung with oleo/spring struts with brakes as standard equipment, and a free-castoring tailwheel sprung with triangulated shock cords were fitted to most aircraft, although a small number for Brazil were fitted with a tail skid. Floats were offered as an option, starting with the UIC which had Edo P-3300 floats. Later types (including the UKC, YKC and CJC) were offered with Edo 38-3430 floats.

== Development ==
The standard cabin series were Waco's first successful cabin biplane design, and were developed to accompany the F series airframe in their lineup. The Model C series had the top longerons raised to form a four-seat cabin which was entered through a door between the wings on the left side and had a rather distinctive rear-view window that was cleaned up, and then dispensed with in the later standard cabins. The initial QDC model of 1931 was offered with a 165 hp (123 kW) Continental A70 cowled engine, or as the BDC, ODC, PDC and UDC with other engines (as listed under variants). 1932 saw the introduction of the OEC and UEC models. Continuous refinement and improvement by Waco Aircraft resulted in production of various sub-models continuing until 1939.

In 1935, Waco introduced its slightly larger Custom Cabin series (which featured a sesquiplane layout without ailerons on the lower wing), they decided to differentiate between the Standard and Custom Cabin types by appending an S to the model designator. in 1936 the C-S was replaced with an 'S' signifying 'Standard'. For example, the YKC of 1934 became the YKC-S of 1935 and the YKS of 1936, though with additional minor improvements.

== Operational history ==
The Standard Cabin series, with its cabin comfort, proved to be popular with private pilot owners. Many were purchased by small commercial aviation firms and non-aviation businesses. With the onset of World War II, examples were impressed into the air forces of many Allied nations, including the US (USAAC and US Navy), the United Kingdom, South Africa, Australia and New Zealand. USAAC Designations assigned to standard cabin Wacos included UC-72D (for 2 VKS-7s), UC-72K (for 1 YKS-7) and UC-72M (for 2 ZKS-7s). Most were used as utility aircraft, however a small number were operated by the US Civil Air Patrol, conducting anti-submarine patrols off the US coastline from March 1942 to August 1943 armed with 50- or 100-pound bombs. In 1942 21 VKS-7F were built for the Civilian Pilot Training Program for use as navigational trainers. A single impressed YKC referred to as the Little Waco, RAF serial AX697, was used by the British Long Range Desert Group (LRDG) along with a Waco Custom Cabin ZGC-7 Big Waco to support their activities behind Axis lines. After World War II, some impressed UC-72 cabins returned to civilian operations, and a very few were additionally revamped (with FAA approval) with new engine models. This further complicated model nomenclature, though the FAA generally retained original nomenclatures for a given re-engined airframe. Fewer than 135 Standard Cabin series aircraft of several sub-models are currently registered in the USA.

== Variants ==
Data from Aerofiles

=== Early Skylight ===
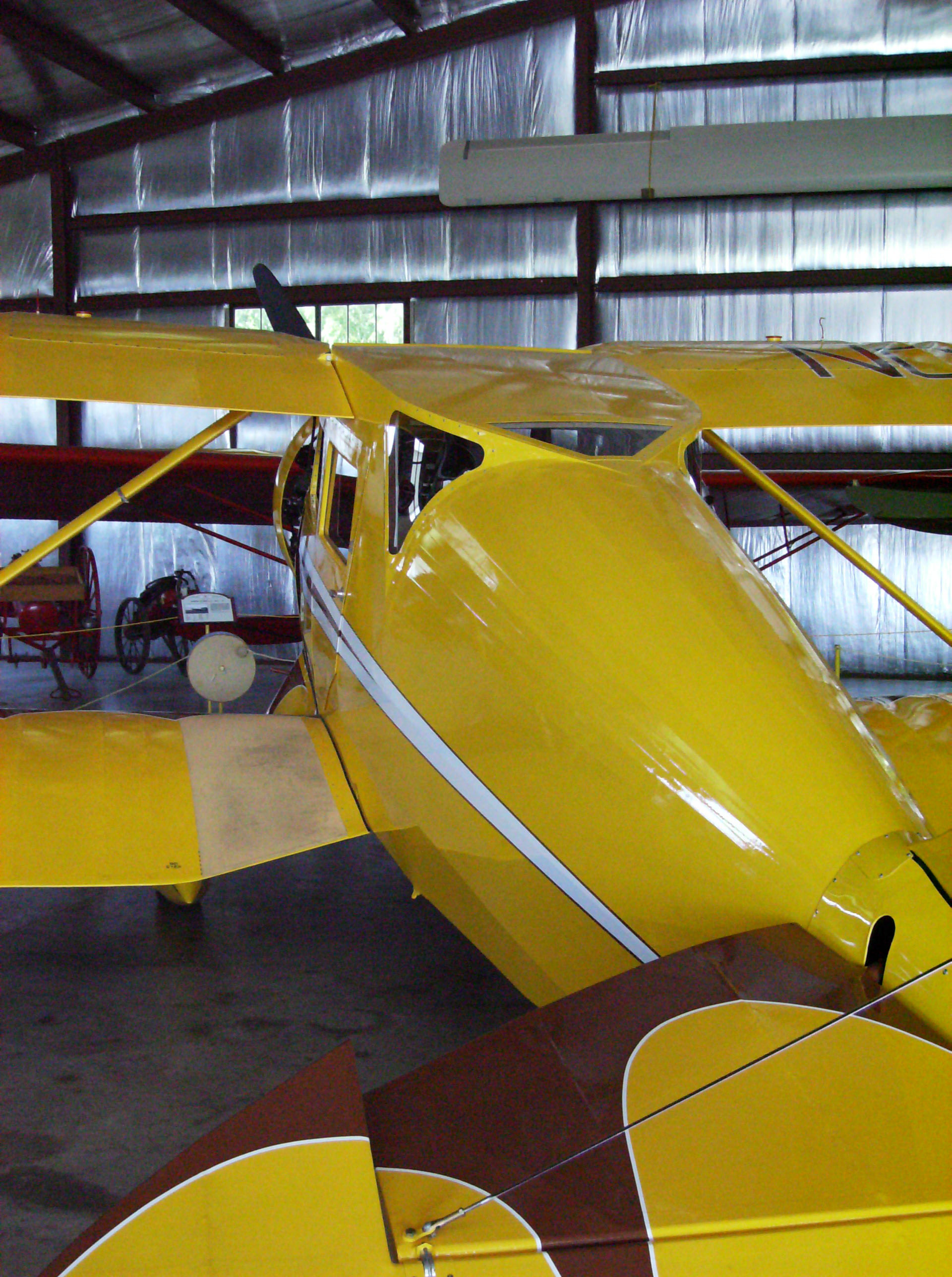
Waco UEC at the EAA Airventure Museum, Oshkosh showing distinctive skylight used on early cabin Wacos

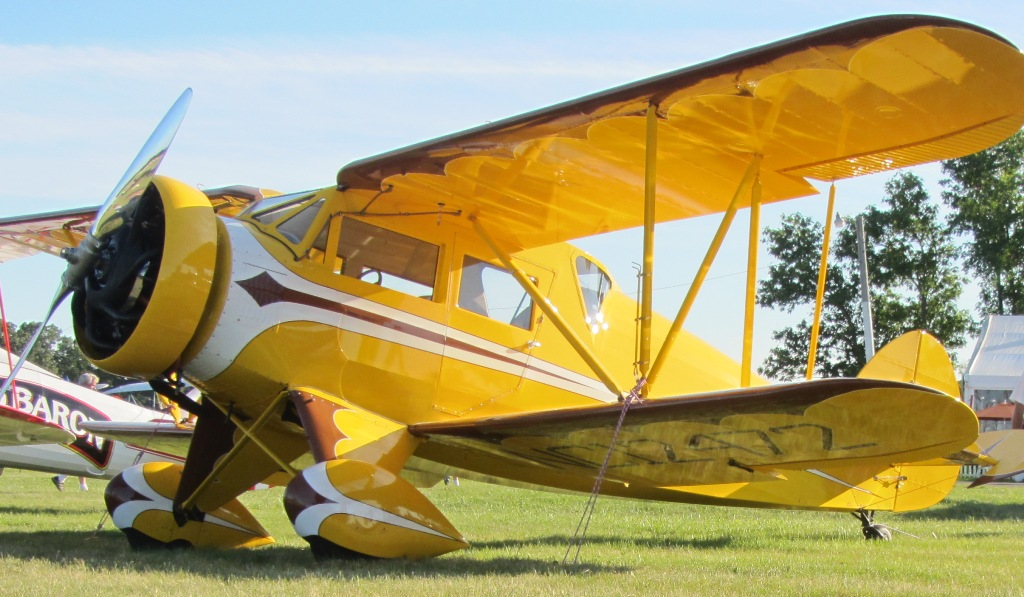
Waco UEC

==== DC Series ====
BDC
165 hp (123 kW) Wright R-540 engine. No record of production.
ODC
210 hp (157 kW) Kinner C-5 engine. modified to QDC.
PDC
170 hp (127 kW) Jacobs LA-1 engine. 2 built on special order.

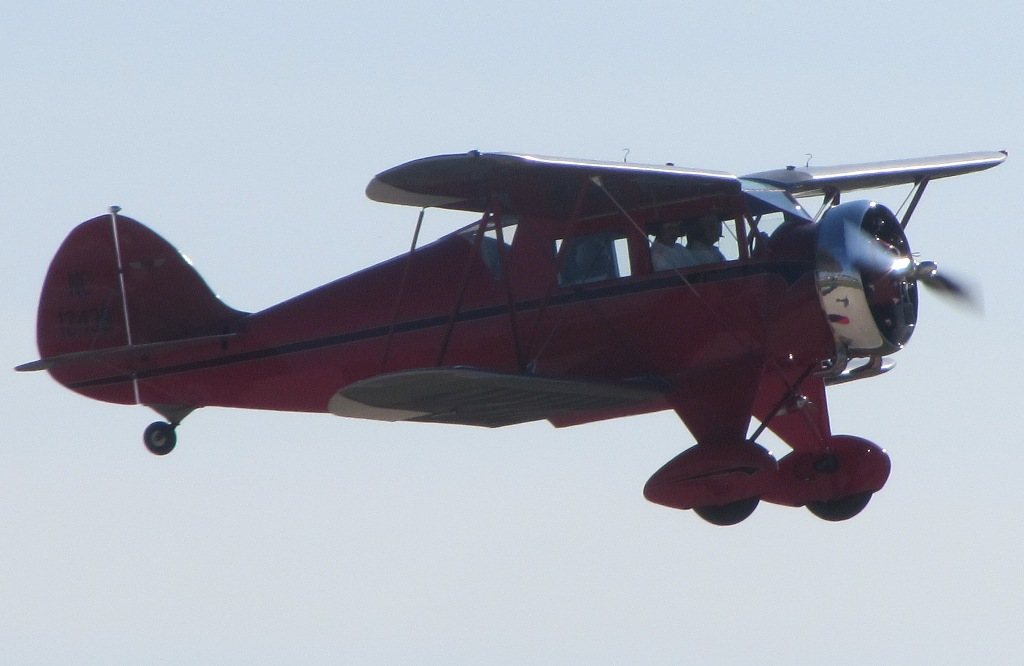
WACO QDC

QDC
165 hp (123 kW) Continental A-70 engine. 37 built.
UDC
210 hp (157 kW) Continental R-670 engine. No record of production.

==== EC Series ====
BEC
165 hp (123 kW) Wright R-540 engine. 1 built, [X12440], (converted to OEC or UEC).
OEC
210 hp (157 kW) Kinner C-5 engine. 3 built.
UEC
210 hp (157 kW) Continental R-670 engine. 40 built.

=== Late Skylight ===
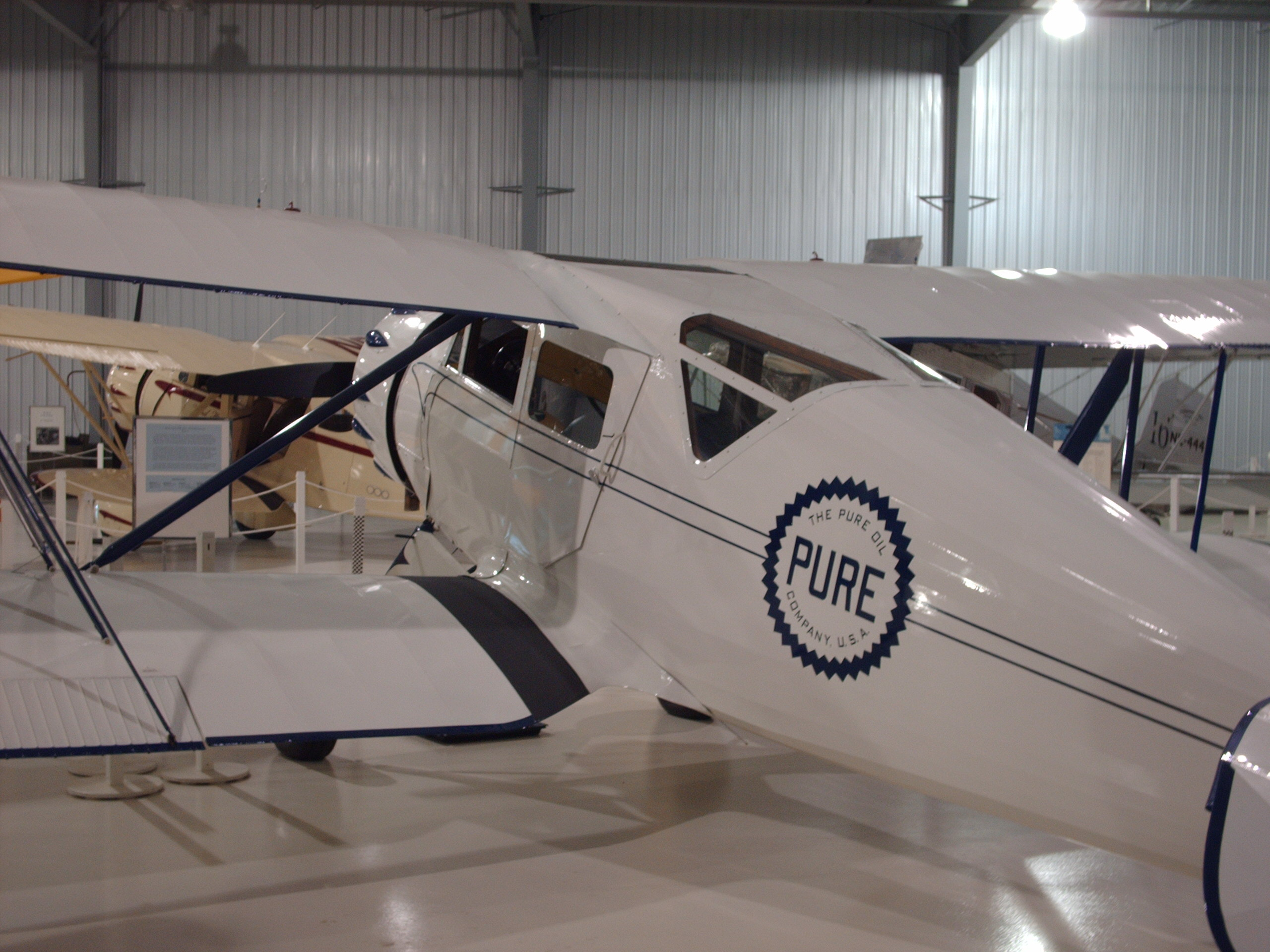
1934 Waco UKC showing late skylight smoothly faired in

==== IC Series ====
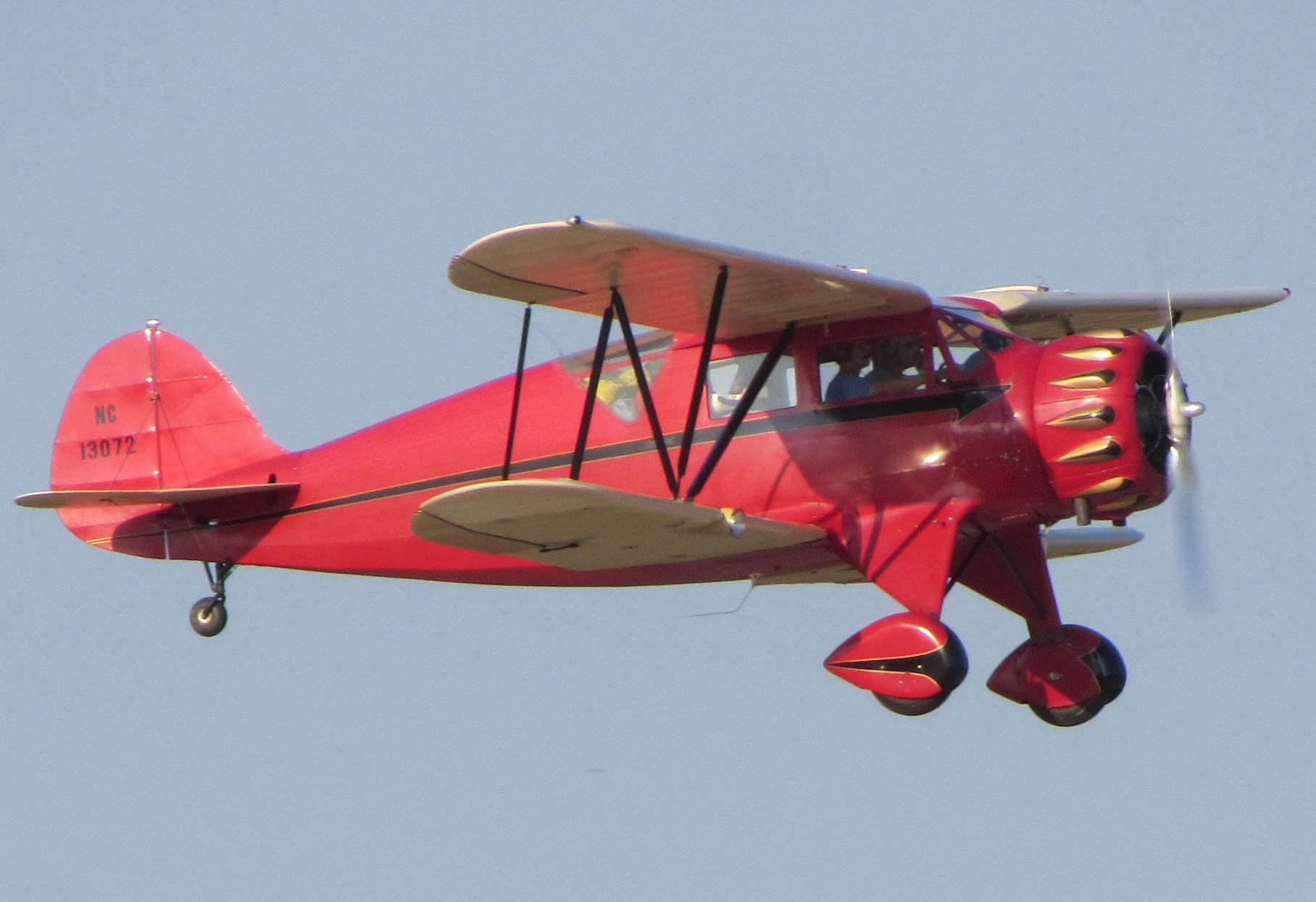
WACO UIC

UIC
210 hp (157 kW) Continental R-670 engine. 83 built.

==== JC Series ====
CJC
250 hp (186 kW) Wright R-760 engine. 41 CJC, DJC & DJC-S built.
DJC
285 hp (213 kW) Wright R-760 engine.

==== KC Series ====
UKC
210 hp (157 kW) Continental R-670 engine.

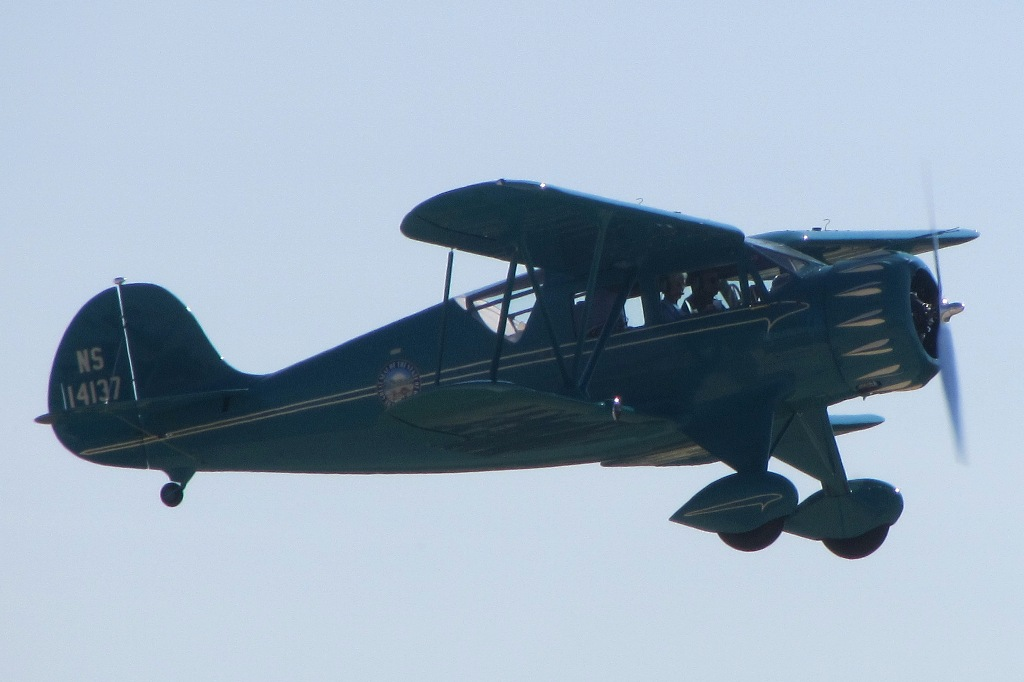
WACO YKC

YKC
225 hp (168 kW) Jacobs L-4 engine. 60 YKC built,

=== No Skylight ===
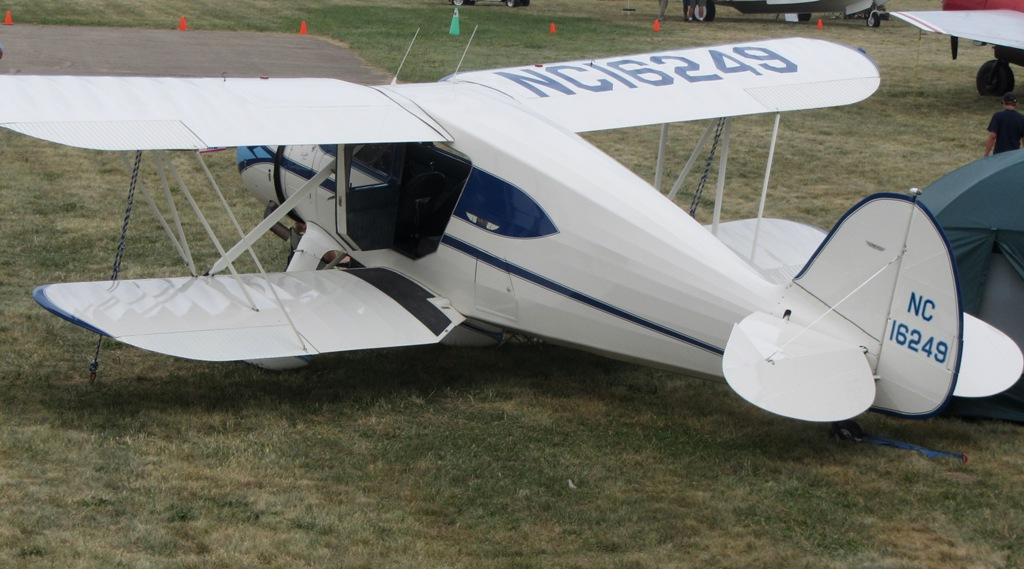
Waco YKS-6. Struts connecting upper and lower ailerons are visible, distinguishing this type from the contemporary Custom Cabin sesquiplanes

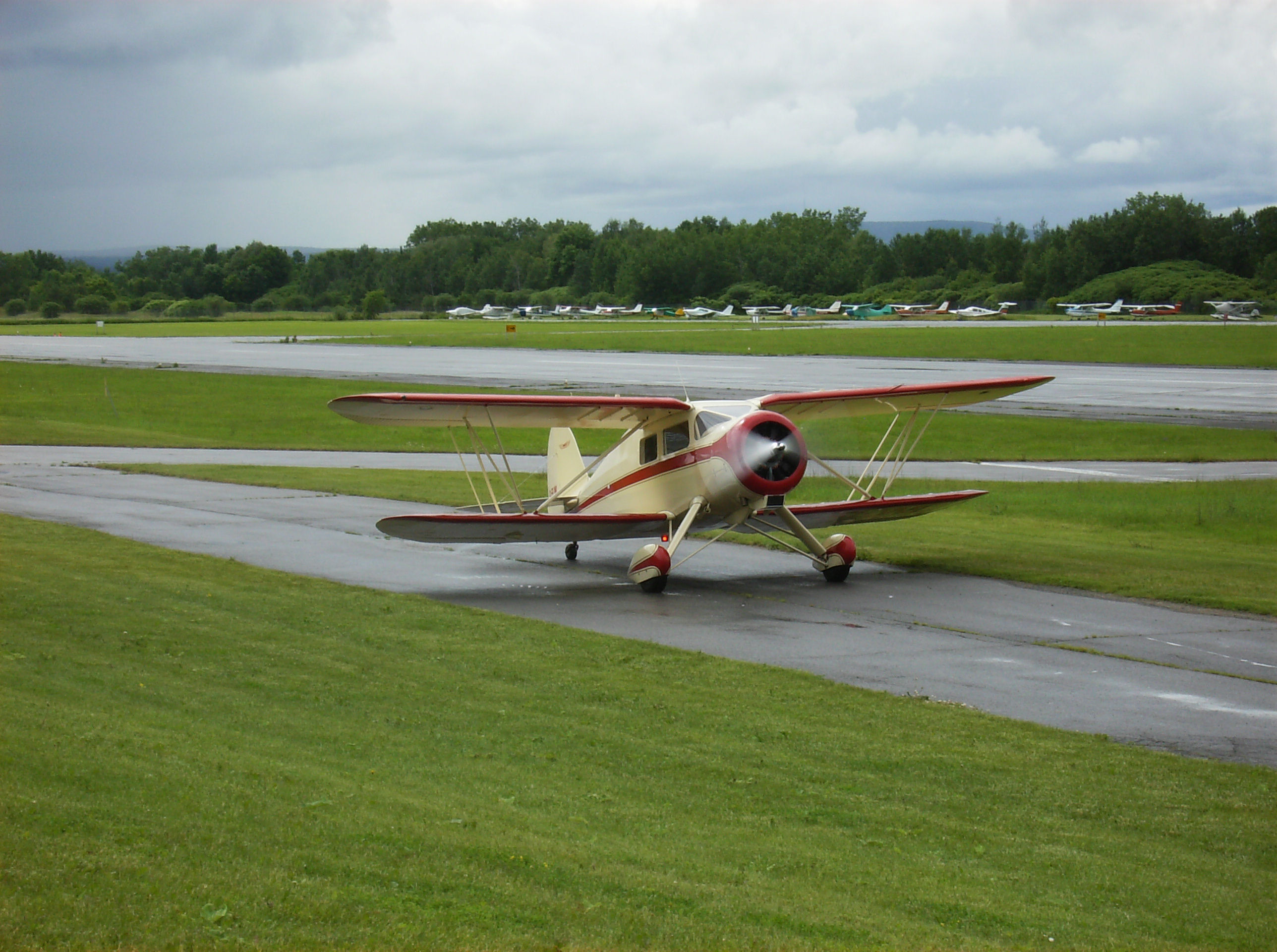
1937 Waco VKS-7, a late Standard Cabin Waco, with no skylights.

==== JC-S Series ====
CJC-S
250 hp (186 kW) Wright R-760 engine.
DJC-S
285 hp (213 kW) Wright R-760 engine.

==== KC-S Series ====
UKC-S
210 hp (157 kW) Continental R-670 engine. 40 built.
YKC-S
225 hp (168 kW) Jacobs L-4 engine. 22 YKC-S built
ZKC-S
285 hp (213 kW) Jacobs L-5 engine.

==== KS Series ====
UKS-6
210 hp (157 kW) Continental R-670 engine. 2 built.
VKS-7
240 hp (179 kW) Continental W-670 engine. 18 built
VKS-7F
Only Standard Cabin with flaps, built for Civilian Pilot Training Program as navigational trainer. F designates use of flaps. 21 built.
YKS-6
225 hp (168 kW) Jacobs L-4 engine. 133 built. 65 YKS-6 built.
ZKS-6 & 7
285 hp (213 kW) Jacobs L-5 engine. 29 built. re-designated from ZKC-S in 1936.
HKS-7
300 hp (224 kW) Lycoming R-680-13 engine, installed with FAA approval.

=== Military designations ===
D2W
Brazilian Navy designation for the CJC.

== Operators ==
=== Military operators ===
Most operators operated either a single example, or a very small number.

Argentina

- Argentine Air Force (8 x VKS-7)

Australia

- Royal Australian Air Force (1 x YQC-6)

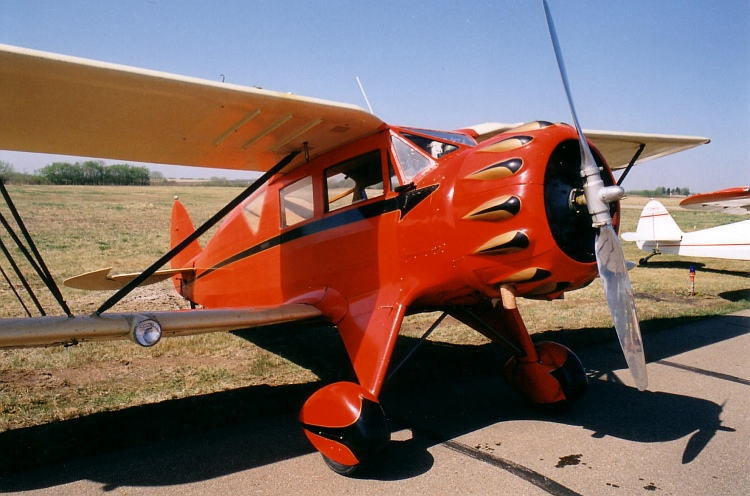
Waco UIC standard cabin biplane

Brazil

- Brazilian Air Force (32 x CJC)

Canada

- Royal Canadian Air Force (1 x YKS-6)

El Salvador

- Salvadoran Air Force (2 x UEC)

Finland

- Finnish Air Force (1 x YKS-7)
  - No. 36 Sqn used a Waco YKS-7 for maritime surveillance during World War II.

Mexico

- Mexican Air Force (1 x UIC)

Netherlands

- Royal Netherlands Air Force (1 x UKC)

New Zealand

- Royal New Zealand Air Force – (1 x QDC, 1 x UIC)

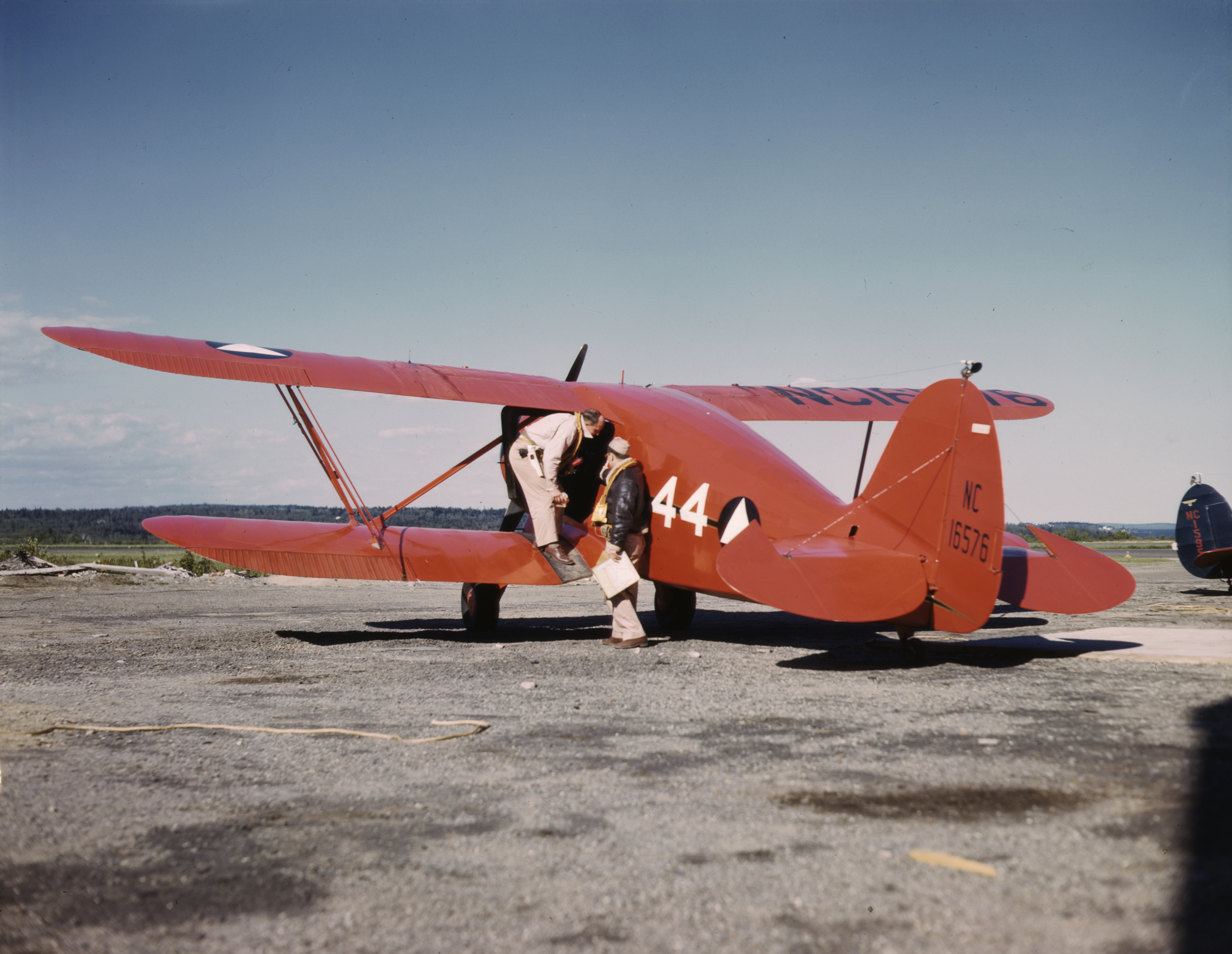
Civil Air Patrol Waco YKS-6 on tarmac in Bar Harbour, Maine

Norway

- Royal Norwegian Air Force (1 x YKS-7)

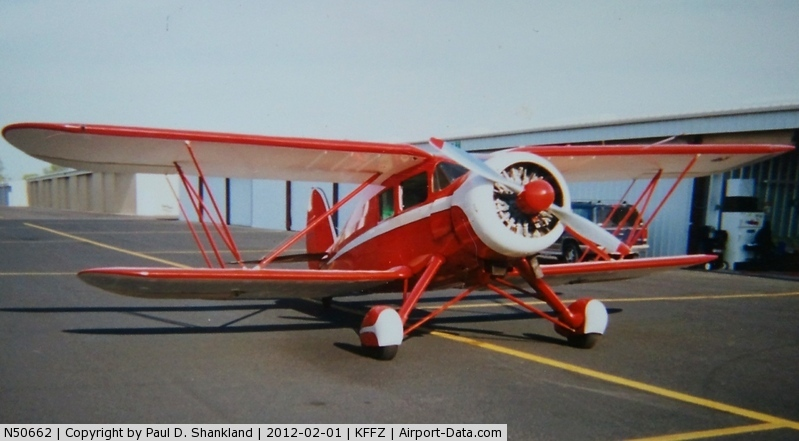
Waco ZKS-7 impressed into WW II service as a UC-72M – then re-engined with Lycoming R-680-13 to become an HKS-7

South Africa

- South African Air Force (UEC, others)

Sweden

- Swedish Air Force (1 x UIC, 1 x UKC, 1)

United Kingdom

- Royal Air Force (1 x YKC)

United States

- United States Army Air Forces (2 x VKS-7 as UC-72D, 1 x YKS-7 as UC-72K & 2 ZKS-7 as UC-72M)
- United States Navy (3x YKS-7 impressed – no USN designation used)
- Civil Air Patrol (despite the name operated armed aircraft in a belligerent manner as a military organization)

=== Civil operators ===
Waco Custom Cabins were used in small numbers by a very large number of individual operators and were registered in the following countries (note that this list is not exhaustive).

Argentina Belgian Congo (now Congo-Kinshasa) Canada Dutch East Indies (now Indonesia) Egypt Finland Germany Guatemala	Honduras Iceland Kenya Mexico Netherlands New Zealand Norway Nyasaland (now Malawi)	Philippines (Portugal) Portuguese Mozambique (now Mozambique) South Africa Southern Rhodesia (now Zimbabwe) Sweden United Kingdom United States Venezuela

== Aircraft on display ==
Aside from the large number of Wacos that continue to exist in private hands, a number have also found their way into museums.

Museum	Location	Type	Identity
Alaska Aviation Heritage Museum	Anchorage, Alaska	YKC	NC14066
Alberta Aviation Museum	Edmonton, Alberta	UIC	CF-AAW
Canada Aviation and Space Museum	Ottawa, Ontario	VKS-7	C-FLWL
Točná Airport	Prague, Czechia	YKS-6	NC16512
EAA AirVenture Museum	Oshkosh, Wisconsin	UEC	NC12472
Golden Wings Flying Museum	Minneapolis, Minnesota	UKC	NC13897
Museu Aeroespacial	Rio de Janeiro, Brazil	CJC	Therezina C66
New England Air Museum	Windsor Locks, Connecticut	YKC-S	NC14614
Paul E. Garber Facility	Suitland, Maryland	UIC	NC13062
Pima Air & Space Museum	Tucson, Arizona	ZKS-6	N16523
Port Townsend Aero Museum	Port Townsend, Washington	YKS-6	NC16517
Museum of Flying	Santa Monica, California	UEC	NC18613
Western Canada Aviation Museum	Winnipeg, Manitoba	YKC-S	CF-AYS
Yanks Air Museum	Chino, California	UEC	NC18613

== Specifications ==
Referenced from Juptner, U.S. Civil Aircraft, 1962, 1974, 1977 and 1980 (dates refer to specific volumes, not editions)

Date	Type	Power	Engine	Length OA	Span (upper)	Span (lower)	Speed (maximum)	Weight (empty)	Weight (max gross)	Load (maximum)	Price (new)	Price (adjusted)
Apr 1931	QDC	165 hp (123 kW)	Continental A-70-2	23'2"(7.06m)	33'3"(10.13m)	28'2"(8.59m)	116 mph (187 km/h)	1,530 lb (694 kg)	2,507 lb (1,137 kg)	977 lb (443 kg)	$5,985	$126,707
Mar 1932	UEC	210 hp (157 kW)	Continental R-670	24'8"(7.52m)	33'3"(10.13m)	28'2"(8.59m)	133 mph (214 km/h)	1,670 lb (758 kg)	2,700 lb (1,225 kg)	1,030 lb (470 kg)	$5,985	$141,231
Mar 1932	OEC	210 hp (157 kW)	Kinner C-5-210	24'9"(7.54m)	33'3"(10.13m)	28'2"(8.59m)	133 mph (214 km/h)	1,667 lb (756 kg)	2,700 lb (1,225 kg)	1,033 lb (469 kg)	$5,985	$141,231
Apr 1932	BEC	165 hp (123 kW)	Wright R-540	24'10"(7.57m)	33'3"(10.13m)	28'2"(8.59m)	120 mph (193 km/h)	1,650 lb (748 kg)	2,650 lb (1,202 kg)	1,000 lb (450 kg)	unknown	
Mar 1933	UIC	210 hp (157 kW)	Continental R-670	25'2"(7.67m)	33'3"(10.13m)	28'3"(8.61m)	140 mph (225 km/h)	1,690 lb (767 kg)	2,800 lb (1,270 kg)	1,110 lb (500 kg)	$5,985	$148,856
Mar 1933	UIC	210 hp (157 kW)	Continental R-670	28'11"(8.81m)	33'3"(10.13m)	28'3"(8.61m)	126 mph (203 km/h)	2,079 lb (943 kg)	3,250 lb (1,474 kg)	1,171 lb (531 kg)	unknown	
Mar 1934	UKC	210 hp (157 kW)	Continental R-670-A	25'3"(7.70m)	33'3"(10.13m)	28'3"(8.61m)	143 mph (230 km/h)	1,745 lb (792 kg)	2,850 lb (1,293 kg)	1,105 lb (501 kg)	$6,285	$151,262
Mar 1934	UKC	210 hp (157 kW)	Continental R-670-A	28'10"(8.79m)	33'3"(10.13m)	28'3"(8.61m)	126 mph (203 km/h)	2,131 lb (967 kg)	3,250 lb (1,474 kg)	1,119 lb (508 kg)	unknown	
Apr 1934	YKC	225 hp (168 kW)	Jacobs L-4	25'4"(7.72m)	33'3"(10.13m)	28'3"(8.61m)	149 mph (240 km/h)	1,800 lb (817 kg)	2,850 lb (1,293 kg)	1,050 lb (480 kg)	$6,450	$155,233
Apr 1934	YKC	225 hp (168 kW)	Jacobs L-4	28'10"(8.79m)	33'3"(10.13m)	28'3"(8.61m)	130 mph (209 km/h)	2,186 lb (992 kg)	3,250 lb (1,474 kg)	1,064 lb (483 kg)	unknown	
May 1934	CJC	250 hp (186 kW)	Wright R-760-E	25'8"(7.82m)	34'10"(10.62m)	28'3"(8.61m)	152 mph (245 km/h)	1,976 lb (896 kg)	3,200 lb (1,452 kg)	1,224 lb (555 kg)	$8,365	$201,322
May 1934	CJC	250 hp (186 kW)	Wright R-760-E	28'10"(8.79m)	34'10"(10.62m)	28'3"(8.61m)	132 mph (212 km/h)	2,296 lb (1,041 kg)	3,650 lb (1,656 kg)	1,354 lb (614 kg)	unknown	
1935	UKC-S	210 hp (157 kW)	Continental R-670-A	25'3"(7.70m)	33'3"(10.13m)	28'3"(8.61m)	138 mph (222 km/h)	1,720 lb (780 kg)	3,000 lb (1,361 kg)	1,280 lb (580 kg)	$5,225	$122,699
1935	YKC-S	225 hp (168 kW)	Jacobs L-4	25'4"(7.72m)	33'3"(10.13m)	28'3"(8.61m)	143 mph (230 km/h)	1,773 lb (804 kg)	3,000 lb (1,361 kg)	1,227 lb (557 kg)	$5,490	$128,922
1935	CJC-S	250 hp (186 kW)	Wright R-760-E	25'8"(7.82m)	34'10"(10.62m)	28'3"(8.61m)	152 mph (245 km/h)	1,941 lb (880 kg)	3,200 lb (1,452 kg)	1,359 lb (616 kg)	$7,000	$164,381
1936	YKS-6	225 hp (168 kW)	Jacobs L-4	25'4"(7.72m)	33'3"(10.13m)	28'3"(8.61m)	144 mph (232 km/h)	1,809 lb (821 kg)	3,250 lb (1,474 kg)	1,441 lb (654 kg)	$4,995	$115,891
Feb 1937	YKS-7	225 hp (168 kW)	Jacobs L-4M/MB	25'3"(7.70m)	33'3"(10.13m)	28'3"(8.61m)	146 mph (235 km/h)	1,882 lb (854 kg)	3,250 lb (1,474 kg)	1,368 lb (621 kg)	$5,695	$127,544
Feb 1937	ZKS-7	285 hp (213 kW)	Jacobs L-5	25'3"(7.70m)	33'3"(10.13m)	28'3"(8.61m)	153 mph (246 km/h)	1,928 lb (875 kg)	3,250 lb (1,474 kg)	1,322 lb (600 kg)	$6,135	$137,398
1939, 1947	HKS-7	300 hp (224 kW)	Lycoming R680-13	25'3"(7.70m)	33'3"(10.13m)	28'3"(8.61m)	168 mph (270 km/h)	2,020 lb (916 kg)	3,250 lb (1,474 kg)	1,322 lb (600 kg)	$7,600	$175,909
Jun 1937	UKS-7	225 hp (168 kW)	Continental W-670K	25'3"(7.70m)	33'3"(10.13m)	28'3"(8.61m)	147 mph (237 km/h)	1,907 lb (865 kg)	3,250 lb (1,474 kg)	1,343 lb (609 kg)	$5,890	$131,911
Jun 1937	VKS-7	240 hp (179 kW)	Continental W-670M	25'3"(7.70m)	33'3"(10.13m)	28'3"(8.61m)	149 mph (240 km/h)	1,917 lb (870 kg)	3,250 lb (1,474 kg)	1,333 lb (605 kg)	$5,890	$131,911
1938	VKS-7	240 hp (179 kW)	Continental W-670M	25'3"(7.70m)	33'3"(10.13m)	28'3"(8.61m)	145 mph (233 km/h)	1,960 lb (889 kg)	3,250 lb (1,474 kg)	1,290 lb (585 kg)	$7,770	$174,016
Jun 1937	VKS-7F	240 hp (179 kW)	Continental W-670M	25'3"(7.70m)	33'3"(10.13m)	28'3"(8.61m)	145 mph (233 km/h)	2,256 lb (1,023 kg)	3,250 lb (1,474 kg)	994 lb (451 kg)	$12,500	$279,948

== See also ==
Related development

- Waco S series
- Waco Custom Cabin Series

Aircraft of comparable role, configuration, and era

- Avro 639 Cabin Cadet
- Avro 641 Commodore
- Beechcraft Model 17 Staggerwing
- Bristol Type 110A
- Canadian Vickers Vanessa
- Stinson SB-1 Detroiter
- Tachikawa KKY-2

Related lists

- List of civil aircraft
- List of aircraft of World War II
