= Lascurain Aura =

Mexican-designed regional airliner

General information
- Type: Regional airliner / Utility aircraft
- National origin: Mexico
- Manufacturer: Ángel Lascurain y Osio
- Designer: Ángel Lascurain y Osio & Juan Cortina Portilla
- Status: Destroyed
- Number built: 1

History
- First flight: 1957

The Lascurain Aura was a prototype of a regional aircraft designed and built for Mexican engineer Angel Lascurain. It was the largest aircraft designed and built in Mexico.

== Development ==
Lascurain wanted to manufacture an aircraft designed for the regional airlines of some parts of Mexico that required connecting populations in very rugged geographical areas that had no access to any other type of transport than the aerial and the rugged terrain caused the airstrips to be very short for the American and European aircraft of those times.

Lascurain determined that regional airlines required a twin-engine plane with fixed landing gear that was accessible (since foreign aircraft cost more than one million pesos and airlines could not pay for them), capable of landing at low speed on short runways. The aircraft had to have a high rate of climb to overcome the mountainous areas.

In 1955 Ángel Lascurain went with the architect Juan Cortina Portilla, beginning the design of the aircraft based on the turkey buzzard, a bird for which Lascurain felt fascination.

== Design ==
The aircraft was a twin-engine monoplane with a mid-wing monocoque fuselage built in duralumin that was capable of holding 12 people in 2 rows of 6 seats plus a bathroom lobby, with the option of 14 seats without the bathroom, all this without counting the two pilots. The fuselage was part of the wings through beams that extended to the ends of the same, this in order to protect passengers and pilots in case of accident. Each wing had between the engine and the fuselage 2 compartments for luggage of 0.65 cubic meters each, the aircraft had 2 tanks of fuel of 200 liters each that fed to the Jacobs R-755 engines by means of gravity and pumps besides 2 tanks auxiliaries located at the ends of the wings of 50 liters each.

== Accident ==
On December 24, 1957, the aircraft took off from Mexico City International Airport on a test flight with two people on board, one of whom was Lascurian. Both engines failed shortly after takeoff, and the pilot, Carlos Castillo Segura, tried to return to the airport. However, the plane struck a ditch and became inverted, impacting terrain and killing Lascurian and Segura.

== Specifications ==
General characteristics

- Crew: two
- Capacity: 12 or 14 passengers
- Length: 40 ft 1 in (12.22 m)
- Wingspan: 68 ft 3 in (20.8 m)
- Height: 14 ft 10 in (4.51 m)
- Gross weight: 4,409 lb (2,000 kg)
- Fuel capacity: 132 gal. (500 L) (with reserves)
- Powerplant: 2 × Jacobs R-755-A1 7-cyl. air-cooled radial piston engine, 245 hp (183 kW) each

Performance

- Maximum speed: 120 kn (140 mph, 220 km/h)
- Cruise speed: 107 kn (123 mph, 198 km/h) at 75% thrust
- Minimum control speed: 30 kn (35 mph, 56 km/h)
- Range: 430 nmi (500 mi, 800 km)
- Service ceiling: 26,900 ft (8,200 m)
- Rate of climb: 1,033 ft/min (5.25 m/s)
