= Funk F-23 =

American agricultural aircraft

F-23
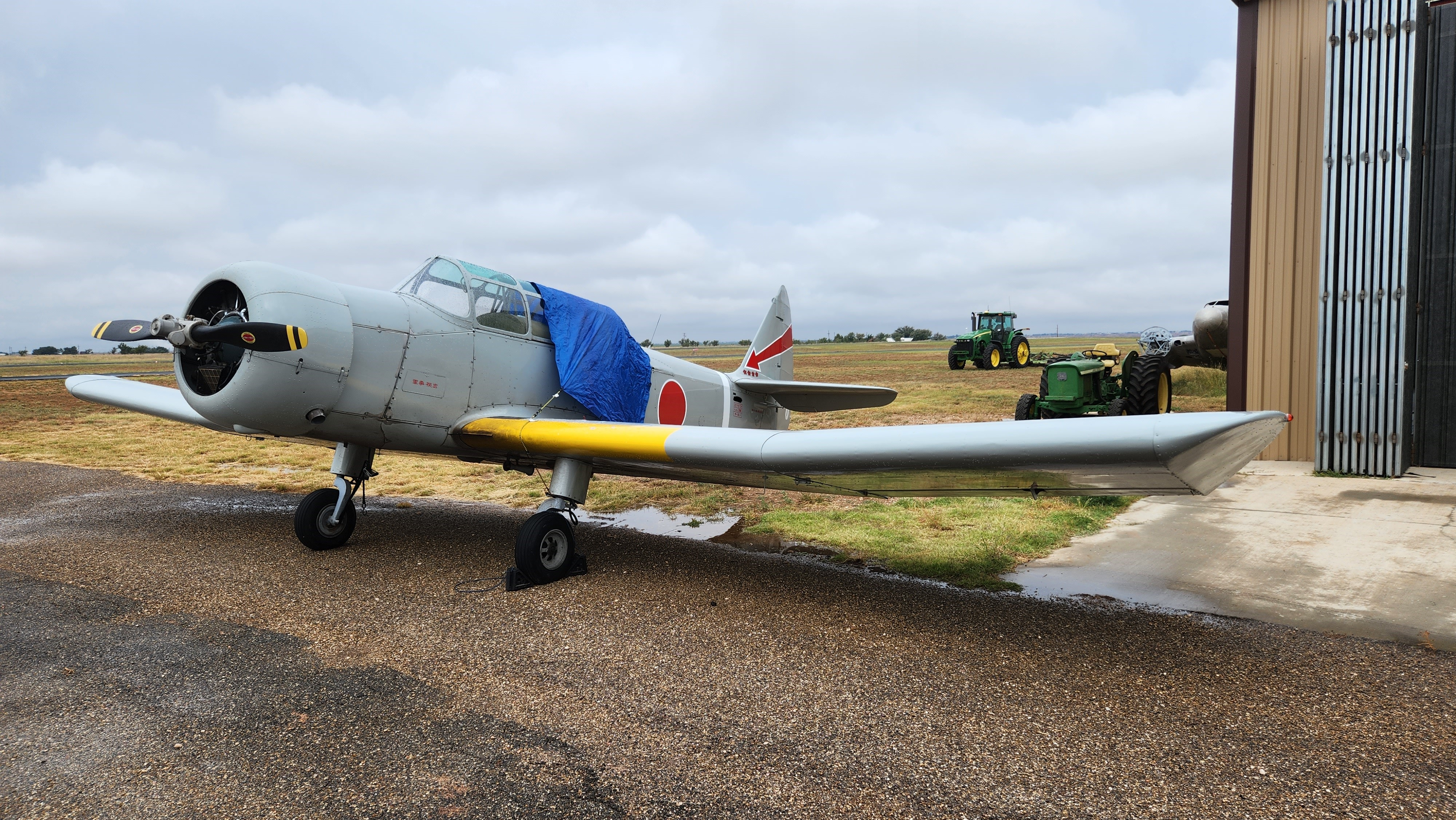

General information
- Type: Agricultural aircraft
- Manufacturer: Funk
- Designer: Donald Funk
- Number built: 15

History
- First flight: November 1962

The Funk F-23 was an agricultural aircraft produced in the United States during the 1960s. It was designed by Donald Funk using the fuselage frame of military surplus Fairchild PT-23 trainers as a starting point. The resulting aircraft was a low-wing cantilever monoplane with fixed, tailwheel undercarriage and all-metal construction. The main structural changes were in the wing, which had all-new outer panels. The space occupied by the forward cockpit of the PT-23 was used to accommodate a 200 U.S. gallon (757 litre) hopper for chemicals. Production continued until 1970, when manufacturing rights to the design were purchased by Cosmic Aircraft. The new owner, however, produced no further examples of the type.

== Variants ==
- F-23 - prototype (1 built)
- F-23A - production version with Continental W670-M engine (11 built)
- F-23B - production version with Jacobs R-755 engine (3 built)

== Specifications (F-23A) ==
Data from Jane's All The World's Aircraft 1969–70

General characteristics

- Crew: One pilot
- Capacity: 215 US gal (179 imp gal; 810 L)
- Length: 26 ft 4 in (8.03 m)
- Wingspan: 40 ft 6 in (12.34 m)
- Height: 8 ft 6 in (2.59 m)
- Wing area: 280 sq ft (26 m^{2})
- Empty weight: 2,250 lb (1,021 kg)
- Gross weight: 4,300 lb (1,950 kg)
- Fuel capacity: 47 US gal (39 imp gal; 180 L)
- Powerplant: 1 × Continental W670-M , 240 hp (180 kW)

Performance

- Maximum speed: 115 mph (185 km/h, 100 kn) at sea level
- Cruise speed: 95 mph (153 km/h, 83 kn)
- Stall speed: 57 mph (92 km/h, 50 kn) (power on)
- Range: 350 mi (560 km, 300 nmi) (max fuel, 75% power)
- Service ceiling: 16,500 ft (5,000 m)
- Rate of climb: 350 ft/min (1.8 m/s)
