= Continental R-670 =

Seven-cylinder four-cycle radial aircraft engine

R-670
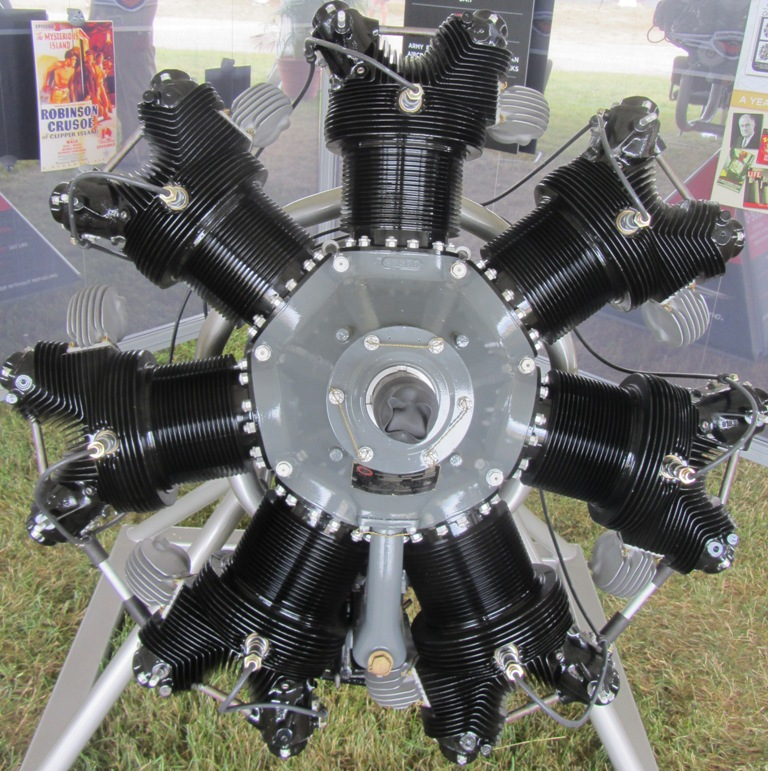
- Continental W670 on display
- Type: Piston aircraft engine
- Manufacturer: Continental Motors
- First run: 1934
- Major applications: PT-17 Stearman; M3 Stuart

The Continental R-670 (factory designation W670) was a seven-cylinder four-stroke radial aircraft engine produced by Continental displacing 668 cubic inches (11 litres) and a dry weight of 465 lb (211 kg). Horsepower varied from 210 to 240 at 2,200 rpm. The engine was the successor to Continental's first radial engine, the 170 hp Continental A-70. This engine was used on many aircraft in the 1930s and 1940s. The R-670 was widely used in the PT-17 Stearman primary training aircraft of the U.S. military. The R-680 received Approved Type Certificate No. 80.

In addition to being used in aircraft, the R-670 was used in a number of light armored vehicles of World War II.

== History ==
The engine was announced in advance of the 1932 National Aircraft Show, with plans for it to be offered with five different models of aircraft.

== Variants ==
R-670-4
Military version of W-670-N
R-670-5
Military version of W-670-6A

R-670-D
Rear exhaust
R-670-E
Rear exhaust
R-670-F
Front exhaust
R-670-G
Front exhaust
R-670-H
Rear exhaust

W-670-6A
Rated at 220 hp (164 kW) at 2,075 rpm. 73 Octane
W670-K
carburetor, 5.4:1 compression, 65 Octane, front exhausts and 225 hp (168 kW)
W670-L
carburetor, 5.4:1 compression, 73 Octane, rear exhausts and 225 hp (168 kW)
W670-M
carburetor, 6.1:1 compression, 80 Octane, front exhausts and 240 hp (179 kW)
W670-N
carburetor, 6.1:1 compression, 80 Octane, rear exhausts and 240 hp (179 kW)
W670-K1
fuel injection, 5.4:1 compression, 73 Octane, front exhausts and 230 hp (172 kW)
W670-L1
fuel injection, 5.4:1 compression, 73 Octane, rear exhausts and 230 hp (172 kW)
W670-M1
fuel injection, 6.1:1 compression, 80 Octane, front exhausts and 250 hp (186 kW)
W670-N1
fuel injection, 6.1:1 compression, 80 Octane, rear exhausts and 250 hp (186 kW)

== Applications ==
=== Aircraft ===
- American Airmotive NA-75
- Boeing-Stearman Model 75 (PT-17, N2S)
- CallAir Model A
- Cessna 190
- Eagle Aircraft Eagle 220
- Fairchild PT-23
- Funk F-23
- G class blimp
- Grumman G-164 Ag Cat
- Kellett K-2A, K-4
- Morane-Saulnier MS.317
- Timm N2T Tutor
- Waco 240-A
- Waco Standard Cabin series (UEC, UIC, UKC, UKC-S, UKS, VKS)
- Waco Custom Cabin series (UOC, VQC)
- Waco A series (UBA, ULA)
- Waco F series (UBF, UMF, UPF)

=== Armored fighting vehicles ===
- T2 Combat Car
- T4 Combat Car
- M1 Combat Car
- M2 Light Tank
- M3 Stuart
- Landing Vehicle Tracked (LVT-2, -4; LVT(A)-1, -2, -4, -5)

== Specifications (R-670-K) ==
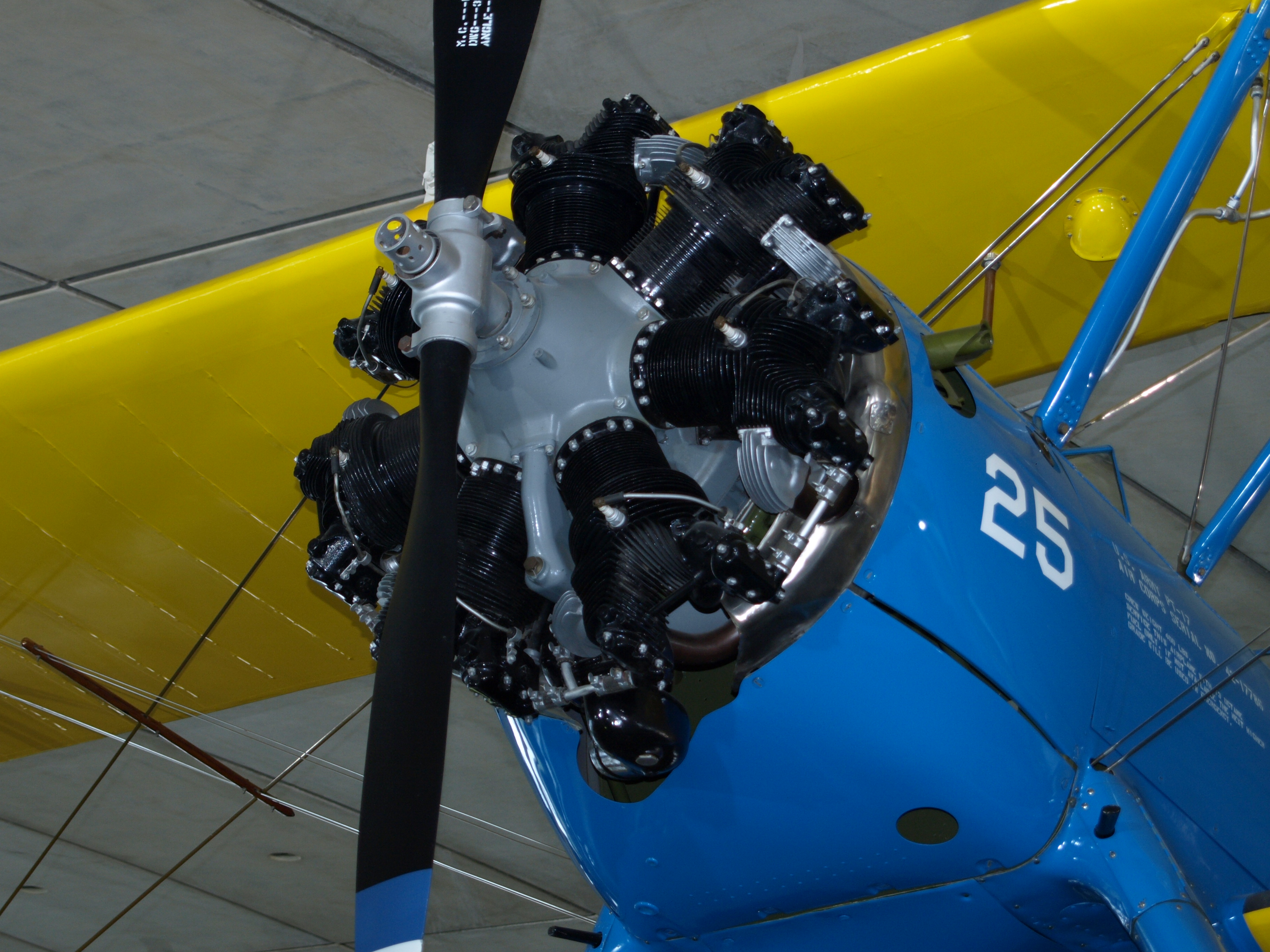
An R-670 fitted to a Boeing Stearman at the Imperial War Museum Duxford

Data from Jane's 1938

=== General characteristics ===
- Type: Seven cylinder air-cooled radial
- Bore: 5 1/8 in (130.2 mm)
- Stroke: 4 5/8 in (117.5 mm)
- Displacement: 668 cu in (10.95 L)
- Length: 34 3/16 in (868.4 mm)
- Diameter: 42 1/2 in (1,079.5 mm)
- Dry weight: 450 lb (204.1 kg)

=== Components ===
- Valvetrain: 1 inlet and 1 exhaust valve per cylinder
- Fuel system: 1 Stromberg NA-R6 Carburetor
- Fuel type: 65 octane
- Oil system: Dry sump, one pressure pump, one scavenge pump, enclosed valve-train
- Cooling system: Air-cooled

=== Performance ===
- Power output: 225 hp (168 kW) at 2,175 rpm
- Specific power: 0.337 hp/in^{3}
- Compression ratio: 5.4:1
- Fuel consumption: 13 US Gal/hr (49 L/hr) at cruising rpm
- Specific fuel consumption: 0.54 lb/hp/hr (0.328 kg/kW/hr) - at rated rpm
- Oil consumption: 0.4 US Gal/hr (1.5 L/hr) at cruising rpm
- Power-to-weight ratio: 0.49 hp/lb (0.81 kW/kg) at cruising rpm

== See also ==
Comparable engines

- Jacobs R-755
- Lycoming R-680

Related lists

- List of aircraft engines
