= Jacobs R-755 =

225 hp radial aircraft engine

R-755 / L-4
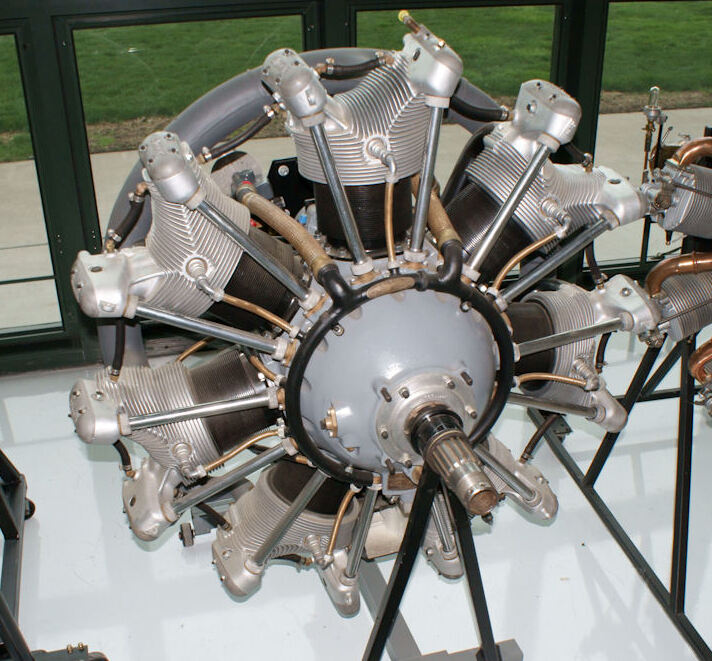
- Jacobs R-755 on display at the Evergreen Aviation & Space Museum
- Type: Radial engine
- Manufacturer: Jacobs Aircraft Engine Company
- First run: 1933

The Jacobs R-755 (company designation L-4) is a seven-cylinder, air-cooled, radial engine for aircraft manufactured in the United States by the Jacobs Aircraft Engine Company.

== Design and development ==
The R-755 was first run in 1933 and was still in production in the 1970s. With a bore and stroke of 5.25 in × 5 in (133 mm × 127 mm) the displacement was 757 cu in (12.4 L), power ranged from 200 hp to 350 hp (150 kW - 260 kW). The engine features steel cylinders with aluminum-alloy cylinder heads. An R-755E variant was developed for use in helicopters.

It was the first modern radial engine to use a battery ignition.

== Variants ==
L-4
Produced 225 horsepower (168 kW) at 2,000 rpm, dual battery
L-4M
Dual magneto
L-4MA
Dual magneto, for use in autogyros
L-4MA7
Similar to R-755A3, for use in autogyros
L-4MB
Rated at 225 hp (168 kW) at 2,000 rpm.
L-4MBB
Rated at 225 hp (168 kW) at 2,000 rpm.

R-755-7
Rated at 225 hp (168 kW) at 2,000 rpm.
R-755-9
Rated at 225 hp (168 kW) at 2,000 rpm. Military version of the L-4MB.

R-755-A
Replaced the R-755-9. Rated at 300 hp (220 kW) at 2,200 rpm. Increased compression ratio to 6:1.
R-755A1
The base-line direct drive production version. Equivalent to the L-4MB.
R-755A2
300 hp variant.
R-755A3
Similar to A1 but with Scintilla magnetoes. Equivalent to the L-4M.
R-755B1
De-rated version of the R-755A to drive a fixed pitch airscrew.
R-755B2
De-rated version of the R-755A to drive a variable or controllable pitch airscrew.
R-755E
Up-rated engine with reduction gearing.
R-755EH
Developed to power the Jacobs Type 104 Gyrodyne.

== Applications ==
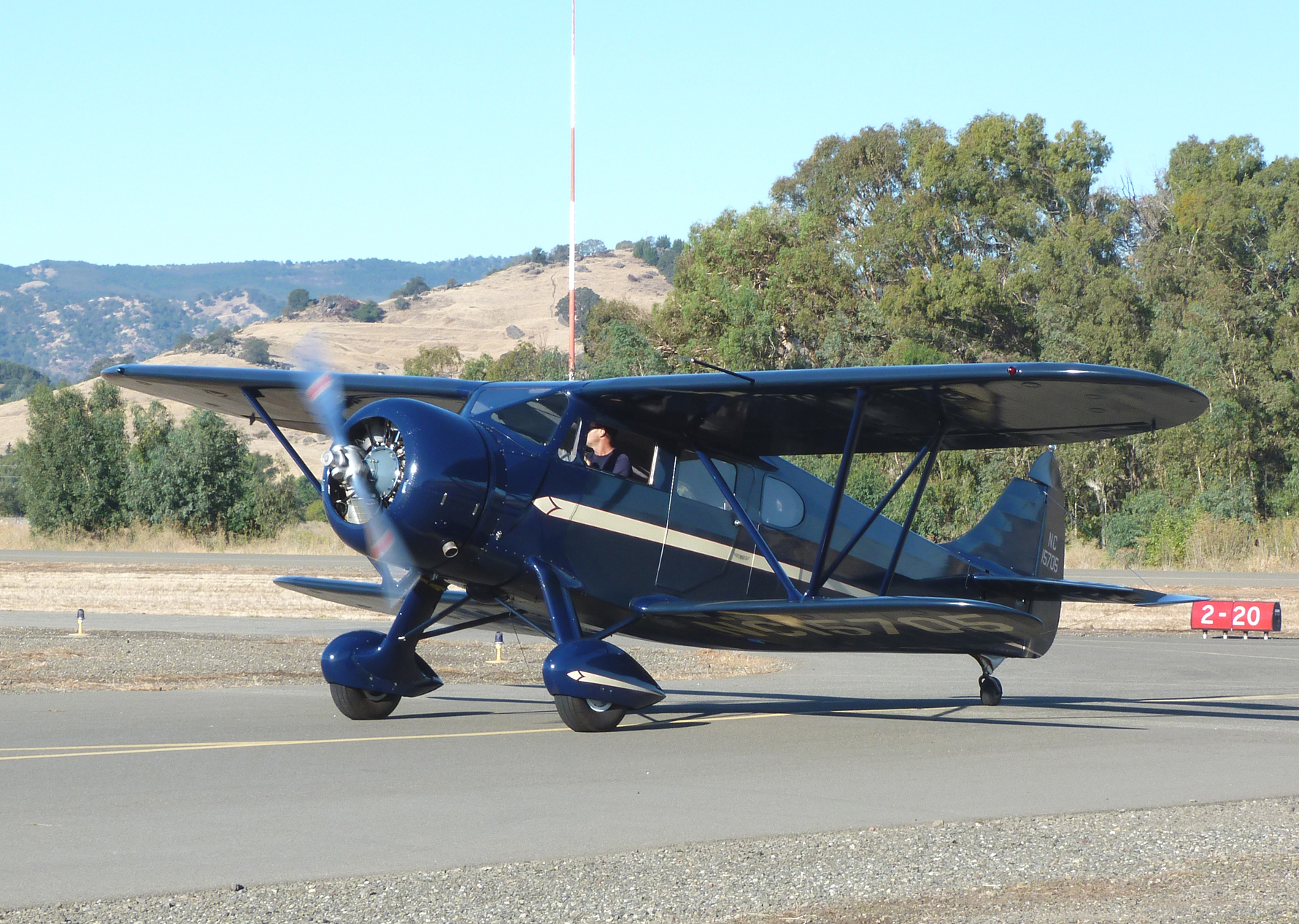
Waco YQC-6

- Anahuac Tauro
- Beechcraft Model 17 Staggerwing (B17L, C17L, E17L)
- Boeing-Stearman PT-18 Kaydet
- Cessna AT-17 Bobcat
- Cessna 195
- Funk F-23
- Grumman G-164 Ag Cat
- Kellett KD-1
- Lascurain Aura
- Morane-Saulnier MS.505 Criquet
- Waco F series (YMF, YPF)
- Waco Custom Cabin series (YOC, YQC)
- Waco Standard Cabin series (YKC, YKC-S, YKS-6)
- Waco PG-3 (twin-engined powered version of Waco CG-15 glider, prototype only)

== Engines on display ==
- A preserved Jacobs R-755 is on display at the Arkansas Air Museum.
- A Jacobs R-755 is on public display at the Aerospace Museum of California

== Specifications (R-755-A1) ==
Data from Jane's fighting aircraft of World War II, Jane's all the World's Aircraft 1938

=== General characteristics ===
- Type: 7-cylinder air-cooled radial piston engine
- Bore: 5.25 in (133 mm)
- Stroke: 5 in (130 mm)
- Displacement: 757 cu in (12.4 L)
- Length: 37 in (940 mm) overall
- Diameter: 43.5 in (1,100 mm)
- Dry weight: 505 lb (229 kg)

=== Components ===
- Valvetrain: 2 valves per cylinder, pushrod-actuated, sodium-cooled exhaust valves
- Fuel system: Single Stromberg NA-R7A carburetor
- Fuel type: 73 octane
- Oil system: One pressure pump, two scavenge pumps
- Cooling system: Air-cooled
- Reduction gear: Direct drive, right hand tractor

=== Performance ===
- Power output: 225 hp (168 kW) at 2,000 rpm at sea level
- Specific power: 0.32 hp/cu-in (14.8 kW/L)
- Power-to-weight ratio: 0.48 hp/lb (0.8 kW/kg)

== See also ==
Comparable engines

- Armstrong Siddeley Cheetah
- Continental R-670
- Lycoming R-680
- Wright R-760

Related lists

- List of aircraft engines
