= Waco F series =

General-aviation and military biplane trainers of the 1930s

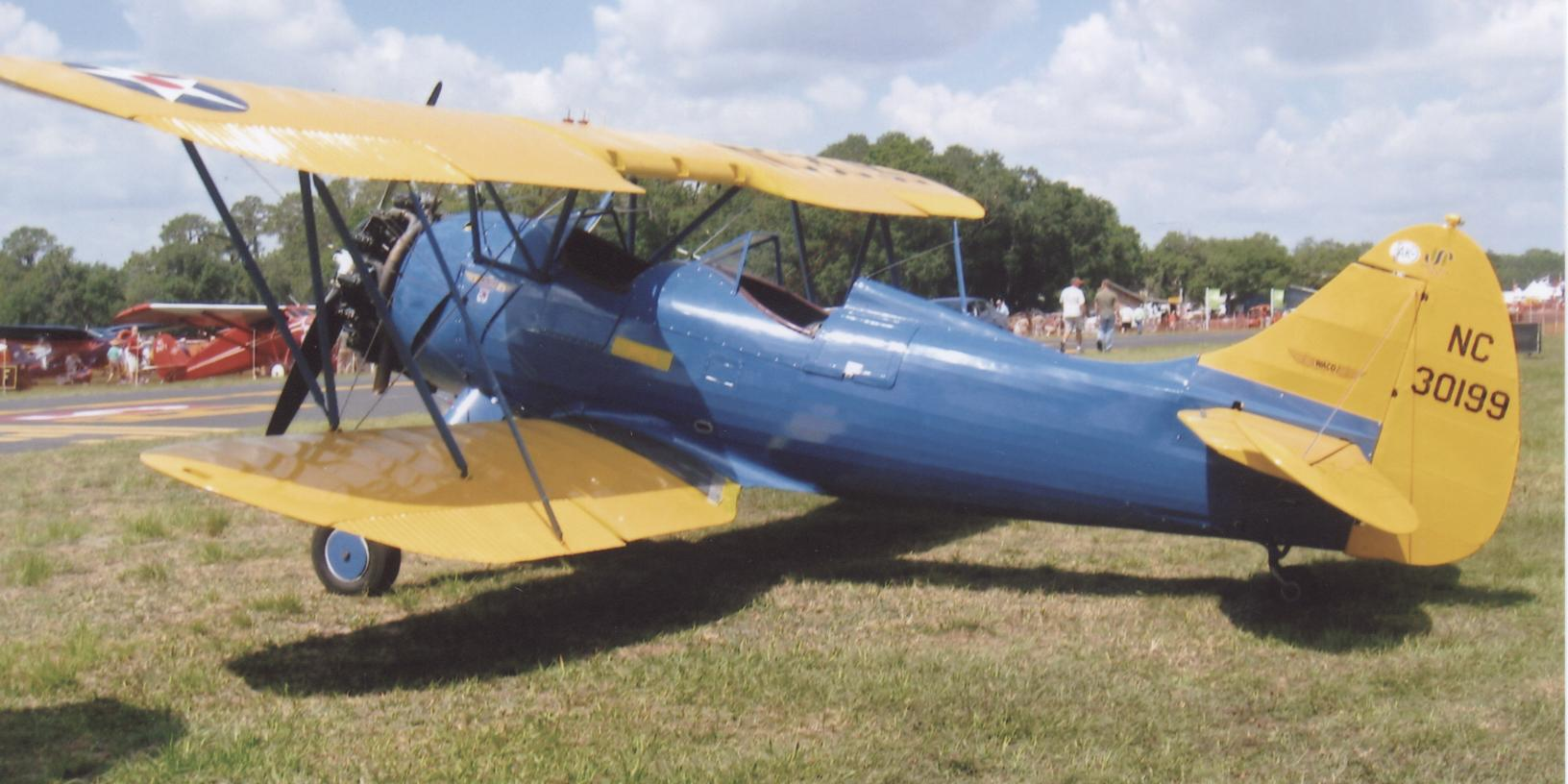
- Ex-US Civilian Pilot Training Program 1941 Waco UPF-7

General information
- Type: Open-cockpit biplane
- National origin: United States
- Manufacturer: Waco Aircraft Company
- Status: YMF-5 in production (2013)
- Primary user: Private pilot owners and training schools

History
- Introduction date: 1930

The Waco F series is a series of American-built general aviation and military biplane trainers of the 1930s from the Waco Aircraft Company.

== Development ==
The Waco 'F' series of biplanes supplanted and then replaced the earlier 'O' series of 1927/33. The 'F' series had an airframe which was smaller and about 450 pounds (200 kg) lighter than the 'O' series, while continuing to provide accommodation for three persons in tandem open cockpits. A similar performance to the earlier model was obtained on the power of smaller and more economical engines.

The initial models were the INF (125 hp (93 kW) Kinner engine), KNF (100 hp (75 kW) Kinner) and the RNF (110 hp (82 kW) Warner Scarab), all of which had externally braced tailwheel undercarriages. Many further sub-models followed with more powerful engines of up to 225 hp (168 kW). The most powerful in the range was the ZPF of 1936/37, intended for executive use.

== Operational history ==
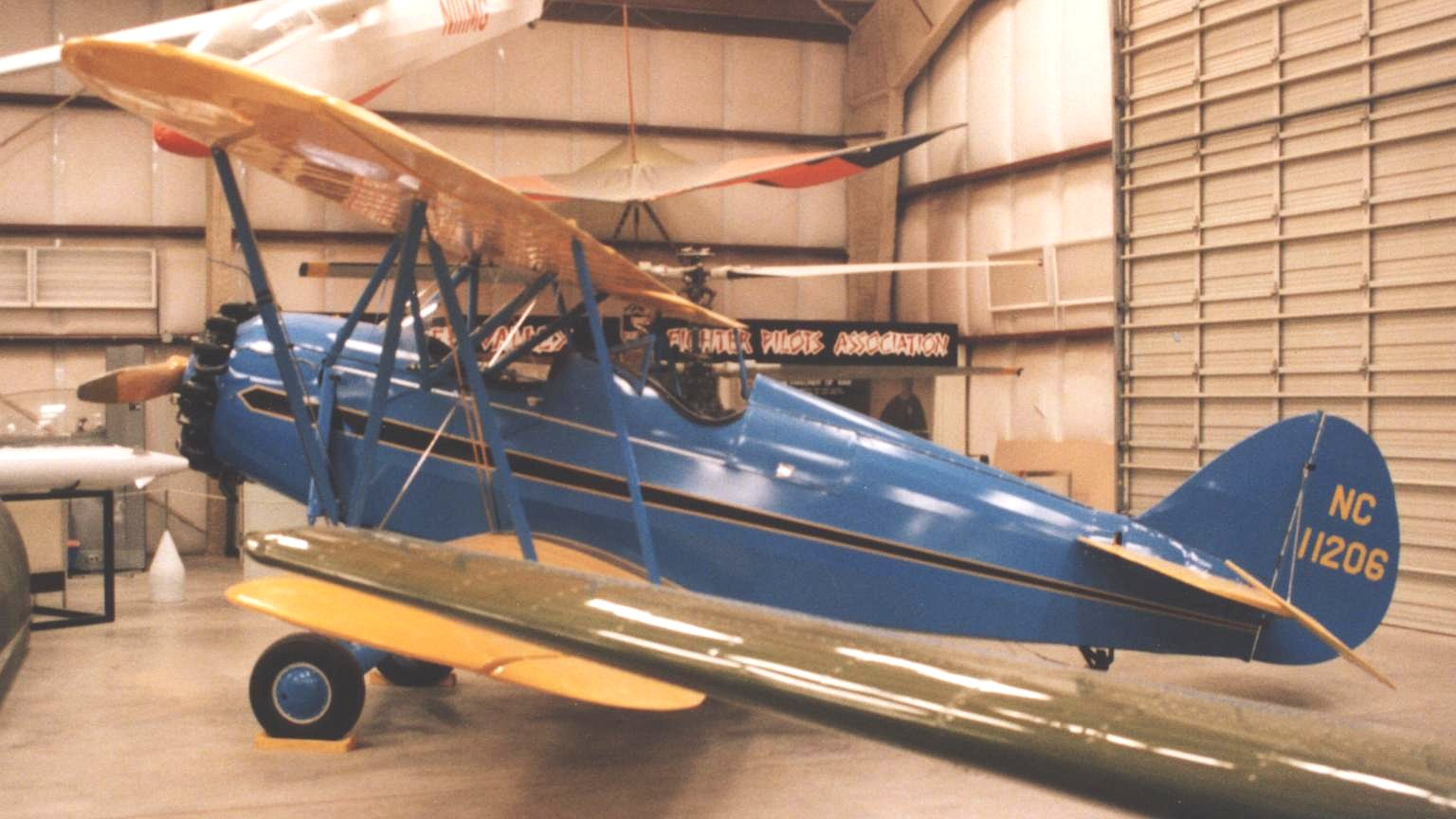
Waco RNF of 1931 displayed at the Pima Air Museum Tucson Arizona in 1991

The 'F' series was popular with private owner pilots for sporting and other uses and continued in production through the late 1930s. The tandem cockpit UPF-7 was adopted by the Civilian Pilot Training Program and continued in production until 1942 by which time over 600 had been built.

The 1934 model YMF was substantially redesigned with a longer and wider fuselage, larger rudder and other structural changes, and put into production in March 1986 by WACO Classic Aircraft of Lansing, Michigan as the YMF-5. Over 150 YMF-5s were completed as of 2017 with new examples being built to specific orders.

The WACO Aircraft Company of Ohio Inc had built three replicas by December 2011, which they designated MF.

Considerable numbers of 'F' series biplanes, both original and newly built, remain in service.

== Variants ==
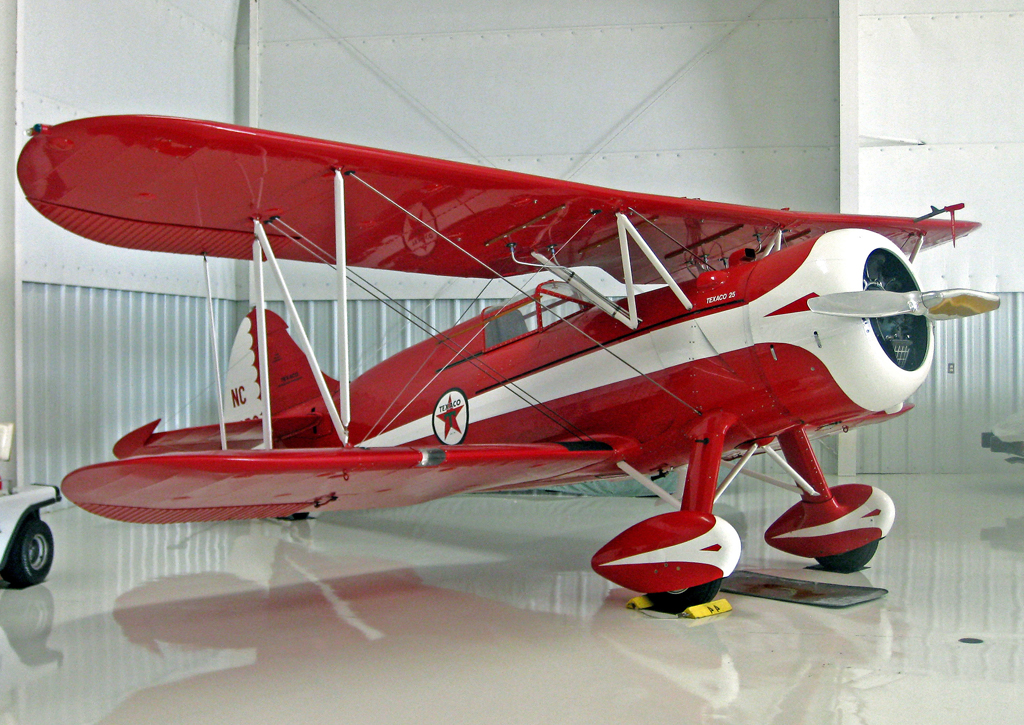
Waco ZPF-6 three-seat executive aircraft built for Texaco Oil in 1936. Preserved airworthy at Sebring, Florida

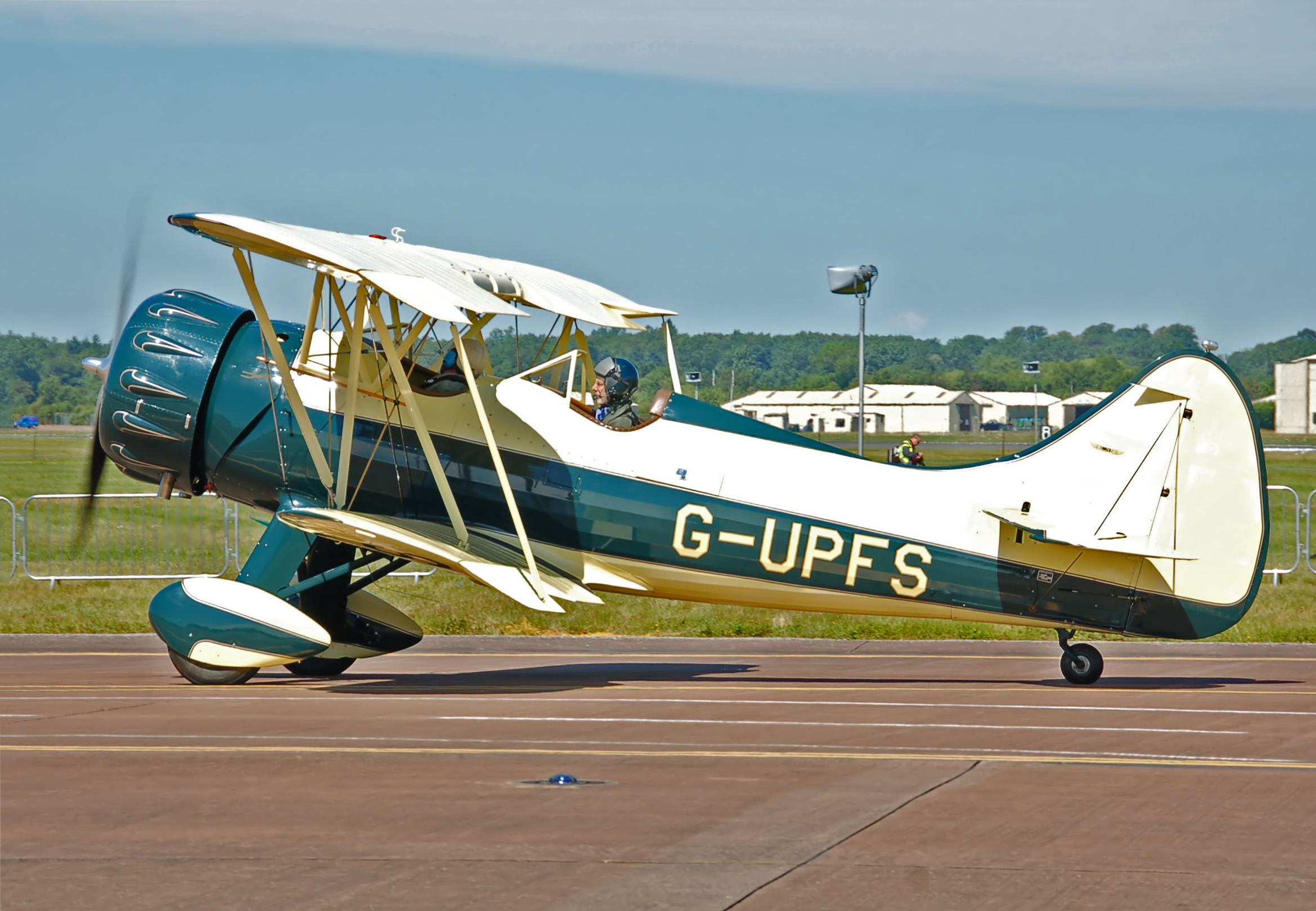
UPF-7, built 1941, arrives at the 2014 Royal International Air Tattoo, England

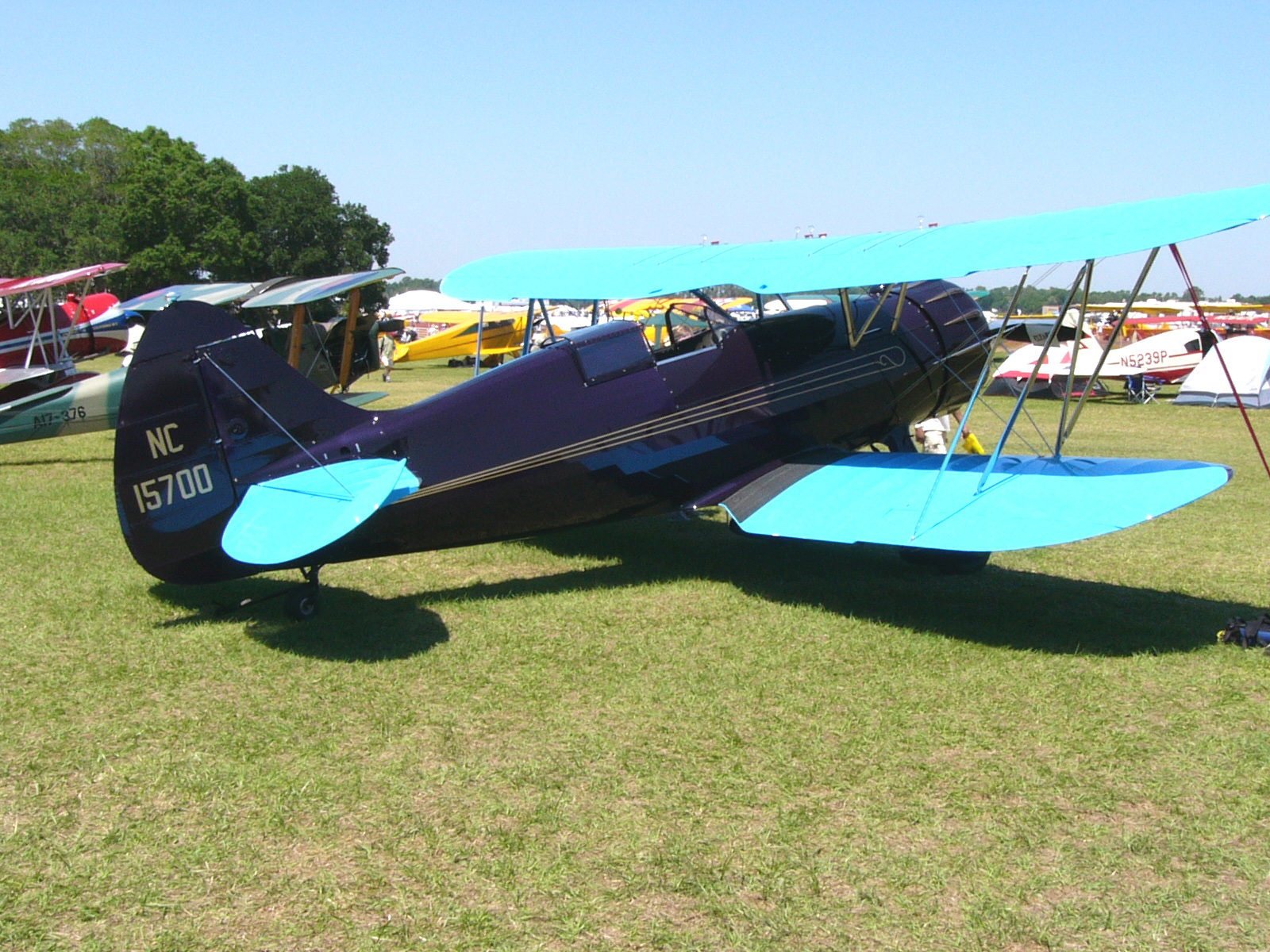
Waco YPF at Sun 'n Fun 2006

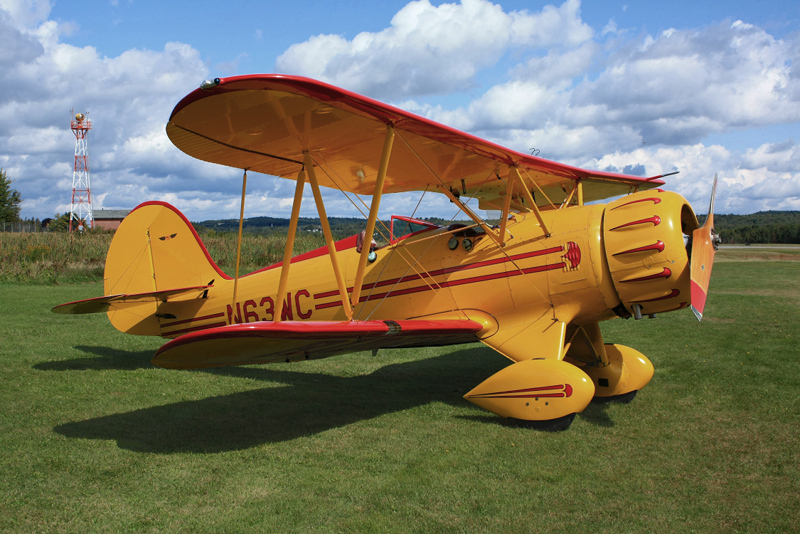
1997 YMF-5C at Hancock County-Bar Harbor Airport, Maine

Listed in approximate chronological order (per Simpson, 2001, p. 573) First letter of designation refers to engine installed. From 1936 Waco added year suffixes to designations—e.g. YPF-6, YPF-7, with the numeral being the last digit of the model year.

INF
125 hp (93 kW) Kinner B-5, certified ATC# 345 on 2 August 1930. At least 50 built.
KNF
100 hp (75 kW) Kinner K-5, certified ATC# 313 on 12 April 1930. At least 20 built.
RNF
110 hp (82 kW) Warner Scarab, certified ATC# 311 on 7 April 1930. About 150 built.
MNF
125 hp (93 kW) Menasco C-4 Pirate, certified ATC #393 on 29 January 1931. Four built.

PCF
170 hp (130 kW) Jacobs LA-1 and new cross-braced undercarriage, PCF-2 certified ATC# 473 on 2 October 1931
PBF
as PCF with 'B' wings
QCF
165 hp (123 kW) Continental A70, QCF-2 certified ATC# 416 on 9 April 1931
UBF
210 hp (160 kW) Continental R-670

UMF
210 hp (160 kW) Continental R-670A and longer and wider fuselage, and larger fin
YMF
225 hp (168 kW) Jacobs L-4, certified ATC# 542 on 29 June 1934. 18 built.

YPF-6 and YPF-7
225 hp (168 kW) Jacobs L-4
ZPF-6 and ZPF-7
285 hp (213 kW) Jacobs L-5
UPF-7
tandem trainer with wide-track undercarriage and 220 hp (160 kW) Continental R-670 (designated PT-14 by the USAAC)

=== Waco Classic Aircraft replicas ===
YMF-5
1986 design roughly based on the YMF, built by WACO Classic Aircraft
YMF-5D
2009 improved YMF-5
YMF-5F
YMF-5 with Aerocet 3400 amphibious floats

=== Military designations ===
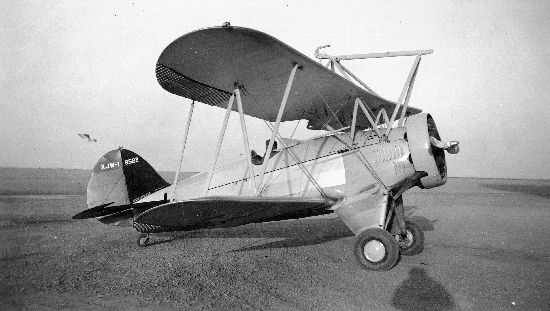
Waco XJW-1

JW-1
Two UBF designated XJW-1 were used by the US Navy as hook trainers for the skyhook airship parasite aircraft program.
PT-14
USAAC/USAAF designation for UPF-7
D3W
Brazilian Navy designation for the CPF-5.

== Operators ==
=== Military operators ===
Guatemala

- Guatemalan Air Force - At least 1 Waco YMF-7 received in 1934. Was still in airworthy condition in 1998.

United States

- United States Army Air Corps - Adopted the UPF-7 as the PT-14, with one XPT-14 and 13 YPT-14s being purchased, with an additional UPF-7 impressed in 1942 as a PT-14A.
- United States Navy

== Specifications (UPF-7) ==
Data from The Aircraft of the World

General characteristics

- Crew: 1
- Capacity: 1 trainee or passenger
- Length: 23 ft 1 in (7.04 m)
- Wingspan: 30 ft 0 in (9.14 m)
- Height: 8 ft 5 in (2.57 m)
- Wing area: 244 sq ft (22.7 m^{2})
- Empty weight: 1,870 lb (848 kg)
- Gross weight: 2,650 lb (1,202 kg)
- Powerplant: 1 × Continental W-670-6A seven cylinder radial , 220 hp (160 kW)

Performance

- Maximum speed: 128 mph (206 km/h, 111 kn)
- Cruise speed: 114 mph (183 km/h, 99 kn)
- Range: 400 mi (640 km, 350 nmi)
- Service ceiling: 14,800 ft (4,500 m)
- Time to altitude: 15 min to 9,000 ft (2,700 m)
