= Waco C-72 =

1942 military utility aircraft series by Waco

C-72 was a blanket designation given to a variety of privately owned Waco enclosed-cabin biplanes pressed into service by the United States Army Air Forces in 1942. In all, 42 aircraft were taken and used for light transport duty wherever needed.

== Variants ==
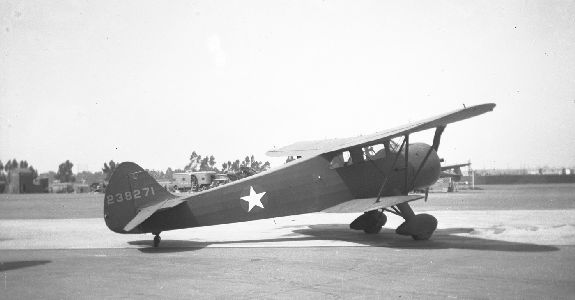
USAAF Waco UC-72 42-38271, formerly Waco SRE NC20961, at Hammer Field

UC-72
12 impressed civil Waco SRE, powered by a 400 hp (298 kW) Pratt & Whitney R-985-33 Wasp Junior.
UC-72A
One impressed civil Waco ARE, powered by a 300 hp (224 kW) Jacobs R-915-1 (Jacobs L-6-1).
UC-72B
Four impressed civil Waco EGC-8, powered by a 350 hp (261 kW) Wright R-760-E2 Whirlwind.
UC-72C
Two impressed civil Waco HRE, powered by a 300 hp (224 kW) Lycoming R-680-9.
UC-72D
Two impressed civil Waco VKS-7, powered by a 240 hp (179 kW) Continental R-670-3 (Continental W-670-3).
UC-72E
Four impressed civil Waco ZGC-7, powered by a 285 hp (213 kW) Jacobs R-830-1 (Jacobs L-5-1).
UC-72F
One impressed civil Waco CUC-1, powered by a 250 hp (186 kW) Wright R-760E Whirlwind.
UC-72G
One impressed civil Waco AQC-6, powered by a 300 hp (224 kW) Jacobs R-915-1.
UC-72H
Five impressed civil Waco ZQC-6, powered by a 285 hp (213 kW) Jacobs R-830-1.
UC-72J
Three impressed civil Waco AVN-8, powered by a 300 hp (224 kW) Jacobs R-915-1.

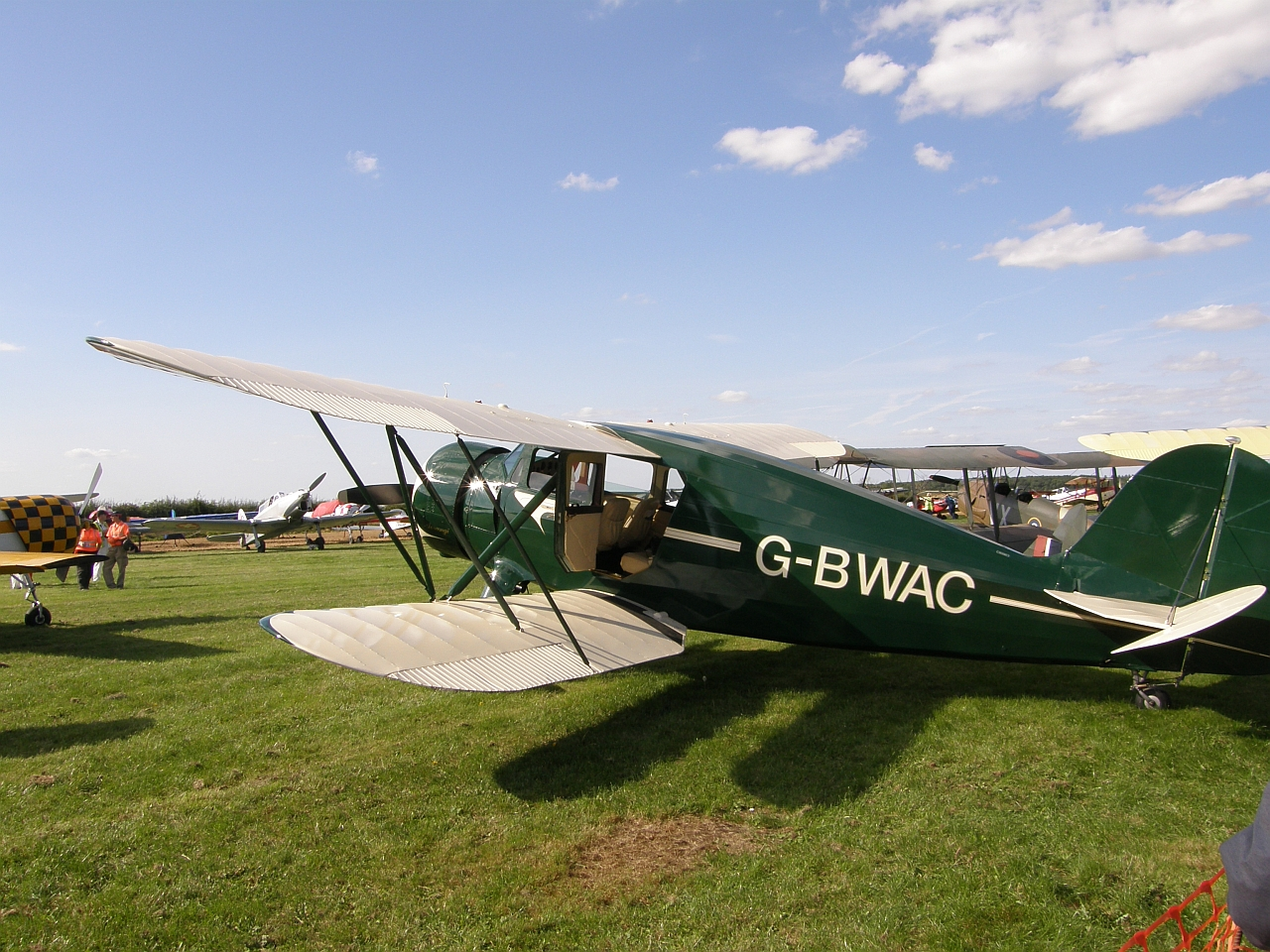
Waco YKS-7 that has been further modified, shown here in 2007

UC-72K
Two impressed civil Waco YKS-7, powered by a 225 hp (168 kW) Jacobs R-755-1 (Jacobs L-4-1).
UC-72L
One impressed civil Waco ZVN-8, powered by a 285 hp (213 kW) Jacobs R-830-1.
UC-72M
Two impressed civil Waco ZKS-7, powered by a 285 hp (213 kW) Jacobs R-830-1. One later factory retrofitted with a 300 hp (224 kW) Lycoming R-680-13.
UC-72N
One impressed civil Waco YOC-1, powered by a 285 hp (213 kW) Jacobs R-830-1.
UC-72P
Two impressed civil Waco AGC-8, powered by a 300 hp (224 kW) Jacobs R-915-1.
UC-72Q
One impressed civil Waco ZQC-6, powered by a 285 hp (213 kW) Jacobs R-830-1.
