= Waco Aircraft Company =

1919-1947 American aircraft manufacturer

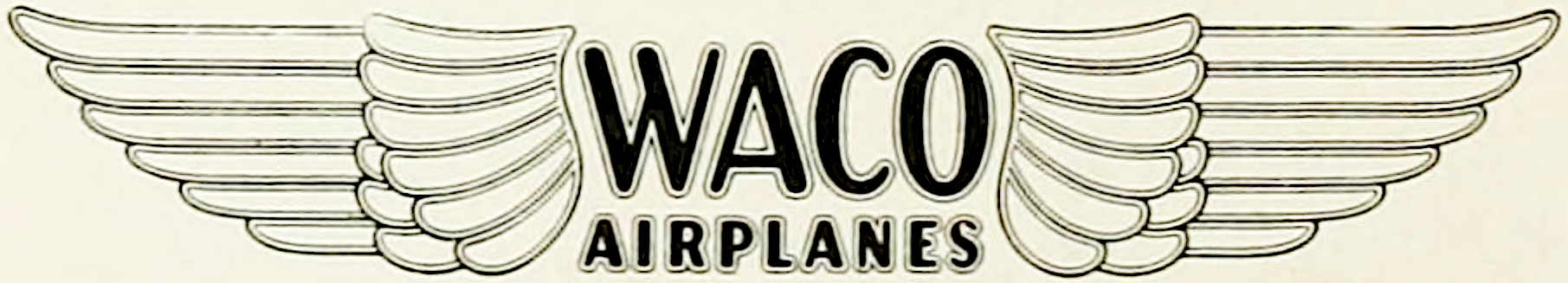
- Formerly: Weaver Aircraft Company
- Industry: Aerospace
- Founded: 1920
- Defunct: 1947
- Headquarters: Troy, Ohio, United States
- Website: https://www.wacoaircraft.com/

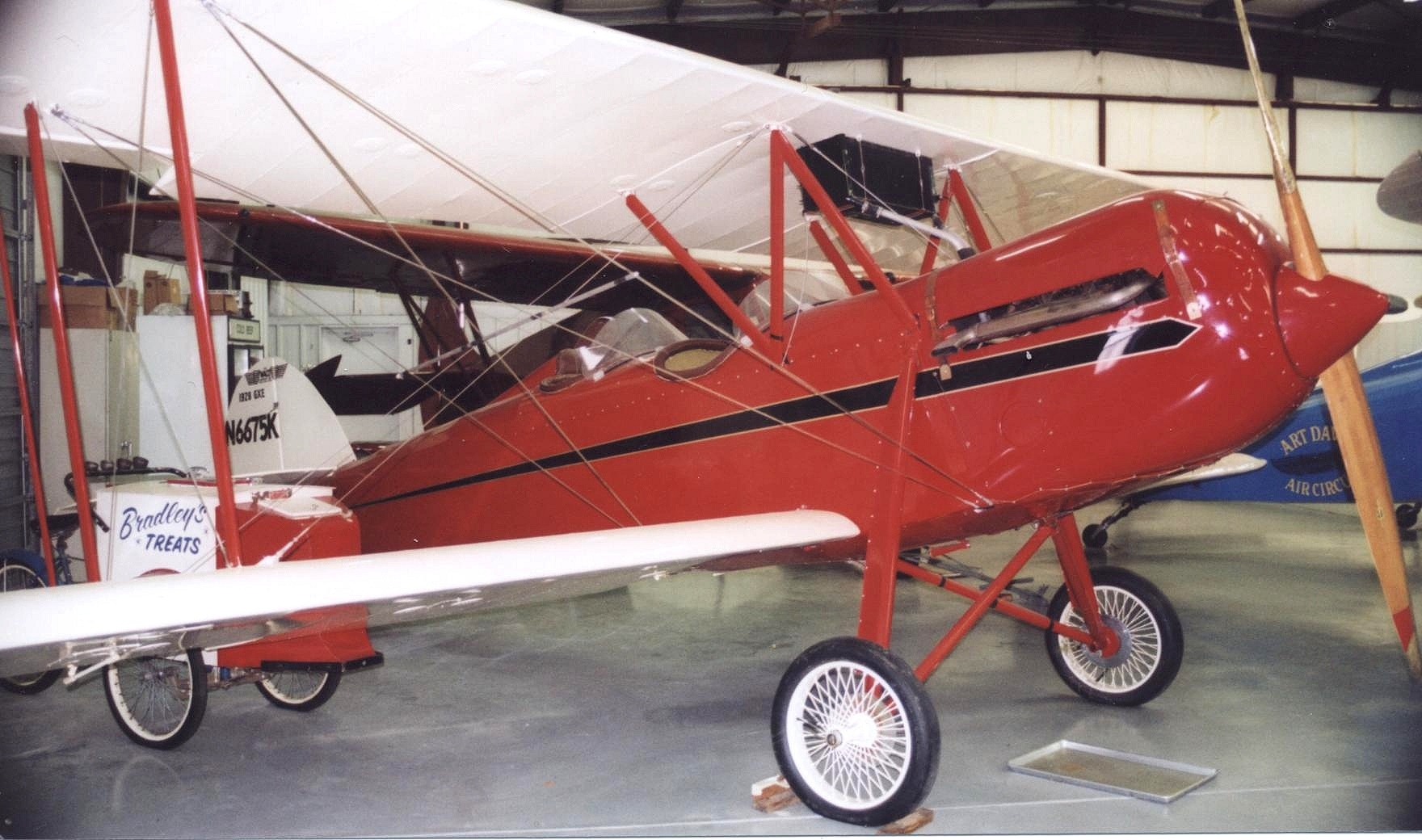
Waco GXE (Model 10) of 1928 with Curtiss OX-5 engine

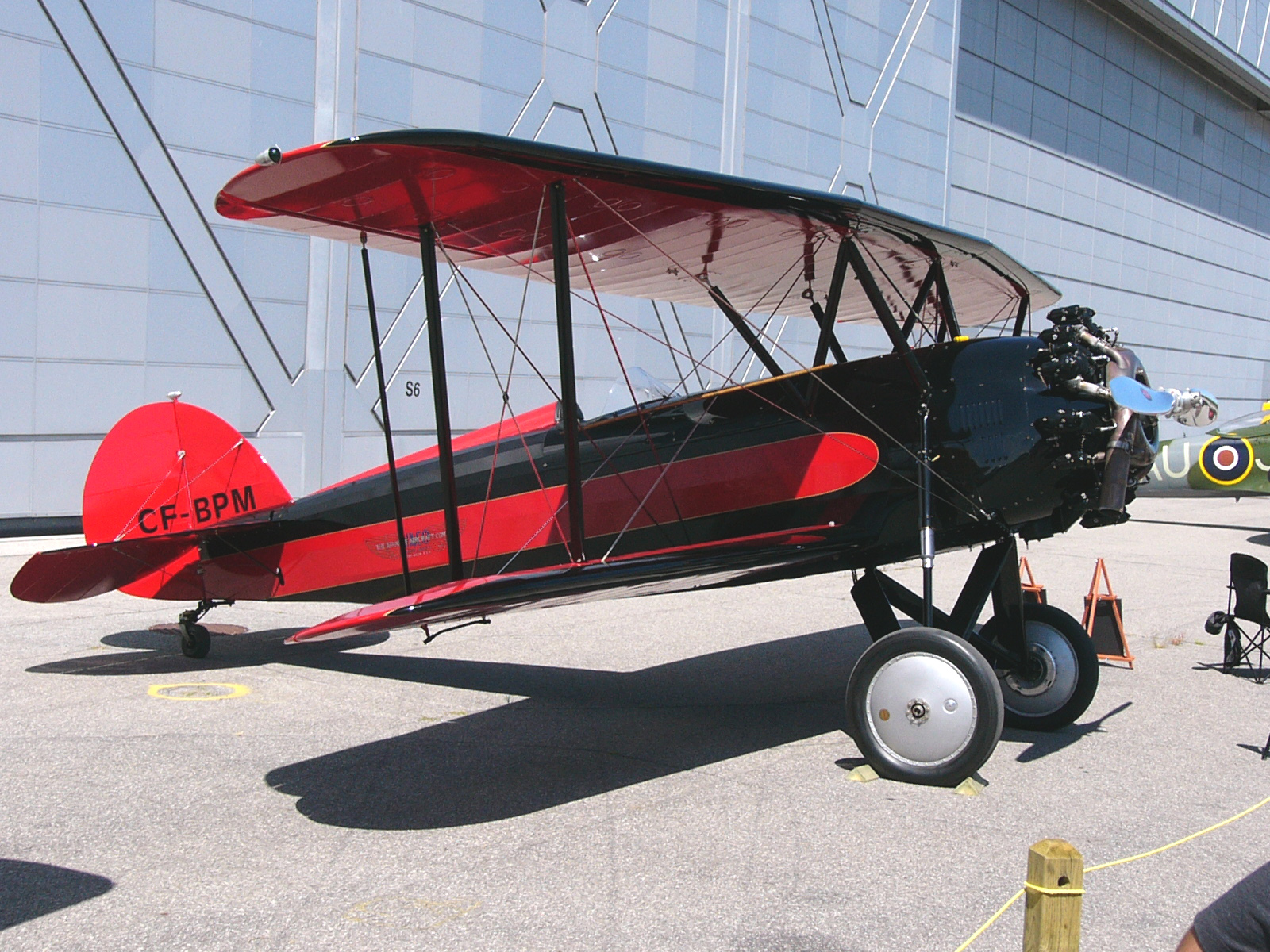
1929 model Advance Aircraft Company/Waco ATO 'Taperwing' of Vintage Wings of Canada.

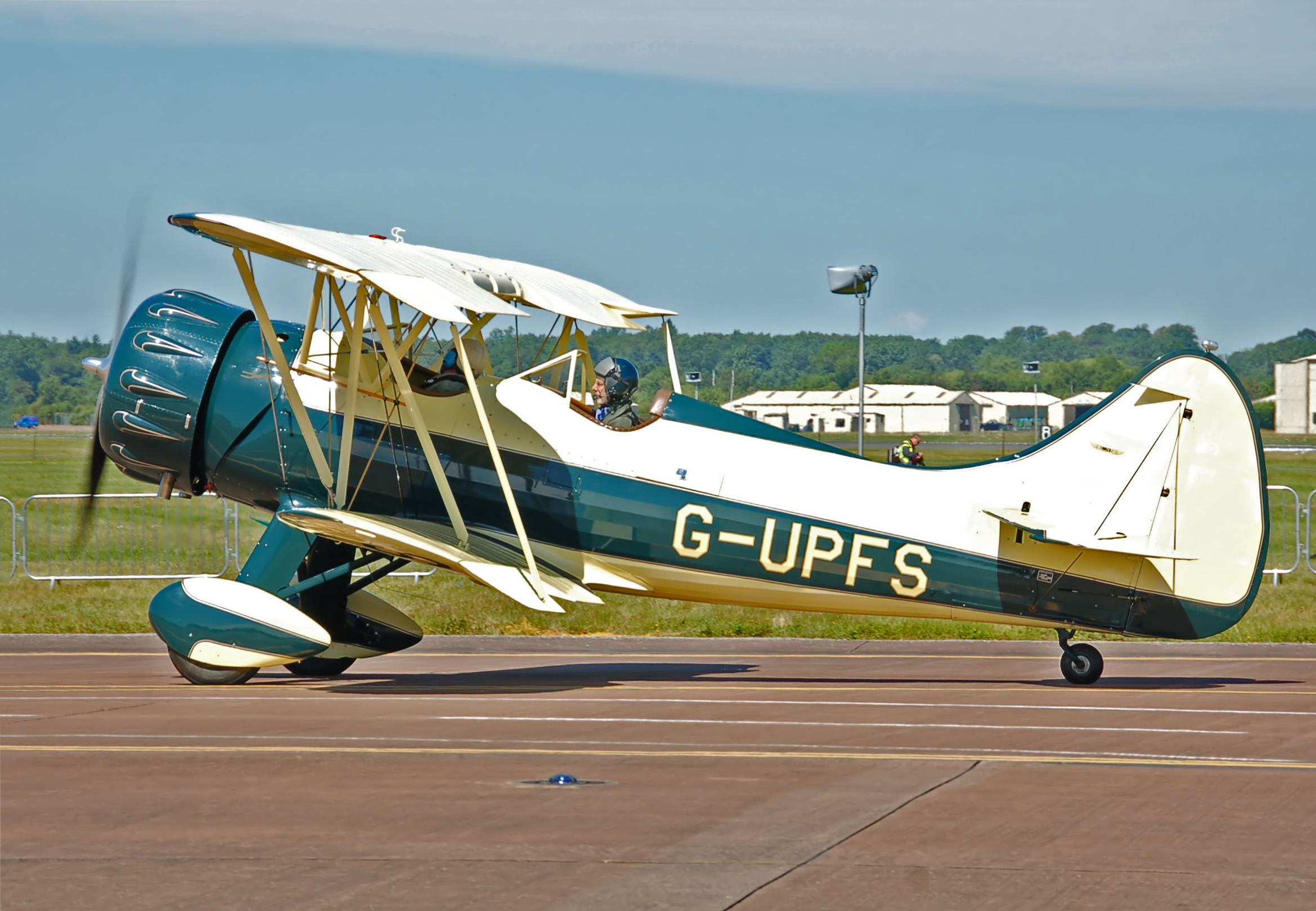
Waco UPF-7, built in 1941, arriving at the 2014 Royal International Air Tattoo, England

The Waco Aircraft Company (WACO) was an aircraft manufacturer located in Troy, Ohio, United States. Between 1920 and 1947, the company produced a wide range of civilian biplanes.

The company initially started under the name Weaver Aircraft Company of Ohio but changed its name to the Waco Aircraft Company in 1928/29.

== Name ==
WACO (referring to the aircraft) is usually pronounced "wah-co" (rhymes with “taco”), not "way-co" like Waco, Texas, whose name is entirely unrelated.

Several companies operated under the Waco name, with the first company being the Weaver Aircraft Company, a firm founded by George E. Weaver, Clayton Bruckner, and Elwood Junkin in 1920 in Lorain and Medina, Ohio after they had already been collaborating for several years. In the spring of 1923 this became the Advance Aircraft Company in Troy, Ohio, after the departure of Weaver.

In 1929, it was changed from Advance Aircraft Company to Waco Aircraft Company. The firm is often confused with Western Aviation Company, the name of four unrelated aircraft enterprises in Chicago, Illinois; San Antonio, Texas; and Burbank, California.

== History ==
=== Origins and early success ===
Waco's history started in 1919 when businessmen Clayton J. "Clayt" Brukner and Elwood "Sam" Junkin met barnstorming pilots Charles "Charley" William Meyers and George "Buck" Weaver. Although their initial floatplane design was a failure, they went on to found the Waco company in 1920 and established themselves as producers of reliable, rugged planes that were popular with travelling businessmen, postal services and explorers, especially after the company began producing closed-cabin biplane models after 1930 in addition to the open cockpit biplanes.

The Waco name was extremely well represented in the U.S. civil aircraft registry between the wars, with more Wacos registered than the aircraft of any other company. Production types include open cockpit biplanes, cabin biplanes and cabin sesquiplanes (known by Waco as Custom Cabins) as well as numerous experimental types.

=== World War II ===
During World War II, Waco produced large numbers of military gliders for the RAF and US Army Air Forces for airborne operations, especially during the Normandy Invasion and Operation Market Garden. The Waco CG-4 was the most numerous of their glider designs to be produced. At the same time Waco produced over 600 of its UPF-7 open biplanes and 21 VKS-7F cabin biplanes for the Civilian Pilot Training Program, which supplemented the output of the military training establishments. 42 privately owned models of sixteen types were impressed into service as light transports and utility aircraft with the USAAF under the common designation C-72/UC-72.

=== End of normal operations ===
Waco ceased operations in 1947, having suffered the fate of a number of general aviation companies when an anticipated boom in aviation following World War II failed to develop. The final Waco relied on an experimental Franklin engine which, with the cancellation of other contracts became so expensive, that the Aristocraft, which relied on it, was cancelled.

=== Revivals ===
==== Modern European WACOs ====
The Waco brand name was briefly revived, in the 1960s and early 1970s—for a scheme to produce, assemble, re-assemble or market a series of modern, all-metal Italian and French lightplanes (semi-monocoque, enclosed-cabin, low-wing, single-engine) under licence in the United States. The program was headed by a "Mr. Berger," and the enterprise was known (in 1968) as Waco Aircraft Co., a subsidiary of Allied Aero Industries, Inc., and based at Pottstown-Limerick Airport, Pottstown, Pennsylvania, with dealers in Connecticut, Georgia, Oklahoma, Texas, California, and Ontario, Canada. The European WACOs—in some cases replacing the original Lycoming engines with less-popular Franklin engines (Mr. Berger was involved with Franklin) -- were to be manufactured (or at least assembled or re-assembled) in the U.S. by WACO Aircraft Company at Syracuse, New York. Only several dozen (perhaps 65–150) of these European-origin aircraft were sold as WACOs before the death of Mr. Berger put an end to the program. These planes included:

- WACO Sirrus – a relabeled Italian SIAI-Marchetti S.205 comparable to the Piper PA-28 Cherokee line, a four-seat touring airplane offered with fixed or retractable gear, and Franklin or Lycoming engines ranging from 180 to 220 horsepower.
- WACO Vela – the Italian SIAI Marchetti S.208, an enhanced, five-seat version of the Sirrus / S.205, with 260 horsepower, retractable landing gear, and flush-riveted, laminar-flow wings—arguably in the same class as the Beech Bonanza line. It came with an autopilot as standard equipment—unusual for aircraft of its class, at that time—and the first fault-annunciator panel in a general aviation airplane.
- WACO Meteor – a relabeled Italian SIAI Marchetti F.250 / SF.260 fast, acrobatic, three-seat sport / trainer / touring plane, later offered, by others, in manufactured metal versions, metal and wood kitplanes, and as a plans-built wooden aircraft (as for instance, the SF.260, and Sequoia]). Marketed in the United States under the name Waco TS-250-3 Meteor, only four were shipped to the U.S.
- WACO Minerva – relabeled French Morane-Saulnier MS.880 Rallye Minerva, a four-seat STOL aircraft designed for use in and out of very small, unimproved landing strips, later produced by French SOCATA as the SOCATA Rallye. (Reportedly, only 3 WACO Minervas were delivered.)

==== Modern production ====
The WACO Classic Aircraft company (unrelated to the original Waco) began building its WACO Classic YMF in 1986, an upgraded version based on Waco's original type certified design.

=== Surviving aircraft ===
A large number of survivors exist, with the largest single collection residing at the Historic Aircraft Restoration Museum at Dauster Field, Creve Coeur, near St Louis, Missouri.

=== Closure ===
On April 29, 2026, Waco suddenly announced that it would shut down all manufacturing and aircraft maintenance services. Employees at the company’s Battle Creek, MI factory were abruptly notified of the closure.

== Models ==
Engine designations (1930–1942)
Letter	Engine
A	Jacobs L-6MB
B	Wright R-540
C	Wright R-760
D	Wright R-760-E1
E	Wright R-760-E2
H	Lycoming R-680-E3
I	Kinner B-5
J	Wright R-975-E1
K	Kinner K-5
M	Menasco C-4
O	Kinner C-5
P	Jacobs LA-1
Q	Continental A-70
R	Warner Scarab
S	Pratt & Whitney R-985
U	Continental R-670, W-670-K, W-670-6
V	Continental W-670-M
W	Wright R-975-E3
Y	Jacobs L-4MB
Z	Jacobs L-5MB

Note: Waco civilian designations describe the configuration of the aircraft. The first letter lists the engine used, the second the specific type, and the third the general series. The coding system was changed in 1929 with several letters reassigned, and later with the introduction of the Custom Cabin series, the third letter 'C' was initially replaced with C-S (Cabin-Standard) and finally S. The numeral suffix represents the first year of production if it is 6 or higher (6=1936), or a sub type if 2 or less. Thus EGC-7 is a Wright R-760-E2 (350 hp (261 kW)) engined, cabin biplane airframe, custom cabin model first manufactured in 1937.

Many Waco Cabin Biplanes that were originally sold as civilian aircraft, were impressed into military service in World War II. The United States Army Air Forces classified theirs regardless of type as Waco C-72s, with type letters identifying specific models. Other countries used other designations for their own Wacos.

=== Open cockpit biplanes and monoplanes ===
Waco Cootie
Single seat biplane/parasol monoplane, 1 produced, then re-built
Waco models 4 through 7
Used many Curtiss JN-4 parts with new interchangeable wing panels and powered by a 90 hp (67 kW) Curtiss OX-5.
Waco 8
First Waco cabin biplane, powered by 200 hp (149 kW) Liberty - 1 built
Waco 9
First mass-production model, steel-tube framing, powered by OX-5, equipped for EDO floats. Many re-engined. 270 built.

- Miss Pittsburgh

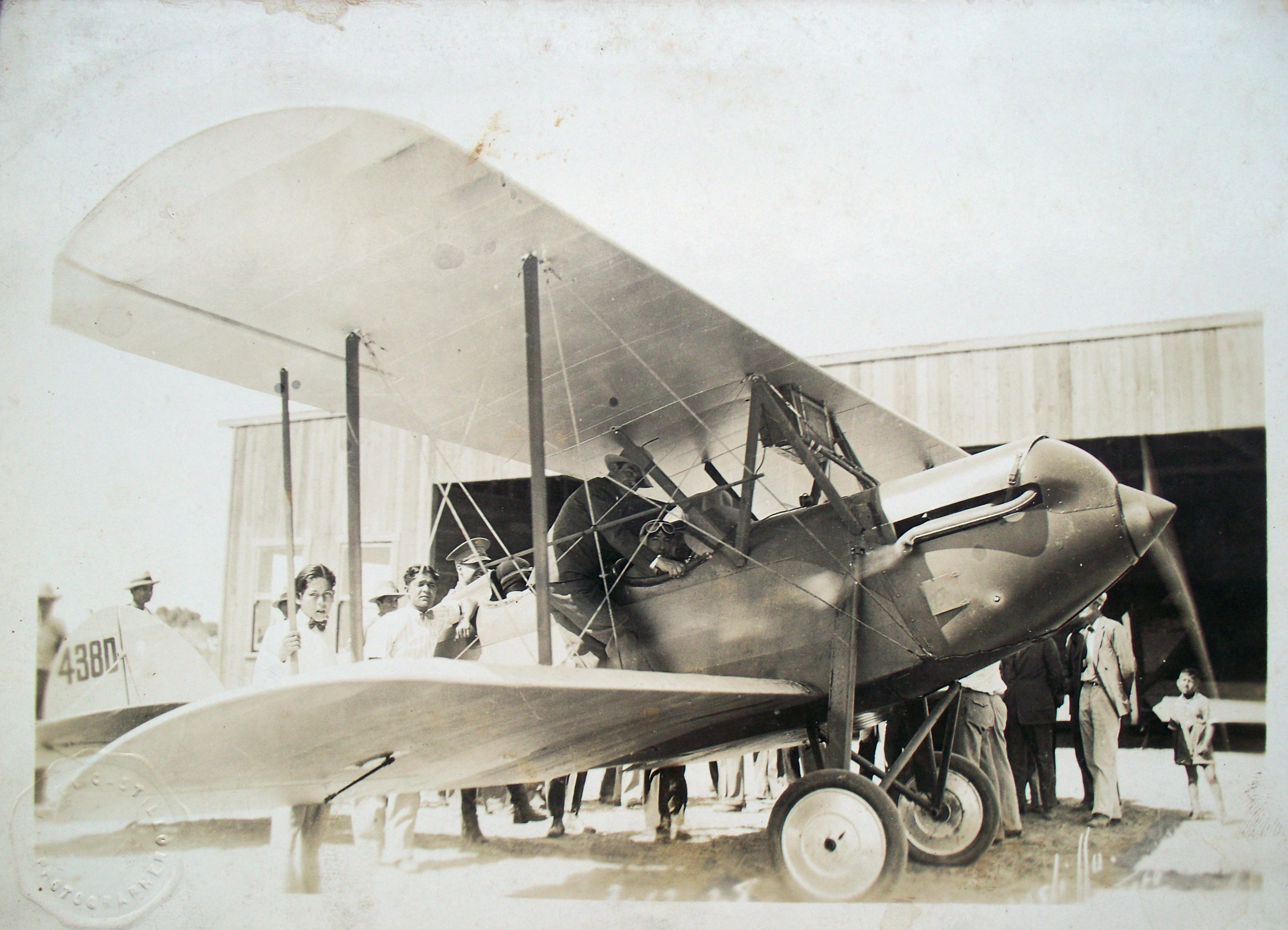
Waco 10 giving joy rides, c.1930

Waco 10
Most produced model of any Waco aircraft, 1,623 built between 1927 and 1933. Refinement of Waco 9 with 90 hp (67 kW) Curtiss OX-5 V8 engine. Redesignated GXE by Waco in 1928. When letter designations were used, a final letter M indicated it was a mailplane, and the middle letter of S indicated a straight "Hershey bar" wing, while a T indicated the model was a taperwing, with the chord at the wingtips being less than half of the root chord.

- Waco 240: 1 conversion of Waco 10 with 240 hp (180 kW) Continental W-670 radial engine.
- Waco ASO: Waco 10 variant with 220 hp (160 kW) Wright J-5 radial engine, known as J-5 Straightwing, Waco Sport, and Whirlwind Waco. 95 built.
- Waco BSO: Variant of ASO 165 hp (123 kW) Wright J-6-5 radial engine. 45 built.
- Waco CSO: Variant of ASO with 225 hp (168 kW) Wright J-6-7 radial engine. 59 built.
- Waco DSO: Variant of ASO with 180 hp (130 kW) Hispano-Suiza A/E V8 engine. 62 built.
- Waco HSO: Variant of ASO with 225 hp (168 kW) Packard DR-980 engine. 1 built.
- Waco ATO: Taperwing variant of ASO. 54 built.
- Waco CTO: Taperwing variant of CSO. 35 built.
- Waco HTO: Modified from HSO. 1 built.
- Waco JTO: 300 hp (220 kW) Wright J-6-9. 1 built.
- Waco JYO: JTO variant for evaluation by U.S. Navy. 2 built.

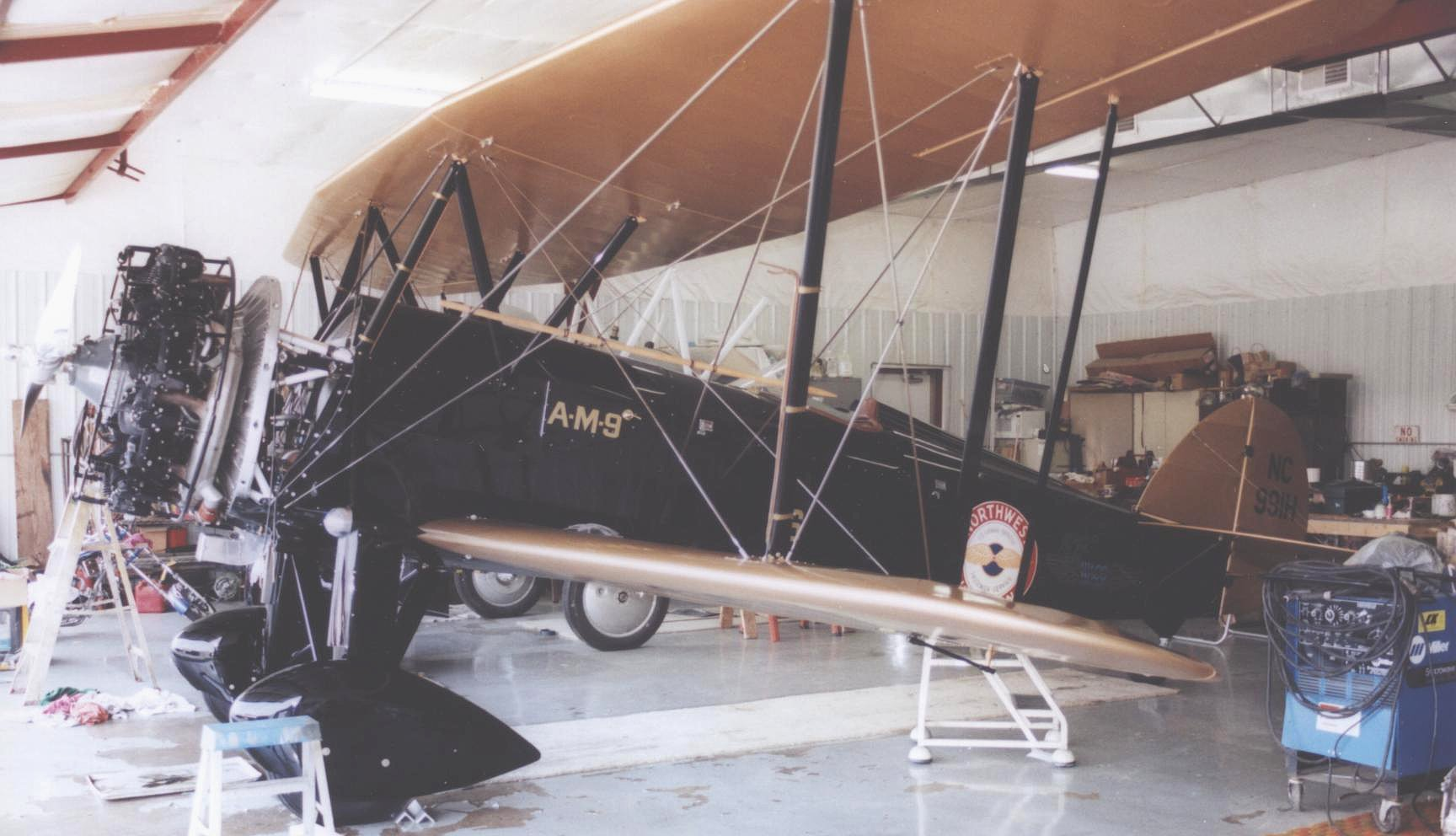
Preserved 1929-built JYM mailplane of Northwest Airways

Waco Mailplanes

- Waco JWM: Straightwing mailplane with 330 hp (250 kW) Wright R-975 engine. Derivative of ASO with 14" fuselage stretch. 2 built.
- Waco JYM: Taperwing mailplane with 300 hp (220 kW) Wright J-6-9 radial engine. Derivative of ATO with 14" fuselage stretch. 4 built for Northwest Airways

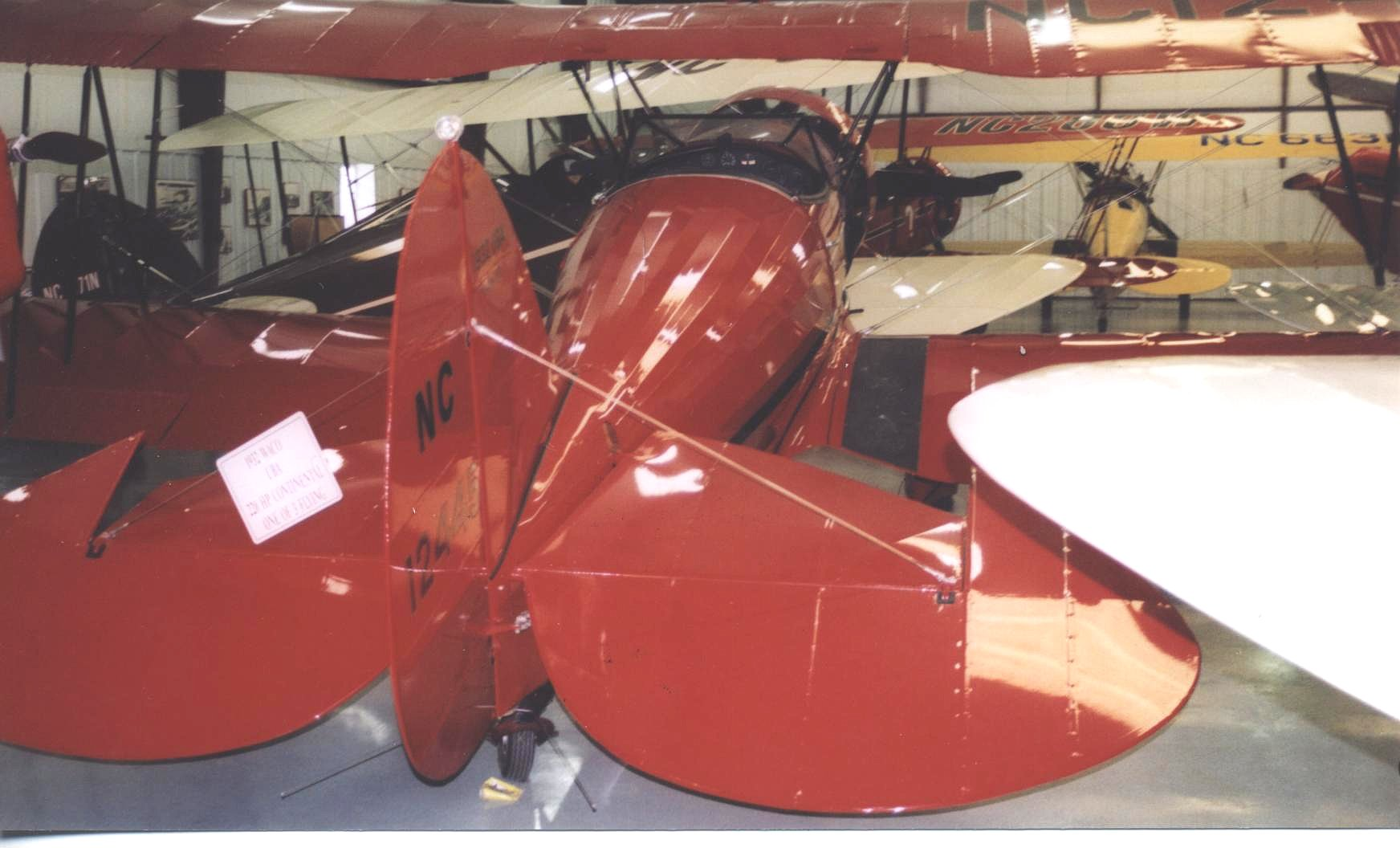
Waco PBA side-by-side biplane of 1932

Waco A series

- Waco IBA: Improved KBA, side by side two seat biplane with optional canopy and 125 hp (93 kW) Kinner B-5 engine. 3 built.
- Waco KBA: 100 hp (75 kW) Kinner K-5 radial engine. 50 built.
- Waco PBA: IBA variant with 170 hp (130 kW) Jacobs LA-1 radial engine. 4 built.
- Waco RBA: IBA variant with 110 hp (82 kW) Warner Scarab radial engine. 4 built.
- Waco UBA: IBA variant with 210 hp (160 kW) Continental R-670 radial engine. 6 built.
- Waco PLA: Improved IBA, known as Waco Sportsman, with Jacobs LA-1 radial engine and greater range. 4 built.
- Waco ULA: PLA variant with 210 hp (160 kW) Continental R-670 radial engine. 1 built.

=== Waco D series ===
Waco CHD
Multipurpose military biplane with 250 hp (190 kW) Wright J-6-7 Whirlwind radial engine.
Waco JHD
Multipurpose military biplane with 365 hp (272 kW) Wright J-6-9 Whirlwind radial engine. 6 exported to Uruguay.
Waco S2HD
Multipurpose military export biplane with 450 hp (340 kW) Pratt & Whitney Wasp Junior SB radial engine. 1 exported to Cuba
Waco S3HD
Multipurpose military biplane with 400 hp (300 kW) Pratt & Whitney Wasp Junior TB. 1 built.
Waco S3HD-A
Armed variant of S3HD but otherwise similar, 4 exported to Cuba.
Waco WHD
Multipurpose military biplane with 420 hp (310 kW) Wright J-6-9 Whirlwind engine. 5 built, including 4 exported to Nicaragua.
Waco CMD
Multipurpose military biplane with 250 hp (190 kW) Wright J-6-7 Whirlwind. None built.

=== Waco F series ===
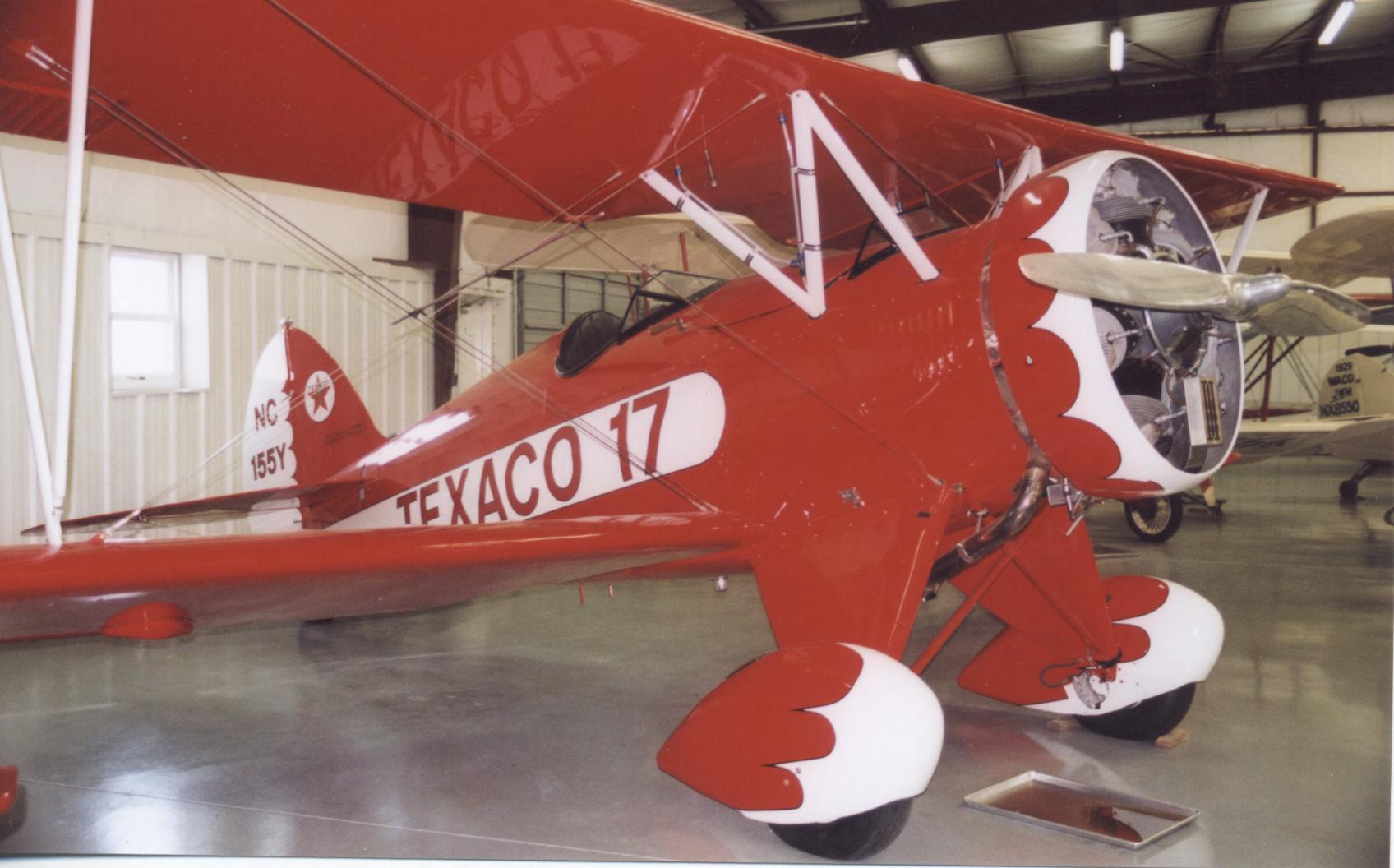
Waco UBF of 1932 flown by Texaco in the early 1930s

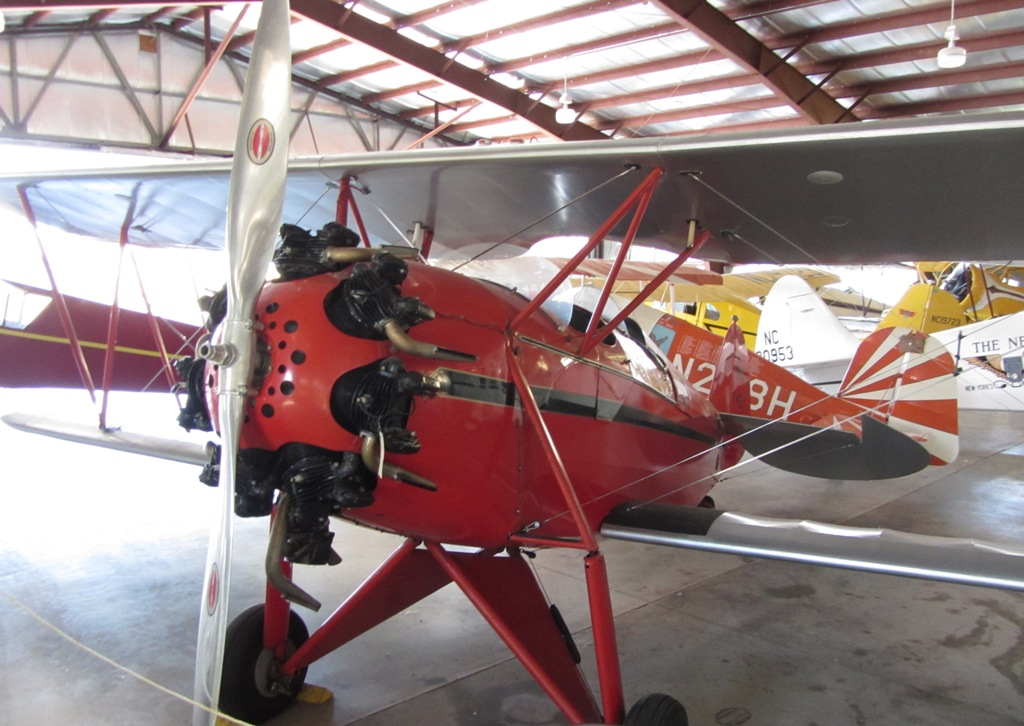
Waco RNF

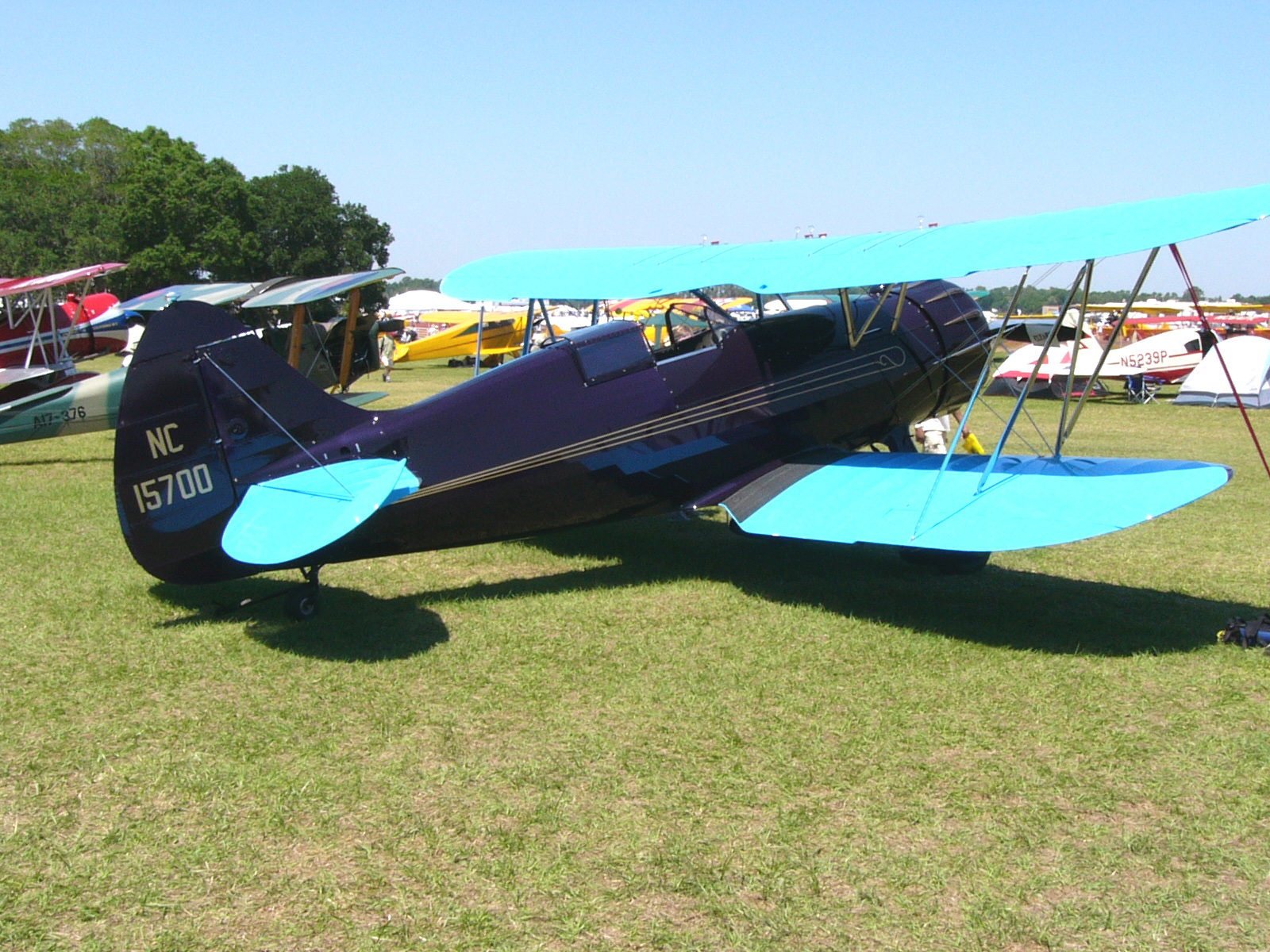
Waco YPF at Sun 'n Fun

- Waco OBF: 210 hp (160 kW) Kinner C-5 engine. Unknown if built.
- Waco PBF: 170 hp (130 kW) Jacobs LA-1 engine. 4 built.
- Waco TBF: 160 hp (120 kW) Kinner R-5(?) engine. None built.
- Waco UBF & Waco UBF-2: 210 hp (160 kW)p Continental R-670 engine. Around 11 built. (two built for US Navy late in the USS Macon airship program as XJW-1 trainers with skyhooks for launch and recovery from the airship).
- Waco PCF: 170 hp (130 kW) Jacobs LA-1 radial engine. 3 built.
- Waco QCF: 165 hp (123 kW) Continental A-70 radial engine. 31 built.
- Waco UCF: 210 hp (160 kW) Continental R-670 radial engine. None built, became UBF.
- Waco UMF-3 & Waco UMF-5: 210 hp (160 kW) Continental R-670 radial engine. 18 built.
- Waco YMF-3: 225 hp (168 kW) Jacobs L-4 radial engine. 18 built -3 & -5.
- Waco YMF-5: 245 hp (183 kW) Jacobs L-4 radial engine. Basis for YMF-5 Super currently in production.
- Waco INF: 125 hp (93 kW) Kinner B-5 radial engine. 50 built.
- Waco KNF: 100 hp (75 kW) Kinner K-5 radial engine. 20 built.
- Waco MNF: 125 hp (93 kW) Menasco C-4 Pirate inline engine. 4 built.
- Waco QNF: 165 hp (123 kW) Continental A-70 radial engine. 1 built.
- Waco RNF: 110 hp (82 kW) Warner Scarab radial engine. 177 built.
- Waco CPF & Waco CPF-6: 250 hp (190 kW) Wright R-760 radial engine. 41 built, redesignated DPF.
- Waco DPF-6 & Waco DPF-7: 285 hp (213 kW) Wright R-760 radial engine. Was CPF.
- Waco EPF-6: 320 hp (240 kW) Wright R-760 radial engine. 1 built.
- Waco LPF-6: 300 hp (220 kW) Lycoming R-680 radial engine. Possibly not built.
- Waco UPF-6: 210 hp (160 kW) Continental R-670 radial engine. Prototype for UPF-7.
- Waco UPF-7: Second-most produced variant, over 600 built. Continental W-670 220 hp (160 kW) engine. Widely used in the Civilian Pilot Training Program. 14 became YPT-14 trainers, but not adopted by USAAF.
- Waco VPF-6 & Waco VPF-7: 240 hp (180 kW) Continental W-670 radial engine. 6 built.
- Waco YPF-6 & Waco YPF-7: 225 hp (168 kW) Jacobs L-4 radial engine. 8 built.
- Waco ZPF-6 & Waco ZPF-7: 285 hp (213 kW) Jacobs L-5 radial engine. 5 built.

=== Waco CRG ===
- 240 hp (180 kW) Wright R-760 radial engine, later a different Wright R-760.

Waco RPT-1
Low wing open cockpit monoplane trainer prototype, similar in concept to Fairchild PT-19. 1 built.

=== Waco Standard Cabin Biplanes ===
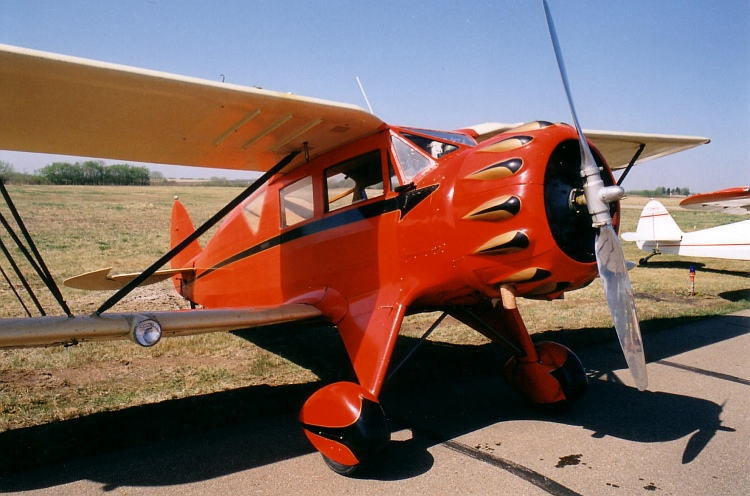
Waco UIC standard cabin biplane

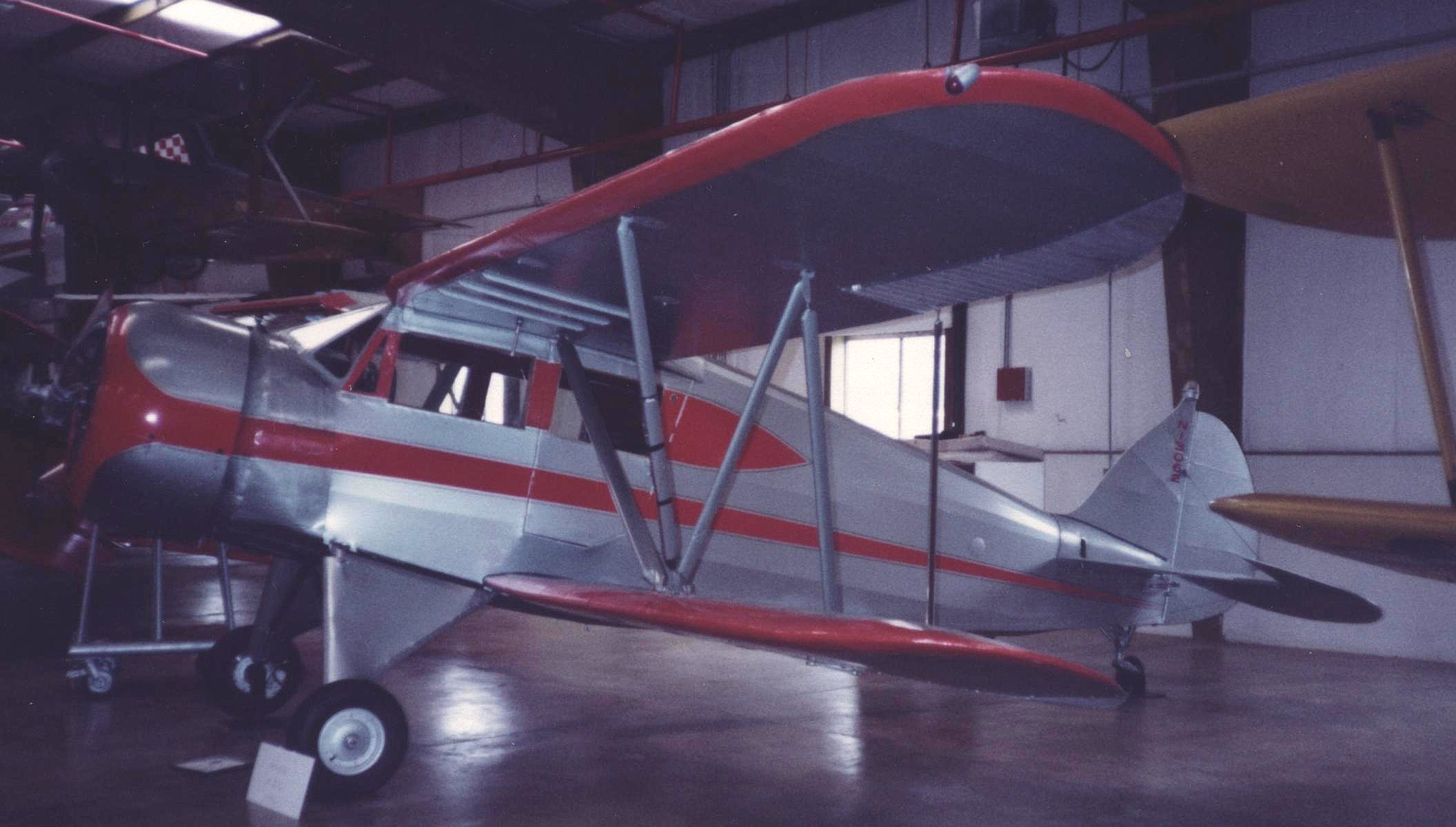
Waco UIC

- Waco BDC: with 165 hp (123 kW) Wright R-540 engine. None built.
- Waco ODC: with 210 hp (160 kW) Kinner C-5 engine. modified to QDC.
- Waco PDC: with 170 hp (130 kW) Jacobs LA-1 engine. 2 built on special order.
- Waco QDC: with 165 hp (123 kW) Continental A-70 engine. 37 built.
- Waco UDC: with 210 hp (160 kW) Continental R-670 engine. None built.
- Waco OEC: with 210 hp (160 kW) Kinner C-5 engine. 3 built.
- Waco UEC: with 210 hp (160 kW) Continental R-670 engine. 40 built.
- Waco BEC: with 165 hp (123 kW) Wright R-540 engine. 1 built (converted from OEC or UEC).
- Waco UIC: with 210 hp (160 kW) Continental R-670 engine. 83 built.
- Waco CJC & Waco CJC-S: with 250 hp (190 kW) Wright R-760 engine. 41 CJC & DJC built.
- Waco DJC, Waco DJC-S & Waco DJS: with 285 hp (213 kW) Wright R-760 engine.
- Waco UKC, Waco UKC-S & Waco UKS-6: with 210 hp (160 kW) Continental R-670. 40 built.
- Waco VKS-7: with 225 hp (168 kW) Continental R-670-B engine. 18 built.
- Waco VKS-7F: VKS-7 for CPTP with flaps. 21 built.
- Waco YKC, Waco YKC-S & Waco YKS-6: with 225 hp (168 kW) Jacobs L-4

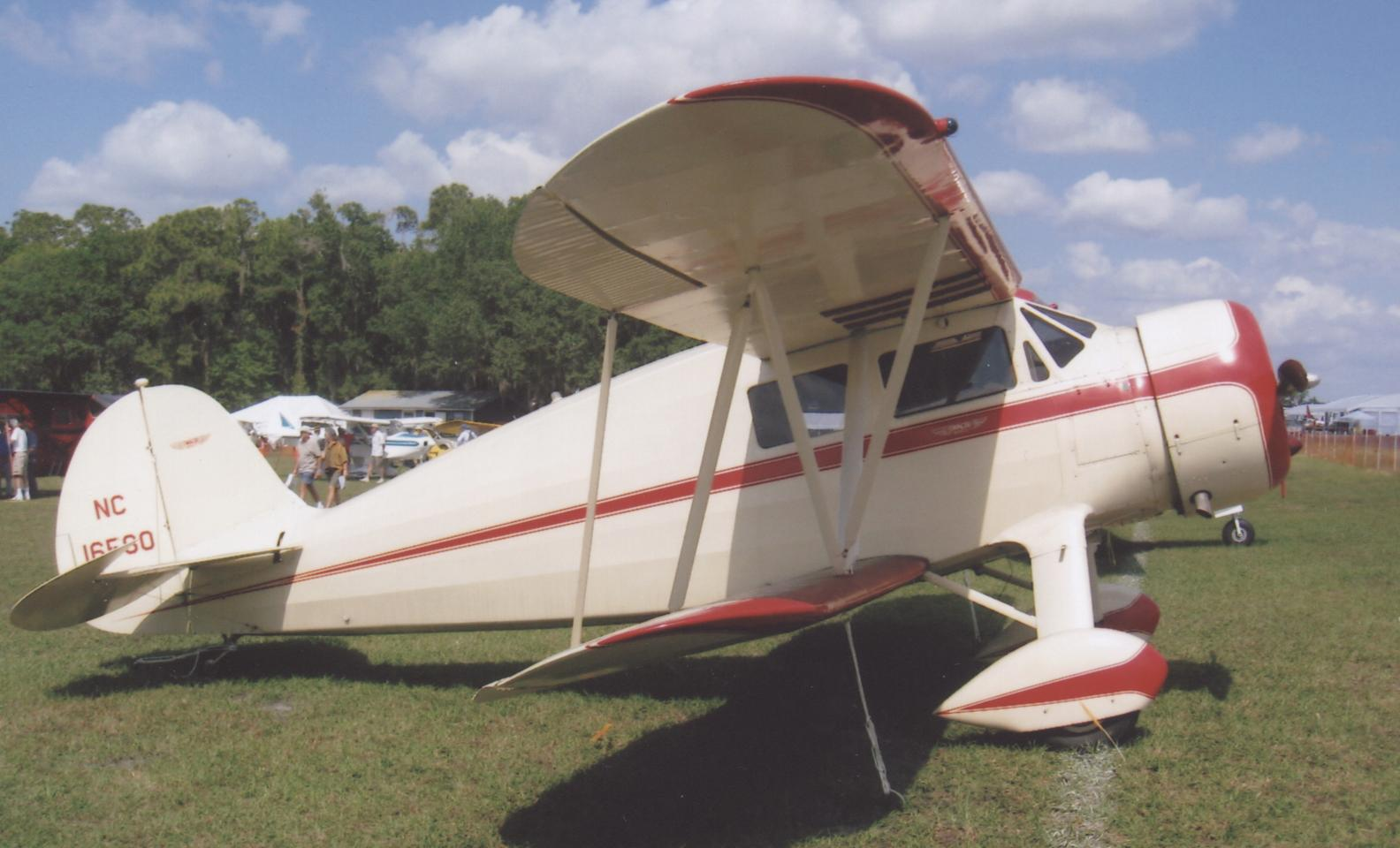
Waco YKS-6 cabin tourer of 1936

- Waco ZKC, Waco ZKC-S & Waco ZKS: with 285 hp (213 kW) Jacobs L-5 engine. 60 YKC built, 22 YKC-S built, 65 YKS-6 built; Several ZKS-7 built, one converted to HKS-7 (300 hp (220 kW) Lycoming R-680-13 in 1947).

=== Waco Custom Cabin Biplanes (sesquiplanes) ===
- Waco UOC: 210 hp (160 kW) Continental R-670-A or 225 hp (168 kW) Continental R-670-B engine. 4 built.
- YOC: 225 hp (168 kW) Jacobs L-4 engine. 50+ YOC & YOC-1 built.
- YOC-1: 285 hp (213 kW) Jacobs L-5 engine.

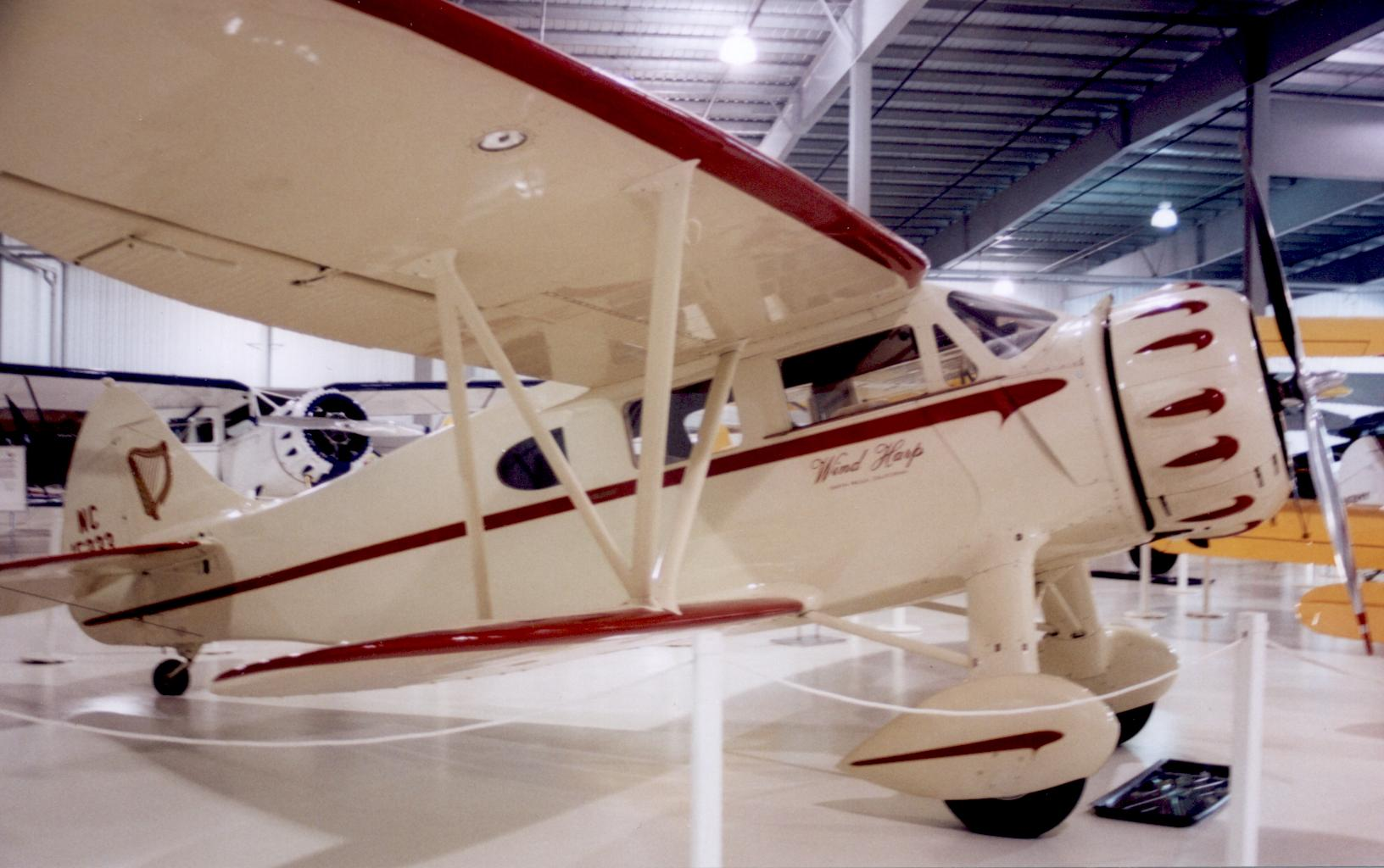
Waco CUC of 1935 showing the extended cabin and windows of the later C series models. Anoka-Blaine airport near Minneapolis, June 2006.

- Waco CUC: 250 hp (190 kW) Wright R-760-E engine. 30+ built of all CUC types.
- Waco CUC-1: 285 hp (213 kW) Wright R-760-E1 engine.
- Waco CUC-2: 320 hp (240 kW) Wright R-760 engine.
- Waco AQC-6: 300 hp (220 kW) Jacobs L-5 engine. 7 built.
- Waco CQC-6: 250 hp (190 kW) Wright R-760 engine. None built.
- Waco DQC-6: 285 hp (213 kW) Wright R-760 engine. 11 built.

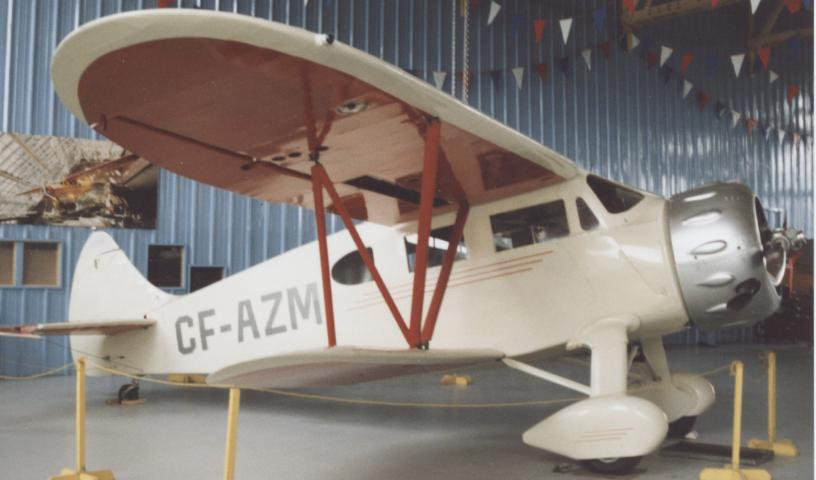
Waco EQC-6 Custom at the Calgary Aerospace Museum in 1996 showing the longer cabin glazing of late C series aircraft

- Waco EQC-6: 320 hp (240 kW) Wright R-760 engine. 20 built. USCG used 3 as J2W-1.
- Waco SQC-6: 300 hp (220 kW) Pratt & Whitney Wasp Jr engine. None built.
- Waco UQC-6: 210 hp (160 kW) Continental R-670 or 225 hp (168 kW) W-670-K or 220 hp (160 kW) W-670-6. Probably none built.
- Waco VQC-6: 250 hp (190 kW) Continental W-670 engine.
- Waco YQC-6: 225 hp (168 kW) Jacobs L-4 engine. 13 built. 1 ex-RAAF example re-engined with 200 hp (150 kW) DeHavilland Gypsy 6 inline engine.
- Waco ZQC-6: 285 hp (213 kW) Jacobs L-5 engine. 68 built.
- Waco AGC-8: 300 hp (220 kW) Jacobs L-6 engine. 17 built, 2 modified to EGC-8.
- Waco DGC-7: 285 hp (213 kW) Wright R-760 engine. 2 built.
- Waco EGC-7, Waco EGC-8: 320 hp (240 kW) Wright R-760 engine. 38 built. 3 used by US Navy & Coast Guard as J2W.
- Waco MGC-8: Menasco Pirate inline engine. Unknown number built.
- Waco UGC-7: 210 hp (160 kW) Continental R-670 engine. None built.
- Waco VGC-7: 240 hp (180 kW) Continental W-670 engine. None built.
- Waco YGC-7, Waco YGC-8: 225 hp (168 kW) Jacobs L-4 engine. Possibly none built.
- Waco ZGC-7, Waco ZGC-8: 285 hp (213 kW) Jacobs L-5 engine. 28 built.

=== Waco S series (1935–1940) ===
- Standard cabin designs in production were redesignated with an S type letter to distinguish them from the new Custom Cabin series.

=== Waco N series (1937–1938) ===
- Waco AVN-8: Nosewheel Type with 300 hp (220 kW) Jacobs L-6 engine. 15 built.
- Waco ZVN-7 & Waco ZVN-8: Nosewheel Type with 285 hp (213 kW) Jacobs L-5 engine. 6 built.

=== Waco E series (1939–1940) ===
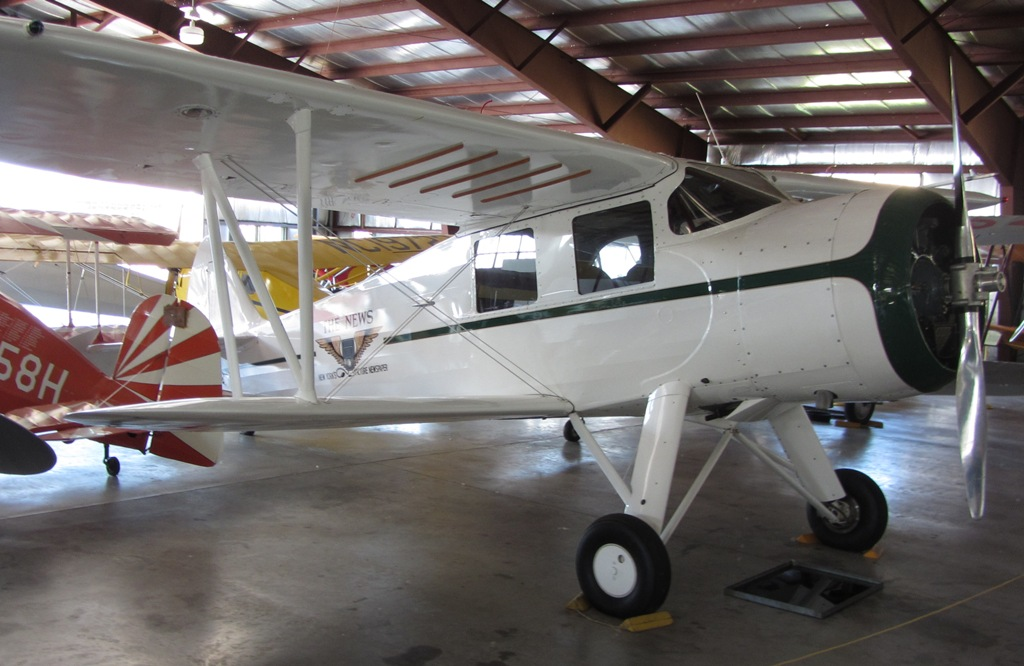
Waco ARE on display

- Waco ARE Aristocrat: 300 hp (220 kW) Jacobs L-6 engine. 4 built.
- Waco HRE Aristocrat: 285 hp (213 kW) Lycoming R-680 engine. 5 built.
- Waco SRE Aristocrat: 450 hp (340 kW) Pratt & Whitney R-985 engine. 21 built.
- Waco WRE Aristocrat: 420 hp (310 kW) Wright R-975 engine. None built.

=== Gliders ===
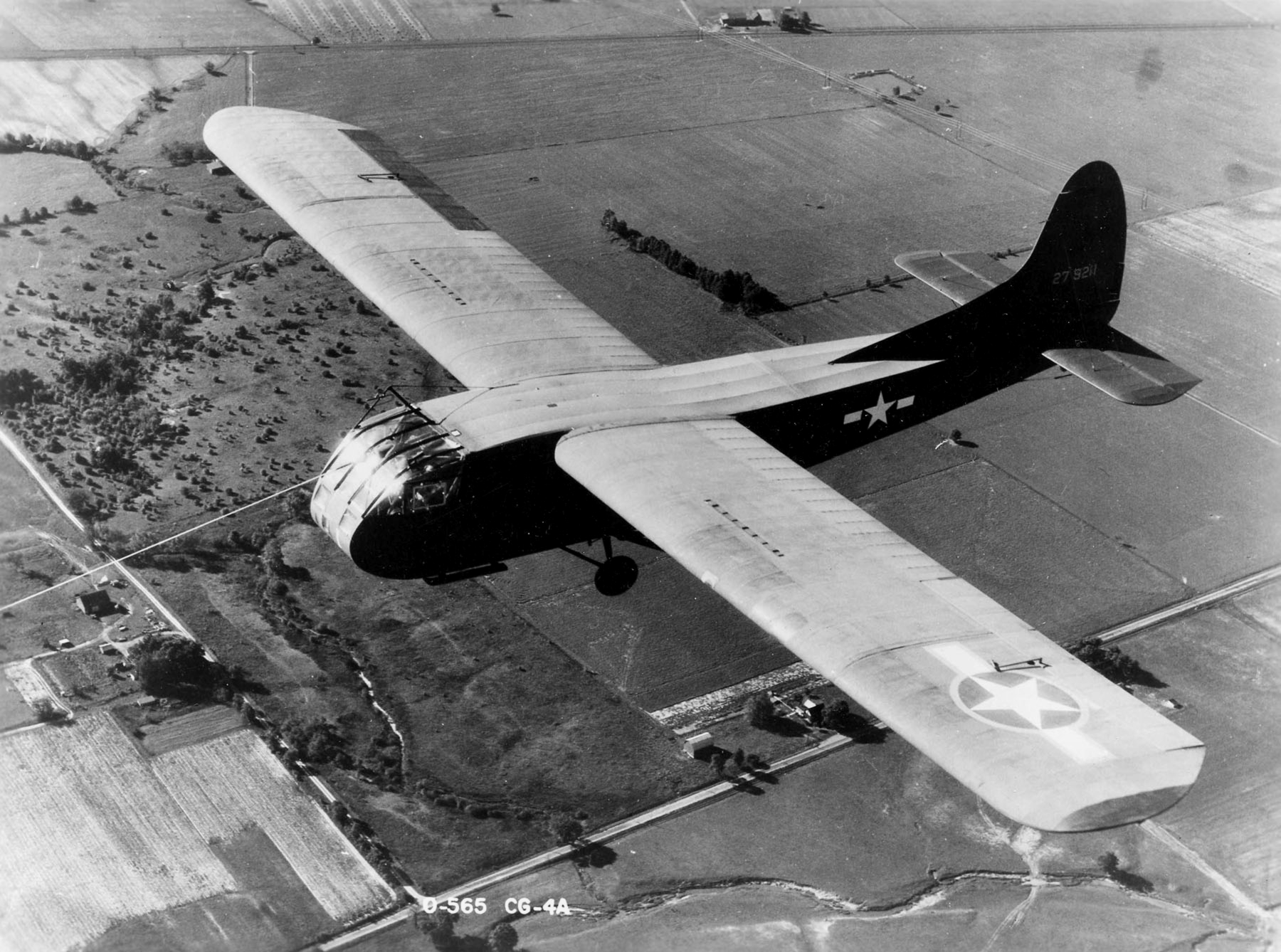
Waco CG-4A troop glider

- WACO Primary Glider: single place trainer.
- Waco CG-3: troop glider intended for training CG-4 pilots.
- Waco CG-4, also known as the "Hadrian", troop glider.
- Waco CG-13: troop glider.
- Waco CG-15: troop glider.

=== Other transports ===
- Northwestern XPG-1: Powered version of CG-4 Glider with 2 x Franklin 6AC-298-N3.
- Ridgefield XPG-2: Powered version of CG-4 Glider with 2 x Ranger L-440-1.
- Waco YC-62: All-wood twin-engine Transport (not built).
- Waco C-72.
- Waco Aristocraft: Monoplane pusher cabin transport with engine in nose. Last Waco design to be built. 1 Prototype only.
