= Waco A series =

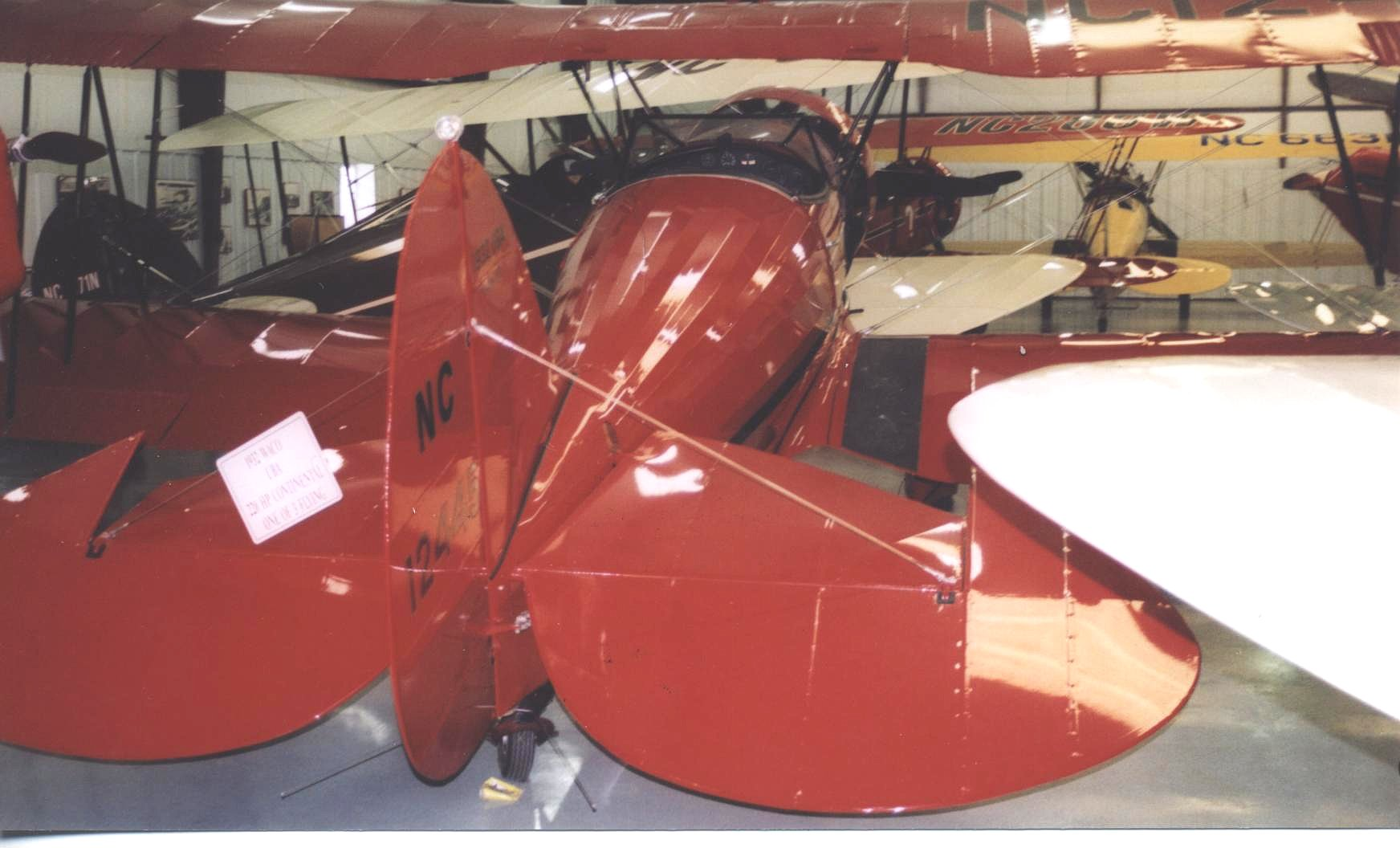
- Waco PBA biplane of 1932 at the Historic Aircraft Restoration Museum near St Louis Missouri in 2006 showing the wide side-by-side seating layout

General information
- Type: two-seat side-by-side biplane
- National origin: United States
- Manufacturer: Waco Aircraft Company
- Status: a few examples still extant in 2009
- Primary user: private owners

History
- Introduction date: 1932

The Waco A series is a range of light American-built twin side-by-side seater sporting biplanes of the early 1930s.

== Development ==
The Waco A series was introduced in 1932 as an affordable private-owner aircraft with cross-country range and baggage capacity and a more sporting image than the larger Waco F series. The A series offered a number of engine options which had varying sub-designations. The power range lay between the KBA with a 100 hp (75 kW) Kinner engine and the later UBA with a 210 hp (157 kW) Continental powerplant.

The PLA "Sportsman" of 1933 introduced a longer wider fuselage and a higher useful load and had a 170 hp (127 kW) Jacobs LA-1 radial engine. The last model in the series was the ULA, also of 1933, with a 210 hp (157 kW) powerplant.

== Operational history ==
The A series was bought mainly by private pilot owners with a sporting inclination. Relatively few were produced and the type survives in small numbers in 2009. A PBA is on display in the Historic Aircraft Restoration Museum at Dauster Field near St Louis, Missouri.

== Variants ==
Data from Aerofiles

=== BA series ===
BBA
165 hp (123 kW) Wright J-5 - none produced
KBA
100 hp (75 kW) Kinner K-5 - one built
IBA
125 hp (93 kW) Kinner B-5 - three built including one conversion
PBA
170 hp (130 kW) Jacobs LA-1 - six built
RBA
110 hp (82 kW) later 125 hp (93 kW) Warner Scarab - 4 built
TBA
160 hp (120 kW) Kinner R-5 - none built
UBA
210 hp (160 kW) Continental R-670 - at least 6 built

=== CA series ===
KCA
100 hp (75 kW) Kinner K-5 - possibly none built
PCA
170 hp (130 kW) Jacobs LA-1 - possibly none built
RCA
110 hp (82 kW) Warner Scarab - possibly none built
TCA
160 hp (120 kW) Kinner R-5 - none built
UCA
210 hp (160 kW) Continental R-670 - none built

=== LA series ===
PLA Sportsman
longer and wider fuselage and 170 hp (130 kW) Jacobs LA-1 - 4 built
ULA Sportsman
as PLA with 210 hp (160 kW) Continental R-670 - 1 built

== Specifications (RBA variant) ==
Data from Green, 1965, p. 306

General characteristics

- Crew: one
- Capacity: one passenger
- Length: 21 ft 0 in (6.4 m)
- Wingspan: 29 ft 6 in (8.84 m)
- Height: 8 ft 8 in (2.44 m)
- Empty weight: 1,250 lb (567 kg)
- Gross weight: 1,949 lb (884 kg)
- Powerplant: 1 × Warner Scarab , 125 hp (93 kW)

Performance

- Maximum speed: 104 mph (167 km/h, 90 kn)
- Cruise speed: 91 mph (146 km/h, 79 kn)
- Range: 400 mi (640 km, 350 nmi)
- Service ceiling: 12,800 ft (3,900 m)
- Rate of climb: 500 ft/min (2.5 m/s)
