= Waco C-62 =

Proposed high-wing transport airplane

YC-62
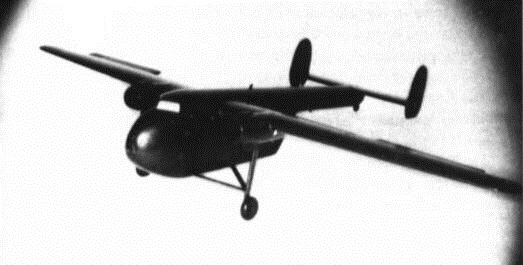
- Wind tunnel model of the YC-62

General information
- Type: Transport aircraft
- National origin: United States
- Manufacturer: Waco Aircraft Company
- Primary user: United States Army Air Forces
- Number built: 0

The Waco C-62 was a proposed high wing transport airplane similar in size and capacity to the Douglas DC-3. 13 pre-production aircraft were ordered in October 1941, with a contract for 240 production models awarded in early 1942; however, the project was canceled in September 1943 in favor of the Curtiss-Wright C-76 Caravan before any aircraft were built.

== Specifications ==
Data from

General characteristics

- Crew: Two
- Capacity: 22 soldiers or 4,400 pounds (2,000 kg) cargo
- Length: 73 ft 10 in (22.5 m)
- Wingspan: 100 ft 0 in (30.48 m)
- Height: 19 ft 1 in (5.82 m)
- Empty weight: 21,660 lb (9,825 kg)
- Max takeoff weight: 29,500 lb (13,381 kg)
- Powerplant: 2 × Pratt & Whitney R-1830-39 radial engines, 1,200 hp (890 kW) each

Performance

- Maximum speed: 150 mph (241 km/h, 130 kn)
- Range: 600 mi (966 km, 522 nmi)
- Service ceiling: 17,001 ft (5,182 m)
