= Waco S series =

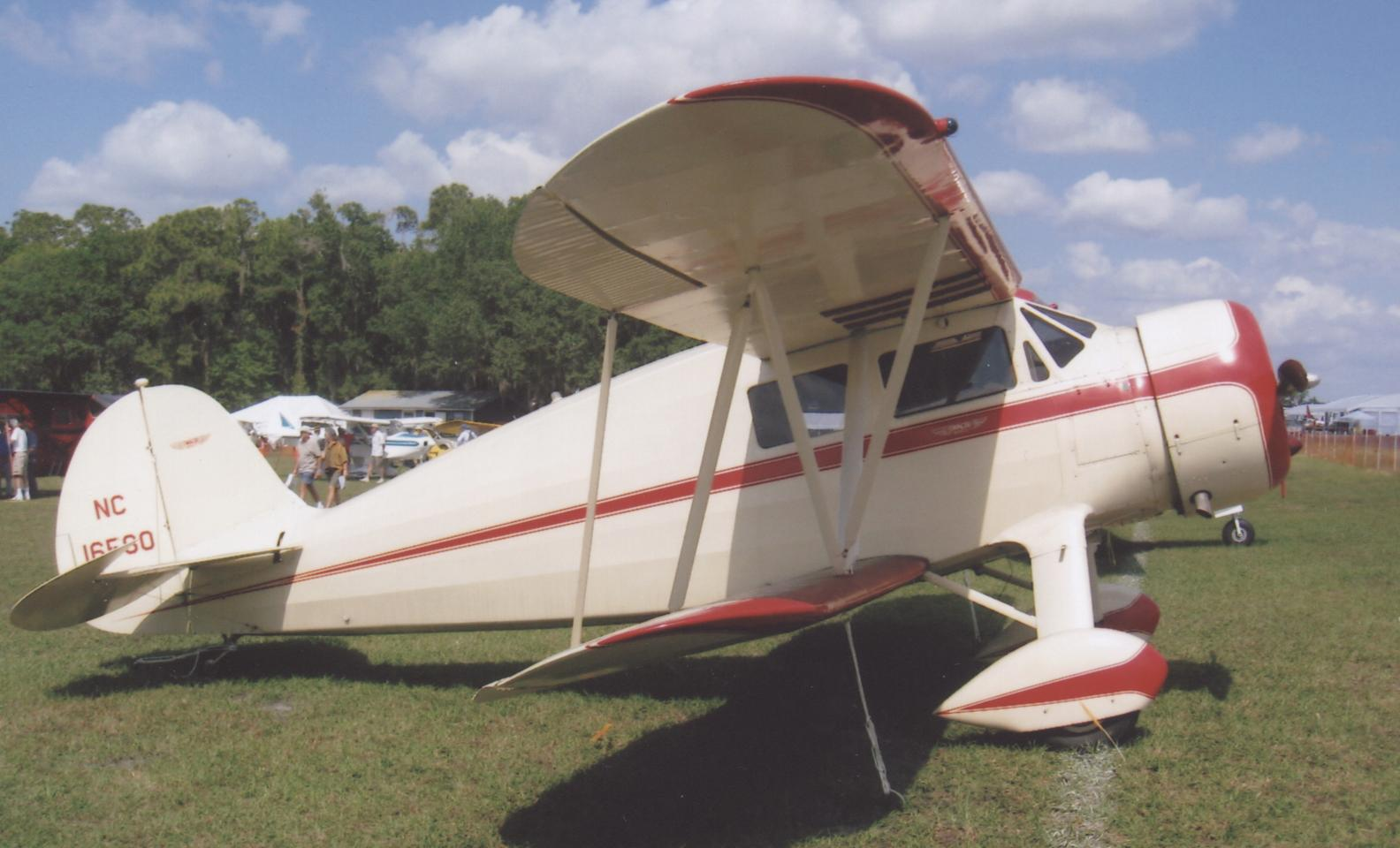
- Waco YKS-6 of 1936 at Sun n'Fun, Lakeland, Florida, in April 2009

General information
- Type: single-engine light cabin biplane
- National origin: United States
- Manufacturer: Waco Aircraft Company
- Status: several airworthy in 2009
- Primary user: small commercial operators and private owner pilots

History
- First flight: 1935
- Developed from: Waco Standard Cabin series

The Waco S Series is a family of American cabin biplanes produced by the Waco Aircraft Company starting in 1935.

== Development and designations ==
The Waco closed cabin biplanes, initially known as the C (for Cabin) series were all unequal span, staggered single bay biplanes. They were fabric covered, the wings having a wooden structure and the control surfaces and fuselage constructed from metal frames. The wings were braced with outward splayed N form interplane struts plus a strut connecting the centre section rear spar to the bottom of the forward interplane strut, following Waco's standard practice. They had a fixed tailwheel undercarriage, which could be partially or completely faired. There was seating for 4/5 including the pilot. Most were powered by 7 cylinder radial engines of different makes.

When Waco released its slightly larger custom cabin series, those original Cabin series aircraft it continued to produce were redesignated as 'Waco Standard Cabin series', with the final designation letter changing from C to C-S to S. For instance in 1935 the YKC became the YKC-S, then the YKS-6 in 1936. All three were indistinguishable from each other. Waco used numeric suffixes like -7 to indicate a subvariant introduced in 1937 and so on. The standard cabin can be subdivided again into three groups, early examples having a boat-tail skylight (QDC, OEC & UEC), mid series aircraft with a faired skylight (CJC, UIC, UKC, YKC) or late examples with no skylight (DJC-S, HKS, ZKS, UKC-S UKS-7, VKS-7, YKC-S, YKS-6 & 7, ZKS-6 & 7). All of the types built under the C-S and S designators lacked a skylight though the skylight could be faired over on earlier aircraft. Later types were also slightly longer than earlier models.

From about 1937, all S series aircraft had wings lacking leading and trailing edge cutouts. Externally, the S series differed from the Custom or later C series in continuing with early C series features such as ailerons on both wings, linked by a prominent strut, and square edged rear side windows. Like most Waco aircraft, the S series were available with many different engines (identified by the first letter of the type designation).

== Operational history ==
The S series proved to be popular with both commercial and private pilots and over 50 were still airworthy in 2001, including examples of the CPTP VKS-7F version. During the Second World War several S series aircraft were impressed by the USAAF as the UC-72K or UC-72M and used as Liaison, executive light transport and instrument refresher training aircraft. Only a handful remain airworthy in this century.

== Variants ==
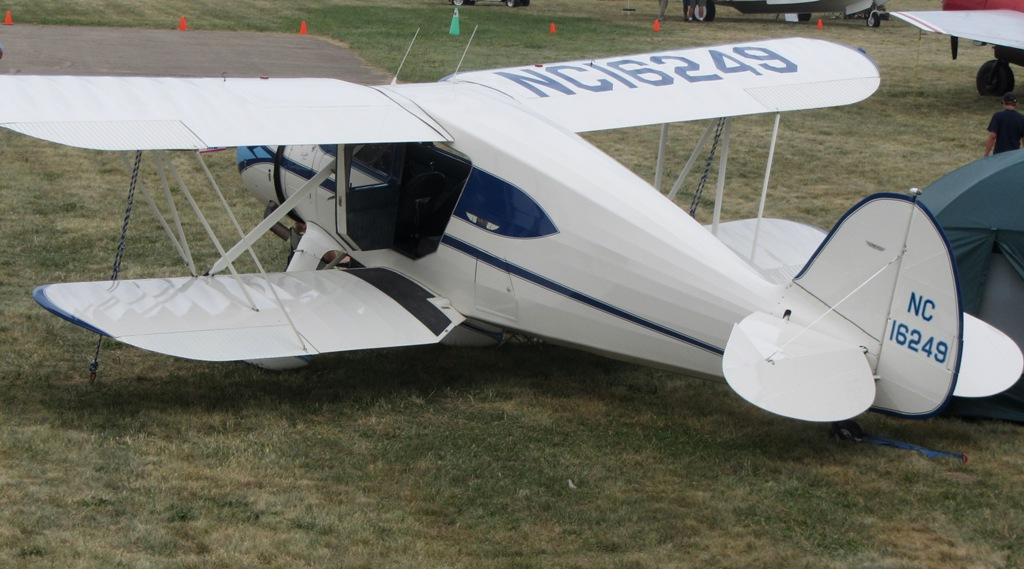
Waco YKS-6

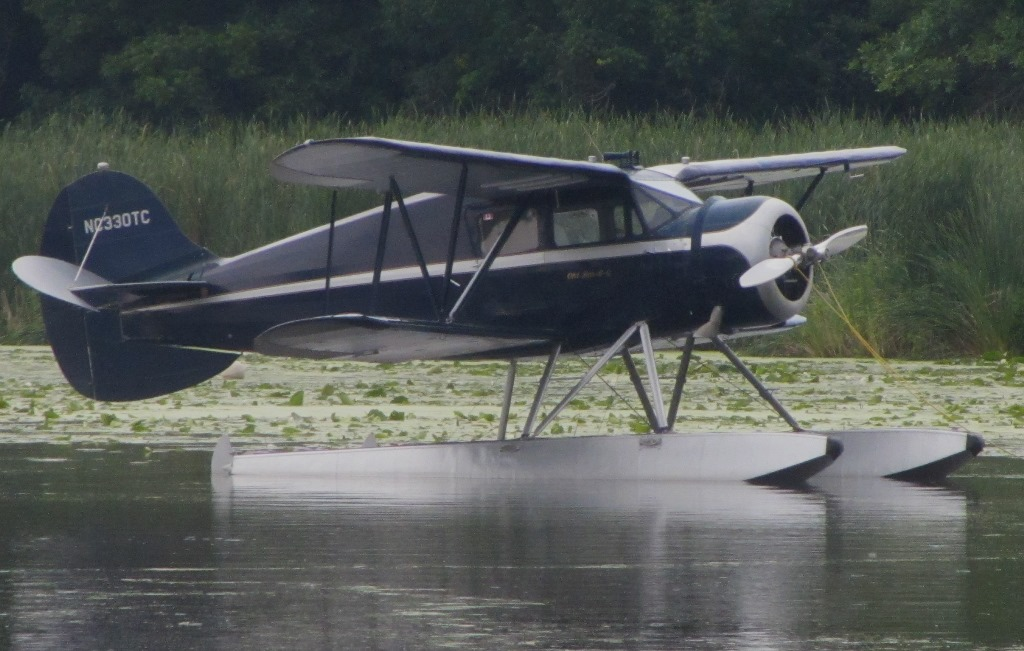
Waco ZKS-6

(per and)

DKS-6
HKS-7
300 hp (224 kW) Lycoming R-680-13
UKS-6
225 hp (168 kW) Continental W-670-K
UKS-7
225 hp (168 kW) Continental W-670-K
VKS-7
240 hp (179 kW) Continental W-670-M The -7F model was used in the CPTP program, F indicating that flaps were fitted.
VKS-7F
240 hp (179 kW) Continental W-670-M The -7F model was used in the CPTP program, F indicating that flaps were fitted.
YKS-6
225 hp (168 kW) Jacobs L-4
YKS-7
225 hp (168 kW) Jacobs L-4
ZKS-6
225 hp (168 kW) Jacobs L-5
ZKS-7
225 hp (168 kW) Jacobs L-4 or 285 hp (213 kW) Jacobs L-5
HKS-7
300 hp (224 kW) Lycoming R-680-13

== Specifications (VKS-7F) ==
Data from

General characteristics

- Crew: 1
- Capacity: 3 or 4 passengers
- Length: 25 ft 3 in (7.70 m)
- Wingspan: 33 ft 3 in (10.13 m)
- Height: 8 ft 6 in (2.59 m)
- Wing area: 244 sq ft (22.69 m^{2})
- Empty weight: 2,256 lb (1,023 kg)
- Gross weight: 3,250 lb (1,474 kg)
- Powerplant: 1 × Continental W-670-M , 240 hp (179 kW)

Performance

- Maximum speed: 145 mph (233 km/h, 126 kn)
- Cruise speed: 127 mph (204 km/h, 110 kn)
- Range: 518 mi (833 km, 450 nmi)
- Service ceiling: 13,000 ft (3,962 m)
- Rate of climb: 850 ft/min (4.3 m/s)
