= Waco E series =

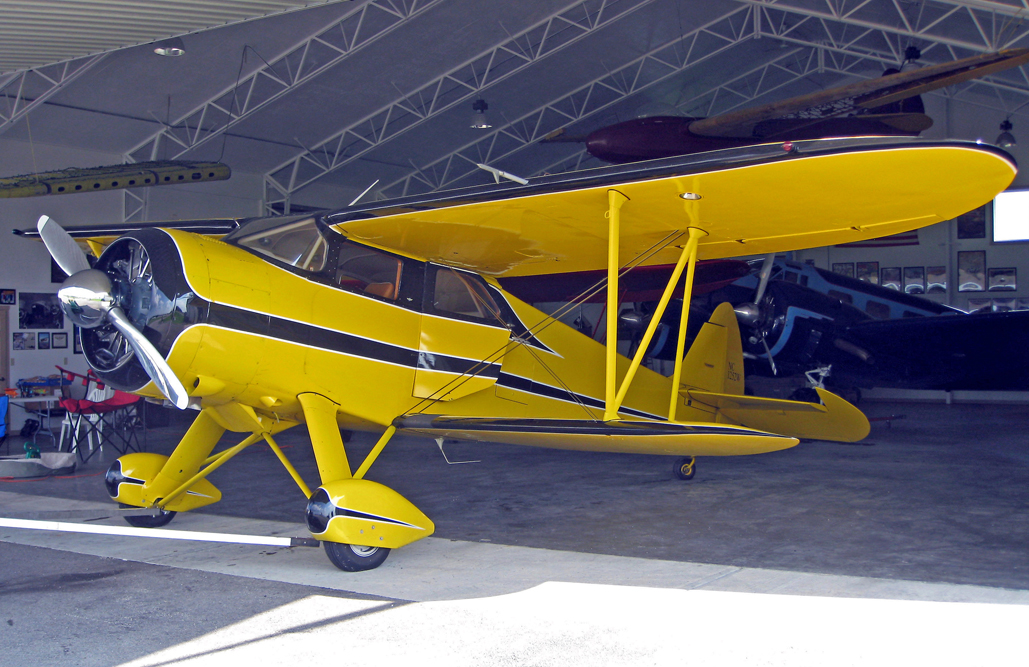
- Airworthy 1941-built Waco SRE at Poplar Grove Airport, near Belvidere, Illinois, in August 2010

General information
- Type: Four-seat cabin biplane
- National origin: United States
- Manufacturer: Waco Aircraft Company
- Status: some still flying in 2011
- Primary user: private owner pilots
- Number built: 30

History
- Manufactured: 1939–1942
- Introduction date: 1940
- First flight: 1939
- Developed from: Waco C series

The Waco E series is a small family of American-built cabin biplanes built between 1939 and 1942, which differed primarily by engine installation.

== Development and design ==
The E series was the final development of the prewar Waco line of biplane designs. A full four-seater, it had the best performance of any of the Wacos. First flown in 1939, it had a much slimmer and more streamlined fuselage than earlier Waco C and S models and heavily staggered unequal-span parallel-chord wings with rounded tips. Wings were plywood-skinned, and also had wire cross-bracing between the wings in place of the solid struts used on previous models.

Engines varied in power from 285 to 450 hp (213 to 336 kW), giving the E series a high cruising speed for the period of up to 195 mph (314 km/h). Production ceased in 1942. (Note: The Waco GXE of 1929/30 was an unrelated biplane design with non-staggered wings.)

== Operational history ==
The E series was sold to wealthier private pilot owners who required the comfort of a fully enclosed cabin and a high cruising speed, combined with a longer range. Because of the type's good performance, 15 examples were impressed by the United States Army Air Forces during World War II for communications work as the UC-72. Several of the USAAF examples were returned to civilian use after the end of the war and five E series aircraft remained airworthy in 2001.

== Variants ==
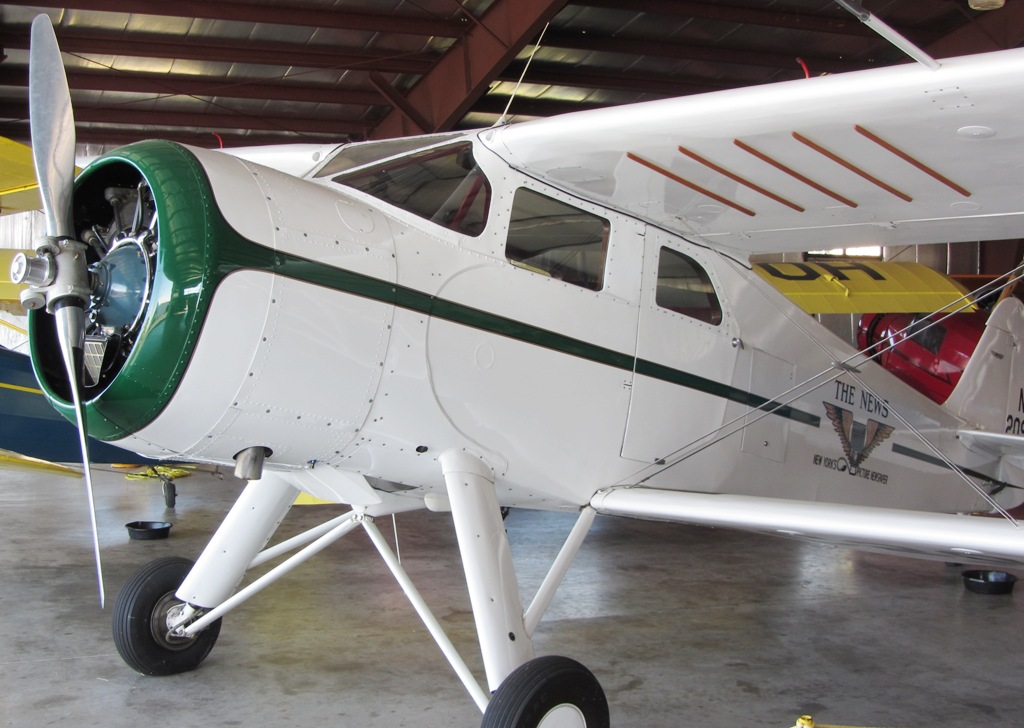
WACO ARE

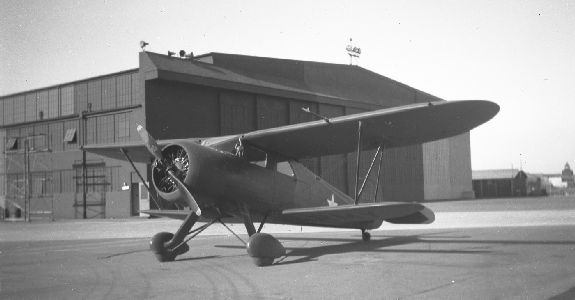
Waco SRE impressed as USAAF UC-72

(Source:)

ARE Aristocrat
300 hp (224 kW) Jacobs L-6 (4 built, one impressed as UC-72A)
HRE Aristocrat
285 hp (213 kW) Lycoming R-680 (5 built, 2 impressed as UC-72C)
SRE Aristocrat
400 hp (298 kW) Pratt & Whitney R-985 Wasp Junior SB-2 (21 built, 12 impressed as UC-72)
WRE Aristocrat
420 hp (313 kW) Wright R-975 - model offered to potential customers, but none built

=== Impressed aircraft ===
UC-72
12 impressed Waco SRE for USAAF
UC-72A
One impressed Waco ARE
UC-72C
Two impressed Waco HRE

== Specifications (SRE) ==
Data from

General characteristics

- Crew: 1 pilot
- Capacity: 3 passengers
- Length: 27 ft 10 in (8.48 m)
- Wingspan: 34 ft 9 in (10.59 m)
- Height: 8 ft 8 in (2.64 m)
- Empty weight: 2,734 lb (1,240 kg)
- Max takeoff weight: 4,200 lb (1,905 kg)
- Powerplant: 1 × Pratt & Whitney R-985 SB-2 nine-cylinder radial air-cooled piston, 400 hp (300 kW)

Performance

- Maximum speed: 202 mph (325 km/h, 176 kn)
- Cruise speed: 195 mph (314 km/h, 169 kn)
- Stall speed: 57 mph (92 km/h, 50 kn)
- Range: 1,070 mi (1,720 km, 930 nmi)
- Service ceiling: 23,500 ft (7,200 m)
- Rate of climb: 1,550 ft/min (7.9 m/s)

== See also ==
Aircraft of comparable role, configuration, and era

- Beech 17 Staggerwing
- Fairchild Model 45
- Howard DGA-15
- Spartan Executive
- Stinson Reliant

Related lists

- List of aircraft of World War II
