= Waco D series =

Series of aircraft

Waco D

General information
- Role: Multi-purpose military aircraft
- National origin: United States
- Manufacturer: Waco Aircraft Company
- Primary users: Uruguayan Air Force Nicaraguan Air Force, Cuban Army Air Force
- Number built: 13

The Waco D Series was a series of military biplanes created between 1934 and 1937 by the Waco Aircraft Company for export to countries other than the United States. The three letter designation indicated the engine, airframe, and series. Armed versions had a -A suffix.

== Development and design ==
In late 1932, WACO began development of a new type, the Model D, which would be suitable both for use by wealthy private pilots and for military use. The Model D was a single-engine two-seat biplane, which was fitted with a fixed tailwheel undercarriage. Its fuselage had a welded steel tube structure with fabric covering. The aircraft's single-bay wings were made of wood, with fabric covering, and were braced with 'N'-struts, while there was a cutout on the upper wing trailing edge to improve view for the pilot. The crew of two sat under an enclosed canopy, while the aircraft could be powered by one of a range of radial engines enclosed in a NACA cowling. For military use, one or two forward-firing Browning machine guns could be mounted under the lower wings, while the observer was provided with a flexibly mounted machine gun in the rear cockpit. A bomb rack could be mounted under the fuselage.

Work began on the prototype Model D, with the WACO designation WHD, began in early 1933. Flight testing revealed stability problems, and the aircraft was later scrapped. A second aircraft, with the designation S3HD (also known as the "Super Sport"), and powered by a 420 hp (310 kW) Pratt & Whitney R-985 Wasp Junior TB 9-cylinder radial engine, and configured as an unarmed sporting aircraft, followed in 1934. This differed from the prototype WHD in having slightly swept wings, a fuller fuselage that tapered less towards the rear, and an enlarged rudder. Small numbers of military versions followed from 1935, powered by various engines, for several Latin American air forces, with production continuing until 1938.

== Operational history ==
The S3HD (registration NC-14408) was sold to Miles Vernon of New York in 1934. Vernon owned the aircraft until 1944, after which it was largely unused and eventually dismantled. In 1963–1964, the S3HD was restored to flying condition.

In 1935, a company-owned demonstrator of the armed version was built, with the designation WHD-A. It was powered by a 440 hp (330 kW) Wright R-975-E Whirlwind. A single militarized S3HD-A, powered by a 420 hp (310 kW) Wasp Junior, was sold to Cuba in 1935, and was lost between July 1937 and July 1938. Six JHD-As, powered by 365 hp (272 kW) Wright Whirlwind engines, were sold to Uruguay in 1938. Nicaragua purchased three WHD-As in October 1938, powered by 420 hp (310 kW) Whirlwinds, but one crashed at Belize during delivery, and was replaced by the WHD-A demonstrator in April 1939. The Nicaraguan WHD-As remained in use until 1950.

== Variants ==
CHD
Multipurpose military biplane with 250 hp (190 kW) Wright J-6-7 Whirlwind radial engine.
JHD-A
Powered by 365 hp (272 kW) Wright Whirlwind radial engine. 6 exported to Uruguay.
S2HD
Multipurpose military export biplane with 450 hp (340 kW) Pratt & Whitney Wasp Junior SB radial engine. 1 exported to Cuba
S3HD
Multipurpose military biplane with 400 hp (300 kW) Pratt & Whitney Wasp Junior TB. 1 built.
S3HD-A
Armed variant of S3HD powered by Wasp Junior engine, (Note: Rated at 240 hp (180 kW) according to Robinson, and at 320 hp (240 kW) according to Aerofiles,) one exported to Cuba.
WHD
Multipurpose military biplane with 420 hp (310 kW) Wright J-6-9 Whirlwind engine. 5 built, including 4 exported to Nicaragua. Max speed: 191 mph, Cruise speed: 166 mph, Seats: 2
CMD
Multipurpose military biplane with 250 hp (190 kW) Wright J-6-7 Whirlwind. None built.

== Operators ==
Cuba

- Cuban Air Force - One S3HD-A delivered in 1935. Lost between June 1937 and July 1938.

Uruguay
Six JHD-As purchased in 1938.

== Specifications (JHD-A) ==
Data from Jane's All the World's Aircraft 1938

General characteristics

- Crew: 2
- Length: 25 ft 6 1/2 in (7.79 m)
- Wingspan: 32 ft 8 5/8 in (9.97 m)
- Height: 8 ft 11 1/2 in (2.73 m)
- Wing area: 256.3 sq ft (23.81 m^{2})
- Empty weight: 2,505 lb (1,136 kg)
- Gross weight: 3,800 lb (1,724 kg)
- Fuel capacity: 89 US gal (74 imp gal; 340 L)
- Powerplant: 1 × Wright R-975-E2 9-cylinder air-cooled radial engine, 350 hp (260 kW)at sea level

Performance

- Maximum speed: 170 mph (270 km/h, 150 kn) at sea level
- Cruise speed: 155 mph (249 km/h, 135 kn)
- Service ceiling: 15,500 ft (4,700 m)
- Rate of climb: 1,100 ft/min (5.6 m/s)

Armament

- Guns: 2× machine guns
