= Waco Mailplanes =

Waco JYM and JWM
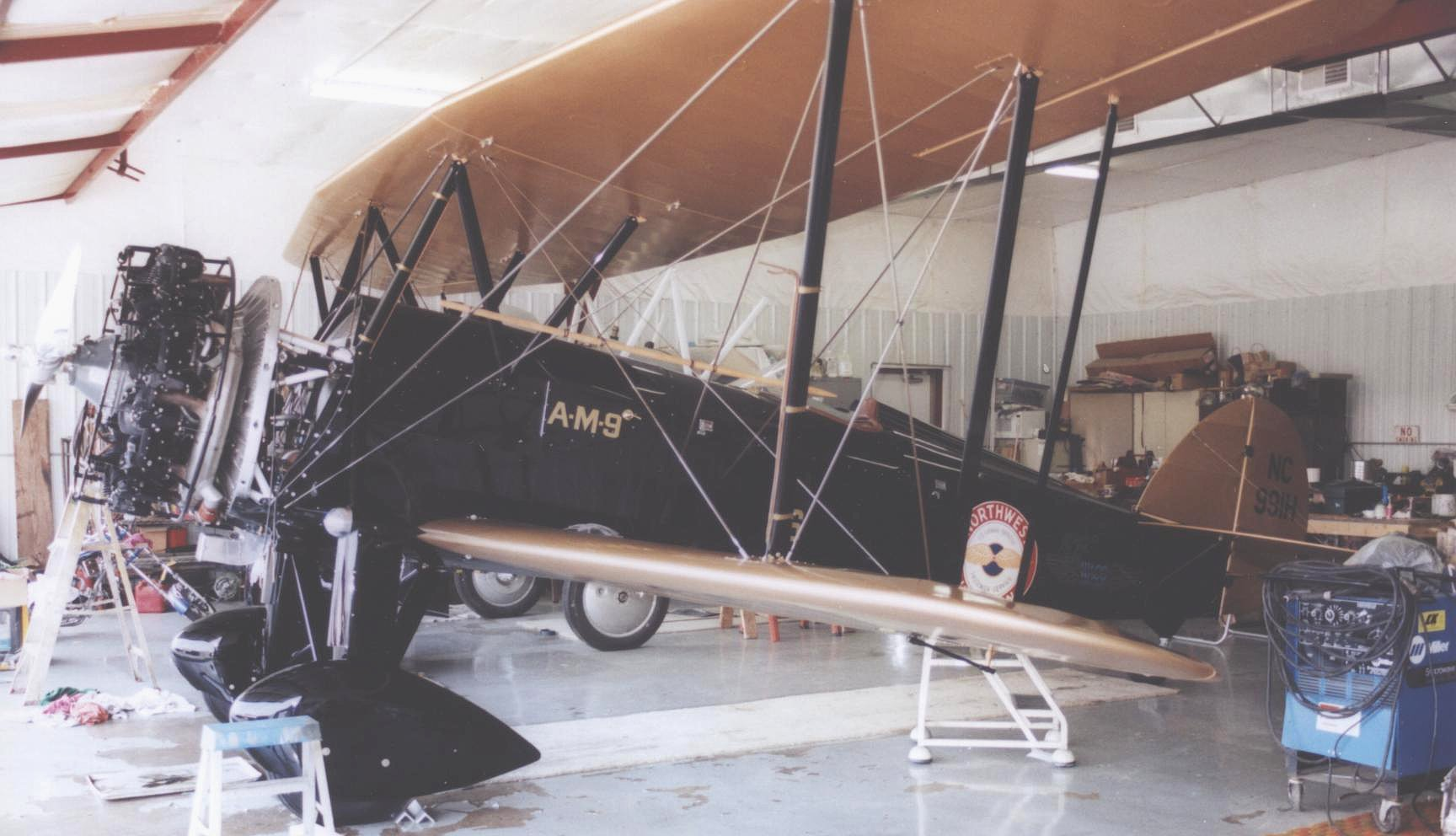
- Waco JYM taper-wing mailplane in the 1929 markings of Northwest Airways mail route CAM-9

General information
- Type: single-engine mailplanes
- National origin: United States
- Manufacturer: Waco Aircraft Company
- Status: two preserved in museums
- Primary user: early airlines
- Number built: 6

History
- Introduction date: 1929
- Developed from: Waco 10

The Waco Mailplanes are US-built open-cockpit biplane mailplanes from the late 1920s derived from the Waco 10 sports biplanes.

== Development ==
In order to meet the demand for mailplanes, Waco aircraft developed two models during 1929, the JYM and the JWM.

The JYM was a taperwing model based on the earlier ATO design but with a 14-inch fuselage stretch to provide further cargo capacity compared with the earlier design. It was powered by a 300 hp (220 kW) Wright J-6-9 engine and had a single seat cockpit for the pilot.

The JWM was a straight-wing model based on the ASO, also with a 14-inch longer fuselage and was fitted with a 330 hp (250 kW) Wright R-975 powerplant.

== Operational history ==
Four Waco JYM aircraft were delivered to Northwest Airways (later Northwest Airlines) in 1929 and were operated on the 892 mi (1,436 km) CAM-9 airmail route from Chicago to Minneapolis via Milwaukee, Madison and La Crosse. All four Waco JYM's still exist, with the third JYM NC631N on display at the Historic Aircraft Restoration Museum (HARM) at Dauster Field near St Louis, Missouri, wearing its 1929 NWAL CAM-9 route markings.

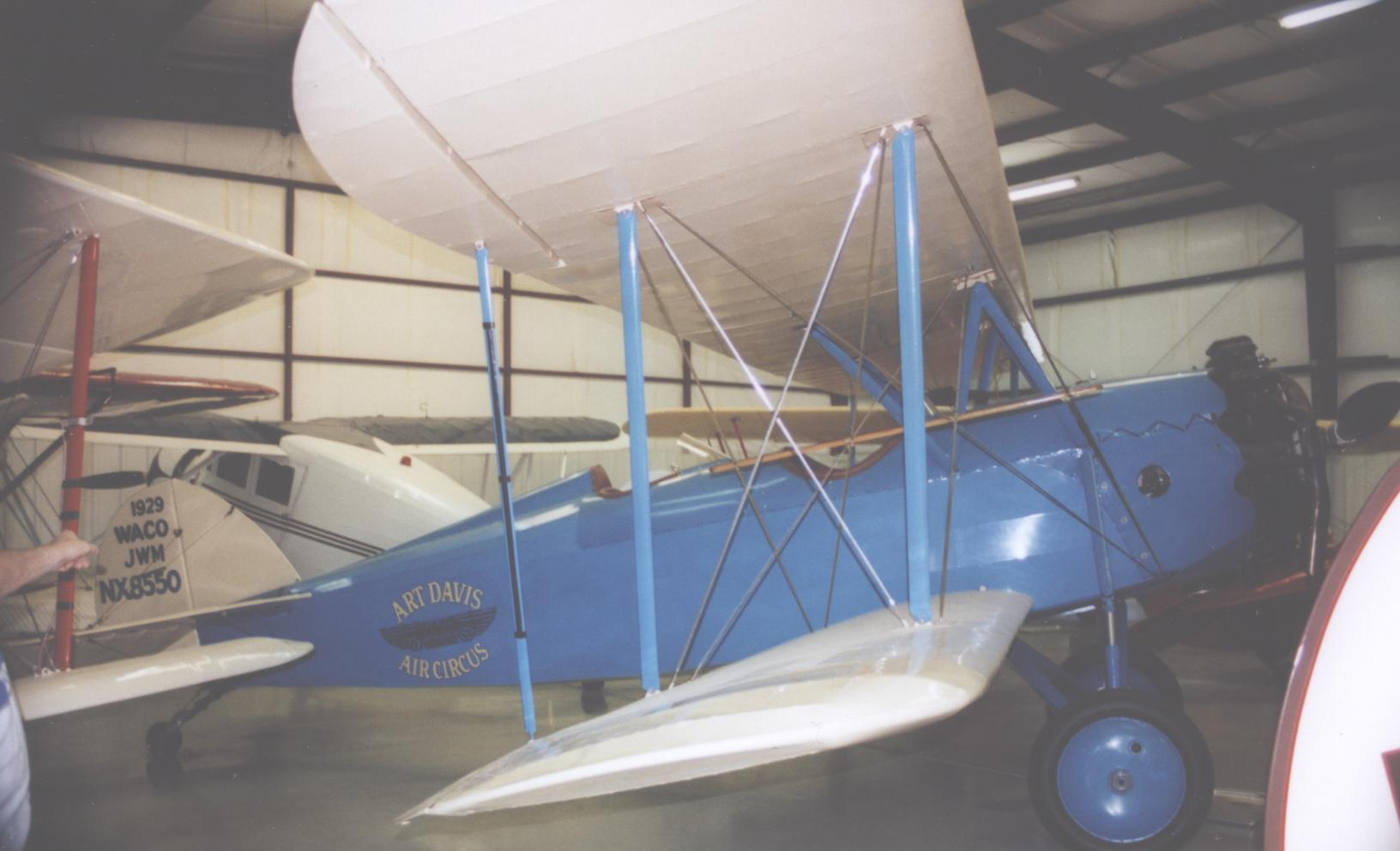
Waco JWM straight-wing mailplane of 1929 in the markings of "Art Davis Air Circus" displayed at HARM near St Louis

One Waco JWM aircraft was built. The sole survivor NX8550 is also preserved at HARM, wearing the markings of the "Art Davis Air Circus".

== Specifications (JYM) ==
Data from Aerofiles

General characteristics

- Crew: One
- Capacity: mail or cargo
- Powerplant: 1 × Wright J-6-9 , 300 hp (220 kW)

Performance
