= Waco N series =

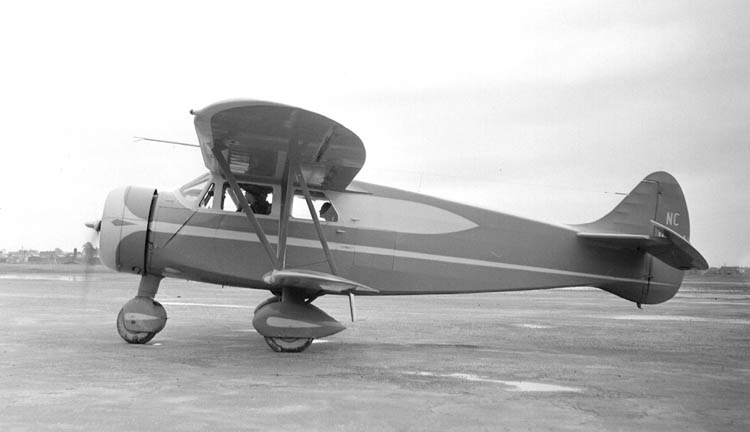
- Waco AVN-8 in 1938

General information
- Type: Four-seat tricycle undercarriage cabin biplane
- National origin: United States
- Manufacturer: Waco Aircraft Company
- Status: a few still airworthy in 2009
- Primary user: private owner pilots
- Number built: approx 20

History
- First flight: 1937
- Developed from: Waco C series

The Waco N series is a range of 1930s American-built cabin biplanes with a fixed tricycle undercarriage produced by the Waco Aircraft Company.

== Design and development ==
Waco introduced the luxury N-series biplane in 1937. It was based on the Waco C-series five-seat custom-cabin Waco with that model's curved pointed wings, but with an unusual fixed tricycle undercarriage and a modified tail with a lower rudder extension to give increased side area. The Waco N was fitted with flaps on all four wings to improve the aircraft's landing characteristics.

== Operational history ==
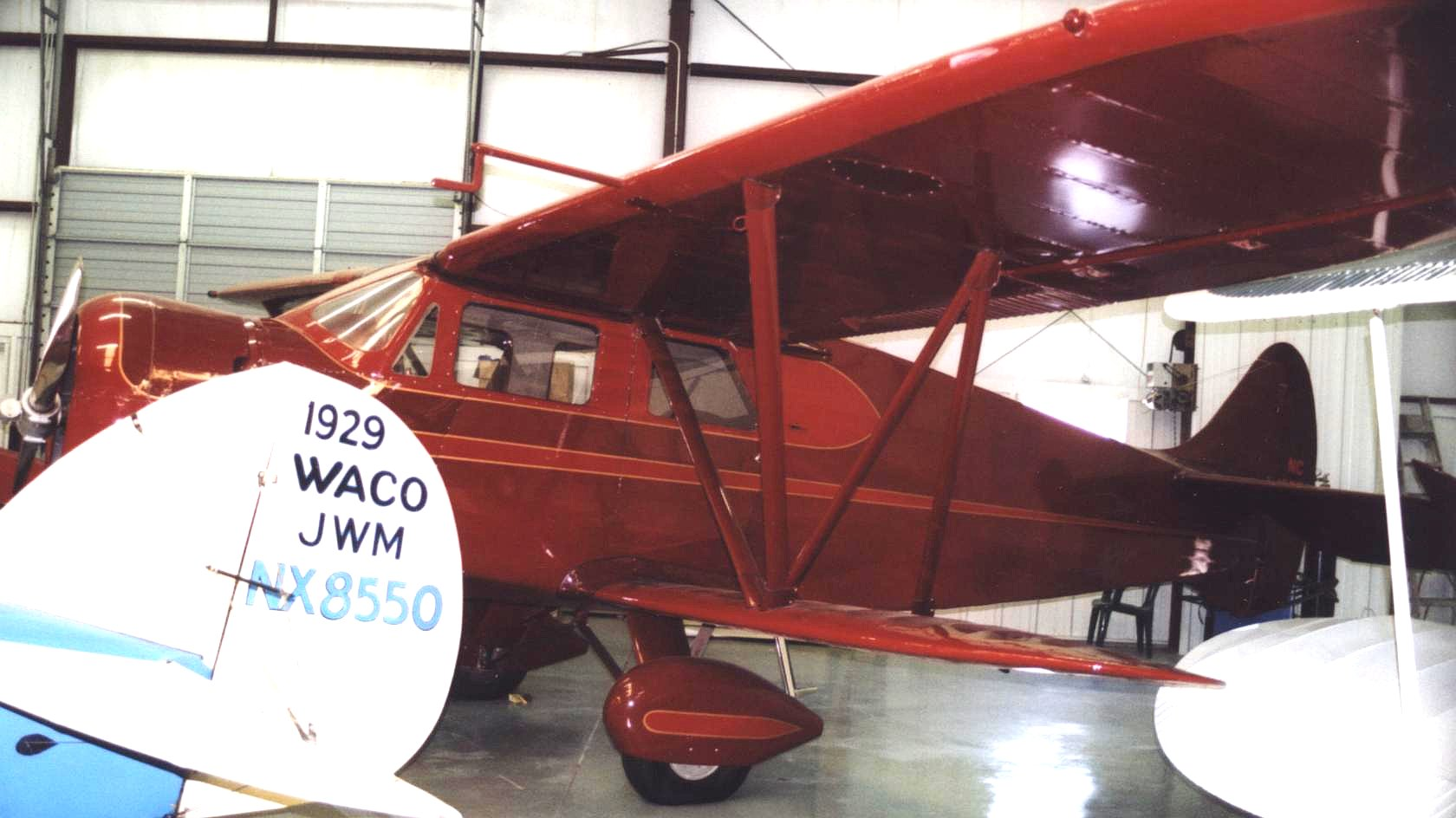
Airworthy 1938 Waco AVN-8 at the Historic Aircraft Restoration Museum.

The prototype, was designated ZVN-7, with the '7' indicating its year of manufacture (1937), and was powered by the 285 hp (213 kW) Jacobs L-5 engine. Only around 20 examples of the N series were completed, as the AVN-8, and ZVN-8. A few were impressed by the USAAC during the Second World War as the UC-72J and UC-72L. One AVN-8 was used by the Royal Aircraft Establishment at Farnborough, Hampshire, for trials with tricycle landing gear.

An example of the AVN-8 is maintained in airworthy condition by the Historic Aircraft Restoration Museum at Creve Coeur Airport near St Louis Missouri.

== Variants ==
ZVN-7 and ZVN-8
285 hp (213 kW) Jacobs L-5
AVN-8
330 hp (246 kW) Jacobs L-6 engine

== Specifications (AVN-8) ==
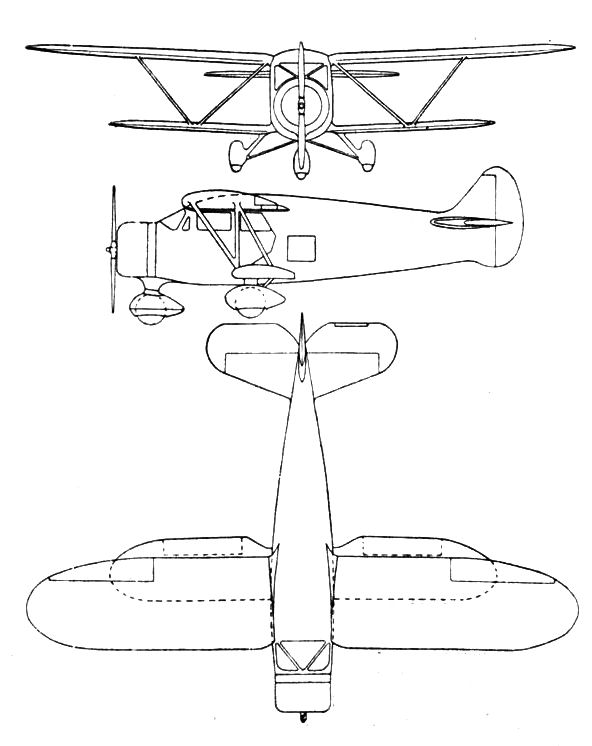
Waco ZVN-7 3-view drawing from L'Aerophile January 1938

Data from

General characteristics

- Crew: 1
- Capacity: 3 passengers
- Length: 27 ft 7 in (8.41 m)
- Wingspan: 34 ft 9 in (10.59 m)
- Height: 8 ft 6 in (2.59 m)
- Wing area: 246 sq ft (22.9 m^{2})
- Empty weight: 2,493 lb (1,131 kg)
- Gross weight: 3,800 lb (1,724 kg)
- Powerplant: 1 × Jacobs L-6 seven-cylinder radial air-cooled , 330 hp (250 kW)

Performance

- Maximum speed: 161 mph (259 km/h, 140 kn)
- Cruise speed: 151 mph (243 km/h, 131 kn)
- Service ceiling: 14,200 ft (4,300 m)
- Rate of climb: 900 ft/min (4.6 m/s)
