= Jacobs Aircraft Engine Company =

American aircraft engine manufacturer (1926–1945)

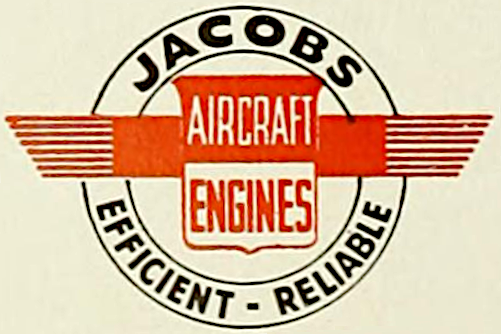
- Industry: Aerospace
- Founded: January 1, 1926
- Founder: Albert R. Jacobs
- Defunct: July 22, 1957
- Fate: Dissolved
- Headquarters: Pottstown, Pennsylvania, United States
- Parent: Republic Industries (1946–1947, 1950–1956)

The Jacobs Aircraft Engine Company was an American aircraft engine manufacturer that existed from 1926 to 1956.

== History ==
=== Early years ===
Fischer and Jacobs was formed in 1927 in Philadelphia. It moved to Camden, New Jersey and was renamed the Aircraft Engine Corporation. At the end of 1929, it announced plans to build a 11,250-square-foot (1,045 m^{2}) factory at Central Airport there. It was renamed the Jacobs Aircraft Engine Company in mid 1930. The company demonstrated a new engine – the two-cylinder, 20–25 hp (15–19 kW) B-1 – in August 1930 and began production of it less than a month later. It introduced three new engines in 1931: the seven-cylinder, 150 hp (110 kW) A-1; the three-cylinder, 60 hp (45 kW) B-2 and the two-cylinder, 25 hp (19 kW) B-3.

The company moved to Pottstown, Pennsylvania in 1932 after purchasing the machine workshop of the Light Manufacturing and Foundry Company.

By 1933, Jacobs had developed its most famous engine, the L-4 seven-cylinder air-cooled radial, with a power rating of 225 hp (168 kW) displacement of 757.7 cu in (12,416 cc). It was better known by its military designation, R-755. At the time it became known as the best producer of engines in the 200-400 horsepower range. Jacobs was the first to start making engines using forged aluminum alloy pistons, sodium-filled exhaust valves, and magnesium alloy crankcases.

The L-4 was used mostly on the Cessna Bobcat, Cessna 195, and Stearman Kaydet. Due to the tendency of the engine to vibrate heavily at low rpm, it was given the nicknames Shakin' Jake and Shakey Jake.

Later developments included the 285 hp L-5 or R-830, and 330 hp L-6 or R-915.

=== World War II ===
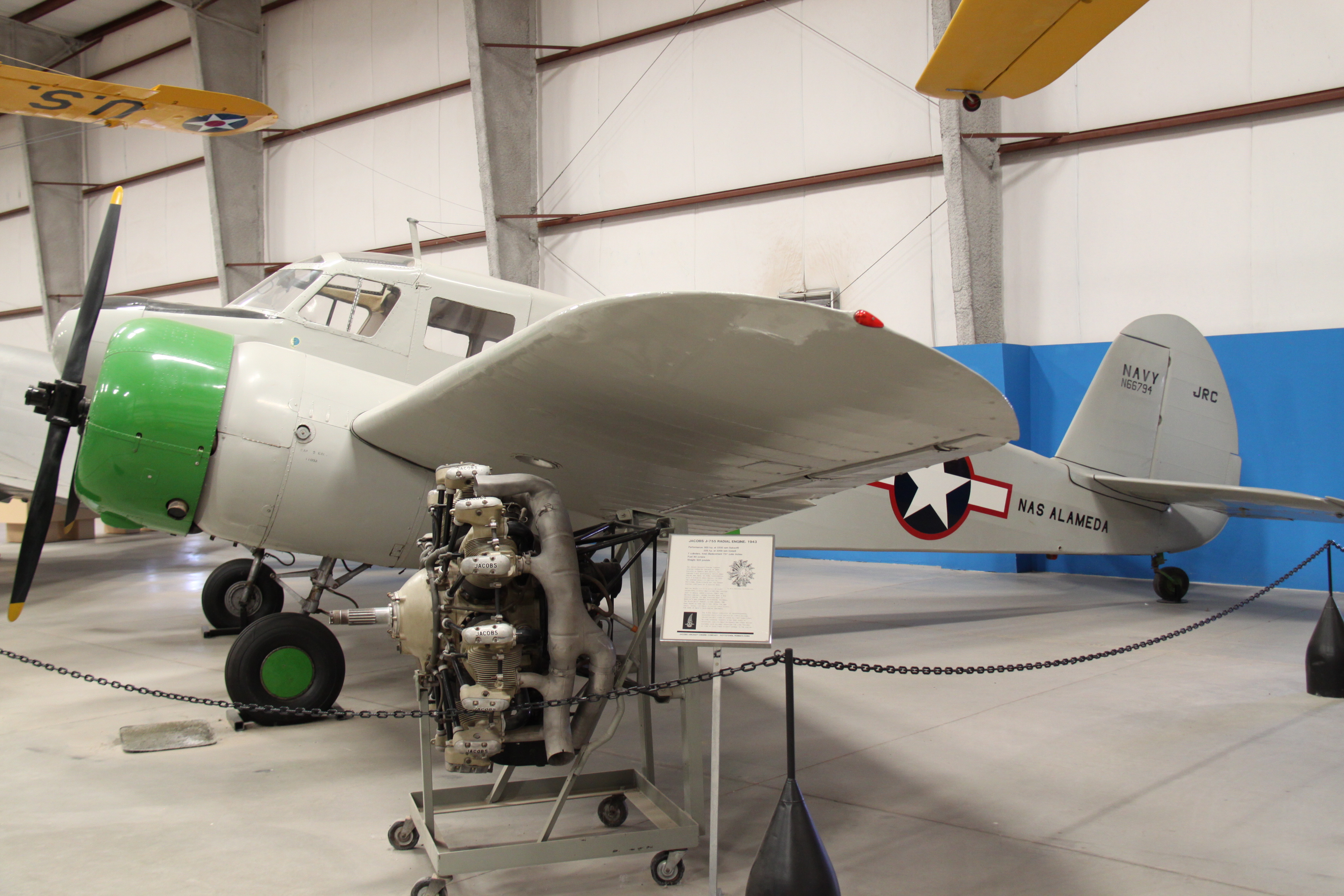
A Cessna Bobcat displayed with a Jacobs L-4 (R-755) engine, Pima Air & Space Museum, 2013

The company constructed a new factory in 1942 to handle the expansion of production for the military. During World War II, it produced approximately 32,200 engines, of which 20,300 were R-755s or R-915s. It also built engines under license from Pratt & Whitney.

=== Postwar ===
Jacobs was acquired by Republic Industries in 1945, which was in turn acquired by Barium Steel Corporation in 1946. However in 1947, the company was sold back to Albert Jacobs. Jacobs Aircraft Engines went into default in 1950 and was again sold back to Republic. Finally, Barium sold the company in December 1956 and it closed a few months later in 1957.

Page Industries, located in Oklahoma, purchased the rights to the designs in the 1970s.

== Applications ==
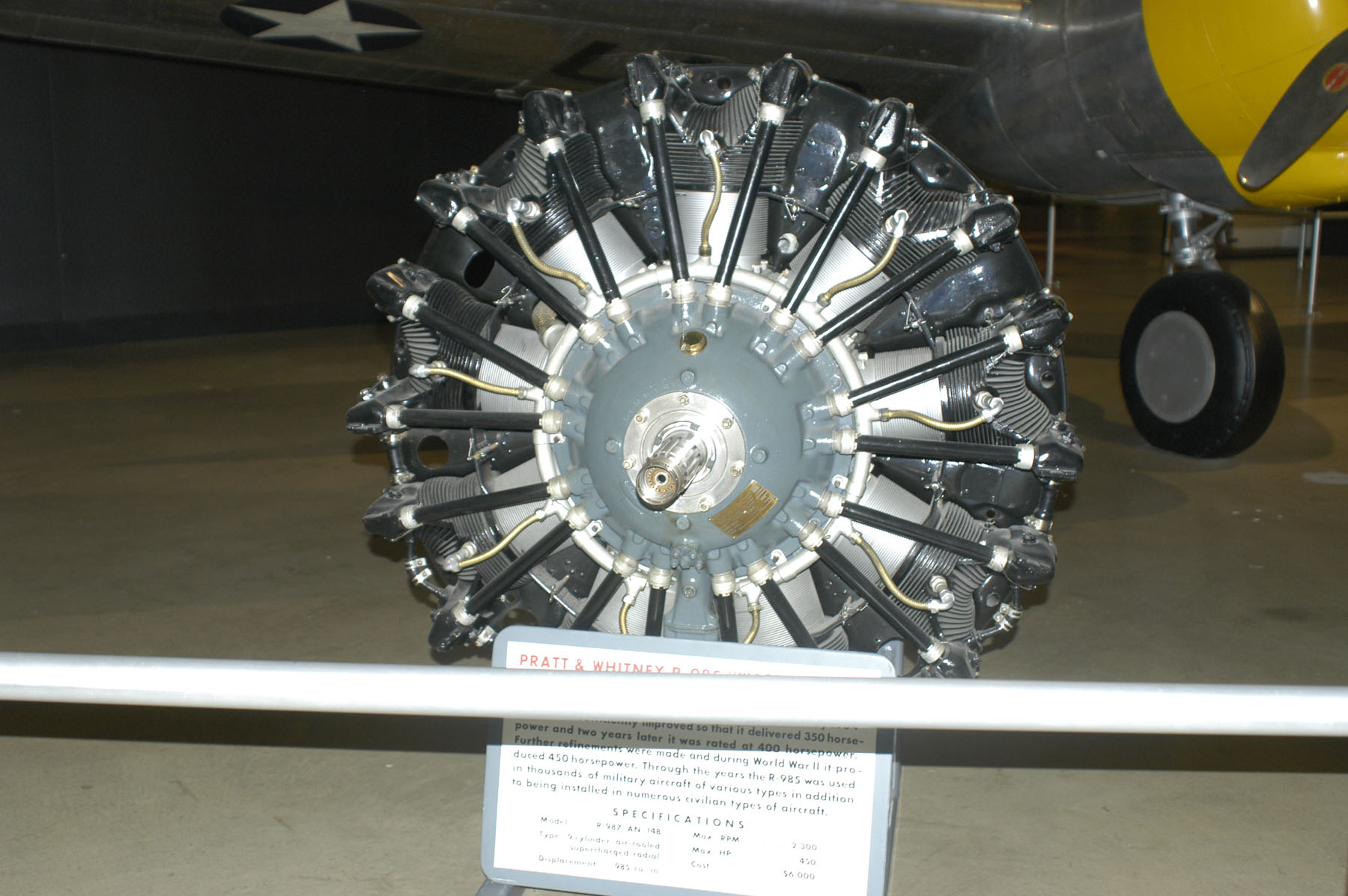
A Pratt & Whitney R-985 engine, produced by Jacobs during World War II

Jacobs engines were fitted to many US-built aircraft of the inter-war period, including several Waco models. They were in use in 26 different countries including in Canada, where 330 horsepower L6-MB engines were used to power the Royal Canadian Air Force's Avro Anson Mk. II aircraft. In 1941, the American War Department gave the contract to Jacobs to produce Pratt & Whitney R-985 and R-1340 engines until 1945. Jacobs ranked 87th among United States corporations in the value of World War II military production contracts.

== Products ==
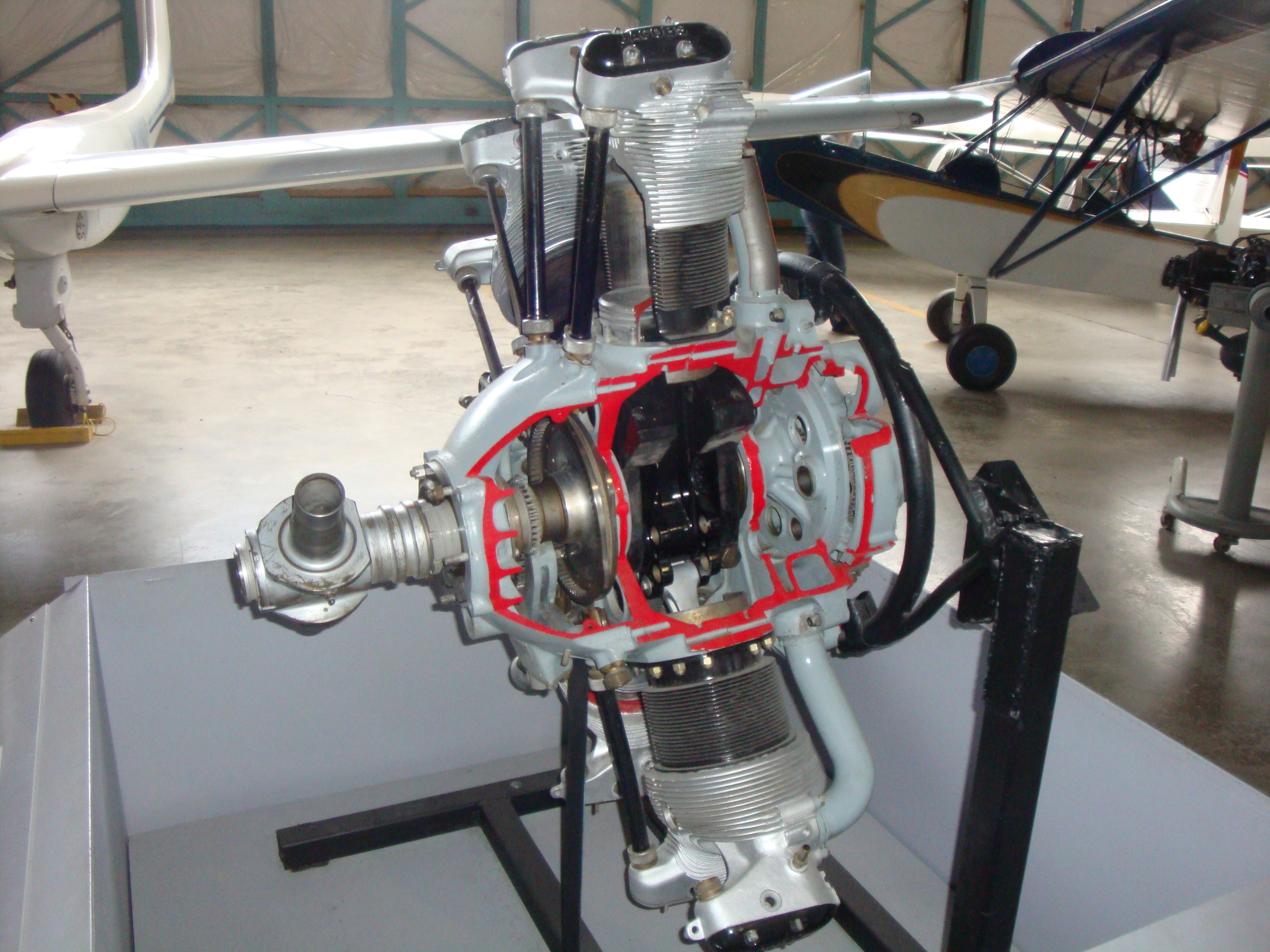
A sectioned Jacobs L-6, Wings Over the Rockies Air and Space Museum

Model name	Configuration	Power
Jacobs LA-1	R7	150 hp
Jacobs LA-2	R7	195 hp
Jacobs L-3	R3	51 hp
Jacobs L-4	R7	225 hp
Jacobs L-5	R7	285 hp
Jacobs L-6	R7	330 hp

== See also ==
- Franklin Engine Company
- List of aircraft engine manufacturers
- List of aircraft engines
