= Jacobs R-830 =

285 hp radial aircraft engine

R-830
- Type: Radial engine
- Manufacturer: Jacobs Aircraft Engine Company
- First run: 1935
- Developed from: Jacobs R-755
- Developed into: Jacobs R-915

The Jacobs R-830 or L-5 is a seven-cylinder, air-cooled, radial engine for aircraft manufactured in the United States by the Jacobs Aircraft Engine Company, beginning in 1935.

== Design and development ==
The R-830 was effectively an enlargement of the R-755 with strengthened stressed parts. With a bore and stroke of 5.0 in × 5.5 in (140 mm × 127 mm) the displacement was 831 cu in (13.6 L), takeoff power was around 285 hp (212 kW). The engine features steel cylinders with aluminum-alloy cylinder heads.

== Variants ==
L-5
Dual battery
L-5M
Dual magneto

== Applications ==
- Beechcraft Model 18B & S18B Expeditor
- Beechcraft B17B and C17B Staggerwing
- Fleet 50J Freighter (prototype only)
- Fleetwings Sea Bird
- Howard DGA-9
- Spartan 7X Executive (prototype only)
- Waco ZKC-S, ZKS-6 & 7 Standard Cabins
- Waco YOC-1 ZQC-6 ZGC-7 Custom Cabins
- Waco ZVN-8 Custom Cabin
- Waco ZPF-6 and ZPF-7

== Specifications (L-5) ==
Data from FAA TCDS

=== General characteristics ===
- Type: 7-cylinder air-cooled radial piston engine
- Bore: 5.5 in (140 mm)
- Stroke: 5.0 in (127 mm)
- Displacement: 831 cu in (13.6 L)
- Dry weight: 515 lb (234 kg)

=== Components ===
- Valvetrain: 2 valves per cylinder (pushrod-actuated); sodium cooled exhaust valves
- Fuel system: Stromberg NA-R7A carburetor
- Fuel type: 73 octane
- Cooling system: Air-cooled
- Reduction gear: Direct drive, right hand tractor

=== Performance ===
- Power output: 285 hp (212 kW) at 2,000 rpm at sea level
- Compression ratio: 6:1
- Power-to-weight ratio: 0.55 hp/lb (0.9 kW/kg)

== See also ==
Related development

- Jacobs R-755
- Jacobs R-915

Comparable engines

- Armstrong Siddeley Cheetah

Related lists

- List of aircraft engines
