= Howard Aircraft Corporation =

US aircraft manufacturer, 1937–1944

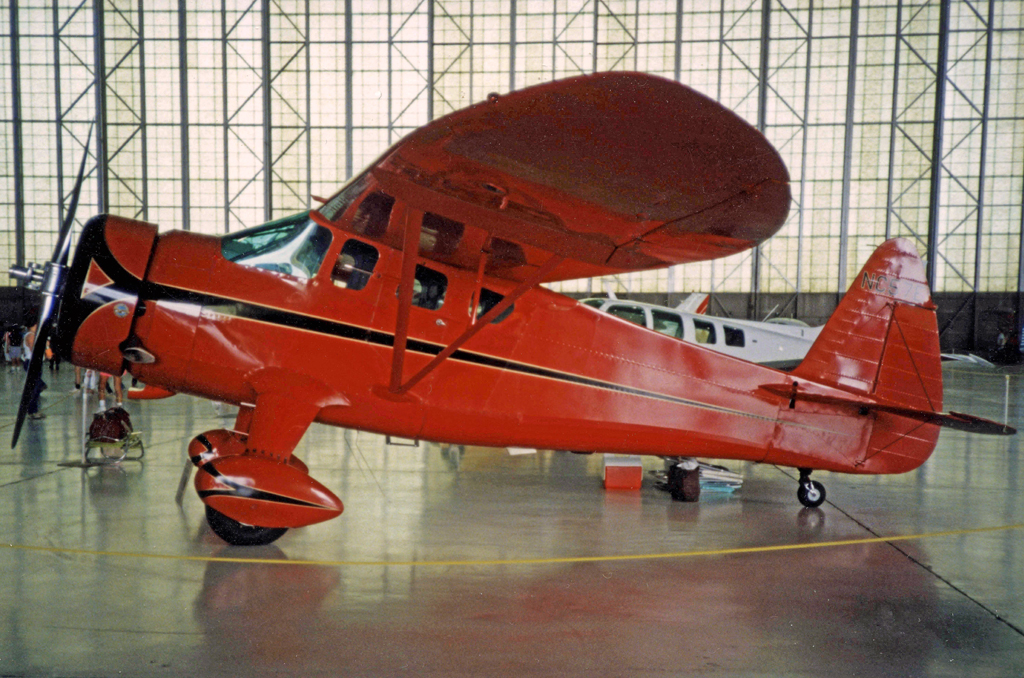
- A Howard DGA-11 on display in 1990
- Company type: Privately held company
- Industry: Aerospace
- Founded: 1937
- Founders: Ben Howard
- Headquarters: Chicago, Illinois, United States
- Key people: Gordon Israel
- Products: Aircraft

Howard Aircraft Corporation was a small United States aircraft manufacturer in the 1930s and 1940s. The factory was initially on the south side of Chicago Municipal Airport at 5301 W. 65th Street; during World War II a second plant was opened at DuPage Airport west of Chicago.

== Early history ==
Designer Ben "Benny" Howard, after his success with smaller aircraft, designed and built the Mister Mulligan, a successful 4-seat cross-country racer that also proved a worthy closed-course mount. While Beechcraft had designed and produced their Staggerwing for the private market, that aircraft was mechanically and structurally complex; Howard instead chose to emulate (on a larger scale) the simpler Monocoupe design. After winning both the Bendix and Thompson trophies in 1935, Howard turned to the formation of the Howard Aircraft Company - later Howard Aircraft Corporation on January 1, 1937, to produce commercial versions of the now-famous DGA cabin monoplanes, each custom-built by Ben Howard and Gordon Israel.

One of the airplanes produced by the company was the DGA-11, powered by a nine-cylinder 450 horsepower (340 kW) Pratt & Whitney R-985 Wasp Junior radial engine, was purportedly the fastest four-seat civil aircraft of the late 1930s, able to achieve a top speed of about 200 miles (320 km) per hour. A favorite of the high society and Hollywood circles, the DGA-11 cost about $16,500 in 1938 — a princely sum for the time. A slower and less costly version, the DGA-12, used a 300 horsepower (220 kW) Jacobs engine.

Production of the Howard Aircraft Corporation from 1936 to 1939 totaled about 30 aircraft. In 1939, Howard developed the 5-place DGA-15, building about 40 of the four/five-place aircraft, powered by one of three different engines. The founder, Ben Howard, left the company at this time to join Douglas Aircraft Company as test pilot.

== Wartime production ==
The onset of World War II signaled the end of the civil Howard aircraft line. The U.S. Navy procured about 525 modified DGA-15s for use as the GH-2 Nightingale air ambulance, the GH-1 and GH-3 utility transport, and the NH-1 instrument trainer aircraft. Exceptionally roomy and high-powered, the modified DGA-15 was also difficult to land and quite unforgiving—earning the unwanted nickname of “Ensign Eliminator.” The U.S. Army Air Corps also acquired a variety of prewar Howard aircraft as utility aircraft.

Howard also produced a two-seat open-cockpit DGA-18 trainer (also referred to as DGA-125), and later a license-built version of the Fairchild PT-23.

Many of the U.S. Navy Howard-built aircraft were sold to civil pilot owners postwar and a number were still airworthy in 2012.

After producing several of the most famous racing and private aircraft of the Golden Age of Aviation, the Howard Aircraft Corporation ceased production in 1944. Stockholders elected not to produce civilian aircraft after the war, sold the aviation assets, and used the proceeds to buy an electric-motor manufacturing company in Racine, Wisconsin, and named it Howard Industries.

== Aircraft ==
Model name	First flight	Number built	Type
Howard DGA-1			
Howard DGA-2			
Howard DGA-3		1	Open cockpit racer
Howard DGA-4	1932	2	Open cockpit racer
Howard DGA-5			
Howard DGA-6	1934	1	Cabin racer
Howard DGA-7			
Howard DGA-8	1936	18	Cabin monoplane
Howard DGA-9		7	Cabin monoplane
Howard DGA-11		4	Cabin monoplane
Howard DGA-12		2	Cabin monoplane
Howard DGA-15		520	Cabin monoplane
Howard DGA-18	1941	~60	Open cockpit basic trainer
