= Howard DGA-4 =

Howard DGA-4 and DGA-5
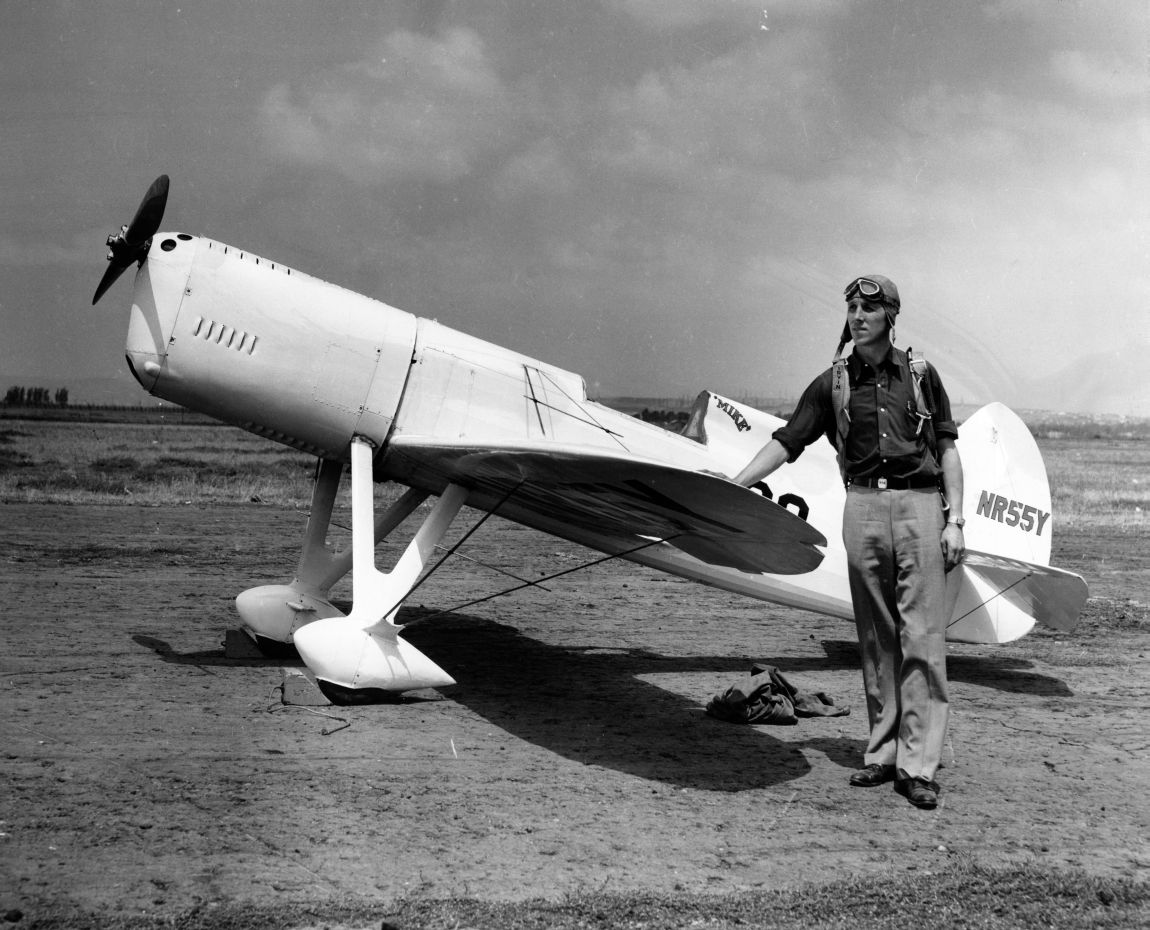
- DGA-4 (NR55Y) "Mike"

General information
- Type: Racing aircraft
- National origin: United States of America
- Designer: Ben Howard
- Number built: 2

History
- First flight: 1932

The Howard DGA-4 a.k.a. Mike, and DGA-5 a.k.a. Ike and "Miss Chevrolet" was the next in a series of racers from Ben Howard. He built two examples, "Mike" and "Ike", each with a different landing gear design.

== Design and development ==
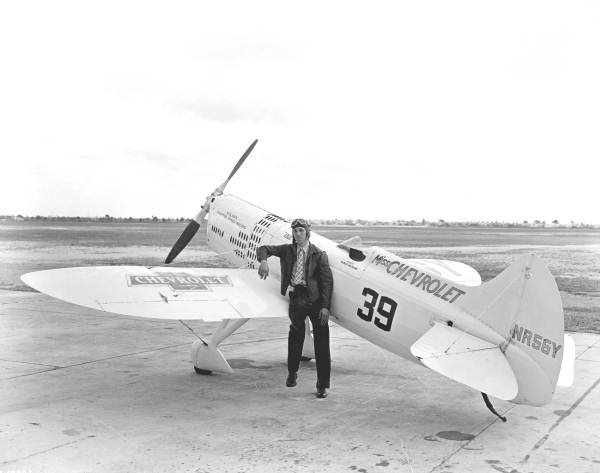
Howard DGA-5 "Ike"/"Miss Chevrolet" NR56Y

In 1932 work started on a larger follow-on racer to Howard's "Pete" racer. Both aircraft were built to ATC design requirements for ATC racing that never came about.

The DGA-4 was a low-wing, wire braced monoplane. Ventilation came from 30 holes drilled into the windscreen.

== Operational history ==
- 1932 National Air Races - "Ike" flown by Howard finished with two firsts and one second-place finish. Pilot Bill Ong flew "Mike" to one second, one fourth and two fifth-place finishes.
- 1932 Thompson Trophy race - Bill Ong placed seventh in "Ike".
- 1932 Women's Free for all - Gladys O'Donnell piloted "Ike".
- 1933 American Air Races - Pilot Harold Neumann flew "Ike" with the tandem wheels converted back to a single wheel configuration. Howard placed third in one event, then went on to fly the Folkerts SK-1 for the remainder of the races.
- 1933 National Air Races - Pilot Roy Minor won four firsts, two seconds, two thirds and one fourth place in "Mike".
- 1933 John H. Livingston crashed his Cessna CR-3, and flew "Mike" around the country as part of the Curtiss Candy Company "Baby Ruth" airshow team.
- 1933 International Air Races - Roy Minor won four firsts and one third place at 199.87 mph, racing against Gordon Israel, "Mike's" own designer.
- 1934 National Air Races - Pilot Roy Hunt won two fifth places in "Mike". Harold Neumann won two fourths in "Ike".
- 1935 National Air Races - Nicknamed the "Benny Howard National Air Races" due to the number of victories. Harold Neumann finished with three firsts in "Mike". "Ike" was sponsored by Chevrolet and was renamed "Miss Chevrolet". "Ike"s fuel system was modified to win the World's fastest inverted speed record. Pilot Neumann missed the race, after the gear collapsed on "Ike", but won the Thompson Trophy in Howard's DGA-6, "Mr. Mulligan.
- 1936 National Air Races - Harold Neumann flew "Mike" to 223.714 mph (360 km/h) on a speed dash. Pilot Jacobsen flew "Mike" in the Greve race, nosing over on landing.
- 1937 National Air Races - Both "Mike" and "Ike" could not fly due to engine trouble. "Ike" continued to fly as part of Fordon-Brown Air Shows.
- 1939 National Air Races - "Mike" and "Ike" were sold and repainted yellow, but not raced again.

"Ike" and "Mike" are currently undergoing restoration in Hinckley, Ohio by P & K Airmotive, INC> .

== Variants ==
- Howard DGA-4 "Mike" - Mike and Ike were virtually identical, except that Mike had a super charged Menasco B-6S and a slightly different landing gear structure. Mike featured more cooling louvers and a cowling designed for a spinner. In 1933, many of the louvers were closed in, and smaller wheels were used.
- Howard DGA-5 "Ike" - Ike featured a unique landing gear with two small wheels spaced one behind the other, with a wheel pant covering both. This landing gear was replaced with a single wheel configuration in 1933. Ike also used a higher octane fuel in races and had a Menasco B-6 (S/N 6008) rated at 160 HP at 1975 RPM.

== Aircraft on display ==
The Port Townsend Aero Museum in Port Townsend, Washington has a replica of "Mike" on display

Kermit Weeks' Fantasy of Flight museum has a replica of "Ike" on display

== Specifications (Howard DGA-4) ==
Data from Sport Aviation

General characteristics

- Capacity: 1
- Length: 17 ft (5.2 m)
- Wingspan: 20 ft 1 in (6.12 m)
- Wing area: 67 sq ft (6.2 m^{2})
- Airfoil: NACA M6
- Empty weight: 919 lb (417 kg)
- Gross weight: 1,194 lb (542 kg)
- Powerplant: 1 × Menasco Buccaneer 485 cubic inch inline, 200 hp (150 kW)

Performance

- Maximum speed: 209 kn (241 mph, 388 km/h)
- Cruise speed: 152 kn (175 mph, 282 km/h)
