= Younkin-Dake Mullicoupe =

Mullicoupe
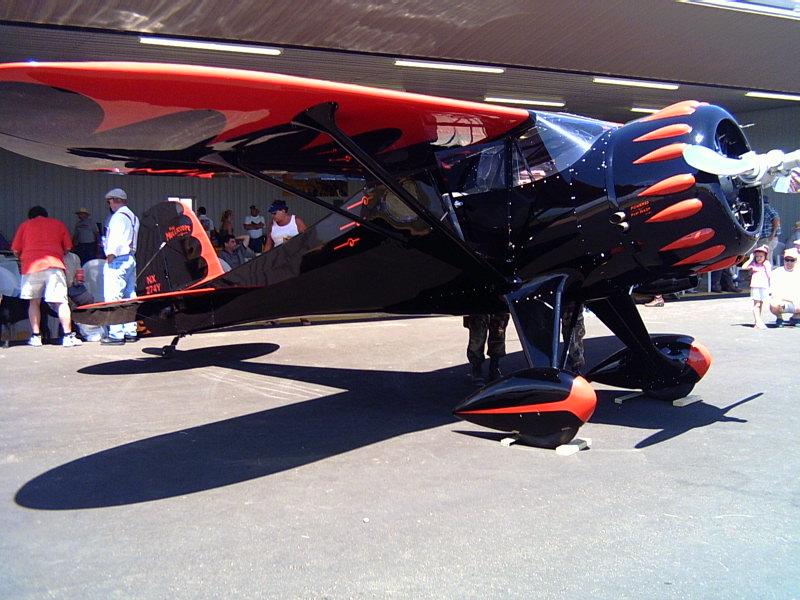
- Mullicoupe at Vintage Aero Flying Museum, March 2007

General information
- Type: Light Trainer and Racer
- Manufacturer: Younkin-Dake
- Designer: Jim Younkin
- Status: 2 still flying 3 flying in 2003
- Primary user: Civil Aviation
- Number built: 3

History
- Introduction date: 1989

A Younkin-Dake Mullicoupe is a two-place monoplane modeled on a Monocoupe 90 and Mister Mulligan, a Howard DGA-6.

== History ==
Jim Younkin of Springdale, Arkansas completed a frame of this aircraft in 1989 and a homebuilt model earlier in 1985 with the help from Bud Dake. Three Mullicoupes were flying by 1997. The idea of this design came to Younkin and Dake at the Ottumwa, Iowa Antique Airplane Association's Fly-In in 1982 after a discussion about Younkin's Mister Mulligan. Bud Dake suggested they design a 2-seat aircraft which would be as fast as the Mister Mulligan but powered by a smaller P&W R-985 engine. Younkin then designed a scale model which was somewhat of a cross between the Benny Howard-designed Mister Mulligan but with the fuselage shape of a Monocoupe. The Mullicoupes are a clean-sheet design utilizing a steel tube fuselage double-covered in fabric with built up wood wings skinned in aircraft plywood. The airfoil used on the Mullicoupe is the NACA 23012 having a chord of 63", but with an elliptical and tapered planform. The flaps are full Fowler flaps that travel on hidden hinges built into the wings, which is another Younkin original design.

=== Today ===
Three original Mullicoupes were created and a fourth was started but never finished. At present they are owned by Mark Holliday, Mr. Younkin himself, and Red Lerille. A fourth Mullicoupe, owned by Stein Bruch of Minnesota, is being completed with the assistance of Jim Younkin. The Black/Red Mullicoupe N274Y which was completed by Bud Dake (deceased) is owned by Mark Holliday, is on display and flies at the Vintage Aero Flying Museum, Platte Valley Airpark, Hudson, Colorado. Mr. Holliday is known to travel extensively with this black and red Mullicoupe, making appearances at fly-ins around the American Midwest.

The Red Younkin-owned Mullicoupe N273X suffered a loss of power which resulted in a forced landing in a field near Siloam Springs, Arkansas on November 10, 2009. The aircraft suffered significant damage, but is currently being repaired.

== Specifications (Mullicoupe original version) ==
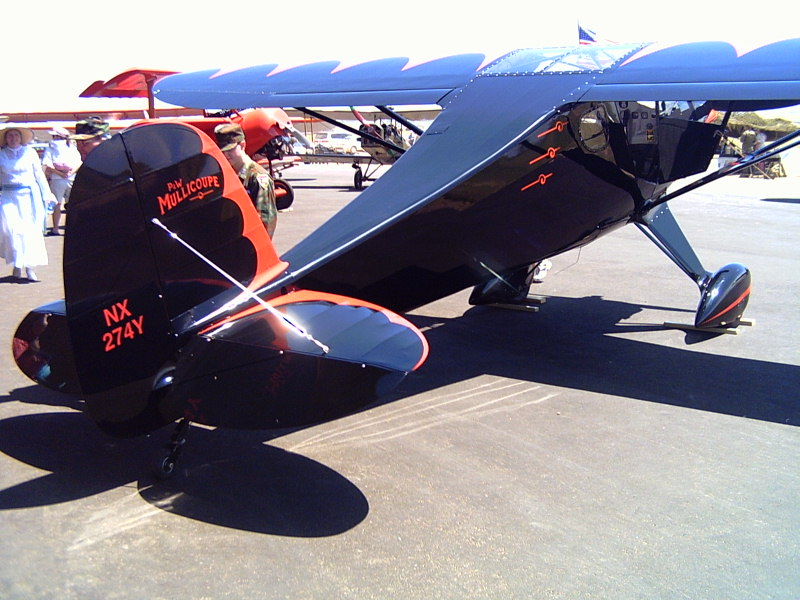
Mullicoupe tail view at Vintage Aero Flying Museum, March 2007.

General characteristics

- Crew: 2
- Wingspan: 29 ft 3 in (8.92 m)
- Airfoil: NACA 23012
- Fuel capacity: 150 150 US gal (568 L)
- Powerplant: 1 × Pratt & Whitney R-985 9-cyl. air-cooled radial piston engine, 450 hp (340 kW)
- Propellers: 2-bladed Hamilton Standard 2D30, 8 ft 6 in (2.59 m) diameter with -6167 blade aerofoil.

Performance

- Cruise speed: 225 mph (362 km/h, 196 kn) at 14,000 ft (4,267 m)
- Endurance: 7 hours
- Wing loading: 27 lb/sq ft (130 kg/m^{2})

== See also ==
- Monocoupe 90

Related development

- Howard DGA-6 (Mister Mulligan)
