= Ensign Eliminator =

Ensign Eliminator is a nickname which has been given to multiple aircraft. It may refer to:

- Howard DGA-15, introduced in 1939
- Vought F4U Corsair, introduced in 1942
- Vought F-8 Crusader, introduced in 1957
