= Howard DGA-15 =

1939 general aviation aircraft by Howard Aircraft

DGA-15
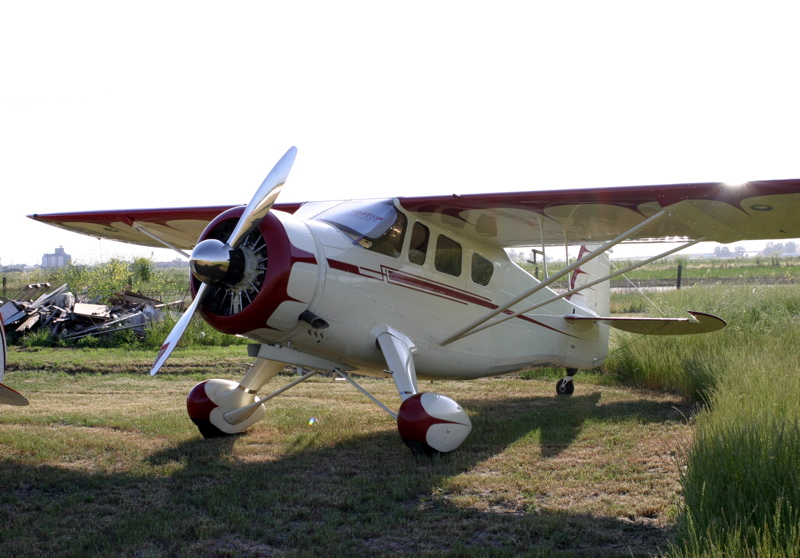

General information
- Type: Civil transport
- Manufacturer: Howard Aircraft Corporation
- Designer: Benny Howard
- Primary user: US Navy
- Number built: 520

History
- Manufactured: 1939-1944
- Introduction date: 1939
- Developed from: Howard DGA-12

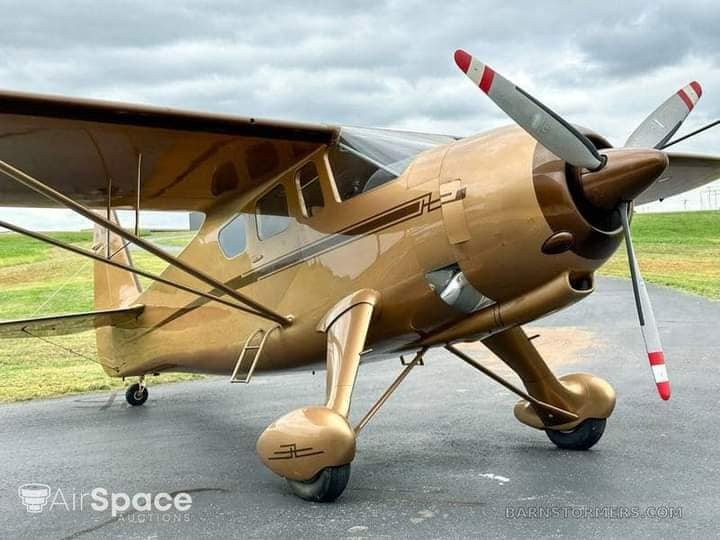
A highly-modified, experimental DGA-15 equipped with an Alvis Leonides engine

The Howard DGA-15 is a single-engine civil aircraft produced in the United States by the Howard Aircraft Corporation from 1939 to 1944. After the United States' entry into World War II, it was built in large numbers for the United States Navy and also served various roles in the United States Army Air Forces.

== Design and development ==
The Howard Aircraft Company (later Howard Aircraft Corporation) was formed in 1936 to build commercial derivatives of the Howard DGA-6 (named Mister Mulligan), a successful four-seat racing aircraft which had won both the Bendix and the Thompson Trophies in 1935, the only aircraft ever to win both races. These successes did indeed bring the DGA series much attention, and Howard produced a series of closely related models differing mainly in the engine type, consisting of the DGA-7, -8, -9, -11 and -12. Offering high performance and being comprehensively equipped, despite a high purchase price (with the DGA-11 selling for $17,865), these became coveted aircraft owned by corporations, wealthy individuals, and movie stars, such as Wallace Beery, who was himself a pilot. (In the movie Bugsy, Warren Beatty, playing the title role, is flown from Los Angeles to Las Vegas in a red Howard DGA-15.)

In 1939, the Howard Aircraft Corporation produced a new development of the basic design, the DGA-15. Like its predecessors, the DGA-15 was a single-engined high-winged monoplane with a wooden wing and a steel-tube-truss fuselage, but it was distinguished by a deeper and wider fuselage, allowing five people to be seated in comfort. It was available in several versions, differing in the engine fitted. The DGA-15P was powered by a Pratt & Whitney Wasp Junior radial engine, while the DGA-15J used a Jacobs L6MB and the DGA-15W a Wright R-760-E2 Whirlwind. In an era when airlines were flying Douglas DC-3s, the Howards cruising at 160 to 170 mph could match their speed, range and comfort with the rear seat leg room exceeding airline standards with limousine-like capaciousness, and high wing loading allowing the Howards to ride through most turbulence comfortably.

=== World War II ===
Prior to the attack on Pearl Harbor in December 1941, about 80 DGA-8 through -15 aircraft had been built at the Howard Aircraft Corporation factory on the south side of Chicago Municipal Airport. With America's entry into World War II, most of the civilian Howards were commandeered by the military. The Army used them as officer transports and as air ambulances, with the designation UC-70. The Navy, in particular, much liked the aircraft and contracted Howard Aircraft Corporation to build hundreds of DGA-15Ps to its own specifications. They were used variously under several designations as an officers' utility transport (GH-1, GH-3), aerial ambulance (GH-2), and for instrument training (NH-1). A second factory was opened at Dupage County airport, west of Chicago, and about 520 DGA-15s were eventually completed.

=== Vintage years ===
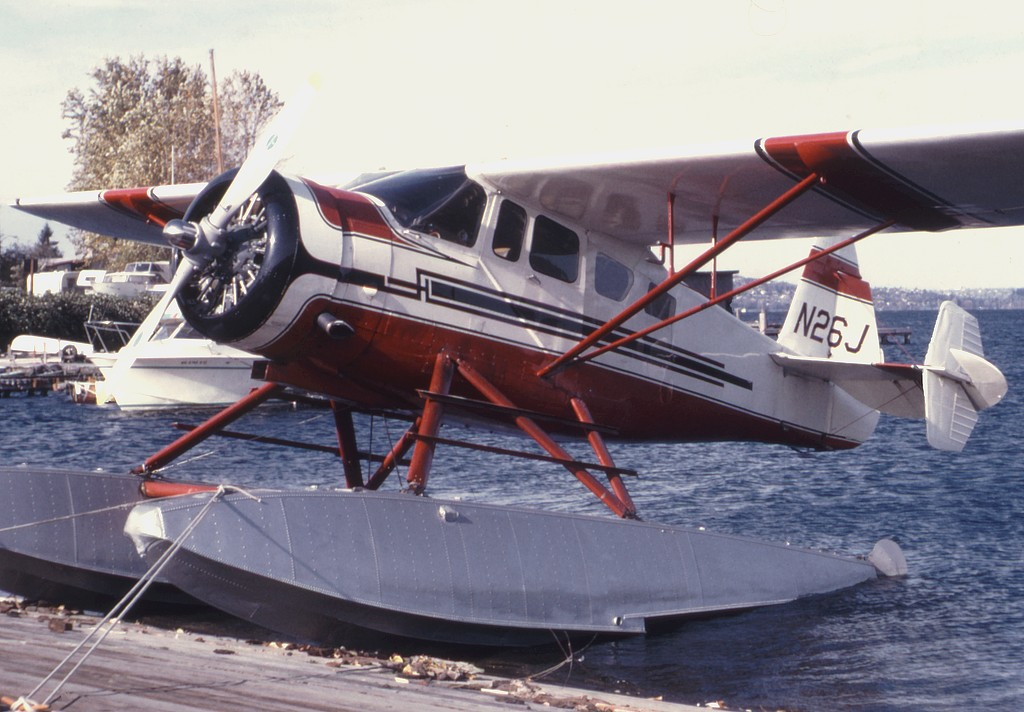
DGA-15P modified by the Jobmaster Company; floats and horizontal stabilizer finlets added for improved control – Renton, Seattle, October 1973

In their vintage years, Howards DGA series are prized more for their utility than for their clean lines. Contemporary cabin aircraft have already become antiques, living pampered lives as show pieces rather than working aircraft. In the 1960s a modification was offered by the Jobmaster company of Renton, Washington, including additional seating, windows, and float installation making Howard DGA-15s attractive to bush operators, and the large cabin proved popular with sky-divers as low-capital-outlay, low-operating-cost jumping platforms.

With most of the working Howard DGAs retired from active commercial service, they have become popular as restoration subjects and as alternatives to more modern equivalents with higher cost of ownership. Almost 100 of the Howard variants are still flying, mostly DGA-15s. A few of the DGA-11s also still fly, including one out of Santa Paula, California, which is probably the world headquarters for Howards, with at least five flying out of that field.

Superb travelling airplanes with much better visibility, headroom, and shoulder room than some contemporary cabin aircraft, they have very long "legs" with a fuel capacity of 151 gallons in 3 belly-mounted tanks, giving an endurance of more than 7 hours, for a range, at normal cruise (130 kn, 150 mph), of over 1,000 statute miles. With modern avionics, the Howard can compete in many respects with many contemporary light aircraft, due to its combination of room, comfort, speed, range and carrying capacity. A DGA-15P competed in the 1971 London (England) to Victoria (British Columbia, Canada) air race.

== Variants ==
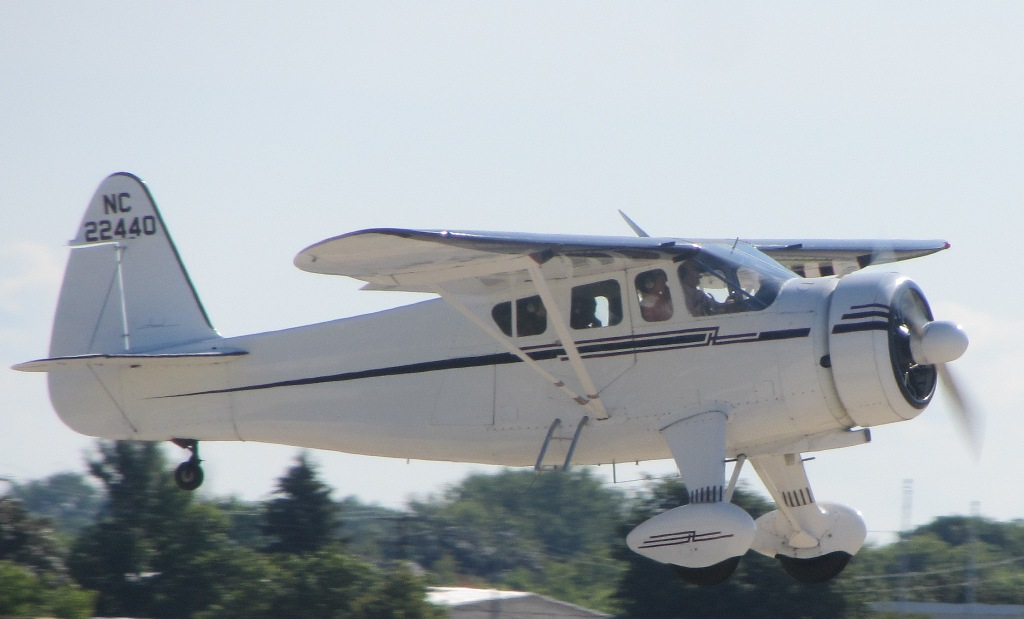
Howard DGA-15P

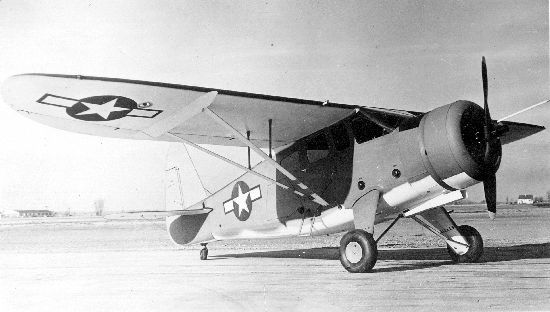
A GH-2 Nightingale

DGA-15J
Variant fitted with a Jacobs L6MB radial engine (330 hp, 246 kW)
DGA-15P
Variant fitted with a Pratt & Whitney R-985 radial engine (450 hp, 336 kW)
DGA-15W
Variant fitted with a Wright Whirlwind J6-7 radial engine (350 hp, 261 kW)

=== Military designations ===
GH-1
Communications and liaison version of the DGA-15P built for the United States Navy and United States Coast Guard, 29 built new and four civil aircraft impressed.
GH-2 Nightingale
Ambulance version for the US Navy, 131 built.
GH-3
A variant of the GH-1 with equipment changes, 115 built.

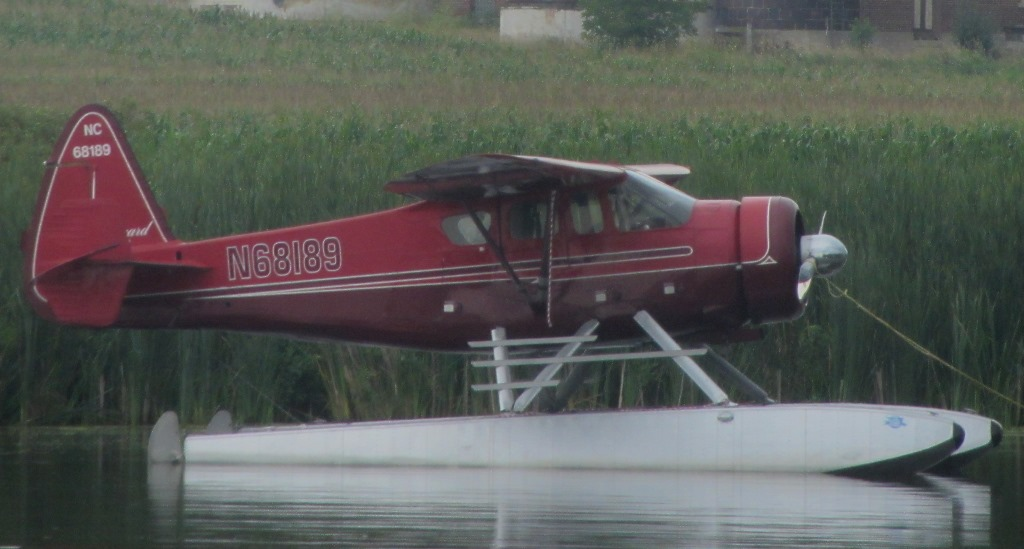
Howard NH-1 modified to civilian DGA-15P standards and equipped with Jobmaster float conversion

NH-1
Instrument training variant for the United States Navy, 205 built.
UC-70
Ten civil DGA-15Ps impressed into service by the United States Army Air Forces and one aircraft leased.
UC-70B
Four civil DGA-15Js impressed into service by the United States Army Air Forces.

== Specifications (DGA-15P) ==
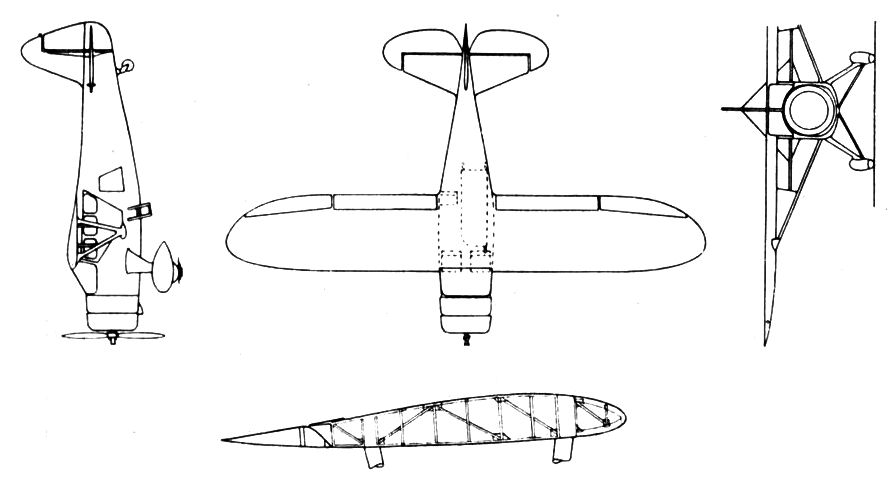
Howard DGA-15 3-view

Data from Howard Aircraft Foundation

General characteristics

- Crew: one, pilot
- Capacity: 4 passengers
- Length: 25 ft 0 in (7.62 m)
- Wingspan: 38 ft 0 in (11.58 m)
- Height: 8 ft 5 in (2.57 m)
- Wing area: 210 sq ft (19.5 m^{2}) (Note: the wing span and chord are the same as the earlier DGA-11, but the DGA-15 area is calculated including the area displaced by the fuselage cabin)
- Airfoil: NACA 2R212 (reflexed)
- Empty weight: 2,705 lb (1,227 kg)
- Gross weight: 4,350 lb (1,973 kg) useful load 1645 lb (746 kg)
- Max takeoff weight: 4,350 lb (1,973 kg)
- Powerplant: 1 × Pratt & Whitney R-985SB Wasp Jr. radial engine, 450 hp (336 kW)

Performance

- Maximum speed: 175 kn (201 mph, 323 km/h)
- Never exceed speed: 235 kn (270 mph, 437 km/h)
- Range: 800 nmi (920 mi, 1,480 km)
- Service ceiling: 21,500 ft (6,553 m)
- Rate of climb: 1,560 ft/min (7.9 m/s)

== See also ==
Aircraft of comparable role, configuration, and era

- Beech 17 Staggerwing
- Cessna Airmaster
- de Havilland Canada DHC-2 Beaver
- Fairchild 24
- Fairchild Model 45
- Noorduyn Norseman
- Spartan Executive
- Stinson Reliant
- Waco SRE Aristocrat

Related lists

- List of aircraft of World War II
