= Fayetteville Fire Department Fire Station 3 =

- Fayetteville Fire Department Fire Station #3
- U.S. National Register of Historic Places
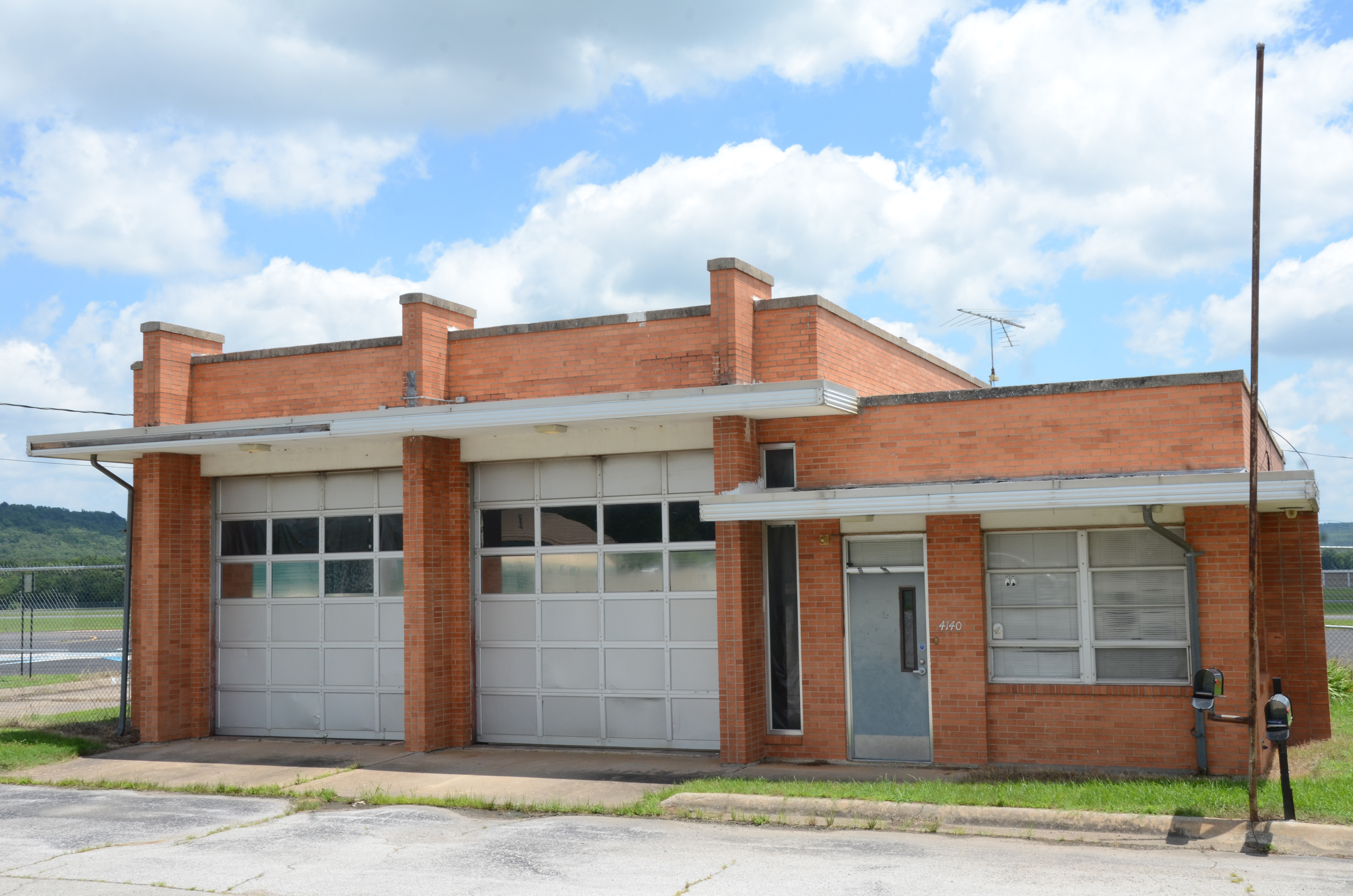

- Location within Arkansas Location within the United States
- Location: 4140 S. School St., Fayetteville, Arkansas
- Coordinates: 36°0′35″N 94°10′23″W
- Area: less than one acre
- Built: 1963
- Architect: T. Ewing Shelton
- NRHP reference No.: 15000290
- Added to NRHP: June 2, 2015

The Fayetteville Fire Department Fire Station 3 is a historic fire station at 4140 South School Street (United States Route 71) in Fayetteville, Arkansas. It is a single story masonry structure, built out of brick in 1963 to a design by local architect T. Ewing Shelton, and is located near the northwest corner of the Drake Field airport. It has two equipment bays on the left, articulated by projecting piers which have narrow windows on the outside. To the right is a lower section, housing a pedestrian entrance and a pair of sash windows. The station is significant as a high-quality local example of Mid-Century Modern design, and for its exemplification of the community's growth in the mid-20th century.

The building was listed on the National Register of Historic Places in 2015.

== See also ==
- Fayetteville Fire Department Fire Station 1
- National Register of Historic Places listings in Washington County, Arkansas
