= Port Townsend Aero Museum =

- Location within Washington (state)
- Established: 2001
- Location: Port Townsend, Washington
- Coordinates: 48°03′24″N 122°48′28″W
- Type: Aviation museum
- Founders: Jerry Thoutte; Peggy Thoutte
- Director: Michael Payne
- Website: ptaeromuseum.com

Port Townsend Aero Museum is an aviation museum located at Jefferson County International Airport in Port Townsend, Washington.

== History ==
The museum was founded in 2001 by Jerry and Peggy Thoutte with six flyable aircraft. The museum was initially located in a number of hangars at the airport, but moved into a new building in 2008. The Thouttes retired from daily operations in 2016 and Michael Payne took over as director. The museum acquired eight aircraft from the North Cascades Vintage Aircraft Museum when the latter closed in 2018.

On April 28, 2019, a PT-17 Stearman biplane that belonged to the museum made an emergency landing on a beach at Discovery Bay, Washington after an in-flight engine failure. The forced landing onto the narrow sloping beach resulted in significant damage to the airframe, but caused only minor injuries for the pilot and passenger.

Construction on a 6,000 sq ft (560 m^{2}) expansion of the museum was in progress in 2022.

== Aircraft on display ==
- Aeronca C-3B Master
- Aeronca 7AC Champion
- Aeronca L-3
- Beechcraft C17B Staggerwing
- Boeing P-12C – Replica
- Bowlus BA-100 Baby Albatross
- CallAir A-2
- Cessna 140
- Corben Baby Ace
- Curtiss-Wright Junior
- de Havilland Canada DHC-1 Chipmunk
- Dormoy Bathtub
- Fairchild 22 C7B
- Fairchild 24W40
- Fairchild M62 – Painted as a PT-19B
- Howard DGA-4 – Replica
- Laister-Kauffman LK-10A
- Mooney M-18LA Mite
- Pietenpol Sky Scout
- Piper J3C-65 Cub
- Rose Parrakeet
- Schleicher Ka 6E
- Stinson SM-8A Junior
- Taylorcraft B
- Taylorcraft BC-12-D
- Travel Air 2000
