= Fayetteville Fire Department Fire Station 1 =

- Fayetteville Fire Department Fire Station #1
- U.S. National Register of Historic Places
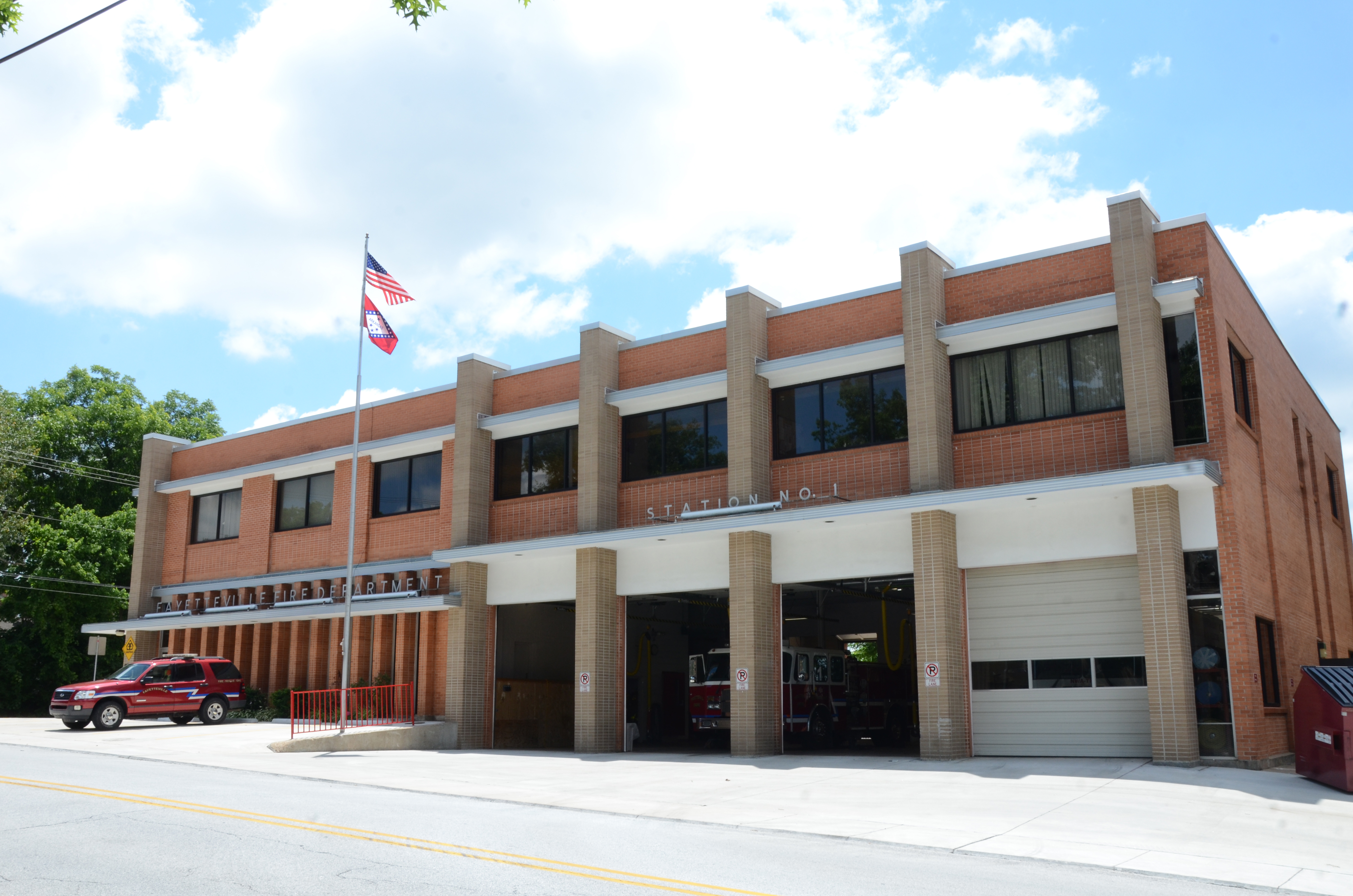

- Location within Arkansas Location within the United States
- Location: 303 W. Center St., Fayetteville, Arkansas
- Coordinates: 36°3′45″N 94°9′48″W
- Area: less than one acre
- Built: 1963
- Architect: T. Ewing Shelton
- NRHP reference No.: 15000289
- Added to NRHP: June 2, 2015

The Fayetteville Central Fire Station is a historic fire station at 303 West Center Street in Fayetteville, Arkansas. It is a two-story masonry structure, built out of brick in 1963 to a design by local architect T. Ewing Shelton. Its front facade is divided into seven sections by protruding brick piers of contrasting color, the outermost bays being very narrow. The right four main bays are occupied by equipment bays on the ground floor, and the bay to their left is large, with further subdivision into three on the second floor and fifteen narrow bays on the first. The station is significant as a high-quality local example of Mid-Century Modern design, and for its exemplification of the community's growth in the mid-20th century.

The building was listed on the National Register of Historic Places in 2015.

== See also ==
- Fayetteville Fire Department Fire Station 3
- National Register of Historic Places listings in Washington County, Arkansas
