= Howard DGA-18 =

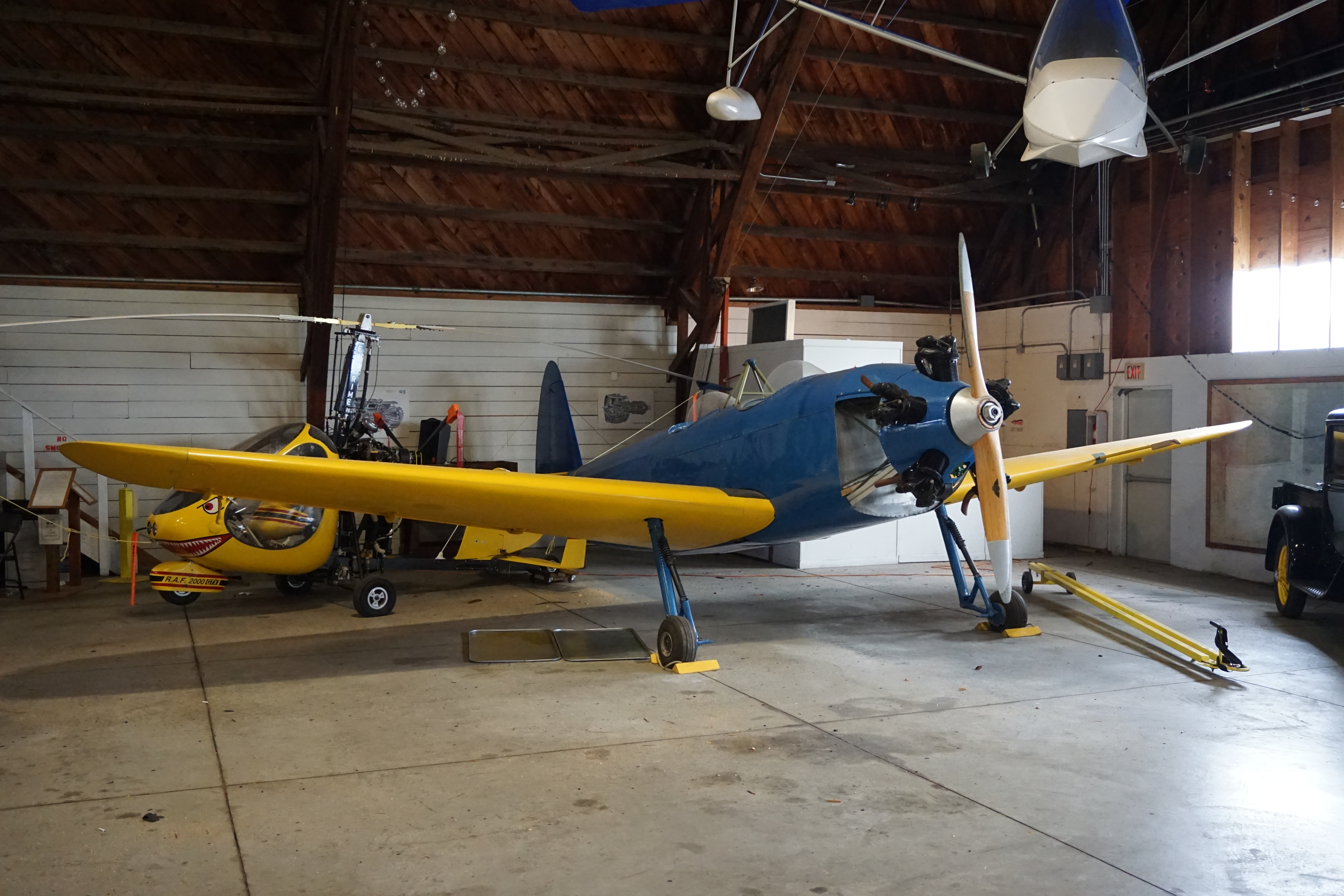
- 1941 Howard DGA-18K at the Arkansas Air & Military Museum in Fayetteville, Arkansas

General information
- Type: Civil monoplane trainer
- National origin: United States
- Manufacturer: Howard Aircraft Corporation
- Primary user: US Civil Pilot Training Program
- Number built: ~60

History
- First flight: 1941

The Howard DGA-18 was an American two-seat basic training aircraft designed and built by the Howard Aircraft Corporation for the United States Civil Pilot Training Program.

== Design ==
The United States' Civilian Pilot Training Program resulted in high demand for both primary and advanced training aircraft, and in an attempt to take advantage of this demand, the DGA-18 was designed, with the first example flying in October 1940. The DGA-18 was a low-wing cantilever monoplane with two tandem open cockpits and a fixed conventional landing gear. The aircraft was built in three variants with different engines fitted.

== Variants ==
DGA-18 (or DGA-125)
Variant powered by a 125 hp (93 kW) Warner Scarab 50 radial engine.
DGA-18K (or DGA-160)
Variant powered by a 160 hp (119 kW) Kinner R-5 radial engine.
DGA-18W (or DGA-145)
Variant powered by a 145 hp (108 kW) Warner Super Scarab radial engine.

== Survivors ==
One DGA-18K (DGA-160), c/n 668, registration N39668, is on display at the Arkansas Air and Military Museum, Fayetteville, Arkansas.

== Specifications (DGA-18) ==
Data from Some Damn Good Airplanes

General characteristics

- Crew: 2
- Length: 26 ft 6 in (8.08 m)
- Wingspan: 34 ft 0 in (10.36 m)
- Height: 7 ft 3 in (2.21 m)
- Wing area: 179.5 sq ft (16.68 m^{2})
- Airfoil: Munk M-6
- Empty weight: 1,350 lb (612 kg)
- Max takeoff weight: 1,950 lb (885 kg)
- Fuel capacity: 31 US Gal (117 L)
- Powerplant: 1 × Warner Scarab 50 7-cylinder air-cooled radial engine, 125 hp (93 kW)

Performance

- Maximum speed: 118 mph (190 km/h, 103 kn) at sea level
- Cruise speed: 108 mph (174 km/h, 94 kn)
- Stall speed: 50 mph (80 km/h, 43 kn)
- Range: 380 mi (610 km, 330 nmi)
- Endurance: 3.5 hr
- Service ceiling: 13,500 ft (4,100 m)
- Rate of climb: 800 ft/min (4.1 m/s)
