= Arkansas Air & Military Museum =

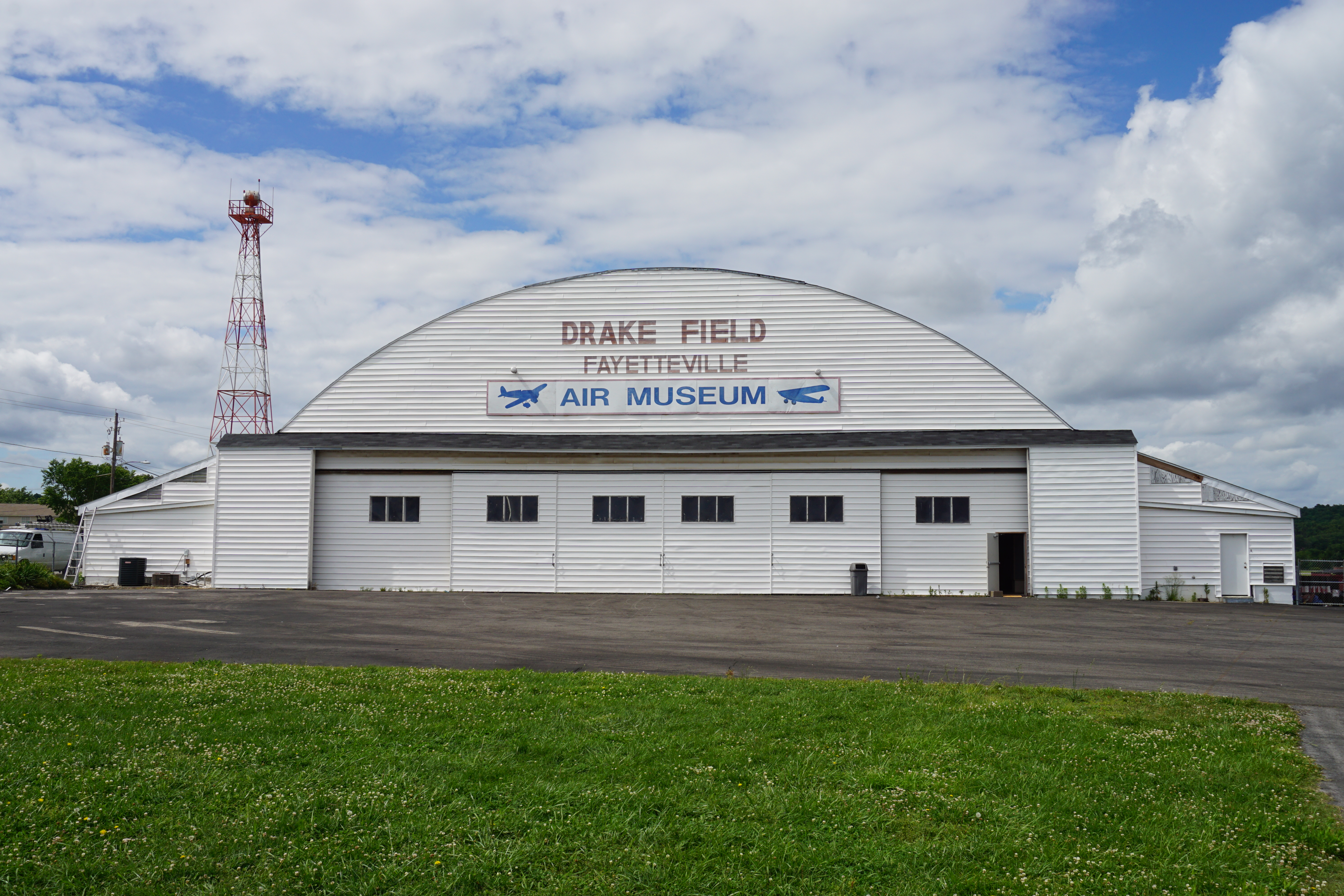
- Exterior of the Arkansas Air & Military Museum

- Location within Arkansas
- Established: 1986
- Location: Drake Field, Fayetteville, Arkansas
- Coordinates: 36.007136°N 94.172987°W
- Type: Aviation and military museum
- Visitors: 6,000 (2014)
- Website: www.arkansasairandmilitary.com

The Arkansas Air & Military Museum is an aviation and military museum located at Drake Field in Fayetteville, Arkansas. It is the largest aviation museum in Arkansas.

== History ==
The museum was originally established in 1986 as the Arkansas Air Museum. In 2012, it merged with the Ozark Military Museum housed next door into the Arkansas Air & Military Museum. In 2014, its board of directors noted that a decrease in visitors had resulted in the museum struggling to stay financially viable: that year, its monthly profits were roughly $5,000, compared to monthly expenses of around $7,000. Also in 2014, the museum only had one paid employee, with the remainder of its personnel consisting entirely of volunteers. According to board member Russell Smith, the museum's number of annual visitors shrunk from approximately 26,000 to 6,000 after the opening of Interstate 540 and Northwest Arkansas Regional Airport replaced Drake Field as the region's principal airport in 1998.

The museum announced a new director in August 2020.

== Facility ==
The wooden hangar in which the Arkansas Air & Military Museum is housed is one of the few surviving such buildings from the 1940s and is listed on the Arkansas Register of Historic Places; it previously served as the headquarters for a military aviation training post during World War II. The museum rents the facility as an event venue as well as displaying a variety of its aircraft there. A second hangar houses the balance of the aircraft and vehicle collection with a third smaller building housing military aircraft, small arms, and other memorabilia.

== Collection ==
The Arkansas Air & Military Museum's collection of aircraft ranges from the 1920s to the modern era, including many Golden Age racing aircraft, as well as military aircraft dating from World War I, World War II, and the Vietnam War.

Featured aircraft in the collection include.:

- Bell AH-1S Cobra US Army attack helicopter
- Bell UH-1H Huey US Army utility helicopter
- Boeing-Stearman NS2S, a Naval version of the PT-17 military trainer
- Curtiss-Wright CW-1 Junior
- Dassault Falcon 20 executive jet
- Douglas A-4 Skyhawk US Navy attack aircraft
- Ercoupe 415C once owned by Walmart founder Sam Walton as his first aircraft.
- Howard DGA-11 Golden Age general aviation aircraft
- Howard DGA-18K open cockpit trainer
- Learjet 23 executive jet once the world's only aerobatic Lear Jet flown by Bobby Younkin
- Lockheed C-130 Hercules formerly operated by the commander of the Arkansas Air National Guard
- LTV A-7 Corsair II US Navy attack aircraft
- North American T-2 Buckeye US Navy training aircraft
- North American SNJ Texan US Navy training aircraft
- Piasecki H-21C Shawnee US Army cargo helicopter also known as the "Workhorse" and nicknamed "The Flying Banana"
- Piper J-3 Cub general aviation training aircraft
- Piper Tri-Pacer general aviation aircraft
- Stinson Junior Golden Age general aviation aircraft
- Stinson L-13 Grasshopper, a rare liaison aircraft designed by Stinson Aircraft Company and mass-produced by Consolidated Aircraft
- Travel Air Model R "Mystery Ship" replica

In addition to aircraft, the museum also displays a variety of aviation engines, including a Curtiss OX-5, a Rolls-Royce Spey, and a Westinghouse J34. Other collections and exhibits include a 1940 Packard automobile, military vehicles (including ambulances, jeeps, trucks, and a British Ferret armored car), and smaller military artifacts (such as uniforms, helmets, and even pieces of a Mitsubishi A6M Zero).

Additionally, the museum features biographical exhibits on notable Arkansan aviators, including Commander Richard O. Covey, Field Eugene Kindley, Captain Pierce McKennon, and pioneering female pilot Louise Thaden, who won the Women's Air Derby in 1929 and the Harmon Trophy in 1936.

== Gallery ==
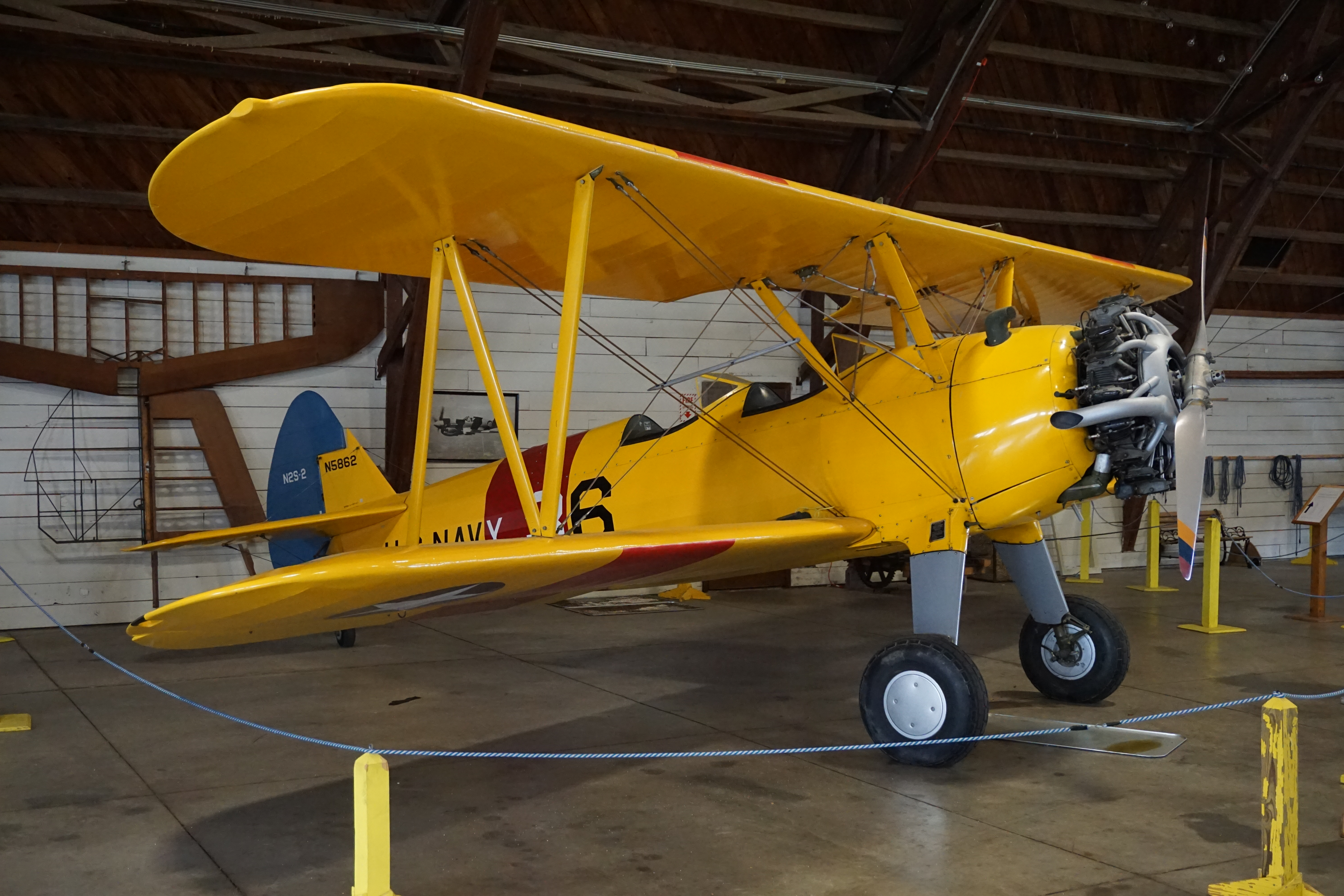
Boeing-Stearman NS2S

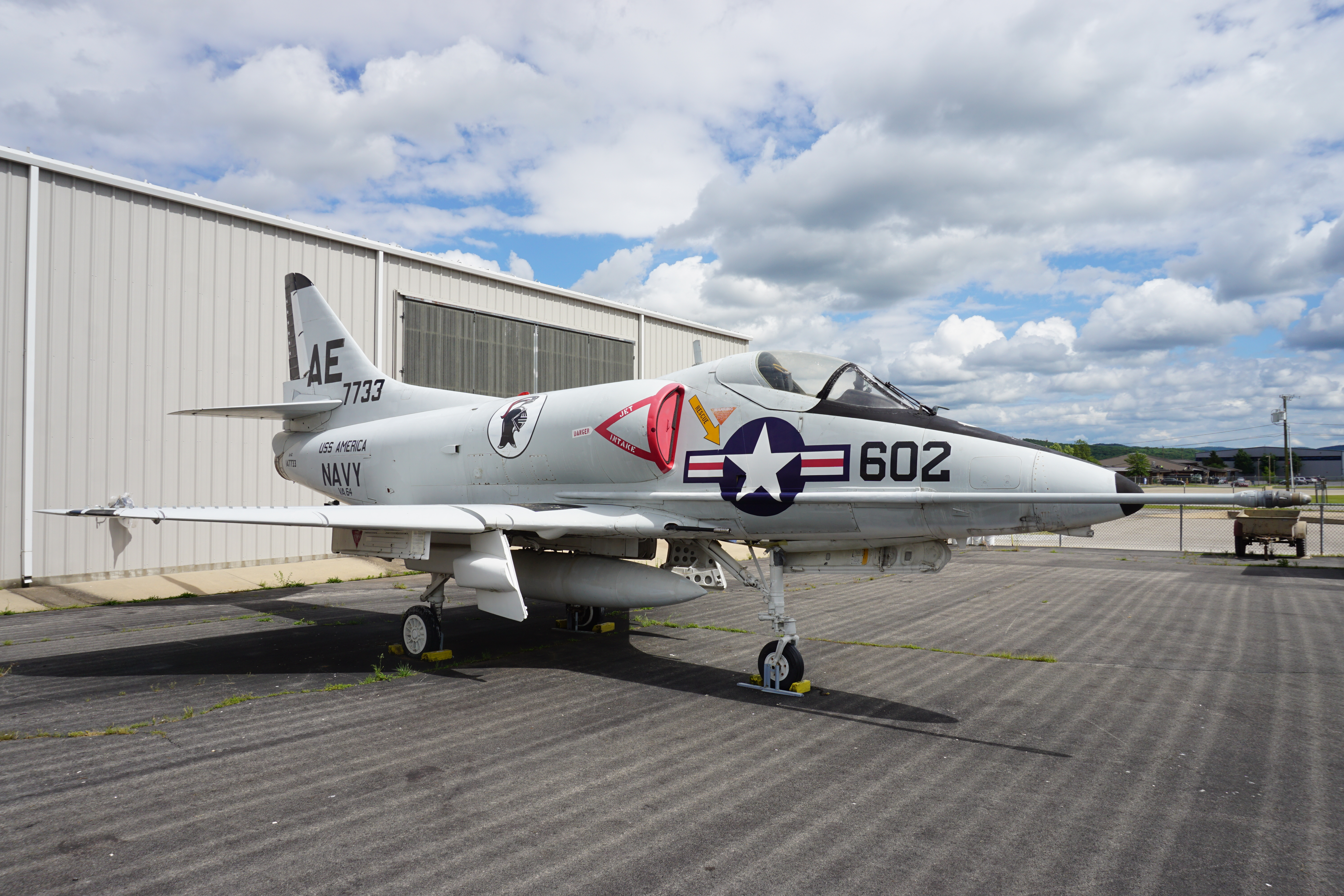
Douglas A-4 Skyhawk

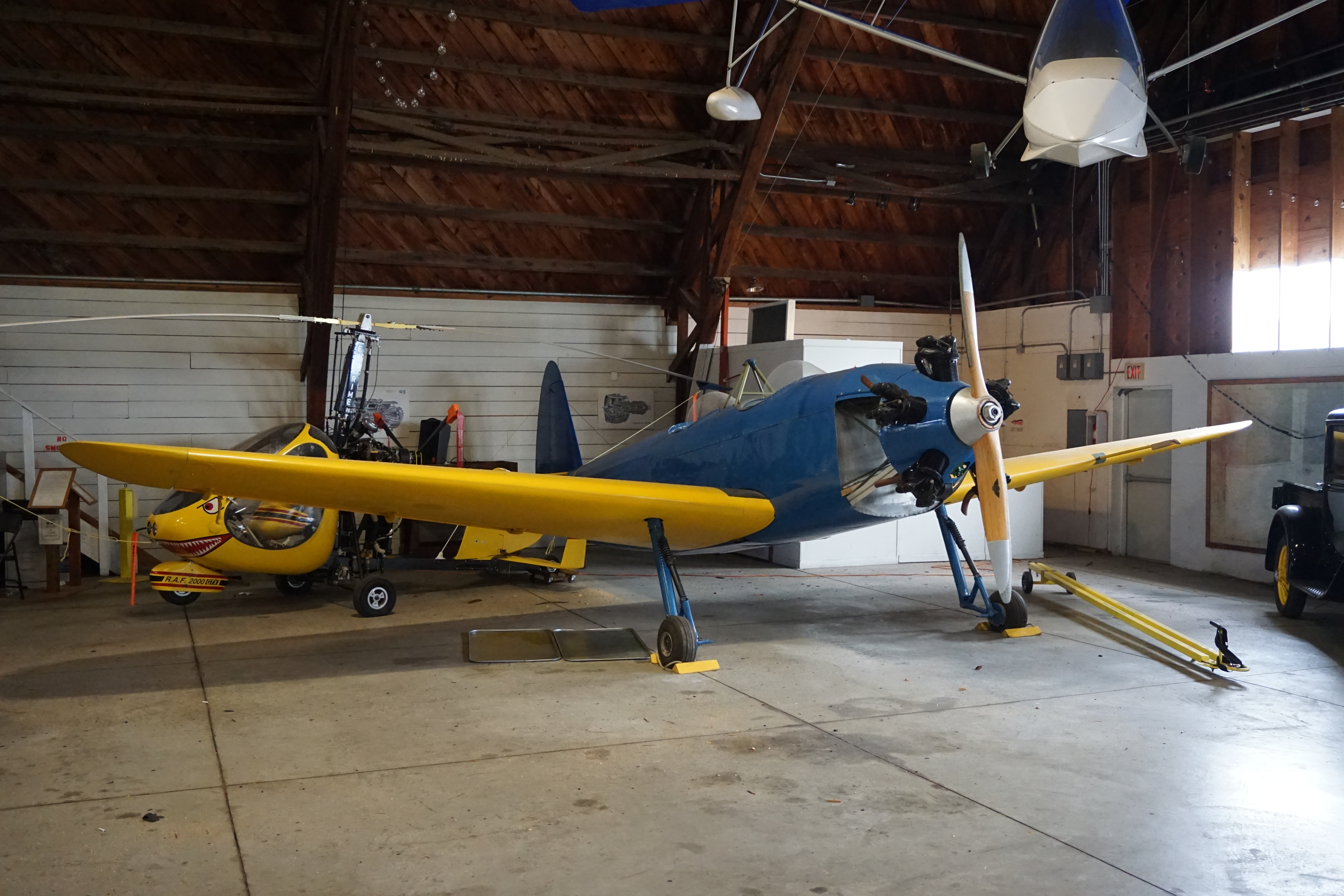
Howard DGA-18K

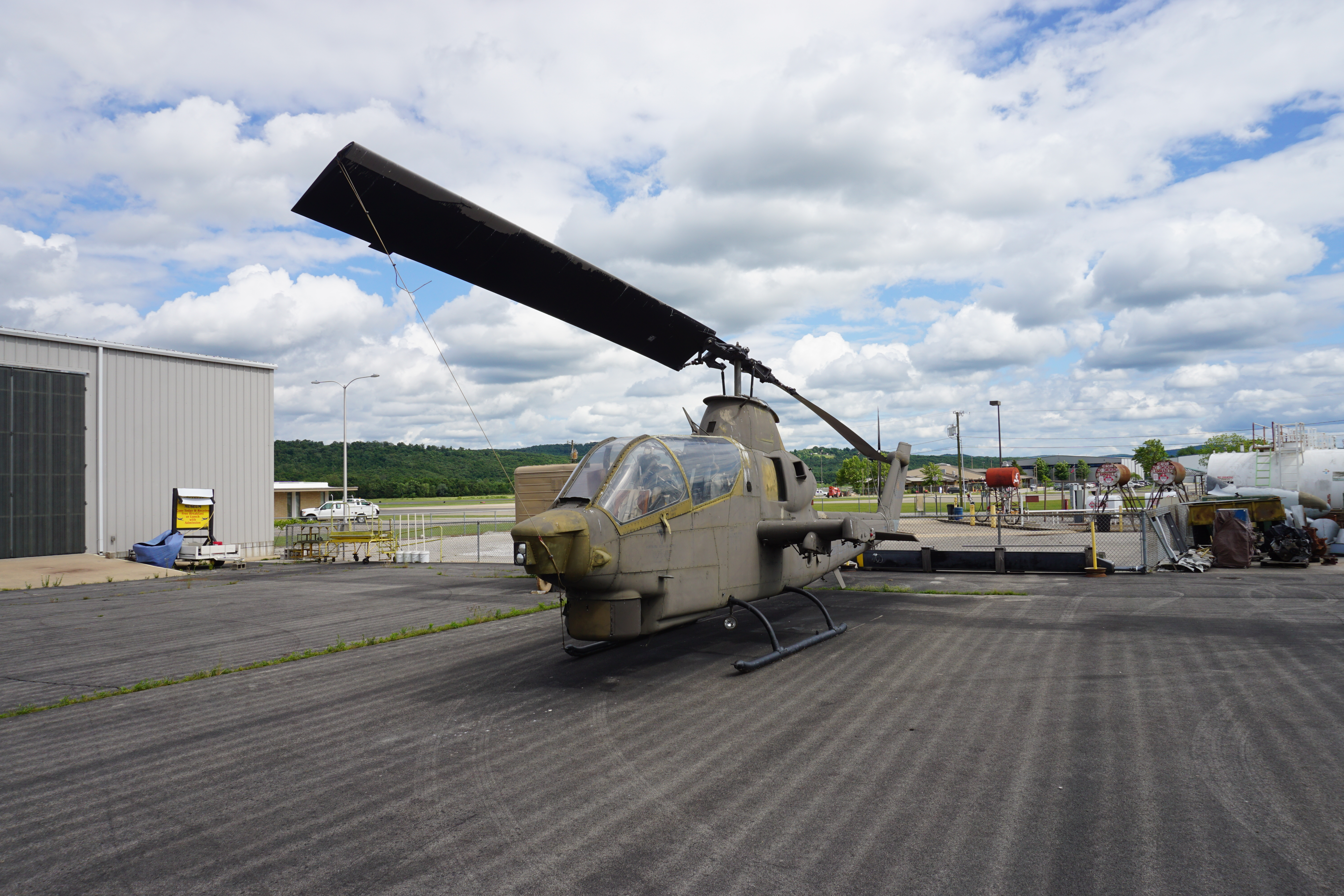
Bell AH-1S Cobra

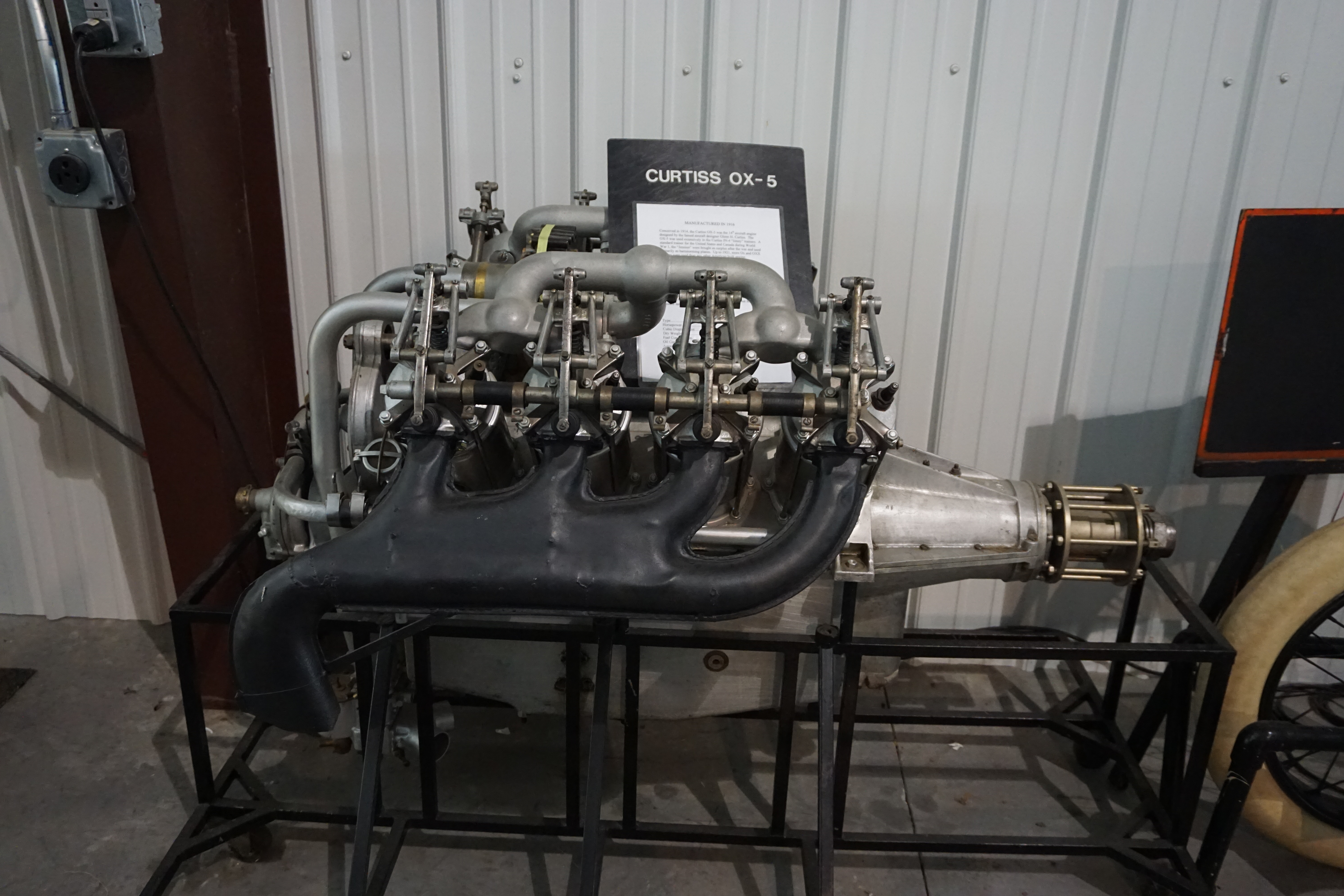
Curtiss OX-5 engine

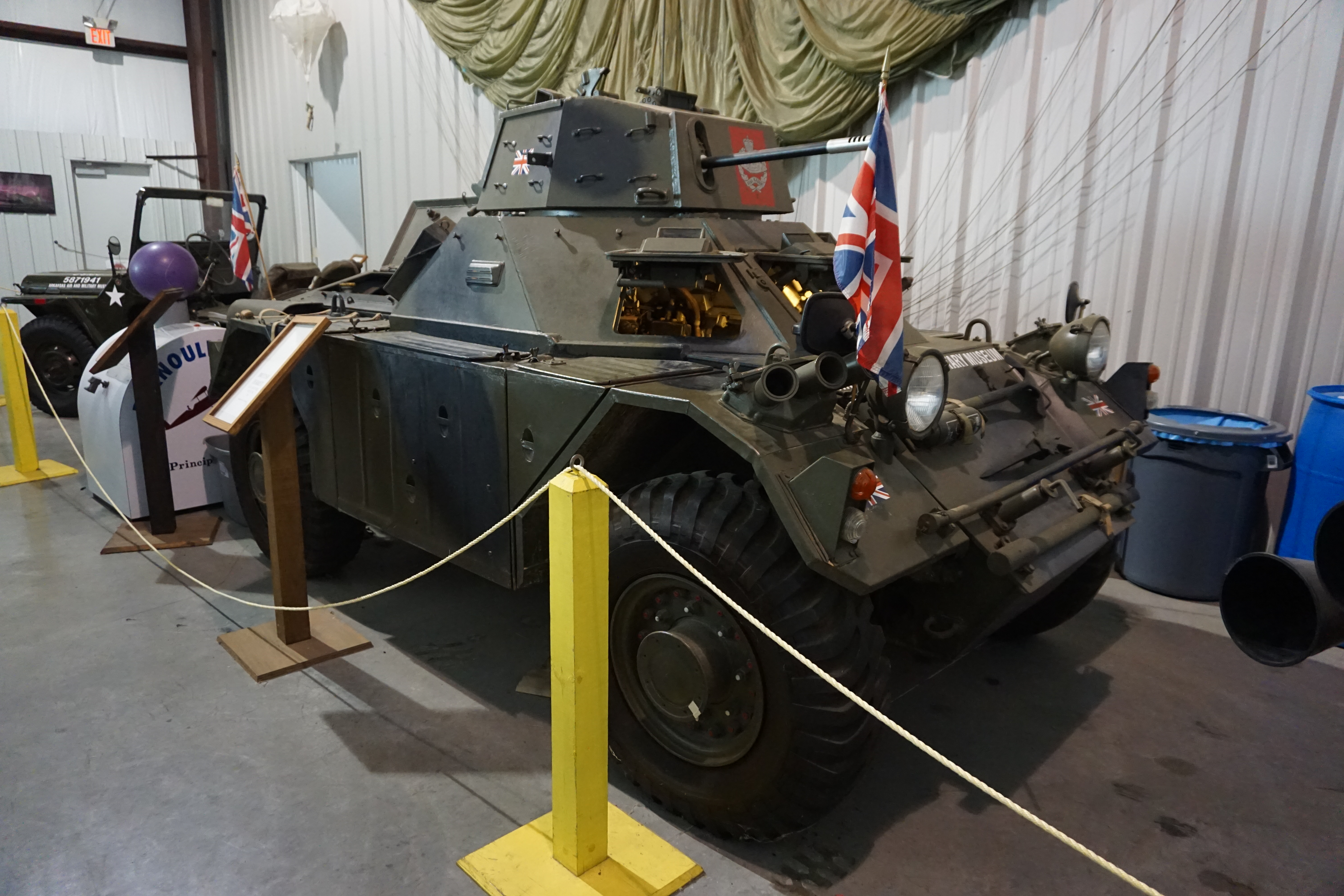
Ferret armored car
