= Howard DGA-8 =

1936 American monoplane family

DGA-8, DGA-9, DGA-11, and DGA-12
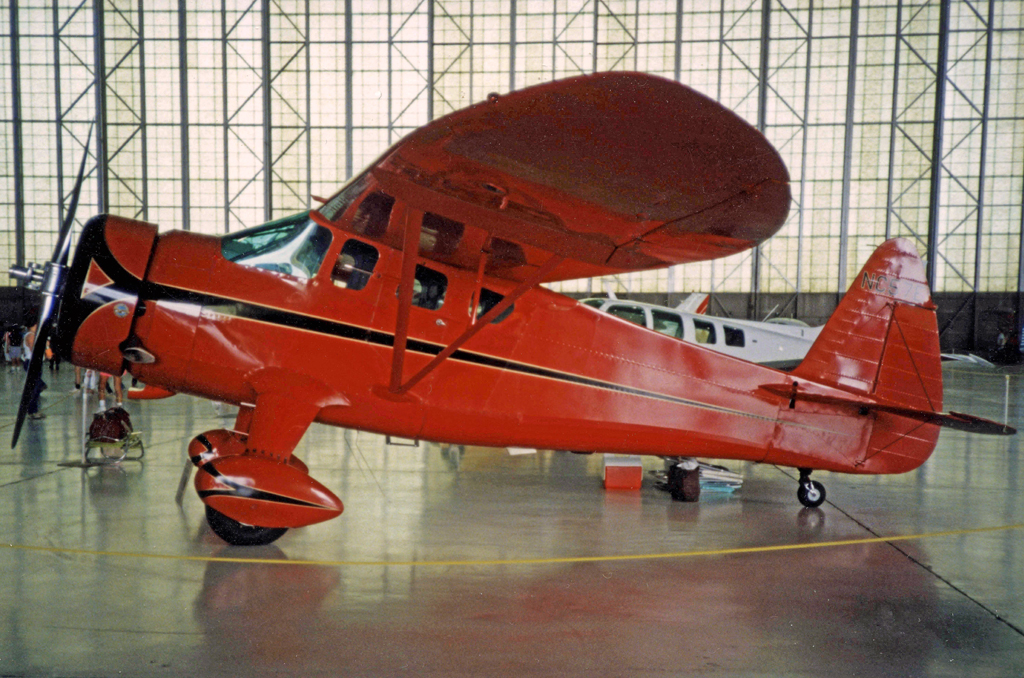
- Airworthy Howard DGA-11 exhibited in 1990

General information
- Type: Utility aircraft
- National origin: United States
- Manufacturer: Howard
- Designer: Benny Howard
- Status: Still in service
- Primary user: Private pilot owners
- Number built: 31

History
- First flight: 1936
- Variant: Howard DGA-15

The Howard DGA-8, DGA-9, DGA-11, and DGA-12 were a family of four-place, single-engine, high-wing light monoplanes built by the Howard Aircraft Corporation, Chicago, Illinois from 1936.

== Development ==
The various models were distinguished by different engine choices and detail changes, and were built and sold in parallel to each other. A number of examples were built as one type and converted to another during their lifetimes. The DGA-11, powered by a nine-cylinder 450 horsepower (340 kW) Pratt & Whitney Wasp Junior radial engine, was purportedly the fastest four-seat civil aircraft of the late 1930s, able to achieve a top speed of about 200 miles per hour (320 km/h). A favorite of the high society and Hollywood circles, the DGA-11 cost about $16,500 in 1938. These aircraft were a direct developments of the famous Howard racing plane Mister Mulligan. Designer/pilot Ben Howard's "DGA" prefix stood for "Damned Good Airplane".

== History ==
The DGA-6's racing success brought the DGA series much attention, and in its various permutations, differentiated mainly by different powerplants, the DGAs -8, -9, -11, -12 (and later DGA-15) emerged as coveted aircraft, owned by corporations, wealthy individuals, and movie stars, such as Wallace Beery, who was himself a pilot. Spanish conductor and pianist Jose Iturbi owned and flew a DGA-11 "El Turia" (NC22402). In an era when airlines were flying DC-3s, the Howards at 160 to 170 mph (270 km/h) could match their speed and range. The rear seat exceeded airline leg room with limousine-like spaciousness. With its high wing loading, the Howards rode through most turbulence with airline-like solidity. The -11 was probably the ultimate of the series. Configured as a four-place aircraft with the 450 hp (340 kW) Pratt & Whitney R-985.

With America's entry into World War II, most of the civilian Howards were commandeered by the military. The Army used them as officer transports and as ambulance planes. They were used variously as an officer's utility transport and for instrument training. The Howard was and is an excellent instrument platform, very stable and solid, especially compared to modern light aircraft.

A number of these aircraft still fly, and another example of a DGA-11, restored by Jim Younkin, can be seen in the Arkansas Air & Military Museum.

== Variants ==
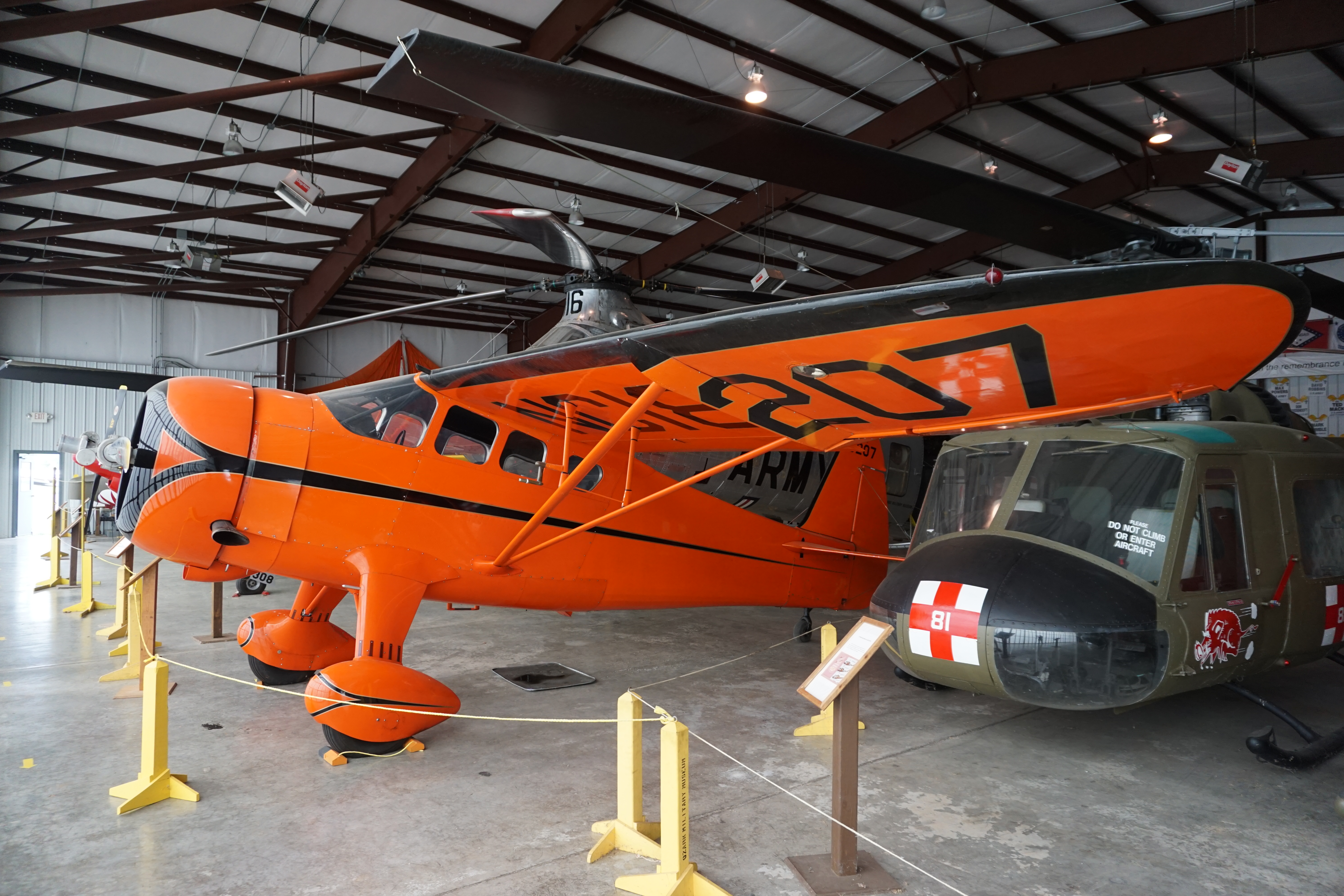
Howard DGA-9 / DGA-11 at the Arkansas Air & Military Museum in Fayetteville, Arkansas

- DGA-8 - version with Wright R-760 engine (18 built, 1 impressed by USAAF as UC-70C)
- DGA-9 - version with Jacobs L-5 engine (7 built, 2 impressed by USAAF as UC-70D)
- DGA-11 - version with Pratt & Whitney Wasp Junior engine (4 built; several more converted from DGA-8, -9 etc.)
- DGA-12 - version with Jacobs L-6 engine (2 built, both impressed by USAAF as UC-70A)
- UC-70 - DGA-8/ -9/ -12 and -15 aircraft impressed into service with the USAAC as utility transports.

== Specifications (DGA-11) ==
Data from {name of first source}

General characteristics

- Crew: one, pilot
- Capacity: 3 passengers
- Length: 25 ft 5 in (7.75 m)
- Wingspan: 38 ft 0 in (11.59 m)
- Height: 8 ft 5 in (2.57 m)
- Wing area: 185 sq ft (17.2 m^{2})
- Airfoil: NACA 2R212 (reflexed)
- Empty weight: 2,450 lb (1,111 kg)
- Gross weight: 4,100 lb (1,860 kg)
- Max takeoff weight: 4,100 lb (1,860 kg)
- Powerplant: 1 × Pratt & Whitney R-985 radial engine, 400-450 hp (299-336 kW)

Performance

- Maximum speed: 170 kn (196 mph, 315 km/h)
- Stall speed: 60 kn (69 mph, 111 km/h)
- Never exceed speed: 250 kn (288 mph, 463 km/h)
- Range: 869 nmi (1,000 mi, 1,609 km)
- Service ceiling: 26,000 ft (7,926 m)
- Wing loading: 22.2 lb/sq ft (108 kg/m^{2})
- Power/mass: 0.11 hp/lb

== See also ==
Aircraft of comparable role, configuration, and era

- Beechcraft Staggerwing
- Spartan Executive
- Stinson Reliant
- Waco SRE
