= Drake Field =

Drake Field Fayetteville Executive Airport
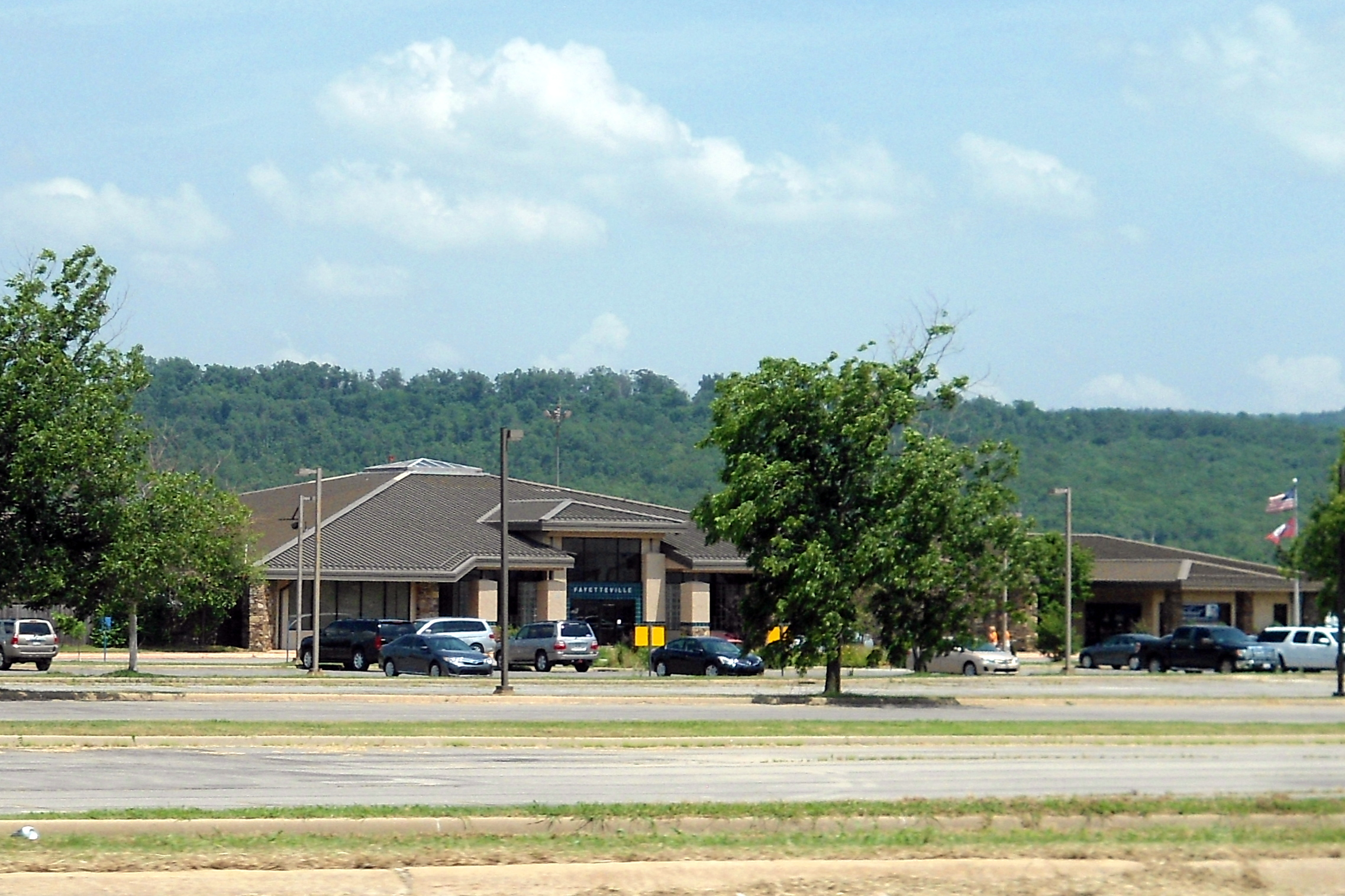
- IATA: FYV; ICAO: KFYV; FAA LID: FYV

Summary
- Airport type: Public
- Owner: City of Fayetteville
- Operator: City of Fayetteville
- Serves: Fayetteville, Arkansas
- Location: Greenland, Arkansas
- Elevation AMSL: 1,251 ft (381 m)
- Coordinates: 36°00′18″N 094°10′12″W

Map
- Location within Arkansas Location within the United States

Runways
Direction	Length		Surface
Direction	ft	m	Surface
16/34	6,005	1,830	Asphalt

Statistics (2020)
- Aircraft operations: 24,907
- Based aircraft: 96
- Source: Federal Aviation Administration

Drake Field (IATA: FYV, ICAO: KFYV, FAA LID: FYV) is a public airport three miles south of Fayetteville, in Washington County, Arkansas. It is also known as Fayetteville Executive Airport and was formerly Fayetteville Municipal Airport.

== Historical airline service ==
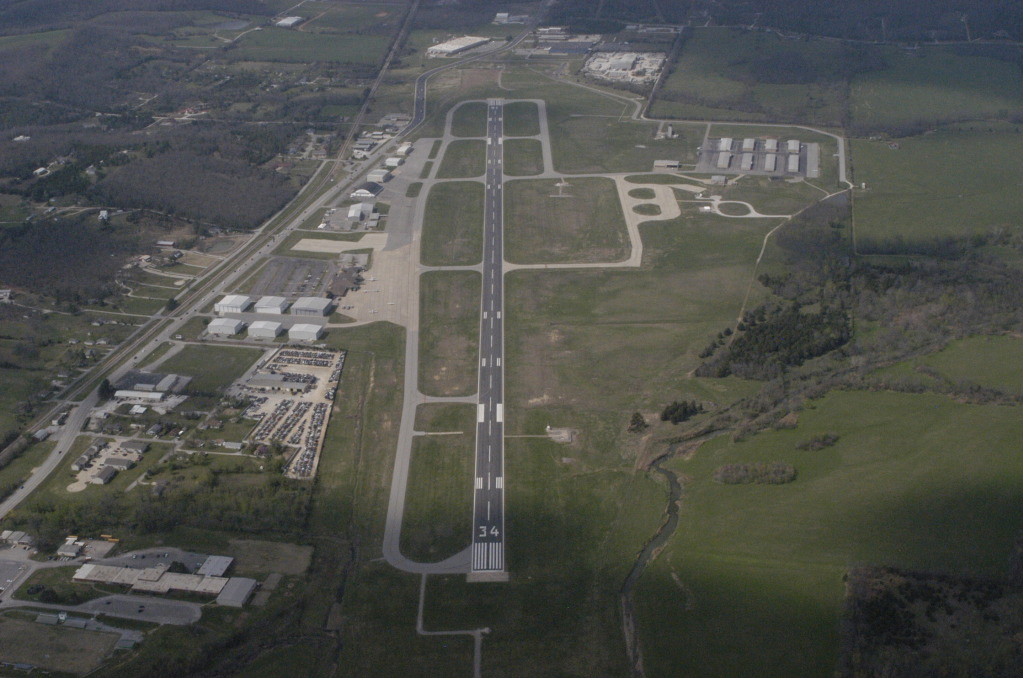
Aerial view

Drake Field was the commercial airport for northwest Arkansas until the opening of the Northwest Arkansas National Airport (XNA) in Highfill, Arkansas in 1998. It was served by Central Airlines with Douglas DC-3 prop aircraft and later with Convair 600 turboprops from 1955 until Central was acquired by the original Frontier Airlines in 1967.

Frontier continued serving Fayetteville through the 1970's with Convair 580 turboprops nonstop and direct to Dallas/Ft. Worth, nonstop to Harrison, AR, Hot Springs, AR and Joplin, MO, and direct to Kansas City, Little Rock, Memphis, St. Louis, Tulsa and Fort Leonard Wood, MO according to the March 2, 1977 Frontier Airlines system timetable. Frontier then ceased serving Fayetteville in 1982 at which time Metro Airlines began service to DFW with one stop at Fort Smith using former Frontier Convair 580's. Metro became an American Eagle affiliate for American Airlines in 1984.

Scheduled Skyways (which was also known as Skyways) was a commuter air carrier based in Fayetteville which was subsequently acquired and merged with Air Midwest in 1985. In 1974, the airline was operating nonstop flights from the airport to Little Rock and Tulsa. By early 1985 before the merger with Air Midwest, Skyways was operating nonstop service to the airport from Dallas/Fort Worth, St. Louis, Memphis, Little Rock, Tulsa, Springfield, MO, Joplin, MO, Fort Leonard Wood, MO, Hot Springs, AR, Jonesboro, AR, Fort Smith, AR, Harrison, AR and Springdale, AR with direct flights from Kansas City and Wichita flown with Fairchild Swearingen Metroliner and Nord 262 turboprops.

According to the Official Airline Guide (OAG), in 1995 five airlines were operating scheduled passenger service into the airport with all flights being operated with regional and commuter turboprop airliners via respective code sharing agreements with various major air carriers including American Eagle with service on behalf of American Airlines with nonstop Saab 340 service from Dallas/Fort Worth and Nashville, Delta Connection operated by Atlantic Southeast Airlines (ASA) on behalf of Delta Air Lines with nonstop Embraer EMB-120 Brasilia flights from Dallas/Fort Worth, Northwest Airlink operated by Express Airlines I on behalf of Northwest Airlines with British Aerospace BAe Jetstream 31 and Saab 340 nonstop service from Memphis and Fort Smith, Trans World Express operated by Trans States Airlines on behalf of Trans World Airlines (TWA) with nonstop ATR 42, ATR 72 and Embraer EMB-120 Brasilia flights from St. Louis and Springfield, MO, and USAir Express operating flights on behalf of USAir with nonstop Beechcraft 1900 service from Kansas City and Little Rock. The OAG listed a combined total of 44 airline flights being operated into the airport every weekday at this time in 1995.

== Facilities ==
The airport covers 631 acres (255 ha) at an elevation of 1,251 feet (381 m). Its one runway, 16/34, is 6,005 by 100 feet (1,830 x 30 m). A historic fire station was located on site.

The Arkansas Air & Military Museum is at the airport, with part of its collection housed in a heritage-listed hangar built in the 1940s and several aircraft on display outdoors.

In the year ending December 31, 2020 the airport had 24,907 aircraft operations, average 68 per day: 86% general aviation, 8% air taxi, 6% military, and <1% airline. 96 aircraft were then based at the airport: 73 single-engine, 7 multi-engine, 14 jets and 2 helicopter.

== See also ==
- List of airports in Arkansas
