= Bendix Trophy =

American annual transcontinental air race (1931–1962)

The original Bendix Trophy on display at the National Air and Space Museum in Washington, D.C.

The Bendix Trophy is a U.S. aeronautical racing trophy. The transcontinental, point-to-point race, sponsored by industrialist Vincent Bendix founder of Bendix Corporation, began in 1931 as part of the National Air Races. Initial prize money for the winners was $15,000. The last Bendix Trophy Race was flown in 1962.

The trophy was brought back in 1998 by AlliedSignal, the then-owner of the Bendix brand name (which later merged with Honeywell), to "recognize contributions to aerospace safety by individuals or institutions through innovation in advanced safety equipment and equipment utilization."

The current awards of the Honeywell Bendix Trophy for Aviation Safety includes a scale reproduction of the original Bendix Trophy design and a citation.

== The race ==
The purpose was to interest engineers in building faster, more reliable, and durable aircraft. Bendix competitors flew from Burbank, California, to Cleveland, Ohio, except for two years when the contest began in New York and ended in Los Angeles.

Famous competitors for the trophy included Jimmy Doolittle, who won the first race, and several women. Amelia Earhart and Ruth Rowland Nichols were the first women pilots to enter the Bendix, taking fifth and sixth places, respectively, in 1933. In 1936, Louise Thaden and her copilot Blanche Noyes won the race. Laura Ingalls finished second. In 1938, Jacqueline Cochran, arguably the greatest female aviator of all time, took home the trophy. Paul Mantz was the only pilot to ever win the Bendix three consecutive years, from 1946 through 1948.

The race was not run during World War II. Postwar winners were frequently military veterans from the United States Army Air Forces: the 1956 winner, Capt. Manuel Fernandez Jr., was the third-ranking Korean War USAF ace. By the 1960s, American interest in air racing declined. This was probably due to an increased focus on the space race during this time. Lt. Richard F. Gordon Jr., the winner in 1961, went on to become an astronaut with NASA.

== Mister Mulligan ==
Mister Mulligan (Howard DGA-6), commissioned and flown by Ben Howard in the 1935 race, was the only airplane ever designed for the specific purpose of winning the Bendix Trophy. The plane was designed and developed by Ben Howard and Gordon Israel, who went on to become an engineer for the Grumman Aircraft Engineering Corporation. Mister Mulligan was designed to fly the entire length of the race nonstop and at high altitude. Neither had ever been done before. Howard and Israel, who co-piloted, won the trophy. Their victory changed how long-distance airplanes were designed.

The second-place plane in the 1935 race was actually a faster airplane but had to make refueling stops, which cost enough time to prevent Roscoe Turner from winning the race. The time difference was only 23.5 seconds between first and second place. The winning difference in speed, over the total distance was less than 0.2 mph (0.32 km/h). Mister Mulligan achieved 238.70 mph (384.15 km/h), compared to Roscoe Turner's 238.52 mph (383.86 km/h).

Mister Mulligan not only won the Bendix Trophy but also the Thompson Trophy, when flown by Harold Neumann in 1935. Instead of a cross-country distance race, the Thompson was a closed-circuit race around pylons, a type of race for which it was not particularly well suited. Entered again in the Bendix in 1936, the Mister Mulligan was completely destroyed when the craft lost one of the propeller blades, resulting in a forced landing, 40 miles (64 km) north of Crownpoint, New Mexico; this crash landing almost killed Howard and his co-pilot wife, Maxine.

== Winners ==
Propeller Class
| Year | Start location | End location | Pilot | Plane | Speed (MPH) | Time (H:M:S) | Prize |
| 1931 | Burbank | Cleveland | Maj. James H. Doolittle | Super Solution | 223.06 | 09:10:21.0 | $7,500 |
| 1932 | Burbank | Cleveland | Capt. Jasper H. Haizlip | WW-44 | 245.00 | 08:19:45.0 | $8,750 |
| 1933 | New York | Los Angeles | Roscoe Turner | WW-44 | 214.78 | 11:30:00.0 | $4,050 |
| 1934 | Burbank | Cleveland | Doug Davis | WW-44 | 216.24 | 09:26:41.0 | $4,500 |
| 1935 | Burbank | Cleveland | Ben Howard | DGA-6 | 238.70 | 08:33:16.3 | $4,500 |
| 1936 | New York | Los Angeles | Louise Thaden; Blanche Noyes | C-17R | 165.35 | 14:55:01.0 | $4,500 |
| 1937 | Los Angeles | Cleveland | Frank W. Fuller Jr. | SEV-2S | 258.20 | 07:54:26.3 | $9,000 |
| 1938 | Los Angeles | Cleveland | Jacqueline Cochran | SEV-2S | 249.11 | 08:10:31.4 | $9,000 |
| 1939 | Los Angeles | Cleveland | Frank W. Fuller Jr. | SEV-2S | 282.10 | 07:14:19.0 | $9,000 |
| 1940 | No races during this period due to World War II | | | | | | |
| 1941 | No races during this period due to World War II | | | | | | |
| 1942 | No races during this period due to World War II | | | | | | |
| 1943 | No races during this period due to World War II | | | | | | |
| 1944 | No races during this period due to World War II | | | | | | |
| 1945 | No races during this period due to World War II | | | | | | |
| 1946 | Los Angeles | Cleveland | Paul Mantz | P-51 | 435.50 | 04:43:14.0 | $10,000 |
| 1947 | Los Angeles | Cleveland | Paul Mantz | P-51 | 460.42 | 04:26:57.4 | $10,000 |
| 1948 | Los Angeles | Cleveland | Paul Mantz | P-51 | 447.98 | 04:33:48.7 | $10,000 |
| 1949 | Rosamond Dry Lake | Cleveland | Joe DeBona (Flying for Jimmy Stewart) | F-51 | 470.14 | 04:16:17.5 | $10,000 |
Jet Class
| Year | Start location | End location | Pilot | Plane | Speed (MPH) | Time (H:M:S) | Prize |
| 1946 | Van Nuys | Cleveland | Leon W. Gray | F/P-80A | 494.78 | 04:08:00.0 | |
| 1947 | | Cleveland | Leon W. Gray | F/P-80A | 507.26 | 04:02:00.0 | |
| 1948 | | Cleveland | Ens. F. E. Brown | FJ-1 | 489.53 | 04:11:00.0 | |
| 1949 | | Cleveland | Vernon A. Ford | F-84E | 529.61 | 03:45:51.0 | |
| 1950 | No race this year due to Korean War | | | | | | |
| 1951 | Muroc Field | Detroit | Col. Keith K. Compton | F-86A | 553.76 | 03:27:00.0 | |
| 1952 | No race this year due to Korean War | | | | | | |
| 1953 | Muroc Field | Wright-Patterson Air Force Base | Maj. William T. Whisner Jr. | F-86F | 603.55 | 03:05:25.0 | |
| 1954 | Edwards Air Force Base | Dayton | Capt. Edward W. Kenny | F-84F | 616.21 | 03:01:56.0 | |
| 1955 | Victorville | Philadelphia | Col. Carlos Talbott | F-100C | 610.726 | | |
| 1956 | George Air Force Base | Tinker Air Force Base | Capt. Manuel Fernandez Jr. | F-100C | 666.66 | | |
| 1957 | Chicago | Andrews Air Force Base | Capt. Kenneth Chandler | F-102A | 679.00 | 02:54:45.0 | |
| 1958 | No award these years | | | | | | |
| 1959 | No award these years | | | | | | |
| 1960 | No award these years | | | | | | |
| 1961 | Los Angeles | New York | Lt. Richard F. Gordon Jr. Lt. Bobbie R. Young | F4H-1 | 869.74 | 02:47:00.0 | |
| 1962 | Los Angeles | New York | Capt. Robert G. Sowers; Capt. Robert MacDonald; Capt. John T. Walton | B-58A | 1,214.17 | 02:00:56.8 | |

== Honeywell Bendix trophy for Aviation Safety recipients ==
| Year | Recipient | Company |
|---|---|---|
| 1998 | Capt. David A. Fleming; Capt. Edward D. Mendenhall; Capt. Edmond L. Soliday | British Airways; Gulfstream Aircraft; United Airlines |
| 1999 | Leonard M. Greene | Safe Flight Instrument Corp. |
| 2000 | James F. Bothwell | STAT Medevac |
| 2001 | No award this year | |
| 2002 | | Gulfstream Aerospace Corp. |
| 2003 | Peter F. Sheppard | UK Air Accidents Investigation Branch |
| 2004 | | Dassault Aviation |
| 2005 | Earl F. Weener, Ph.D. | |
| 2006 | No award this year | |
| 2007 | | Gulfstream Aerospace Corporation |
| 2008 | | The Mode S Radar Tools Project, U.K. National Air Traffic Services |
| 2011 | | National Air Transport System (NATS) and Airbox Aerospace |

== See also ==
- List of aviation awards
