= Howard DGA-6 =

Type of aircraft

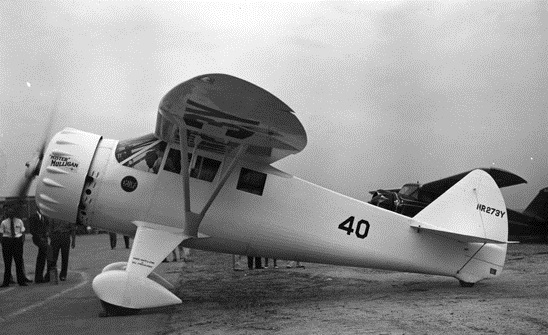

General information
- Type: Air racing
- National origin: United States
- Designer: Ben Howard, Gordon Israel
- Number built: 1

History
- Introduction date: 1934

The Howard DGA-6 was a pioneer racing plane, nicknamed "Mister Mulligan". It was the only airplane ever designed for the specific purpose of winning the Bendix Trophy. The plane was designed and developed by Ben Howard and Gordon Israel, who later became an engineer for the Grumman Aircraft Engineering Corporation. Mister Mulligan was designed to fly the entire length of the race nonstop and at high altitude. Neither had ever been done before. Mister Mulligan won the trophy, and thus changed the way in which long distance airplanes were designed.

== History ==
The Bendix Trophy was a cross-country race from the west coast to the site of the National Air Races in Cleveland, Ohio, and typically was the starting event of the week-long aviation festival. The Thompson Trophy was awarded to the winner of the unlimited division in closed-course pylon racing at the National Air Races.

The sole original DGA-6 was constructed in 1934 in the defunct factory of the American Eagle-Lincoln Aircraft based at Fairfax Airport in Kansas City, Missouri. It featured a steel tube fuselage with a plywood-skinned wing. Howard freely admitted he was inspired by "seeing the Monocoupe from the wrong end" during air races; The DGA-6 can thus be termed an "overgrown Monocoupe".

While en route to the 1934 air races, oxygen and fuel system problems caused an off-field landing, which damaged the landing gear and propeller. The aircraft could not be repaired in time and missed the 1934 season.

In the 1935 Bendix race the aircraft was loaded with 300 gallons of gasoline, 30 gallons of oil and oxygen equipment for two, giving it the ability to fly for seven hours at 22,000 feet (6,700 m). At that load the aircraft required 1,500 feet (460 m) of runway and had an initial climb rate of close to 2000 ft/min.

Howard and Israel flew the DGA-6 in the 30 August 1935 Bendix Trophy race and won with a speed of 238.70 miles per hour, and Harold Neumann racing the DGA-6 flew at 220.19 mph (354.36 km/h) in winning the 2 September 1935 Thompson Trophy race at the 1935 National Air Races. No other pilot or single aircraft had ever won both races. Howard's DGA-6 also had the distinction of being the only racer during the golden age of airshows to evolve into a successful commercial production aircraft, first as the Howard DGA-8 and DGA-9, and later the DGA-11 and DGA-12.

Howard's engineering advantage was his low-drag airframe and the use of the 850-horsepower (630 kW) Pratt & Whitney Wasp radial. The fuel capacity of the four-seat Mister Mulligan made the difference in the Bendix race, as Howard and Israel beat Roscoe Turner by less than a minute, thanks to two fewer fueling stops in the race from Burbank, California, to Cleveland, although Turner's 1,000 hp (750 kW) Pratt & Whitney R-1690 Hornet on his Wedell-Williams Model 44 racer gave him the power advantage.

Mister Mulligan broke Wedell-Williams' three-year streak of wins in the Bendix. By the end of the week, Howard and his DGA-6 replaced Wedell-Williams as the rising star of aviation by upsetting defending champion Turner in the Thompson race after he was forced out. Newspapers hailed the 1935 event as the "Ben Howard National Air Races".

Unfortunately, the DGA-6's days on the national air race scene were limited. The next year, Howard and his wife Maxine were injured when Mister Mulligan lost a propeller blade and crash-landed near Crownpoint, New Mexico during the latter stages of the 1936 Bendix (New York–Los Angeles) race. Howard recovered from the serious injuries resulting from the crash, but lost a leg in the accident and Mister Mulligan was destroyed. Roscoe Turner met a similar fate, ground-looping on a rough field in Texas. The misfortunes of Howard and Turner opened the way for Arkansan Louise Thaden in her Beechcraft Model 17 Staggerwing to become the first woman to win a national air trophy.

The success of Mister Mulligan led to the formation of the Howard Aircraft Corporation on January 1, 1937.

== Reproduction aircraft ==
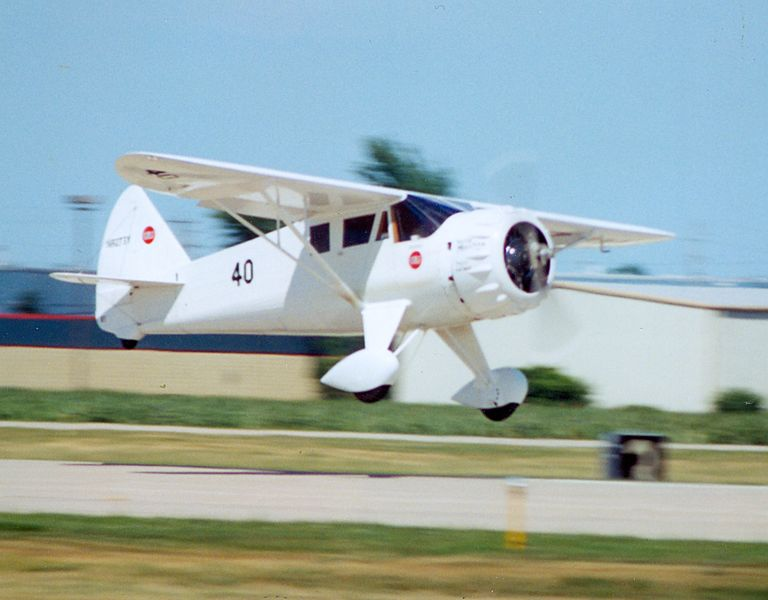
Mister Mulligan replica at Oshkosh, Wisconsin, 2002

Thirty-four years after the accident, racing enthusiast, Bob Reichardt tracked down Mister Mulligan's crash site and was surprised to find most of the parts were still in usable condition, protected by local dry, mountain climate. With the salvaged parts as patterns, Reichardt was able to recreate Mister Mulligan, but was killed in 1977 while performing a timed run over the Tonopah, Nevada dry lake.

A second replica DGA-6 was built by Jim Younkin of Springdale, Arkansas. After Younkin's death, Doug Rozendaal from Mason City, Iowa acquired the aircraft. Younkin and "Bud" Dake also designed and built the Mullicoupe, an original design utilizing features of both Mister Mulligan and the Monocoupe 90 that inspired it.

Another derivative aircraft is the Dickenson-Howard DGA-21, built by Bruce Dickenson of Santa Paula, California. It is based on design features of the DGA-6 (including the Pratt & Whitney R-1340 Wasp engine) and the DGA-15, and its DGA-21 designation is simply "6 + 15".

== Specifications (Howard DGA-6) ==
Data from Some Damn Good Airplanes

General characteristics

- Crew: 1
- Capacity: 3 passengers
- Length: 25 ft 1 in (7.65 m)
- Wingspan: 31 ft 8 in (9.65 m)
- Height: 8 ft 11 in (2.72 m)
- Wing area: 150.7 sq ft (14.00 m^{2})
- Empty weight: 2,600 lb (1,179 kg)
- Gross weight: 4,100 lb (1,860 kg) (normal)
- Max takeoff weight: 5,300 lb (2,404 kg) (racing)
- Powerplant: 1 × Pratt & Whitney Wasp air-cooled radial engine, 500 hp (370 kW)

Performance

- Maximum speed: 287 mph (462 km/h, 249 kn) (racing)
- Cruise speed: 231 mph (372 km/h, 201 kn)
- Service ceiling: 21,000 ft (6,400 m)

== See also ==
- Monocoupe 90
- Mullicoupe
