= Howard DGA-3 =

Howard DGA-3 "Pete"
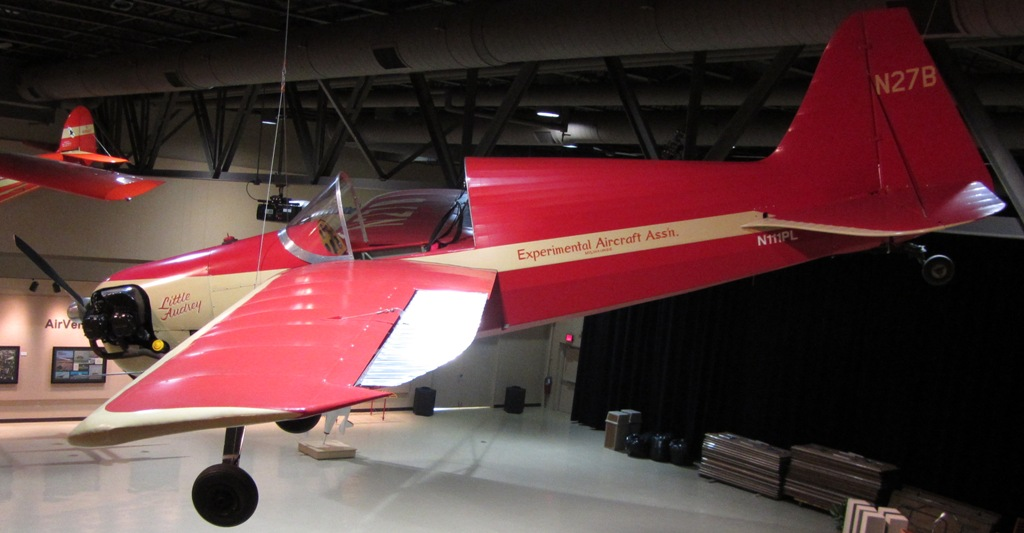
- "Little Audrey" on display at the EAA AirVenture Muesum

General information
- Type: Racing aircraft
- National origin: United States of America
- Designer: Ben Howard, Gordon Israel

The Howard DGA-3 "Pete", a.k.a. "Damned Good Airplane – 3", "Baker Special", and "Little Audrey" is the third aircraft built by Ben Howard, and the first in a series of racing aircraft. Howard claimed that the aircraft was so fast from his use of "Go Grease".

== Design and development ==
The DGA-3 was started as a side project based on getting the best performing aircraft using a Wright Gipsy engine Howard had available. The aircraft went from the drawing board to completion in eight months.

The fuselage was made of welded steel tubing with aircraft fabric covering. The control surfaces were wood with plywood covering. The cockpit was sized to an absolute minimum. The axle between wheels was shaped like an airfoil, producing some of the lift. In 1947, "Pete" was rebuilt as the "Baker Special" with a Continental engine for midget racing. The aircraft was rebuilt once again by the Experimental Aircraft Association founder Paul Poberezny as "Little Audrey". The aircraft was mounted with Luscombe wings and a Continental A-75.

== Operational history ==
- 1930 National Air Races – Howard flew five firsts and two third-place finishes at 163 mph.
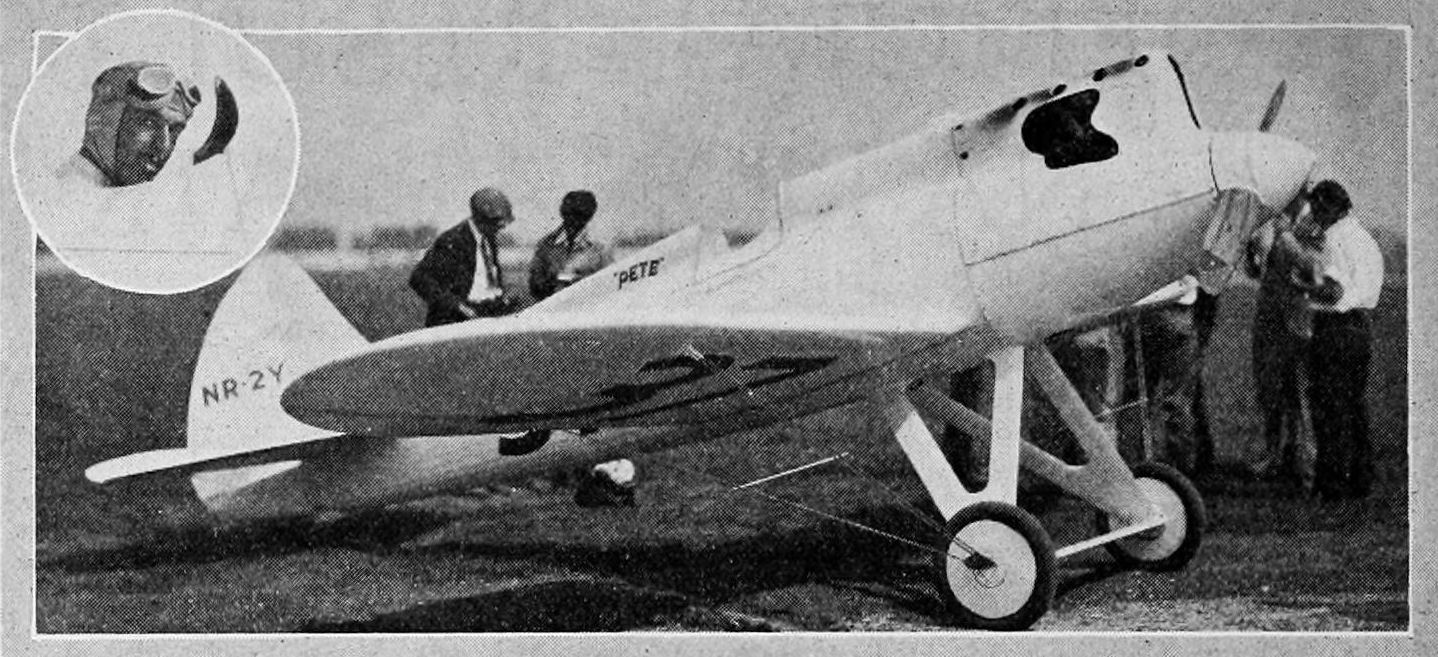
  Howard DGA-3 'Pete' at the 1930 National Air Races. Inset: Ben O. Howard. Photo from Aero Digest October,1930
- 1930 Thompson Trophy race, third place.
- 1931 National Air Races – three second, one fourth, and one sixth-place finish.
- 1932 National Air Races – one second place at 127.347 mph (205 km/h).
- 1933 Chicago Air Race – pilot Joe Jacobson flew to Two second and one fifth-place finish.
- 1933 International Air Race – one fourth, one fifth, and one sixth place with pilots Helen Lantz, Gordon Israel, and Art Gross.
- 1934 National Air Races – Joe Jacobson purchased and flew "Pete" to one fourth, and three fifth-place finishes at 159 mph.
- 1935 National Air Races – One third and one fourth-place finish at 147 mph.
- 1947 Goodyear races – As the "Baker Special" The aircraft was partially destroyed in a hangar fire after the races.

In 1953 "Pete" was rebuilt as a homebuilt sportsplane "Little Audrey". The aircraft flew until 1981. It was last owned and flown jointly by Victor Edwin Zinn and Walter Fritz who based the aircraft in Noblesville Indiana. After being slightly damaged in a runaway airplane incident Zinn and Fritz, both active EAA members elected to donate the aircraft to the EAA museum. It was once in the collection of the Crawford Auto-Aviation Museum. A restoration was performed and the aircraft was donated to the EAA Airventure Museum in Oshkosh, Wisconsin in 1991.

== Specifications (Howard DGA-3) ==
Data from Sport Aviation

General characteristics

- Capacity: one
- Length: 17 ft 9 in (5.41 m)
- Wingspan: 20 ft 1 in (6.12 m)
- Wing area: 63 sq ft (5.9 m^{2})
- Airfoil: M6
- Empty weight: 669 lb (303 kg)
- Gross weight: 900 lb (408 kg)
- Powerplant: 1 × Wright Gipsy engine 326 cu. in. Inline four cylinder, 90 hp (67 kW)

Performance

- Wing loading: 14.3 lb/sq ft (70 kg/m^{2})

== See also ==
Aircraft of comparable role, configuration, and era

- Graham-Perren Racer
