= Ben Howard (aviator) =

American aviator and aeronautical engineer (1904–1970)

Benjamin Odell Howard (February 4, 1904 – December 4, 1970), was an American aviator and aeronautical engineer, whose aircraft won the Bendix Trophy and the Thompson Trophy in 1935.

== History ==
At 17 Howard's interest in flying was sparked when he saw a band of gypsy fliers performing in their flying circus. By 18 he had saved up enough cash to buy an OX-5 powered Standard biplane. In those days learning how to fly was often self-taught and Howard thought he was up to it. The Standard was a safe plane and he seemed to be learning fine until one flight when he entered a spin and was unable to pull out. He crashed breaking his leg and writing off the plane, as well.

It took a long time to set his leg but at age 19, Howard moved to Dallas and started working in the Curtiss Aircraft factory. The pay was not as good as what others jobs paid but what he learned about design and construction of aircraft was worth more than money. Over the next few years he tinkered with aircraft design using spare parts to build his first plane, at the request of a Houston bootlegger, who dubbed the resulting "rum-runner" a "Darned Good Airplane," DGA-1 giving it and future Howard aircraft their trademarked initials of DGA. Howard later in life admitted to doing some airborne bootlegging himself during Prohibition.

== Aircraft racing ==
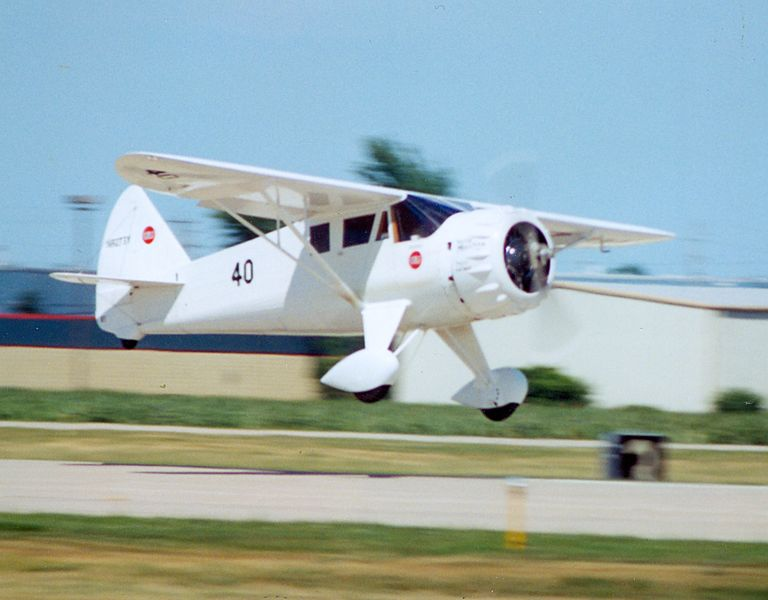
Mr Mulligan Replica at Oshkosh Wisconsin 2002

In his first racing plane, "Pete", Howard won five air races. As competition increased, he and his partner, Gordon Israel, built two larger, low-wing, wire-braced monoplanes, "Mike" and "Ike" (which competed under the name Miss Chevrolet in honor of its sponsor). Fitted with a special carburetor, Ike was particularly quick in flying in an inverted position, and for a time held the world record for inverted speed. His sixth plane was called Mister Mulligan. It placed in competition for several pilots before it was destroyed in an accident in the 1936 New York - Los Angeles Bendix Transcontinental Race, a propeller failure costing Howard both the plane and his leg, and injured both his wife's - Maxine "Mike" Howard - legs. Mister Mulligan's fame led to the DGA-8 and the DGA-9 as well as the 1937 formation of the Howard Aircraft Corporation, which ran until 1944.

After the accident, Howard flew airmail and passenger transports, became an outstanding test pilot, and was recognized by aircraft designers as a natural aeronautical engineer. Howard was said to be an aviator's aviator, and was also credited as a man who from natural, inborn ability, could frequently spot flaws designed by the most competent graduate engineers.

== Engineering and test pilot career ==
The first Douglas DC-3 aircraft were ordered by American Airlines (1935) and powered by Wright Cyclone engines. Soon after, United Air Lines ordered the DC-3, but specified Pratt & Whitney Twin Wasp engines. Benny Howard was dispatched to Douglas to oversee the installation of the new engine. His career at Douglas continued for many years, including piloting the initial tests of the DC-4E, A-26 Invader, DC-6, and Fairchild C-82 Packet aircraft. He also served as test pilot on the Budd RB-1 Conestoga and other aircraft. He was elected an Honorary Fellow of the Society of Experimental Test Pilots.

Using knowledge gained from his racing days, he developed the Howard Optimizer Kit for the DC-3, and at the end of his career was doing low-speed wind tunnel tests for the Carroll Shelby Cobra racecar. Howard died in Los Angeles Friday, Dec. 4, 1970. Pioneer airplane builder Donald Douglas Sr. delivered his eulogy.
