= Bréguet 393T =

1931 airliner family by Bréguet

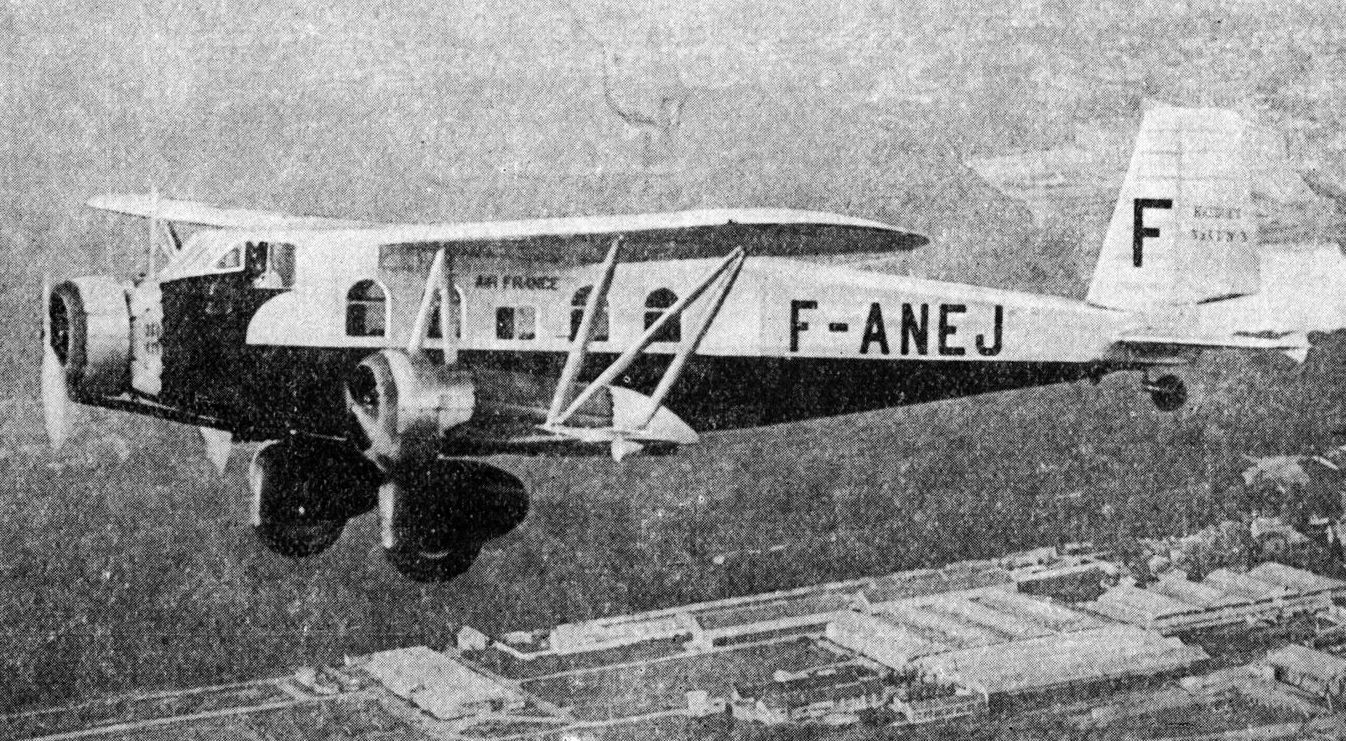

General information
- Type: Airliner
- Manufacturer: Bréguet
- Primary user: Air France
- Number built: 9

History
- Introduction date: July 1934
- First flight: February 1931

The Bréguet 390T, 392T and 393T were a family of French propeller-driven sesquiplane airliners designed and produced by the French aircraft manufacturer Bréguet.

First flown in February 1931, the Bréguet 390T family attracted the attention of the recently formed flag carrier Air France, which acquired a total of six 393Ts along with the sole 392T prototype. These were used on the Toulouse–Casablanca and the Natal–Buenos Aires routes, as well as various short-haul routes between Paris and nearby European destinations in the latter portion of their careers.

== Design ==
The Bréguet 390T family were large three-engine sesquiplanes of all-metal construction with a fixed tailwheel undercarriage. Its general structure comprises the same principles as to the earlier Bréguet 270 military reconnaissance aircraft; however, the girder-based fuselage of the Bréguet 270 was substituted for a more conventional rectangular fuselage that provided sufficient internal volume to accommodate up to ten passengers along with their baggage. The interior was divided by a series of bulkheads that were joined by sturdy angle members to which the aircraft's duralumin covering was directly riveted to. One such bulkhead formed the partition between the passenger cabin and the cockpit, although a door was provided to permit internal passage between the two compartments.

In the cockpit, the pilot was seated on the left side, at which position relatively good external visibility was available. Close by, a second seat was present that could be used for various purposes, such as by a second pilot, mechanic, navigator, or radio operator, or some combination thereof; dual flight controls were provided. Above their position was a movable panel, which was intended for emergency egress, for which the pilot was typically provided with a parachute. To the rear of the cabin, an aircraft lavatory that was effectively concealed by the door from the cabin during the boarding and de-boarding of passengers. The door between the cabin and lavatory could be removed; reasons for this included the accommodation of bulky packages or stretcher-bound personnel. As such, the aircraft could be readily converted into an air ambulance configuration. The standard external door was already specifically designed from the onset to readily permit the passage of casualties on stretchers. Two separate baggage compartments were provided, a larger one at the front of the aircraft and another at the rear.

The lower wing of the Bréguet 390T could be divided into several elements, such as the spars, leading edge, the area between the spar and the ailerons, and the ailerons themselves. An elastic mounting was used for these ailerons and shared their pinion-and-ratchet actuation method with that of the Bréguet 270; whole-span ailerons were fitted to both the upper and lower wings. Structurally, it is centred around a single box spar and was directly attached to the base of the fuselage by a pair of wide triangular-shaped vertical gussets. Various core elements of the aircraft are directly supported by this spar, including the sliding forks of the undercarriage and the duralumin bearers of the two lateral engines.

The upper wing, while it had a uniform profile across the whole span, consisted of two symmetrical sections that joined on top of the fuselage. It was supported by two identical spars composed of steel that were connected via rigid X-shaped bracing; each spar had two flanges of drawn steel connected by a web of corrugated sheet steel. The three-part ribs were attached via tubular steel rivets to small stamped duralumin gussets that were also riveted to the spar webs. Each part of the rib was stamped as a single piece of sheet dura1umin; this same material was used for the covering of the wing. The wing tips were detachable. The wings are braced by two pairs of V-shape struts.

The tail unit of the aircraft had a cantilever structure that comprised steel spars and duralumin ribs. The tail surfaces, which had symmetrical biconvex profiles, used steel hinges and a duralumin covering. The horizontal empennage had a single-piece elevator that could be controlled via a compact flap mounted on the middle of its trailing edge. The vertical empennage consists of a fin and a rudder. The movable tail surfaces were actuated by the pilot via steel wires that ran along the top of the fuselage and were guided using pulleys.

The Bréguet 390T was powered by three engines, such as the Gnome-Rhône 7Kd radial engine; the aircraft had been designed so that various powerplants could be selected; virtually any radial air-cooled engine of comparable weight and power could be installed. These engines were mounted on duralumin bearers that were attached to the nose of the fuselage or to the lower-wing spar by four screw-type bolts that facilitated rapid removal. Each of these engine bearer formed a block that comprised the engine, its immediate accessories, fire extinguisher, oil tank and oil radiator. Each lateral engine nacelle contained a 300-liter (79.25-gal.) fuel tank; in addition, two other fuel tanks with a combined capacity of 300 liters (79.25 gal.), that were typically located at the base of the fuselage, exclusively supplied the central engine under standard operating conditions. However, all of the tanks could be interconnected to one another, which was controlled via a series of stopcocks; furthermore, all fuel tanks could be rapidly emptied mid-flight if required. The aircraft was reportedly designed to be capable of maintaining level flight if any one of its engines stopped.

The undercarriage was equipped with various internally developed elements, including Bréguet-type oleopneumatic shock absorbers and Bréguet-built hydraulic brakes that could be applied either simultaneously or differentially at the pilot's discretion. Each wheel, which were equipped with straight-side tyres, was mounted in an axleless configuration upon a steel fork that, via steel tubing, directly attached to the spar of the lower wing. This tube slid within a steel sleeve with bronze rings traversed by two solid pins with four lugs riveted to the spar.

== Operational history ==
During the mid-1930s, the newly constituted flag carrier Air France acquired a total of six 393Ts along with the sole 392T prototype from Breguet. The latter was exclusively used as a cargo plane. The aircraft were originally deployed on the Toulouse-Casablanca route and later on the Natal-Buenos Aires route. Towards the end of their careers, all remaining 393Ts were recalled to Paris and used on various short-haul routes between Paris and nearby European destinations.

== Variants ==
390T

- First prototype, powered by Gnome-Rhône 5Kd radial engines. One aircraft built, destroyed in a crash early on in the flight test programme.

391T

- Second prototype, similar to 390T.

392T

- Freighter version powered by Hispano-Suiza 9Qc radial engines, one built.

393T

- Definitive production version with Gnome-Rhône 7Kd radial engines, six built.

== Operators ==
France

- Air France

== Specifications (393T) ==
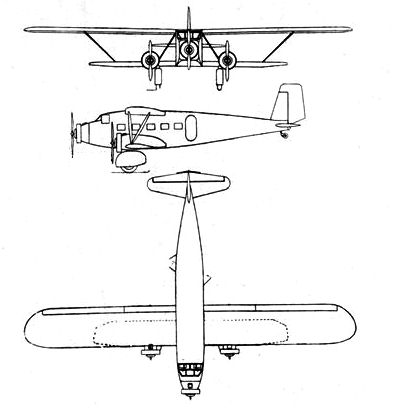
Breguet 393T 3-view drawing from L'Aerophile February 1934

Data from European Transport Aircraft since 1910, National Advisory Committee for Aeronautics

General characteristics

- Crew: two pilots
- Capacity: ten passengers
- Length: 14.76 m (48 ft 5 in)
- Upper wingspan: 21.71 m (71 ft 3 in)
- Lower wingspan: 14.76 m (48 ft 5 in)
- Wing area: 66.46 m^{2} (715.4 sq ft)
- Empty weight: 3,529–3,996 kg (7,780–8,810 lb)
- Gross weight: 6,000 kg (13,228 lb)
- Powerplant: 3 × Gnome-Rhône 7Kd , 260 kW (350 hp) each

Performance

- Maximum speed: 249 km/h (155 mph, 134 kn) at sea level
- Cruise speed: 235 km/h (146 mph, 127 kn) at 1,000 m (3,280 ft)
- Range: 945–975 km (587–606 mi, 510–526 nmi)
- Service ceiling: 5,850 m (19,190 ft)
- Time to altitude: 11 minutes to 2,000 m (6,560 ft)
