= Farman F.190 =

F.190
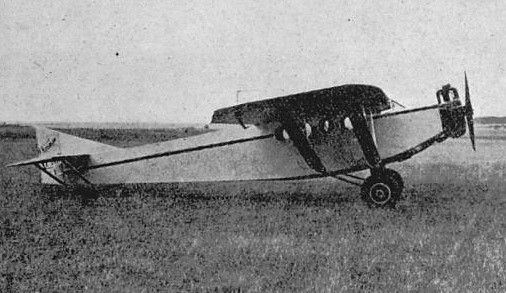

General information
- Type: Civil utility aircraft
- Manufacturer: Farman
- Number built: 158

History
- First flight: 1928

The Farman F.190 was a utility aircraft built in France in the 1920s and 1930s. It was a high-wing, strut-braced monoplane of conventional configuration with a fully enclosed cabin and fixed, tailskid undercarriage. Popular both as a private aircraft and in the air taxi role, some 30 examples were also operated by airlines in France and elsewhere in Europe. Fifteen of these joined Air France's fleet in 1933 from the fleets of the smaller airlines it had absorbed.

A dedicated air ambulance version was built as the F.197S (for "Sanitaire") with provision for two litters and an attendant.

In 1932, a version with a slightly enlarged cabin, revised tail fin, and four-blade propeller entered production as the Farman F.390.

== Variants ==
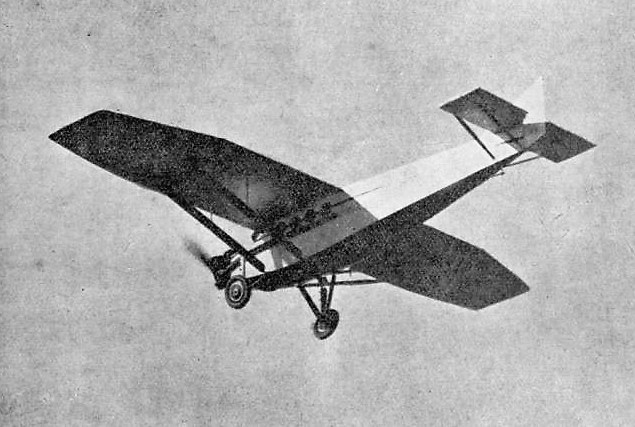
Farman F.190 photo from Annuaire de L'Aéronautique 1931

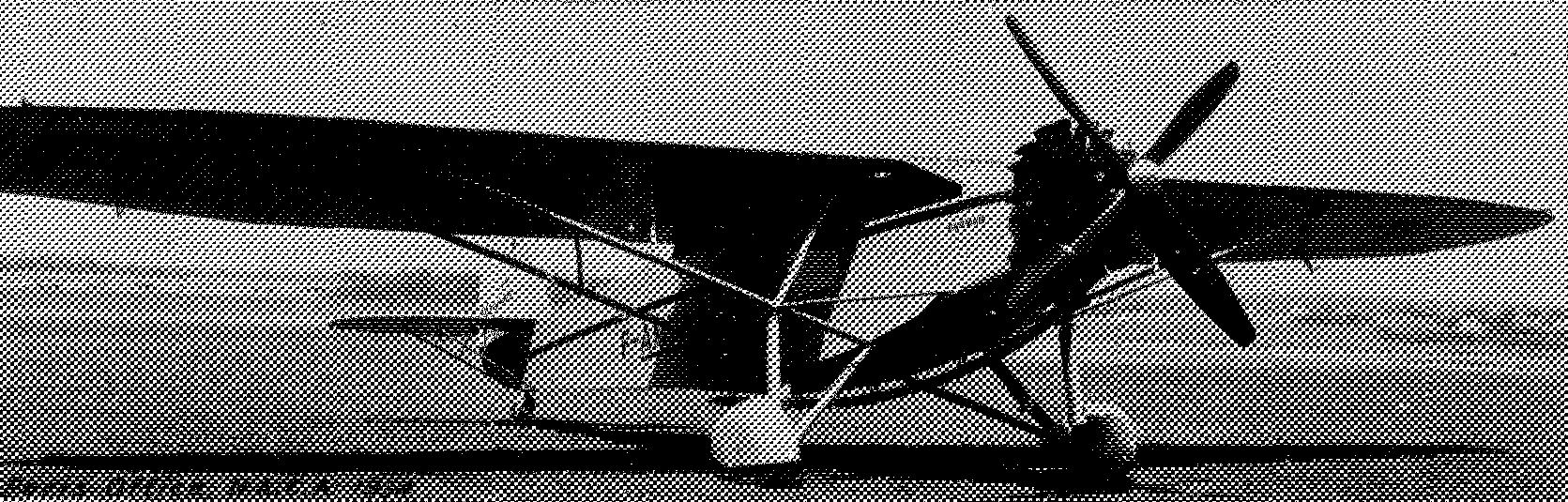
Farman F.393 photo from NACA-SR-26

Data from: Aviafrance

F.190
main production version with a 170 kW (230 hp) Gnome et Rhône 5Ba engine, 57 built.
F.191
Powered by a 180 kW (240 hp) Gnome et Rhône 5Bc for long-distance flying, one built for a customer in Portugal.
F.192
version with a 170 kW (230 hp) Salmson 9Ab engine, 22 built.

F.192/1
version with a 210 kW (280 hp) Salmson 9Aba engine, 2 built.

F.193
version with a 190 kW (250 hp) Farman 9Ea engine, 22 built.

F.193/1
version with a 210 kW (280 hp) Farman 9Ebr engine, one built.

F.194
version with a 190 kW (250 hp) Hispano-Suiza 6Mb engine, 4 built.

F.195
version with a 170 kW (230 hp) Salmson 9Ab engine, 6 built for Venezuela.

F.196
version with a 220 kW (300 hp) Gnome & Rhône 7Kb engine, one built.

F.197
version with a 180 kW (240 hp) Lorraine 7Me Mizar engine, 9 built.

F.197S
air ambulance version of F.197
F.198
version with a 190 kW (250 hp) Renault 9Pa engine, 2 built.

F.199
version with a 220 kW (300 hp) Lorraine 9Na Algol engine, 6 built.

F.390
version with a 110 kW (150 hp) Farman 7Ear engine, 6 built.

F.391
version with a 140 kW (190 hp) Farman 9Ecr engine, 4 built.

F.392
version with a 110 kW (150 hp) Farman 7Ear engine, 4 built.

F.393
version with a 140 kW (190 hp) Farman 9Ecr engine, 11 built.

== Operators ==
=== Civil operators ===
France

- Air Afrique
- Air France
- Air Orient
- Air Union
- CIDNA
- Cie Transafricaine d'Aviation
- Lignes Farman

Lithuania

- Aero Club of Lithuania - 1 plane (F.393), Reg. No. LY-LRK

Portugal

- SPELA

Romania

- LARES

Yugoslavia

- Aeroput

=== Military operators ===
Brazil

- Brazilian Air Force

Ethiopia

- Ethiopian Air Force

Portugal

- Portuguese Air Force

(Spain) Spanish Republic

- Spanish Republican Air Force

Venezuela

- Venezuelan Air Force

Uruguay

- Uruguayan Air Force

== Specifications (F.190) ==
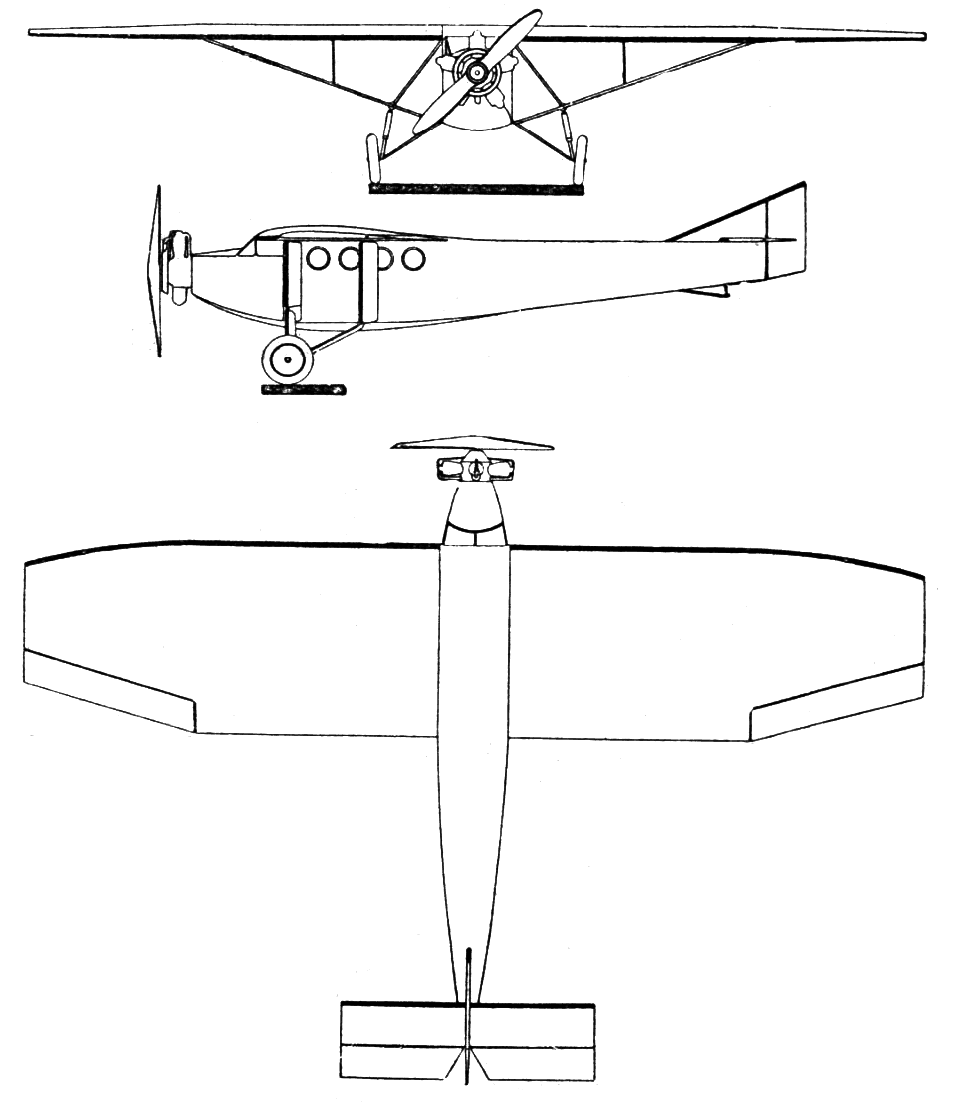
Farman F.190 3-view drawing from Les Ailes November 15, 1928

Data from Jane's all the World's Aircraft 1928, Aviafrance:Farman F-190

General characteristics

- Crew: 1
- Capacity: 4 passengers
- Length: 10 m (32 ft 10 in)
- Wingspan: 14 m (45 ft 11 in)
- Height: 3 m (9 ft 10 in)
- Wing area: 39 m^{2} (420 sq ft)
- Empty weight: 750 kg (1,653 lb)
- Gross weight: 1,600 kg (3,527 lb)
- Powerplant: 1 × Gnome et Rhône 5Ba 5-cylinder air-cooled radial piston engine, 170 kW (230 hp)
- Propellers: 2-bladed fixed pitch propeller

Performance

- Maximum speed: 185 km/h (115 mph, 100 kn)
- Cruise speed: 165 km/h (103 mph, 89 kn)
- Range: 800 km (500 mi, 430 nmi)
- Service ceiling: 5,150 m (16,900 ft)
- Wing loading: 41 kg/m^{2} (8.4 lb/sq ft)
- Power/mass: 0.1075 kW/kg (0.0654 hp/lb)

== Bibliography ==
- Barrière, Michel; Roumy, Frank (September–October 2010). "Le Farman 190 et ses dérivés". Avions (in French). No. 177. pp. 32–45.
- Barrière, Michel (July–August 2011). "Commentaires sur les plans des F.190 à F.199". Avions (in French). No. 182. pp. 50–55.
- Comas, Mathieu (September 1999). "La débacle des ambulanciers... ou l'histoire inconnu d'une section d'avions ambulanciers en mai-juin 1940" [Debacle of the Ambulances: Or the Unknown History of an Aerial Ambulance Section in May–June 1940]. Avions (in French). No. 78. pp. 18–21. ISSN 1243-8650.
- Liron, Jean (1984). Les avions Farman. Collection Docavia (in French). Vol. 21. Paris: Éditions Larivière. OCLC 37146471.
- Moulin, Jacques & Cony, Christophe (May 2001). "L'aviation était toute sa vie: Léna Bernstein" [Aviation was Her Whole Life: Léna Bernstein]. Avions: Toute l'Aéronautique et son histoire (in French) (98): 59–60. ISSN 1243-8650.
- Stroud, John (1966). European Transport Aircraft since 1910. London: Putnam.
- Taylor, Michael J. H. (1989). Jane's Encyclopedia of Aviation. London: Studio Editions. p. 379.
- World Aircraft Information Files. London: Bright Star Publishing. pp. File 894 Sheet 16.
