= Lioré et Olivier LeO H-242 =

LeO H.242
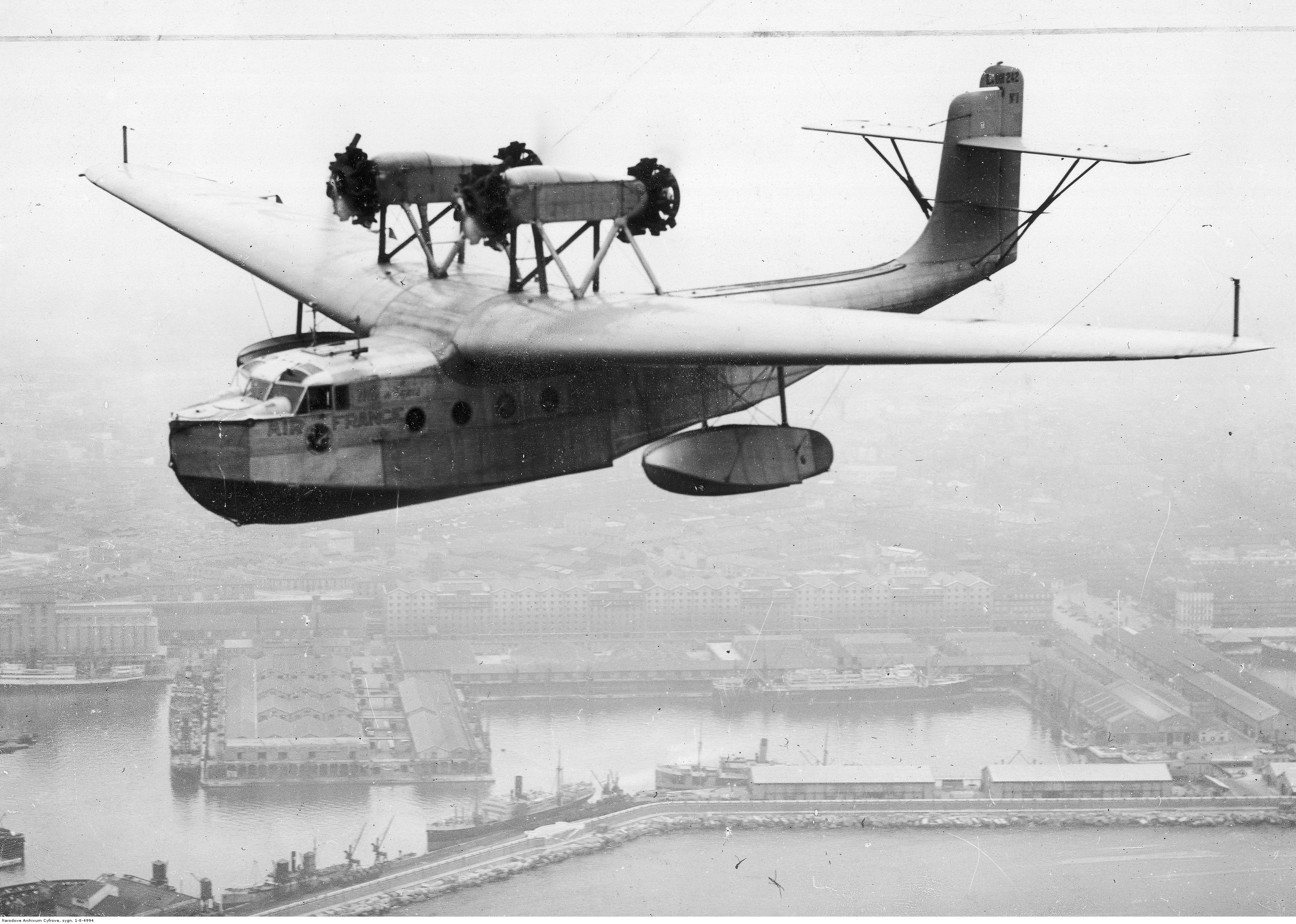

General information
- Type: Passenger flying boat
- National origin: France
- Manufacturer: Lioré et Olivier
- Primary user: Air France
- Number built: 15

History
- Introduction date: 1933
- First flight: 1929
- Retired: 1942

The Lioré et Olivier LeO H.242 was a monoplane flying boat aircraft designed and produced by the French aircraft manufacturer Lioré et Olivier. It was used for European passenger air services in the 1930s, including by the flag carrier Air France. One LeO H.242 was depicted near the end of Hergé's The Adventures of Tintin comic King Ottokar's Sceptre.

== Design ==
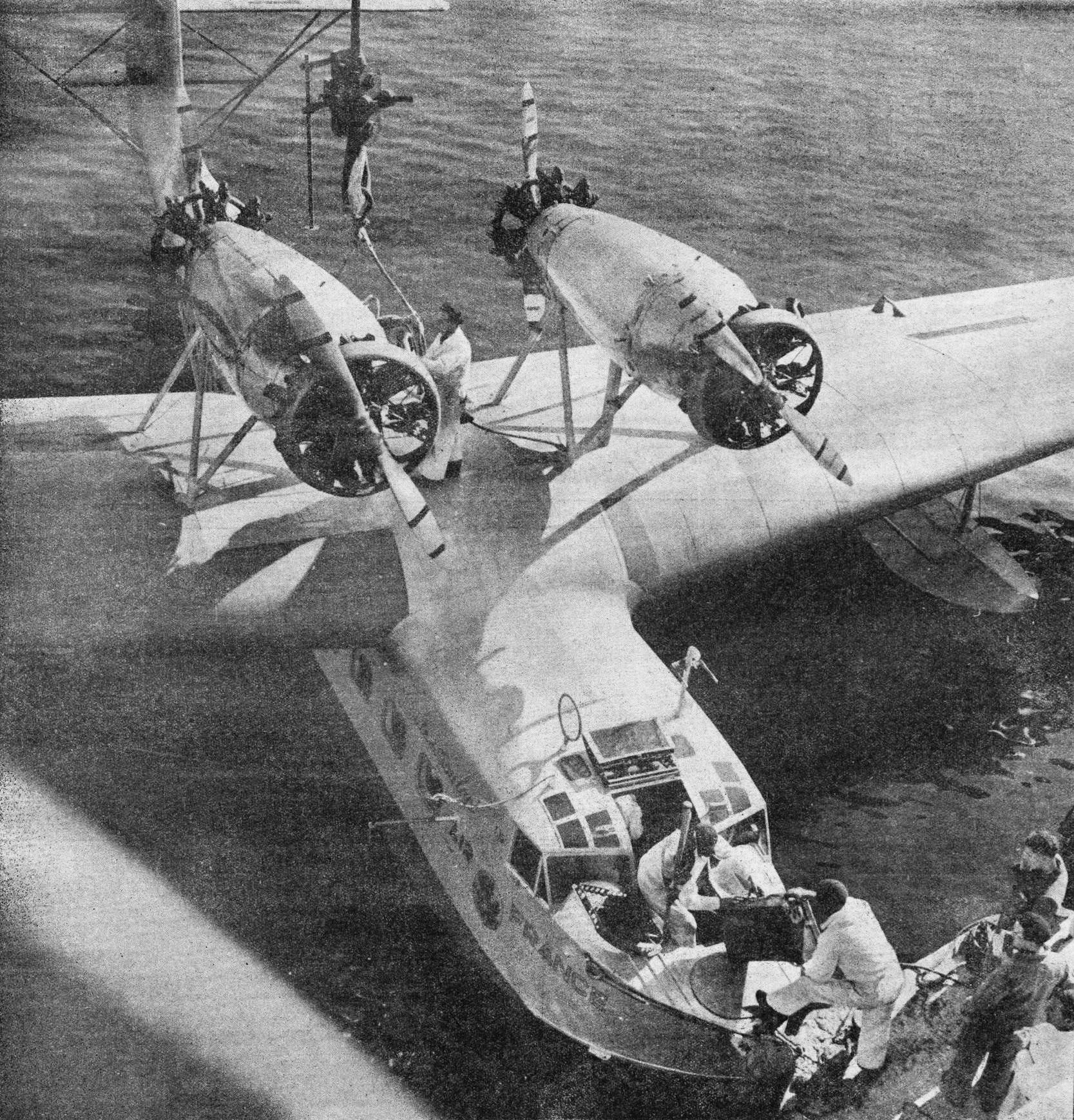
An Air France LeO H-242 at Marseille

The Lioré et Olivier LeO H.242 was a monoplane flying boat. While early-built examples had wooden hulls while later-built flying boats used a duralumin hull instead. The single-step bow of the hull was specifically designed to minimise water disturbance; both the take-off and landing runs were relatively smooth and typically generated no bow waves after early issues pertaining to the angle between the keel and the chines were resolved. At least a few flying boats were outfitted with an experimental movable step that allowed for the shape of the after-hull bottom to be modified.

The hull was internally divided into three large compartments that were separated by a pair of water-tight bulkheads, one of which was outfitted with a door that would instantaneously close. The manufacturer claimed that these water-tight compartments in the full, in conjunction with those in the wing, meant that the flying boat was practically unsinkable. Substantial attention was paid to safety during the design process. The forward compartment contained the navigator's and pilot's stations, the radio apparatus, and stowage for equipment such as the anchor. The central compartment contained the flying boat's sizable and relatively luxurious cabin that could accommodate as many as 15 passengers along with an lavatory. The aft compartment was used exclusively for the carriage of baggage and freight and could be entered mid-flight via an internal sliding door. Considerable attention were put into noise dampening measures as part of wider efforts to maximise passenger comfort levels. These measures included the elevated position of the engines, the upward direction of the exhaust, an intentionally empty chamber directly underneath the engine bed that functioned as a silencer, and the incorporation of a rubber pad into the attachment points between the wing and the hull. The distance between the passenger cabin and the fuel tanks meant that it was permissible for occupants to smoke while onboard.

The wing of the flying boat was a relatively low-weight cantilever monoplane design with a trapezoidal plan form and a progressive profile, being convex at the joint but concave at the wing tips. It had a plywood covering that was quite resistant to torsional stresses. The wing structure consists of two main box spars accompanied by auxiliary spars and interrupted ribs; the apex flanges were spruce with birch plywood webs internal bracing. Internally, it was divided into numerous water-tight compartments while the overall wing comprised three distinct sections. The end sections of the wing were joined to the central section via ball-and-socket joints that eliminated all play and vibration while also enabling an automatic centring of the axes. While alighted on the water or otherwise relatively stationary, the end sections of the wing could be removed, having been held in place using relatively simplistic screws.

The leading edge of the wing was formed by the aircraft's fuel tanks, which were composed of duralumin and were considered to be structural elements of the wing. Each tank was attached to the spar at only two points in order to appropriately accommodate the different elastic properties between wood and duralumin. The supporting bolts used to connect the tanks were themselves supported on the aft side of the spar by collars and guided on the forward side of the spar by a steel plate precisely fitted to their diameter that could slide, and thus provide a degree of articulation between the tank and the spar that accounted for the stresses imposed by the bending of the wing. Additionally, rubber bands were present in between the protective fittings of the spars and the upper and lower edges of the fuel tanks that rested against them. The wing was furnished with relatively large-aspect ailerons that covered the trailing edges of the outer wing sections and were balanced by a pair of auxiliary surfaces or balancers; each aileron was connected with its balancer via a rod and a bell crank.

The floats of the flying boat were somewhat unorthodox in terms of their shape, volume, and disposition of the wing floats. Their large volume of 1.59 m3 (56.15 cu.ft.) made it relatively difficult for large masses of water to submerge them and thus generated disturbances, thus improving manoeuvrability on the water in comparison to conventional designs of the era. They were also positioned relatively close to the hull, which made it easier to simultaneously alight upon them; they were connected to the central section of wing. The vertical empennage comprised a fin and a pair of shield-shaped auxiliary surfaces that could turn about their axes of symmetry during flight and functioned as correctors. The horizontal empennage consisted of a fixed stabilizer that was embedded into the fin and supported by a Y struts; an auxiliary corrector was also provided for the stabilizer, which was actuated via an adjustable bell crank that controlled the elevator and permitted different adjustments of the auxiliary stabilizer in relation to the deflection of the elevator.

The flying boat was typically powered by an arrangement of four engines that were placed relatively high above the wing. The engine bearers, the members of which were composed of sheet duralumin, had a similar assembly method to that of the engine bearers in the hull of a ship; the box-type construction used gave the engine bearers considerable resistance to vibrations across all speeds. An access shaft was provided that permitted total access to the engines even during flight; a mechanic could readily access all of the auxiliary engine components, such as the fuel pumps, water pumps, and magnetos, as well as the engines themselves, which could be uncovered via a sliding top cowling. The oil tanks were located between the engines while the radiators were mounted on the engines forward and aft of the engine bearers. In an emergency situation, fuel could be rapidly emptied within the space of one minute. In addition to the main engines, an auxiliary engine would also be present, which was typically used while the flying boat was waterborne to drive a 1,300 watt generator as well as to start up the primarily engines.

All the flight controls were rigid and mounted on ball bearings; a maximum of two supports were present between any two joints in order to obtain straight shaft lines even in the event of the framework sustaining deformation. Furthermore, the flight controls, piping and apparatus such as the radio generator were accessible by the mechanic during flight so that their condition could be at the very least inspected, if not repaired. For this purpose, various passageways and crawl spaces were present across the flying boat's interior.

== Variants ==
H-24.01
First prototype. Powered by two 373 kW (500 hp) Renault 12Jb engines. One built.
H-241
The initial four-engined long-range heavy-weight variant of the H-24. The hull was almost exclusively made of anodised Duralumin, for corrosion resistance. Although construction began before the H.242, the sole H.241 was completed later, but did not enter production.
H-242
Initial production. Powered by four Gnome-Rhône 7Kd Titan Major radial engines. Two were built for Air France and delivered in December 1933 and February 1934. They could carry ten passengers.
H-242/1
Revised production version, with a modified engine installation. Twelve were built for Air France and delivered between March 1935 and May 1937, carrying twelve passengers. Most H.242/1s were fitted with wide chord NACA cowlings over the front engine only, but some aircraft were fitted with narrow chord Townend rings around the front engine.
H-243
An un-built projected version for the French navy with enlarged hull.
H-244
A projected high-speed inter-continental flying boat for Air Union, abandoned when Air Union was absorbed by Air France.
H-246
A major redesign, the four engines now all in tractor configuration.

== Operators ==
France

- Air France

Italy

- Regia Aeronautica - Captured aircraft.

== Specifications (H-242/1) ==
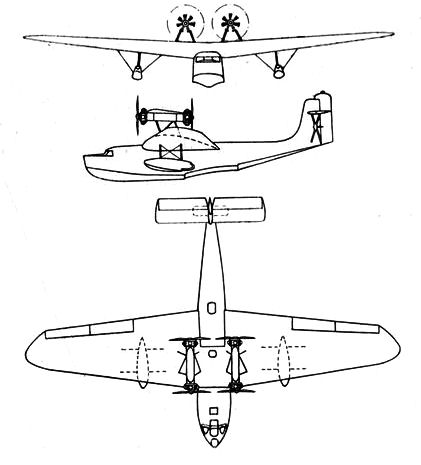
LeO H.242 3-view drawing from L'Aerophile July 1934

Data from The Encyclopedia of World Aircraft,

General characteristics

- Crew: Four
- Capacity: 12 passengers
- Length: 18.45 m (60 ft 6 in)
- Wingspan: 28 m (91 ft 10 in)
- Height: 6.33 m (20 ft 9 in)
- Wing area: 116.25 m^{2} (1,251.3 sq ft)
- Empty weight: 5,868 kg (12,937 lb)
- Max takeoff weight: 8,700 kg (19,180 lb)
- Powerplant: 4 × Gnome-Rhône 7Kd Titan Major seven-cylinder air-cooled radial piston engines, 261 kW (350 hp) each
- Propellers: 2-bladed variable-pitch propellers

Performance

- Maximum speed: 240 km/h (150 mph, 130 kn)
- Range: 1,100 km (680 mi, 590 nmi)
- Service ceiling: 4,500 m (14,800 ft)
- Time to altitude: 1,000 m (3,300 ft) in six minutes and 50 seconds

== See also ==
- Lioré et Olivier LeO H-246
