= SET 7 =

Romanian trainer/reconnaissance aircraft

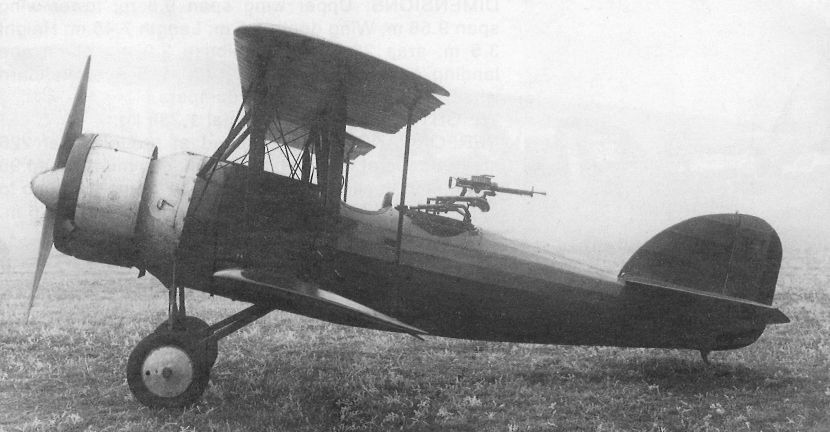
- SET-7K

General information
- Type: Trainer and reconnaissance aircraft
- Manufacturer: SET
- Designer: Grigore Zamfirescu; Dumitru Bazilu; Ștefan Protopopescu
- Number built: 123

History
- First flight: 1931

The SET 7 was a military trainer & reconnaissance aircraft that was produced in Romania in the mid-1930s. It was originally designed as a conventional single-bay biplane, with slightly staggered wings, a standard undercarriage with fixed tailskid, and a tandem open-cockpit arrangement for the pilot and instructor or observer. Power was supplied by an Armstrong Siddeley Jaguar radial engine, and, from the outset, the aircraft was equipped for wireless & photographic reconnaissance duties.

An armed version followed in 1934, adding a trainable machine gun for the observer and a fixed machine gun for the pilot. This version, the 7K, was powered by a neatly cowled Gnome-Rhône 7Ksd engine, and the 7KB (fitted with bomb racks) & 7KD were specialised subtypes that followed it. A floatplane version was produced as the 7H.

== Variants ==
- SET 7 - initial unarmed trainer version with Armstrong Siddeley Jaguar engine (50 built, 1932–1934)
- SET 7K - armed reconnaissance version with Gnome-Rhône 7Ksd/7Ksf engine (20 built, delivered by August 1936)
  - SET 7KB - 7K fitted with IAR-built Barbieri-type bomb racks (20 built, delivered by September 1937)
  - SET 7KD - 7K stripped of most equipment and used for liaison duties (Divizionar - "army division use") (20 built, delivered between October and December 1938)
- SET 7H - floatplane for Romanian Navy

== Operators ==
Romania

- Royal Romanian Air Force
- Royal Romanian Navy
- Transnistrian air section

== Specifications (7K) ==
Data from Jane's all the World's Aircraft 1937, Romanian Aeronautical Constructions 1905–1974

General characteristics

- Crew: 2
- Length: 7.15 m (23 ft 5 in)
- Upper wingspan: 9.8 m (32 ft 2 in)
- Lower wingspan: 9.5 m (31 ft 2 in)
- Height: 3.15 m (10 ft 4 in)
- Wing area: 26.6 m^{2} (286 sq ft)
- Empty weight: 930 kg (2,050 lb)
- Gross weight: 1,560 kg (3,439 lb)
- Powerplant: 1 × IAR-built Gnome-Rhône 7Ksf 7-cylinder air-cooled radial piston engine, 300 kW (400 hp) at 1,500 m (4,900 ft)

Performance

- Maximum speed: 251 km/h (156 mph, 136 kn) at sea level

255 km/h (158 mph; 138 kn) at 1,500 m (4,900 ft)
253 km/h (157 mph; 137 kn) at 3,000 m (9,800 ft)

- Stall speed: 92 km/h (57 mph, 50 kn)
- Service ceiling: 6,800 m (22,300 ft) service ceiling; 7,500 m (24,600 ft) absolute ceiling
- Time to altitude: 1,000 m (3,300 ft) in 2 minutes 40 seconds

2,000 m (6,600 ft) in 5 minutes 40 seconds
3,000 m (9,800 ft) in 9 minutes 5 seconds
4,000 m (13,000 ft) in 13 minutes 41 seconds
5,000 m (16,000 ft) in 19 minutes 41 seconds

Armament

- Guns: 1x fixed forward-firing synchronised 7.70 mm (0.303 in) Lewis gun with twin 7.70 mm (0.303 in) Lewis guns on a Grossu IAR ring mount in the rear cockpit
- Bombs: 300 kg (660 lb) of bombs and/or Holt flares carried under-wing
