= Fleet 50 Freighter =

1930s Canadian transport aircraft

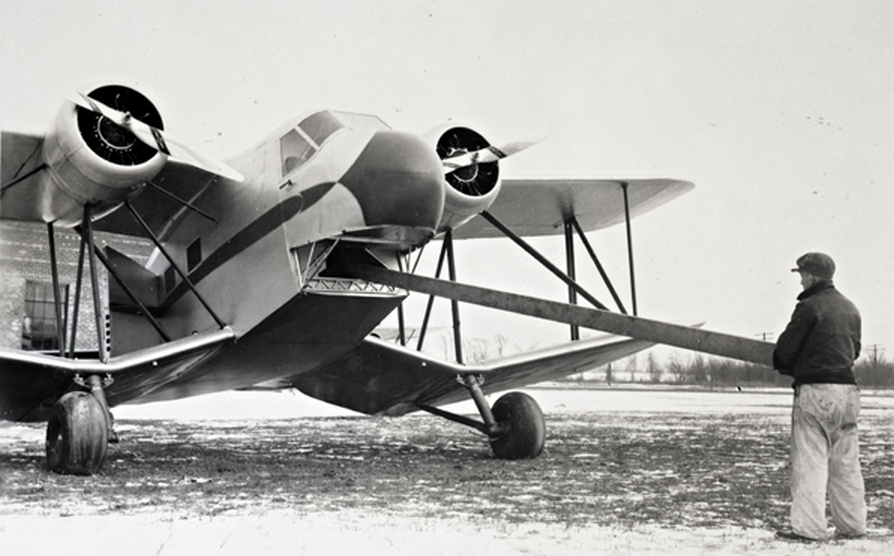

General information
- Type: General utility aircraft
- Manufacturer: Fleet Aircraft
- Number built: 5

History
- First flight: 22 February 1938

The Fleet 50 Freighter was a Canadian twin-engine biplane general utility aircraft designed and built by Fleet Aircraft. This peculiar-looking aircraft had promise as a freighter and general use aircraft, but it was underpowered and only five were built.

== Development ==
Design was started in 1936 to create a general purpose twin-engined utility aircraft for the Canadian market. It was designed as a short take-off freighter with features added to ease cargo handling. The Freighter was a biplane with the lower wing an inverted gull wing with either a float or wheel landing gear. Two radial piston engines were mounted in nacelles on the upper wing panels.

The fuselage structure was welded steel tubing with duralumin formers, and a semi-monocoque duralumin nose section. The wings were stressed-skin metal structure on the inboard panels and fabric-covered wood beams and duralumin ribs on the outboard panels. The fuselage had room for two crew and up to ten passengers. Large doors and a roof-mounted chain hoist were fitted for use in the cargo role.

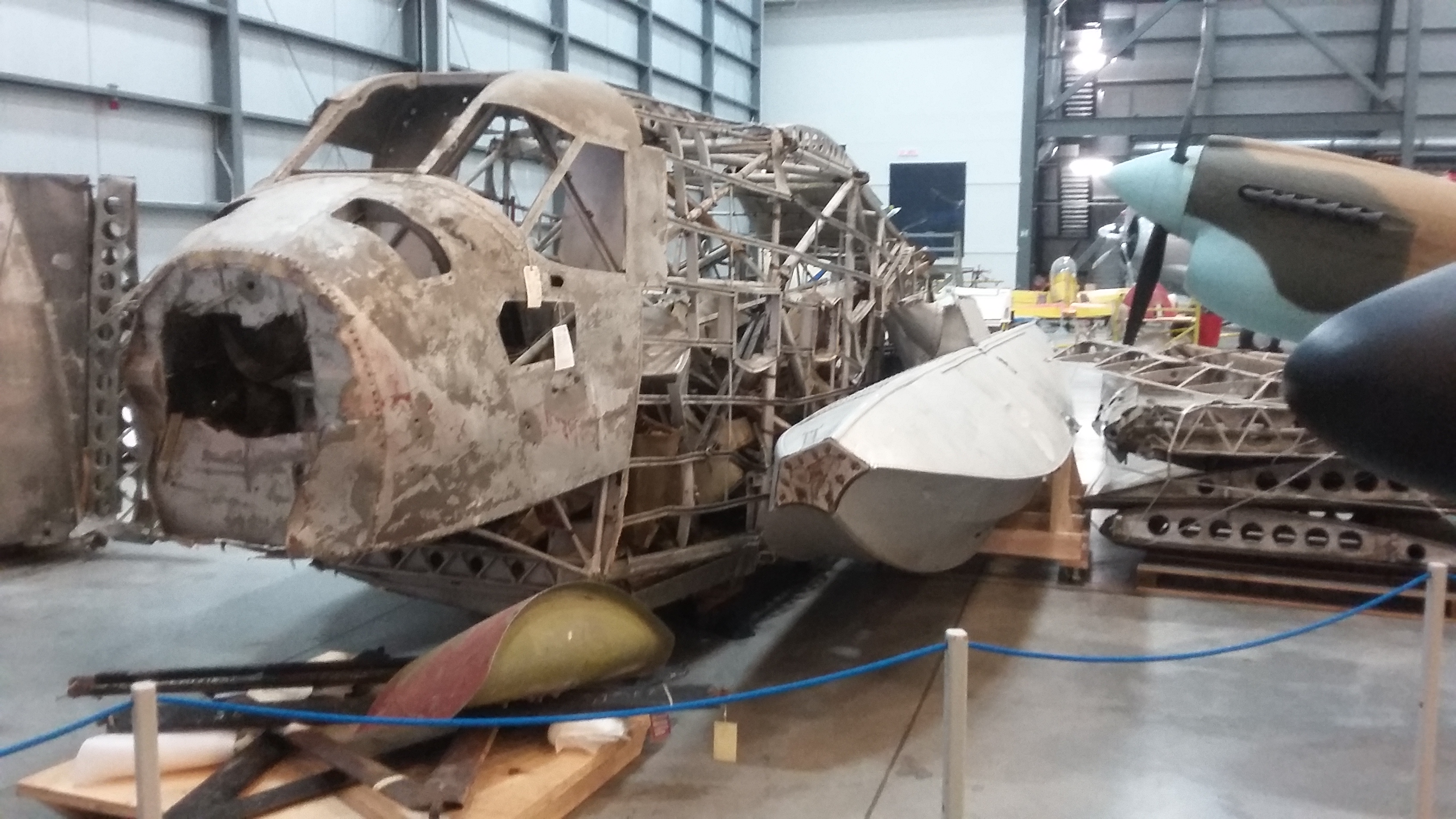
Surviving example at the Canada Aviation and Space Museum

The prototype designated the 50J first flew on 22 February 1938, powered by two 285 hp (213 kW) Jacobs L-5MB 7-cylinder radial engines. It was later re-engined with 330 hp Jacobs L-6MB engines and re-designated the 50K. A further four aircraft were built, all with L-6MB engines.

None of the aircraft was operated for long, as the design was underpowered and could not maintain altitude on only one engine. The last aircraft went out of service in 1946. The remains of one airframe are held by the Canada Aviation and Space Museum.

== Specifications (50K landplane) ==
Data from The Illustrated Encyclopedia of Aircraft (Part Work 1982-1985), 1985, Orbis Publishing, Page 1817

General characteristics

- Crew: 2
- Capacity: 10 passengers or freight
- Length: 36 ft 0 in (10.97 m)
- Wingspan: 45 ft 0 in (13.72 m)
- Height: 13 ft 1 in (3.99 m)
- Wing area: 528 sq ft (49.05 m^{2})
- Empty weight: 4,600 lb (2,087 kg)
- Gross weight: 8,326 lb (3,777 kg)
- Powerplant: 2 × Jacobs L-6MB 7-cylinder radial engine , 330 hp (246 kW) each

Performance

- Maximum speed: 150 mph (241 km/h, 130 kn)
- Range: 650 mi (1,046 km, 560 nmi)
- Service ceiling: 15,000 ft (4,570 m)
