= Aeroclub of Lithuania =

Lithuanian aviation association

Aeroclub of Lithuania (Lith. Lietuvos aeroklubas, abbreviated as LAK) is the national association of Lithuania’s civil aviation federations and air clubs. LAK, established in 1927 and re-established in 1989, it is one of the oldest non-governmental organisations of Lithuania.

== History ==
Aeroclub of Lithuania was established on April 28, 1927, in Kaunas, then a provisional capital of Lithuania. Among the founders of the Air Club were country's president Antanas Smetona, commander of armed forces general Silverstras Žukauskas, opera singer Kipras Petrauskas, industrial tycoon Jonas Vailiokaitis. One of the key promoters of the establishment of the national air club and also its founder was Steponas Darius, a military pilot, active promoter of sports, latter a trans-Atlantic pilot.

LAK's goals included promotion of civil aviation as well as pilot's training. First four civil pilots were trained in 1930, first glider's pilots – in 1932. In 1933 LAK has established its own gliding school in Nida. In January 1935, LAK Sports Squadron was formed of civil pilots and technicians. Since 1936 it was sponsored by Military Aviation, as most of civil pilots could not afford to pay for 20–40 training flight hours per year. Further to its basis in Kaunas, by 1940, the LAK had its pilots’ training sections in Biržai. Panevėžys, Ukmergė and Zarasai. Training of skydivers was started in 1929, of acrobatic pilots – in 1932, air modelling – in 1934.

LAK was actively promoting the establishment of national civil aviation agency – an Aerial Communication Inspection under the Ministry of Communication (Lith. Oro susisiekimo inspekcija prie Susisiekimo ministerijos), established in 1935. In 1939 the aerial ambulance services were launched in cooperation with the Red Cross Society of Lithuania and a dedicated aircraft (Farman F.393) was acquired.

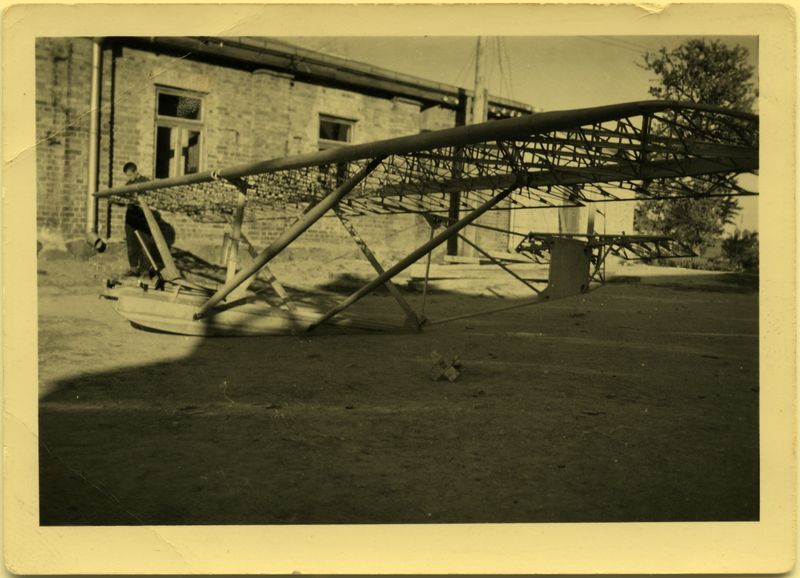
T-1 (BrO-1) – first Lithuanian glider, construction of which was supported by LAK. 1932.

In early 1930s LAK supported the acquisition of gliders (starting from A.Lippisch's RRG 23 „Zögling") and subsequent localisation of its production in Lithuania (starting from Bronius Oškinis' T-1 (BrO-1) as well as latter constructions by B. Oškinis, Balys Karvelis, A. Paknys, A. Gysas, Z. Rimša, V. Šalavėjus). Gregorius Radvenis-Heidrikis, the first Lithuanian glider's instructor, got his license under LAK sponsorship in Rossiten gliding school in 1931. First trainings took place in Pažaislis, near Kaunas, after 1932 the school was moved to Nida, after annexation of Klaipėda by the Nazi Germany and the return of Vilnius to Lithuania – to Aukštagiris.

As of 1939 the LAK had 51 civil pilot as its members.

In 1935, LAK started publishing "Lietuvos sparnai" – own monthly magazine (closed in 1940 by the Soviet occupation authorities).

In 1937, LAK organized first civil national aviation festival (earlier such events were organized by the military), in 1938 – aviation sports competition during National Olympics, in 1939 – first air sport competition of the Baltic States.

In 1931, LAK has joined FAI (fr. Fédération aéronautique internationale).

=== Aircraft ===
By 1940 LAK had 10 fixed wing airplanes, 21 glider, 1 rotorcraft.

The first aircraft of LAK was an Albatros B.II, transferred from the Lithuanian Air Force (Karo aviacija) in August 1929. By 1940 13 more aircraft (ANBO-II (August 1931), DH-60G Gipsy Moth (1933 and April 8, 1937), Letov Š.18 (1934), two ex-Air Force Albatros C.Ib (February 1935), autogyro C.30A (May 1935), four-seater Caudron C.280 Phalene (March 17, 1936), DH-82 Tiger Moth (May 12, 1936), Taylor Cub (October 24, 1937), Bücker Bü 133 Jungmeister (June 15, 1938), Bücker Bü 131 Jungmann (April 1939), Farman F.393 (July 12, 1939)) and over 40 gliders were acquired.

=== Soviet occupation and disestablishment ===
With the Soviet occupation and subsequent annexation of Lithuania, the civil flights were banned and the Aeroclub of Lithuania was disbanded. Soviet authorities took over all LAK aircraft, however due to the lack of spare part most of them were kept in storage. Gliders' pilots training was allowed and this activity was moved into Aukštagiris Flight School near Vilnius. There were some attempts to revive civil gliders flights under German occupation in 1942, however with little success.

With the return of Soviet occupation in 1944–1945, the aviation sport was controlled by OSOAVIACHIM and later – by the DOSSAF. Aiming to bypass the supervision of those heavily militarized organisations, Lithuanian aviation enthusiasts found a legal way to establish public air club of Lithuania. In April 1958 a social (meaning – non-institutional) Aeroclub of Lithuania was re-established and Bronius Oškinis, a prominent gliders’ designer, was elected its chairman. The same year, on the basis of Social Aeroclub of Lithuania, an Aviation Sport Federation of Lithuanian SSR (Lith. Lietuvos TSR Aviacijos sporto federacija (LASF)) was established (chair – Anatolijus Speičys, secretary – Zenonas Brazauskas). LASF structure included section of sailplanes, parachutes, avia models and aircraft sports. By 1985 those sections have developed into separate air sport federations. In late 1970's several Children Flight Schools were established by the local air clubs, providing basic glider trainings for 9–12-year-old children, using LAK-16s.

LAK was active in promoting of gliders' construction – a series of A. Paknys, A. Gysas, Br. Oškinis and B. Karvelis constructions, (Bk-1, BK-2, BK-3, BK-4, BK-6, BK-7, BrO-9, BrO-10, BrO-11, etc., later produced under the brand "LAK" (Lithuanian Aerial Construction – Lith. Lietuviška aviacinė konstrukcija)) were developed in Lithuania. However, under the instruction of Soviet authorities their production took place in Simferopil, Ukraine. Part of the production was relocated to Lithuania after the establishment of ESAG (Lith. Eksperimentinė sportinės aviacijos gamykla) in 1969.

In 1968, LASF started publishing own magazine „Sparnai" (En. „Wings"). In 1991, the magazine was renamed „Lietuvos sparnai" and published until 2003.

=== Re-establishment ===
In 1989 by the decision of Lithuanian DOSSAF section and LASF, the Aeroclub of Lithuania was re-established. in 1994 separate Children Flight Schools were united into single B. Oškinis Children Flight School.

LAK was re-admitted in to FAI in its September 16–17, 1992 Athens conference.

== International air sports competitions ==
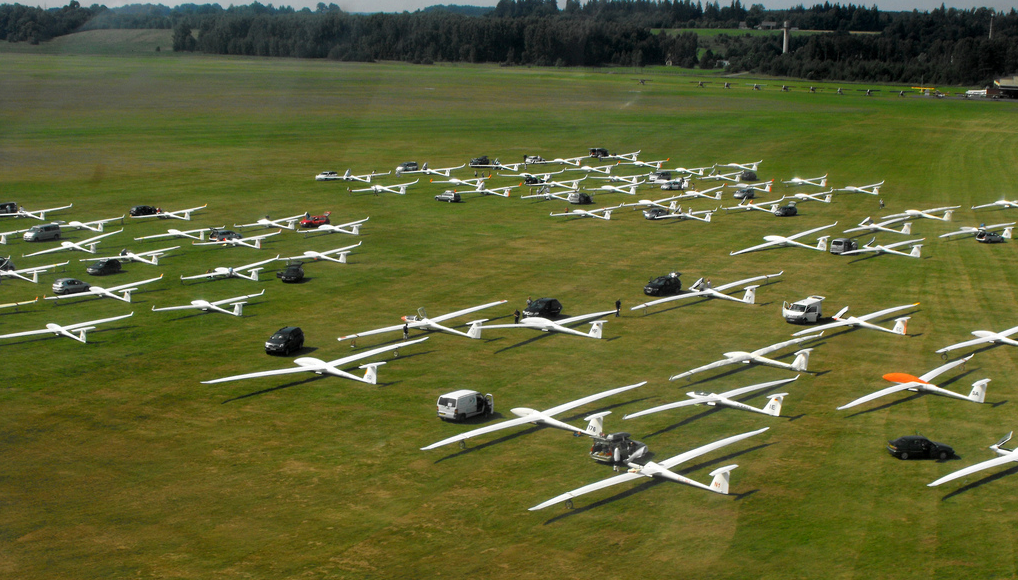
Gliders at Pociūnai airfield

The official re-establishment of Aeroclub of Lithuania marked the beginning various international aviation competitions, held in Lithuania. Starting from first international hot air balloon festival, organized on May 26–29, 1989, in still Soviet-held Lithuania, and gathering over 30 international participants, several international air sport competitions are taking place annually. Some of those events include:

- 2001 – First World Women Gliding Championship (Pociūnai)
- 2002 – European Aerobatics Championship (Paįstrys)
- 2003 – European Hot Air Balloon Championship (Vilnius)
- 2004, 2007, 2009, 2011 – European Gliding Championship (Pociūnai)
- 2015, 2016 – World Gliding Championship (Pociūnai)
- 2017 – Junior World Gliding Championship (Pociūnai)
- 2022 – European Gliding Championship and World Gliding Championship (Pociūnai)

== Structure ==
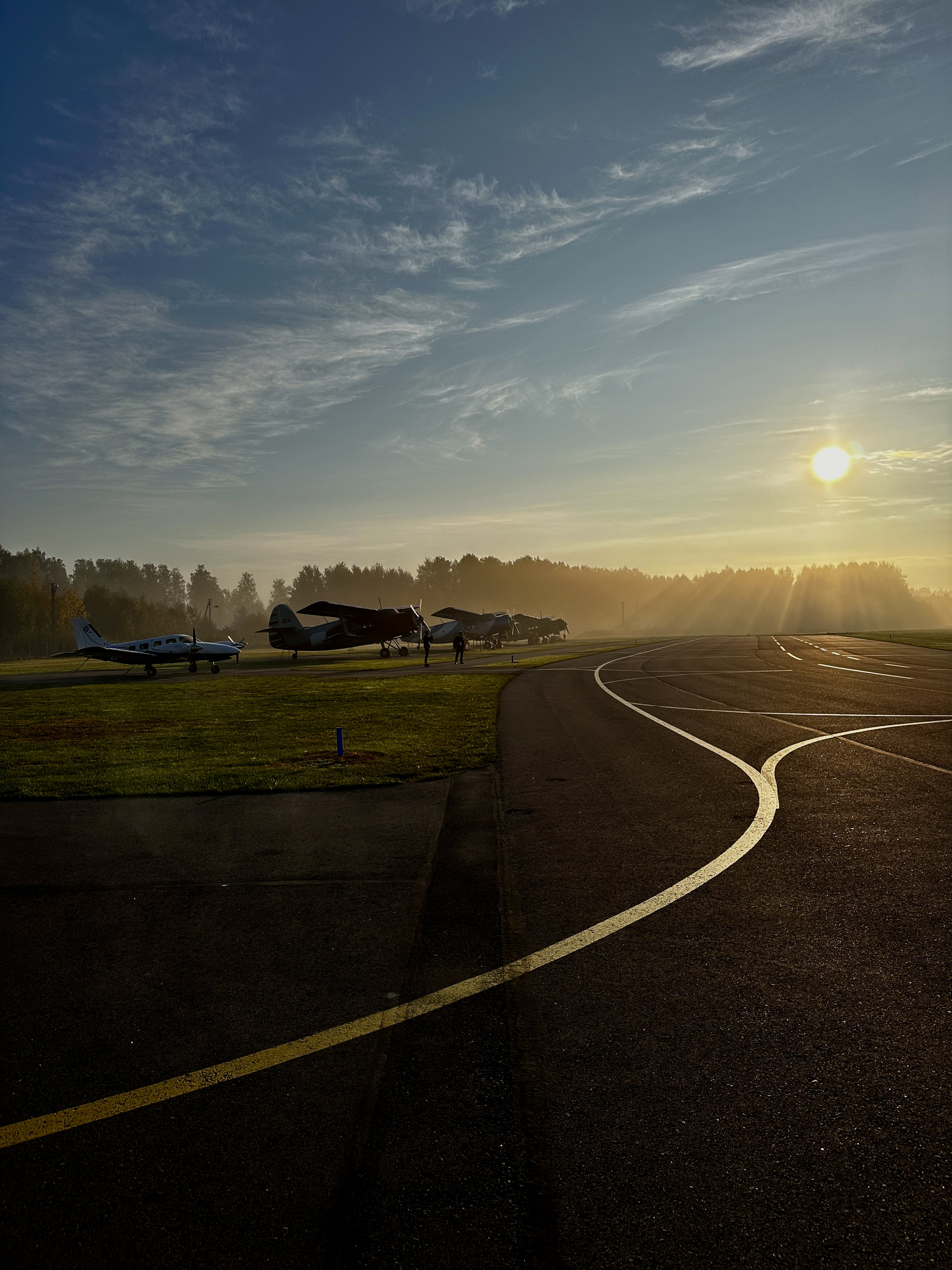
Several member organisations are based at Kyviškės Airfield in Vilnius, Lithuania

As of 2022 Aeroclub of Lithuania is composed of the following organisations:

- Lithuanian Aerobatics Federation
- Lithuanian Gliders Aerobatics Federation
- Lithuanian Air Modelling Sport Federation
- Lithuanian General Aviation Sport Federation
- Lithuanian Hot Air Balloon Pilots’ Federation
- Lithuanian Skydiving Federation
- Lithuanian Gliding Sport Federation
- Lithuanian Paragliders and Hang-Gliders Sport Federation
- Lithuanian Federation of Ultra-Light Aircraft Pilots
- Lithuanian Federation of Aircraft Designers
- Lithuanian Federation of Ancient Aircraft
- Lithuanian Association of Children Gliding Sports
- Lithuanian Aviation Veterans’ Association

== Presidents of LAK ==
(Chairmen by 1989)

- general Silvestras Žukauskas – 1927–1928
- Zigmas Žemaitis – 1929–1940
- Bronius Oškinis – 1958
- Anatolijus Speičys – 1958–1967
- Donatas Kostiukevičius – 1967–1978
- Antanas Karpavičius – 1978–1990
- Klemas Inta – 1990–1992
- Antanas Unikauskas – 1992–1993
- Jurgis Stanaitis – 1993–2001
- Stasys Murza – 2001–2008
- Vitas Karčiauskas – 2008–2011
- Jonas Mažintas – 2011–2016
- Gintaras Kalinauskas – 2016–2018
- Mindaugas Sinkevičius – 2018–2020
- Eglė Paužuolienė – 2020–2021
- Ignas Stankovičius – 2021–2022
- Arūnas Gražulis – 2022–present
