= Gregorius Radvenis =

Lithuanian Air Force Captain Gregorius Radvenis

Gregorius Radvenis or Gregorius Heidrikis, first name also Gregor (November 11, 1903 in Parausiai estate, Vilkaviškis county – December 26, 1989, in Los Angeles, California) was a squadron commander in the Lithuanian Air Force. He achieved the rank of captain in 1936. He became a qualified glider pilot pioneering and promoting gliding in Lithuania and holding the first gliding records in Lithuania. He managed and taught at gliding schools.

== Biography ==
On November 22, 1922, Radvenis enlisted as a volunteer in the Lithuanian Army, where he was assigned as an air force mechanic. On May 9, 1923, he joined a pilot training group. On June 30, 1925, he completed the Air Force officers' school and on September 1, he was commissioned to the rank of junior lieutenant.

In 1931, he went to the town of Rossitten (Lithuanian: Rasytė) on the Curonian Spit. Here he attended a German gliding school and became the first qualified category "C" glider pilot of Lithuania. In 1932 he served as a gliding instructor at the gliding school of Pažaislis.

In 1933, the Aero Club of Lithuania invited him to lead the establishment of the gliding school in Nida on the Curonian Spit. He received a vacation pass from the Air Force and on August 30 he traveled to Nida to take up his new duties. He supervised the construction of a hangar and taught gliding theory and practice. He accomplished the first long flights himself and thus held the initial Lithuanian record of 3 hours and 10 minutes in the air. On June 26, 1934, he improved his personal record to 5 hours and 15 minutes.

In further service in the Lithuanian Air Force, besides the occasional gliding instructor assignments, his duties included management of the aircraft repair shop in Zuokniai (at the Šiauliai military airfield) and intermittent squadron commander. In 1936, he was promoted to the rank of Air Force captain.

On May 29, 1940, upon the occupation of Lithuania by the Soviet Union, he was retired to the Lithuanian military reserve. During World War II he served in German air force. Upon the impending second Soviet occupation of Lithuania he fled to Germany and ended up in a displaced persons camp in Hanau. In 1952 he emigrated to the United States and worked in an aircraft parts manufacturing shop in Los Angeles.
