= Gnome-Rhône 7K =

7K
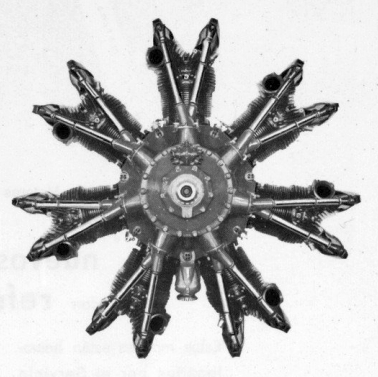
- Type: Radial engine
- Manufacturer: Gnome et Rhône

The Gnome-Rhône 7K Titan Major was a seven-cylinder 370 hp (270 kW) air-cooled radial engine, that started life as an enlarged Gnome-Rhône 5K with two extra cylinders.

== Development ==
The Gnome-Rhône 5K was itself a licensed version of the Bristol Titan. The 7K is very comparable to the Bristol Neptune seven-cylinder engine since they used the same technology. The 7K was followed by the larger and more powerful nine-cylinder 550 hp (405 kW) Gnome-Rhône 9K Mistral. Gnome-Rhône later responded to the need for a more powerful engine by developing the 7K into a two-row version that became the Gnome-Rhône14K Mistral Major.

== Variants ==
IAM K7
Licence production in Yugoslavia by Industrija Aeroplanskih Motora- Rakovica (IAM).
IAR 7K
Licence production in Romania by Industria Aeronautică Română (IAR).

== Applications ==
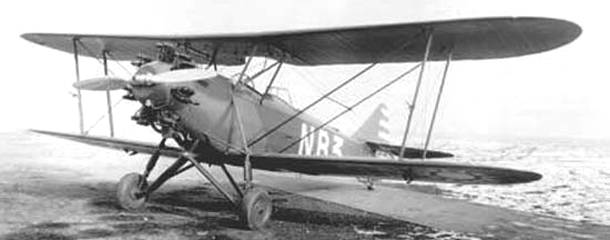
A Nationalist China Breda Ba.28, powered by a Piaggio-built Gnome-Rhône 7K

- Bernard 160
- Breda Ba.25
- Breguet 393T
- Breguet 414
- FBA 291
- FBA 294
- Lioré et Olivier LeO H-199
- Lioré et Olivier LeO 203
- Lioré et Olivier LeO H-242
- Morane-Saulnier MS.235
- Potez 33/3
- Rogožarski PVT
- Rogožarski R-100
- SET 7
- SPCA 80
- SPCA 90
- Wibault 280
- Wibault 362

== Specifications (7Kd) ==
Data from

=== General characteristics ===
- Type: Seven-cylinder air-cooled radial engine.
- Bore: 146 mm (5.75 in)
- Stroke: 165 mm (6.50 in)
- Displacement: 19.3 L (1,180 cu in)
- Length: 146 mm (5.75 in)
- Diameter: 1,235 mm (48.62 in)
- Dry weight: 270 kg (600 lb)

=== Components ===
- Valvetrain: Pushrod operated overhead valves, two per cylinder
- Supercharger: (7Ksd - single speed centrifugal blower)
- Fuel system: Carburetor
- Fuel type: Gasoline
- Cooling system: Air-cooled

=== Performance ===
- Power output: 7Kd - 260 kW (350 hp) at 2,000 rpm at sea level for take-off
  7Ksd - 272 kW (365 hp) at 2,000 rpm at 1,500 m (4,900 ft)
  7Ksd - 250 kW (340 hp) at 2,000 rpm at 4,000 m (13,000 ft)
- Compression ratio: 5.5:1

== See also ==
Related development

- Bristol Neptune
- Piaggio Stella P.VII

Comparable engines

- Armstrong Siddeley Cheetah
- Armstrong Siddeley Lynx
- Jacobs R-915

Related lists

- List of aircraft engines
