= FBA 290 =

FBA Model 290
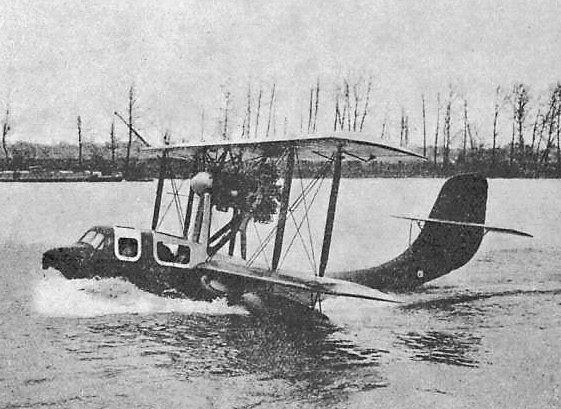

General information
- Type: four-seat amphibian flying-boat
- Manufacturer: Franco-British Aviation Company
- Primary user: French Navy
- Number built: 10

History
- First flight: 1931

The Franco-British Aviation Model 290 was a French four-seat amphibian flying boat built by the Franco-British Aviation Company (FBA) as a replacement for the Model 17 in French naval service.

== Development ==
The FBA Company was requested to design a successor to the Model 17 in the liaison and training role. The company used the experience gained in the Model 270 and 271 and produced the Model 290. The Model 290 was a biplane amphibian with a single radial engine driving a pusher propeller. It had room for four persons in the forward part of the hull. The Model 290 flew for the first time in April 1931 powered by a 300 hp (224 kW) Lorraine engine. A further example, the Model 291, was built with a Gnome-Rhône radial engine.

The French Navy was looking for a VIP transport and ordered eight aircraft based on the Model 291 and designated the Model 293 (with a Lorraine engine) and the Model 294 (with a Gnome-Rhône engine). The navy aircraft were used as executive transports and based at the major French naval air stations.

== Variants ==
Model 290
Prototype with a 296hp (221kW) Lorraine 9Na radial engine, one built.
Model 291
Prototype with a 296hp (221kW) Gnome & Rhône 7Kb radial engine, one built.
Model 293
Production aircraft for the French Navy with a 296hp (221kW) Lorraine 9Na Algol radial engine, six built.
Model 294
Production aircraft for the French Navy with a 296hp (221kW) Gnome-Rhône 7Kb engine, two built.

== Operators ==
France

- French Navy

== Specifications (Model 293) ==
Data from The Illustrated Encyclopedia of Aircraft (Part Work 1982–1985), 1985, Orbis Publishing, Page 1633

General characteristics

- Crew: One
- Capacity: Three passengers
- Length: 31 ft 0.75 in (9.47 m)
- Wingspan: 42 ft 11.75 in (13.10 m)
- Height: 13 ft 3 in (4.04 m)
- Wing area: 432.19 sq ft (40.15 m^{2})
- Empty weight: 2,866 lb (1,300 kg)
- Gross weight: 4,360 lb (2,100 kg)
- Powerplant: 1 × Lorraine 9Na Algol 9-cylinder radial piston engine , 300 hp (224 kW)

Performance

- Maximum speed: 109 mph (176 km/h, 95 kn)
- Range: 326 mi (525 km, 283 nmi)
- Service ceiling: 13,120 ft (4,000 m)

== See also ==
Related lists

- List of Interwar military aircraft
- List of flying boats and floatplanes
