= Bristol Neptune =

1930s British piston aircraft engine

Neptune
- The Bristol Neptune
- Type: Radial aircraft engine
- Manufacturer: Bristol Aeroplane Company
- First run: 1930
- Major applications: Bristol Type 110
- Developed from: Bristol Titan

The Bristol Neptune was a seven-cylinder air-cooled radial engine developed in 1930. It had the same size cylinders as the earlier Mercury and Titan engines, 5.75 in (146 mm) x 6.5 in (165 mm) which gave a displacement of 1,182 cu in (19.3 L) and produced a maximum of 320 horsepower (239 kW). The Neptune was effectively a seven-cylinder version of the Titan.

== Applications ==
- Bristol Type 110

== Specifications (Neptune I) ==
Data from Lumsden.

=== General characteristics ===
- Type: 7-cylinder air-cooled radial engine.
- Bore: 5.75 in (146 mm)
- Stroke: 6.5 in (165 mm)
- Displacement: 1,182 cu in (19.3 L)
- Diameter: 48.4 in (1229.3 mm)
- Dry weight: 630 lb (286 kg)
- Designer: Roy Fedden

=== Components ===
- Valvetrain: Overhead valve, Four valves per cylinder
- Fuel type: 73-77 octane petrol
- Cooling system: Air-cooled
- Reduction gear: Direct drive, left hand tractor

=== Performance ===
- Power output: 295 hp (220 kW) at 1,700 rpm (rated power), 320 hp (239 kW) at 1,870 rpm at sea level
- Compression ratio: 5:1
- Power-to-weight ratio: 0.5 hp/lb (0.83 kW/kg)

== See also ==
Related development

- Bristol Mercury
- Bristol Titan

Comparable engines

- Armstrong Siddeley Cheetah
- Armstrong Siddeley Lynx
- Avia Rk.17
- Gnome-Rhône 7K
- Jacobs R-915
- Piaggio Stella P.VII

Related lists

- List of aircraft engines
