= Bristol Lucifer =

1910s British piston aircraft engine

Lucifer
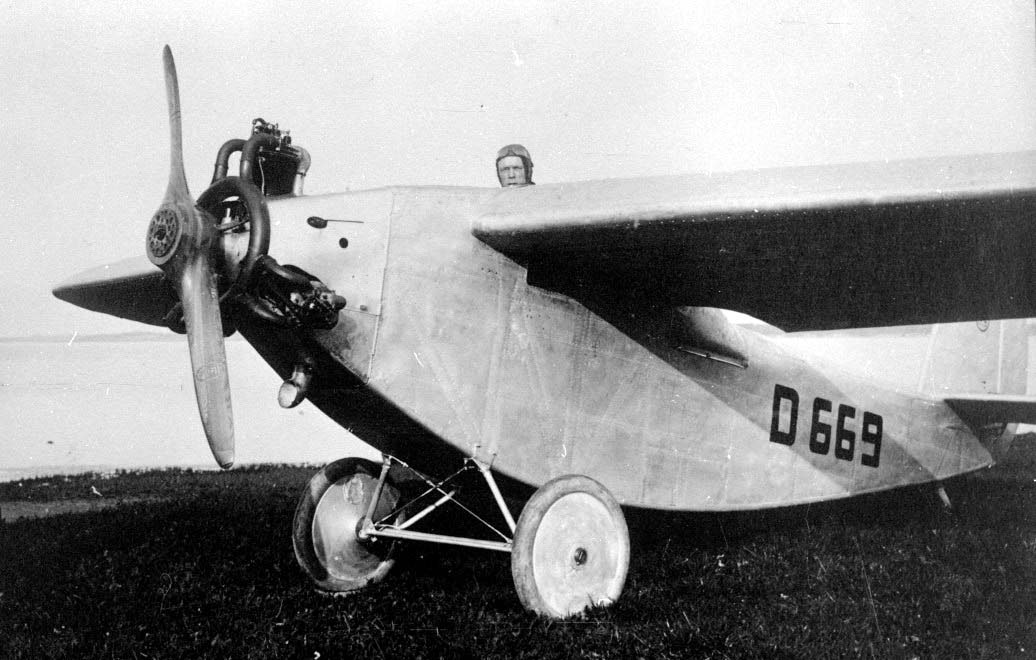
- Bristol Lucifer, installed in LFG V 44 D-669
- Type: Piston aero engine
- Manufacturer: Bristol Aeroplane Company
- First run: 1919
- Major applications: Avro 504

The Bristol Lucifer is a British three-cylinder, air-cooled, radial engine for aircraft. Built in the UK in the 1920s by the Bristol Aeroplane Company, it produced 100 horsepower (75 kW).

The Lucifer was originally a Cosmos Engineering engine, Cosmos being taken over by Bristol in 1920.

== Applications ==
- Albatros L 69
- Avro 504
- Boulton Paul P.10
- Bristol M.1D
- Bristol Primary Trainer
- Bryant 1927 monoplane (Dole Race entrant, christened Angel of Los Angeles)
- Handley Page Hamlet
- LFG V 44
- NVI F.K.29
- Parnall Peto
- Tupolev ANT-2
- Udet U 8

== Specifications (Lucifer 1) ==
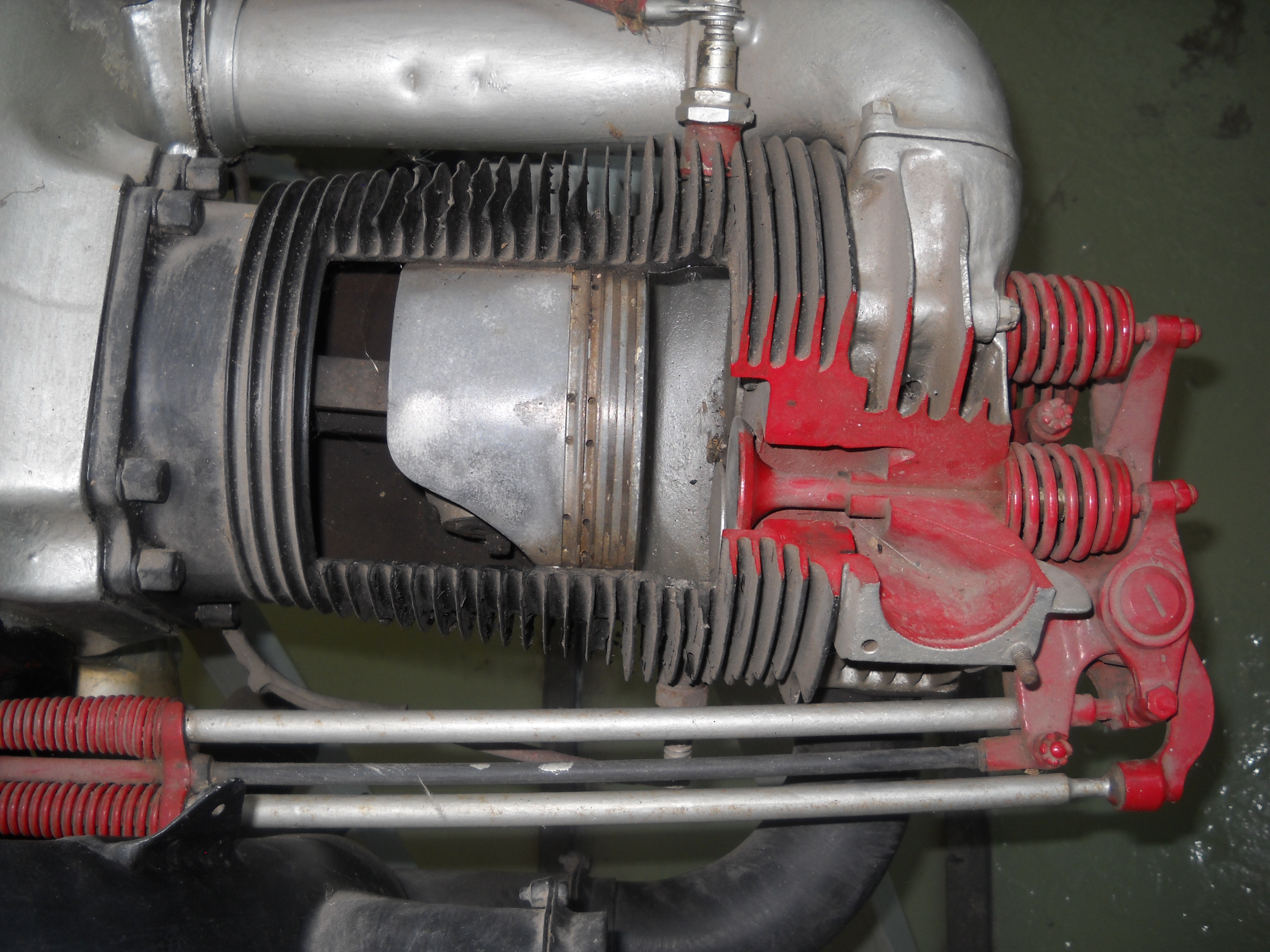
Bristol Lucifer, view of sectioned cylinder.

Data from Lumsden

=== General characteristics ===
- Type: 3-cylinder air-cooled single-row radial engine
- Bore: 5.75 in (146 mm)
- Stroke: 6.25 in (159 mm)
- Displacement: 487 in³ (8.0 L)
- Diameter: 48 in (1,219 mm)
- Dry weight: 324 lb (147 kg)

=== Components ===
- Valvetrain: Four valves per cylinder, poppet valve
- Fuel type: Petrol
- Cooling system: Air-cooled

=== Performance ===
- Power output: 100 hp (75 kW)
- Compression ratio: 4.8:1
- Power-to-weight ratio: 0.3 hp/lb (0.5 kW/kg)

== See also ==
Comparable engines

- Blackburne Thrush

Related lists

- List of aircraft engines
