= Bristol Primary Trainer =

Primary Trainer
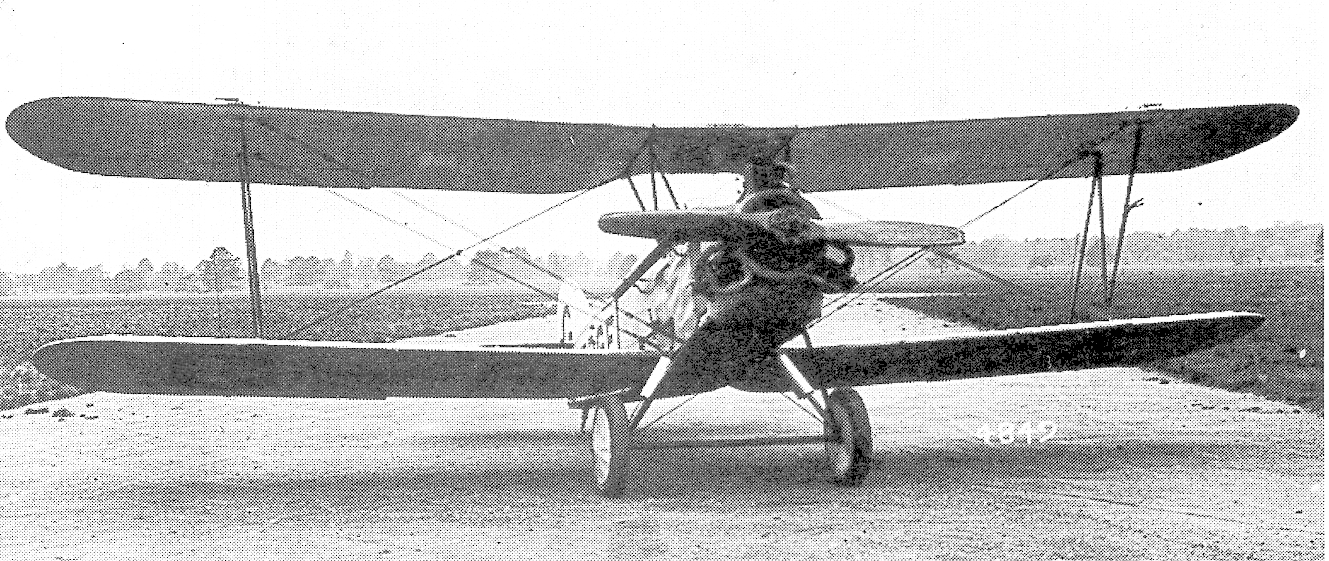

General information
- Type: Trainer
- Manufacturer: Bristol Aeroplane Company
- Primary users: Chile United Kingdom; Hungary; Bulgaria
- Number built: 28

History
- Introduction date: 1923
- First flight: 1923
- Retired: 1933

The Bristol Taxiplane and Bristol Primary Trainer were British single-engine biplane light aircraft built by the Bristol Aeroplane Company in the early 1920s. A total of 28 were built, being mainly used as trainers.

== Design and development ==
In 1922, the Bristol Aeroplane Company developed a pair of related light aircraft designs, powered by the Bristol Lucifer three-cylinder radial engine, the Type 73 Taxiplane, a three-seat light utility aircraft and tourer, and the Type 83 Primary Trainer, a two-seat trainer intended for use for primary training at Reserve Flying Schools.

The Taxiplane was constructed of wood with fabric covering, and was fitted with single-bay biplane wings. It carried two passengers side by side in a cockpit behind the pilot. The first Taxiplane, registered G-EBEW, flew on 13 February 1923, but could be certificated only as a two-seater, being overweight with two passengers and a pilot. Only two more Taxiplanes were built.

The Primary Trainer, also known as the Bristol Lucifer used the same wings, tail and undercarriage as the Taxiplane, but with a new, narrower fuselage containing two tandem cockpits. The Primary Trainer showed better performance owing to its slimmer fuselage and lower weight, and was more successful, 24 being built.

A further aircraft, the Bristol Type 83E, was built as a testbed for development of the five-cylinder Bristol Titan radial engine.

== Operational history ==
The first six Primary Trainers entered service with the Reserve Flying School at Filton in July 1923, continuing in service until December 1931, when they were replaced by de Havilland Moths. One of the surviving aircraft was modified as a three-seater and was used for sightseeing. It was scrapped in December 1933.

The remainder of the Type 83s were produced for export, with twelve being sold to Chile, five to Hungary and one to Bulgaria, all in 1926.

== Variants ==
Type 73 Taxiplane
Three-seat light aircraft. Powered by 100 hp (80 kW) Bristol Lucifer engine, three built.

Type 83 Primary Trainer
Two-seat tandem trainer, 24 built.

Type 83E
Testbed for 250 hp (190 kW) Bristol Titan engine, one built.

== Operators ==
Bulgaria

- Bulgarian Air Force received one aircraft.

Chile

- Chilean Air Force received 12 aircraft.

Hungary

- Hungarian Air Force received five aircraft.

United Kingdom

- Filton Reserve Flying School

== Specifications (Type 83) ==
Data from Bristol Aircraft Since 1910.

General characteristics

- Crew: 2
- Length: 24 ft 4 in (7.42 m)
- Wingspan: 31 ft 1 in (9.47 m)
- Height: 8 ft 10 in (2.69 m)
- Wing area: 284 sq ft (26.4 m^{2})
- Empty weight: 1,340 lb (608 kg)
- Gross weight: 1,900 lb (862 kg)
- Powerplant: 1 × Bristol Lucifer 3-cylinder air-cooled radial piston engine, 120–140 hp (89–104 kW)
- Propellers: 2-bladed fixed-pitch propeller

Performance

- Maximum speed: 96 mph (154 km/h, 83 kn)
- Wing loading: 6.69 lb/sq ft (32.7 kg/m^{2})
