= Bristol Type 110A =

Single-engine biplane

Type 110A
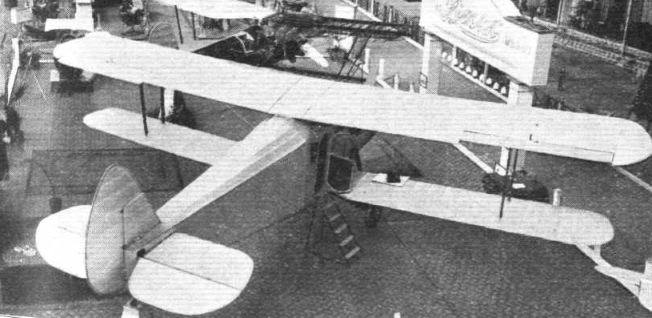
- At the Olympia show of July 1929 with mockup Neptune engine

General information
- Type: Civil transport
- National origin: United Kingdom
- Manufacturer: Bristol Aeroplane Company
- Designer: Frank Barnwell
- Number built: 1

History
- First flight: 25 October 1929
- Retired: February 1930

The Bristol Type 110A was a single-engine biplane for charter work, accommodating four passengers in comfort. Designed by Frank Barnwell and built at Filton Aerodrome by the Bristol Aeroplane Company. No orders were obtained and only one aircraft was built.

== Development ==
The Bristol 110A was a four-passenger biplane aimed at the charter market, a slightly enlarged version of a projected Type 110 three-passenger aeroplane. It was a single-engine, single-bay biplane that could be powered by one of two smaller relatives of the nine-cylinder Bristol Jupiter radial engine: the five-cylinder, 220 hp (164 kW) Titan or the seven-cylinder 315 hp (235 kW) Neptune. The wings were unswept, unstaggered, and of almost equal span, but the lower plane has a much narrower chord than the upper. Frise-type ailerons were fitted only on the upper wing. The Type 110A was an all-metal, fabric-covered aircraft with a flat-sided fuselage, a horn-balanced rudder and an unbraced horizontal tail carrying unbalanced elevators. The passenger cabin, located between the wings, had three windows on each side, one of which was on the starboard side door. The pilot sat high ahead of the leading edge of the upper wing in a glazed cockpit behind the completely cowled engine. The undercarriage was of the divided type, with wide track main wheels and a tailskid.

The Type 110A, registered G-AAFG, first flew with the Titan engine, piloted by Cyril Uwins, on 25 October 1929, after its appearance with a mockup Neptune engine at the Olympia Aero Show in July that year, where its well-appointed cabin impressed visitors but gained no orders. The Neptune was installed in January 1930 and testing proceeded satisfactorily until the aircraft was damaged in a landing accident in early February; as there were no orders in sight, it was decided to abandon the project and the aircraft was scrapped.

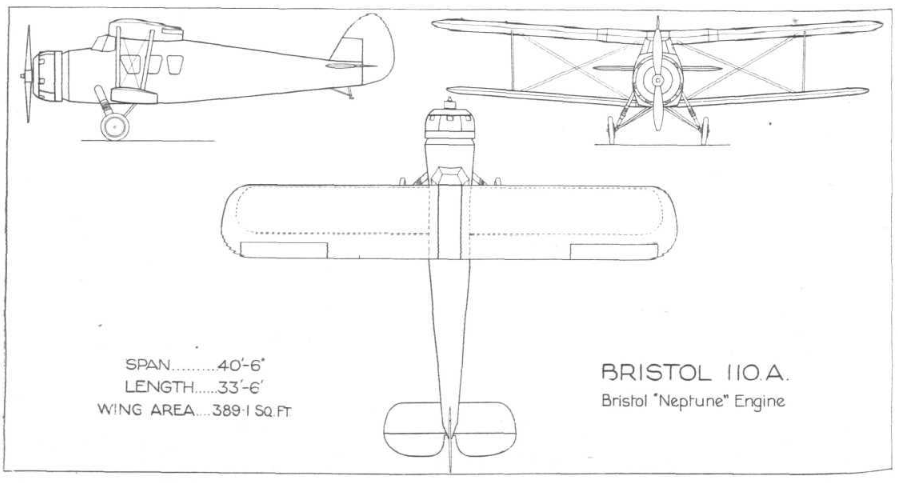

== Specifications ==
Data from Barnes 1970, p. 238 Barnes does not say whether these specifications apply to the Titan or Neptune variant. Dimensions will not be much affected, weights and performance more so, They are more likely to refer to the Titan-powered 110A as this was tested longer.

General characteristics

- Crew: one
- Capacity: four
- Length: 33 ft 6 in (10.21 m)
- Wingspan: 40 ft 6 in (12.34 m)
- Height: 10 ft 2 in (3.10 m)
- Wing area: 389 sq ft (36.14 m^{2})
- Empty weight: 2,330 lb (1,057 kg)
- Gross weight: 4,360 lb (1,978 kg)
- Powerplant: 1 × Bristol Titan five-cylinder air-cooled radial , 220 hp (164 kW)

Performance

- Maximum speed: 125 mph (201 km/h, 109 kn)
