= Albatros L 69 =

L 69
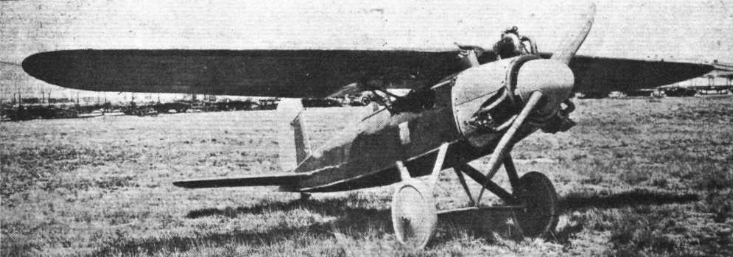
- Albatros L.69 at the 1925 Round Germany Contest

General information
- Type: Racer
- Manufacturer: Albatros Flugzeugwerke
- Designer: R. Schubert
- Number built: 4

History
- First flight: 1925

The Albatros L 69 was a two-seat German parasol monoplane racing and training aircraft of 1925. It was a single-engine parasol-wing monoplane of conventional configuration that seated the pilot and passenger in tandem, open cockpits. It was advertised as a trainer, however contemporary reports dismissed this due to the difficulty in accessing the front cockpit, and the designers' focus on performance.

== Operational history ==
In 1925, the Albatros test pilot Kurt Ungewitter won Class D in the Deutsche Rundflug ("Round Germany") in an L 69a, but was killed in one in a crash two years later. The "Round-Saxony" flight Class D was won by a Bristol Lucifer-engined Albatros L.69, piloted by a student at an average speed of 165 km/h.

== Variants ==
- L 69 – two examples with Bristol Lucifer engine
- L 69a – two examples with Siemens-Halske Sh 12 engine

== Specifications (L 69a) ==
General characteristics

- Crew: two, pilot and instructor
- Length: 6.10 m (20 ft 0 in)
- Wingspan: 8.06 m (26 ft 5 in)
- Height: 2.57 m (8 ft 5 in)
- Wing area: 14.0 m^{2} (151 sq ft)
- Empty weight: 480 kg (1,058 lb)
- Gross weight: 685 kg (1,510 lb)
- Powerplant: 1 × Siemens-Halske Sh 12 , 80 kW (110 hp)

Performance

- Maximum speed: 170 km/h (110 mph, 96 kn)
- Endurance: 2 hours
- Service ceiling: 4,000 m (13,100 ft)
- Rate of climb: 4.2 m/s (820 ft/min)

== Bibliography ==
- Taylor, Michael J. H. (1989). Jane's Encyclopedia of Aviation. London: Studio Editions. p. 55.
- German Aircraft between 1919–1945
- bungartz.nl
- Flight magazine 29 October 1925 on Albatros L.69 12
