= Jacobs R-915 =

Radial aircraft engine manufactured in the United States

R-915
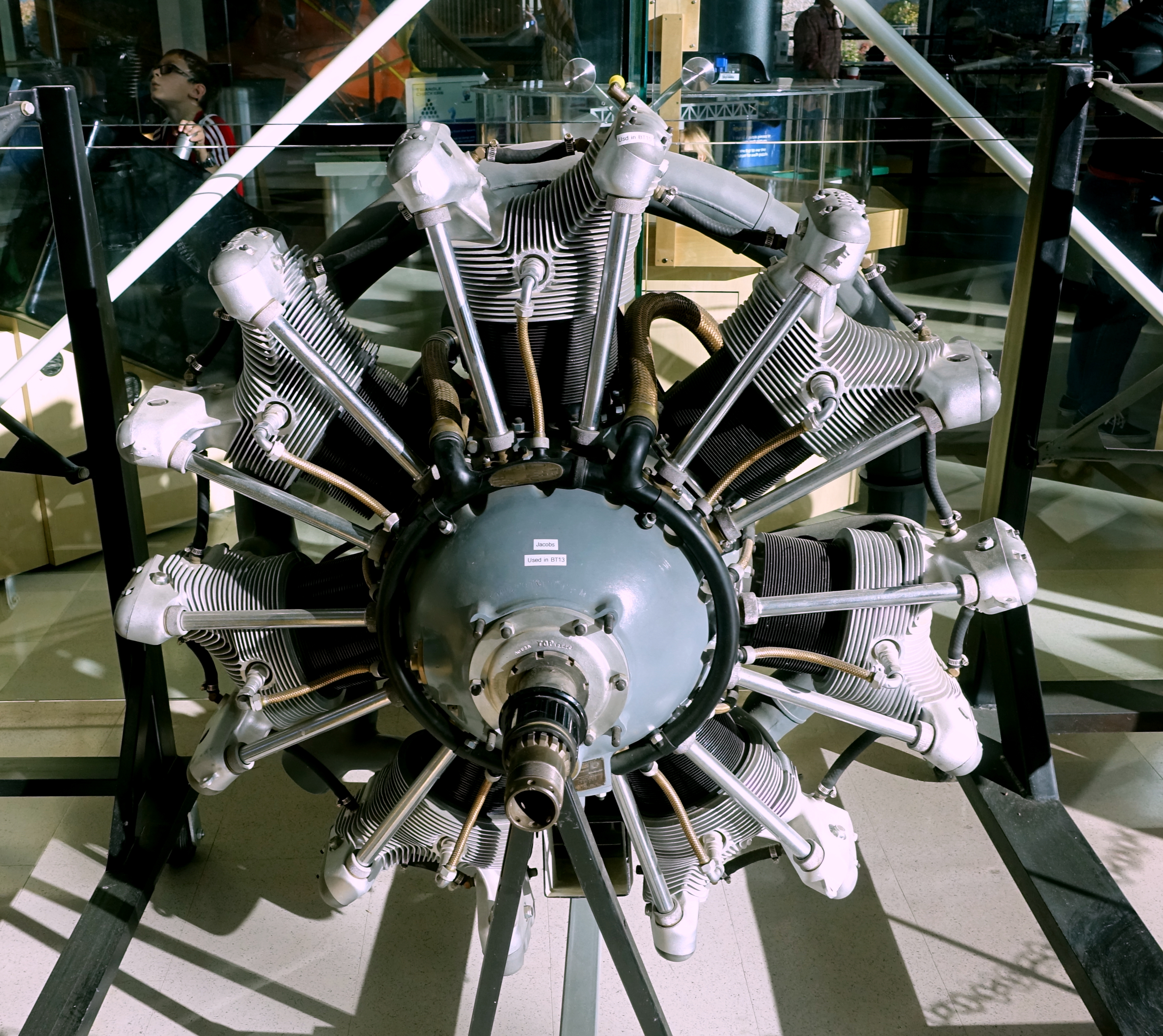
- Type: Radial engine
- Manufacturer: Jacobs Aircraft Engine Company
- Developed from: Jacobs R-755

The Jacobs R-915 or Jacobs L-6 is a seven-cylinder, air-cooled, radial engine for aircraft manufactured in the United States, production started in 1936.

== Design and development ==
The R-915 was effectively an enlargement of the R-755 with strengthened stressed parts. With a bore and stroke of 5.5 in × 5.5 in (140 mm × 140 mm), for a displacement of 915 cu in (15 L). Take-off power was around 330 hp (250 kW). The engine features steel cylinders with aluminum-alloy cylinder heads.

== Variants ==
L-6MB
Rated at 300 hp (220 kW) at 2,100 rpm.

R-915-7
Military version of the L-6MB.

R-915A1
Baseline variant; an enlarged R-755. Equivalent to the L-6MB.
R-915A3
Similar to the A1 but with Scintilla magnetos. Equivalent to the L-6M.
R-915A4
With a power take-off for autogyros. Equivalent to the L-6MBA.

== Applications ==
- Avro Anson Mk II and Mk III
- Beechcraft Model 18D
- Beechcraft F-17D Staggerwing
- Fleet 50
- Howard DGA-15J
- Kellett KD-1
- Waco AQC, AGC, ARE, AVN

== Engines on display ==
- A preserved Jacobs R-915 is on display at the Nanton Lancaster Society.
- A Jacobs L-6 is on display at the Canadian Museum of Flight

== Specifications (R-915A1) ==
Data from Jane's

=== General characteristics ===
- Type: 7-cylinder air-cooled radial piston engine
- Bore: 5.5 in (140 mm)
- Stroke: 5.5 in (140 mm)
- Displacement: 915 cu in (15 L)
- Length: 40 in (1,030 mm)
- Diameter: 45.5 in (1,160 mm)
- Dry weight: 555 lb (252 kg)

=== Components ===
- Valvetrain: 2 valves per cylinder (pushrod-actuated); sodium cooled exhaust valves
- Fuel system: Single Stromberg NA-R7A carburetor
- Fuel type: 80 octane
- Oil system: One pressure pump, two scavenge pumps
- Cooling system: Air-cooled
- Reduction gear: Direct drive, right hand tractor

=== Performance ===
- Power output: 330 hp (246 kW) at 2,200 RPM at sea level
- Specific power: 0.36 hp/cu-in (16.4 kW/L)
- Compression ratio: 6:1
- Power-to-weight ratio: 0.6 hp/lb (1 kW/kg)

== See also ==
Related development

- Jacobs R-755

Comparable engines

- Armstrong Siddeley Cheetah
- Avia Rk.17
- Bristol Neptune
- Piaggio Stella P.VII
- Wright R-760

Related lists

- List of aircraft engines
