= Spar (aeronautics) =

Main structural member of the wing of an aircraft

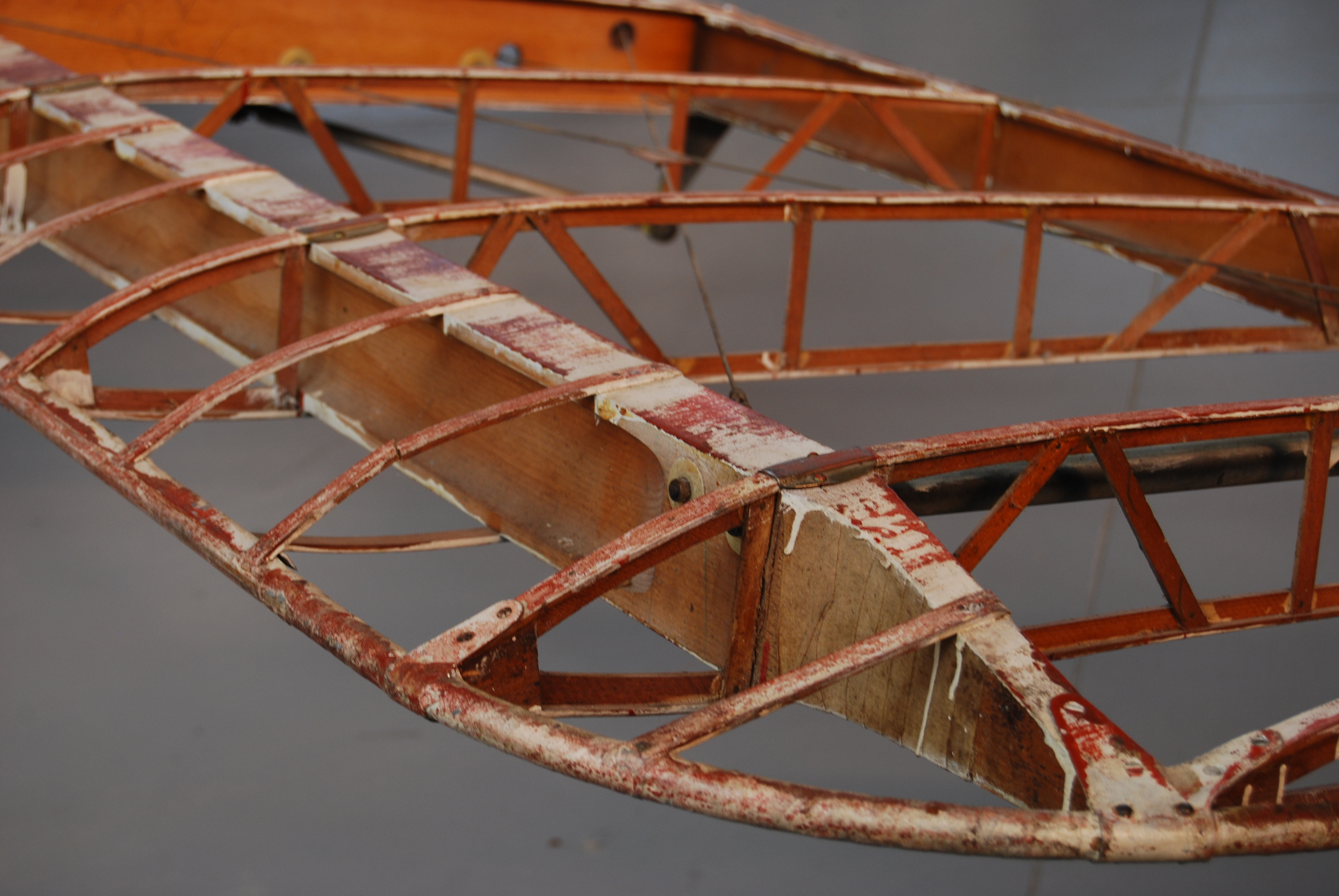
Main spar of a de Havilland DH.60 Moth

In a fixed-wing aircraft, the spar is often the main structural member of the wing, running spanwise at right angles (or thereabouts depending on wing sweep) to the fuselage. The spar carries flight loads and the weight of the wings while on the ground. Other structural and forming members such as ribs may be attached to the spar or spars, with stressed skin construction also sharing the loads where it is used. There may be more than one spar in a wing or none at all. Where a single spar carries most of the force, it is known as the main spar.

Spars are also used in other aircraft aerofoil surfaces such as the tailplane and fin and serve a similar function, although the loads transmitted may be different from those of a wing spar.

== Spar loads ==
The wing spar provides the majority of the weight support and dynamic load integrity of cantilever monoplanes, often coupled with the strength of the wing 'D' box itself. Together, these two structural components collectively provide the wing rigidity needed to enable the aircraft to fly safely. Biplanes employing flying wires have much of the flight loads transmitted through the wires and interplane struts enabling smaller section and thus lighter spars to be used at the cost of increasing drag.

=== Forces ===
Some of the forces acting on a wing spar are:

- Upward bending loads resulting from the wing lift force that supports the fuselage in flight. These forces are often offset by carrying fuel in the wings or employing wing-tip-mounted fuel tanks; the Cessna 310 is an example of this design feature.
- Downward bending loads while stationary on the ground due to the weight of the structure, fuel carried in the wings, and wing-mounted engines if used.
- Drag loads dependent on airspeed and inertia.
- Rolling inertia loads.
- Chordwise twisting loads due to aerodynamic effects at high airspeeds often associated with washout, and the use of ailerons resulting in control reversal. Further twisting loads are induced by changes of thrust settings to underwing-mounted engines. The "D" box construction is beneficial to reduce wing twisting.

Many of these loads are reversed abruptly in flight with an aircraft such as the Extra 300 when performing extreme aerobatic manoeuvers; the spars of these aircraft are designed to safely withstand great load factors.

== Materials and construction ==
=== Wooden construction ===
Early aircraft used spars often carved from solid spruce or ash. Several different wooden spar types have been used and experimented with such as spars that are box-section in form; and laminated spars laid up in a jig, and compression glued to retain the wing dihedral. Wooden spars are still being used in light aircraft such as the Robin DR400 and its relatives. A disadvantage of the wooden spar is the deteriorating effect that atmospheric conditions, both dry and wet, and biological threats such as wood-boring insect infestation and fungal attack can have on the component; consequently regular inspections are often mandated to maintain airworthiness.

Wood wing spars of multipiece construction usually consist of upper and lower members, called spar caps, and vertical sheet wood members, known as shear webs or more simply webs, that span the distance between the spar caps.

Even in modern times, "homebuilt replica aircraft" such as the replica Spitfires use laminated wooden spars. These spars are laminated usually from spruce or douglas fir (by clamping and glueing). A number of enthusiasts build "replica" Spitfires that will actually fly using a variety of engines relative to the size of the aircraft.

=== Metal spars ===
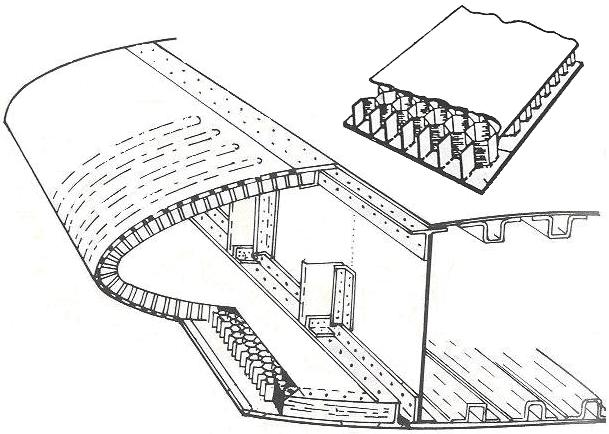
Basic metal-sparred wing using a honeycomb 'D' box leading edge

A typical metal spar in a general aviation aircraft usually consists of a sheet aluminium spar web, with L- or T-shaped spar caps being welded or riveted to the top and bottom of the sheet to prevent buckling under applied loads. Larger aircraft using this method of spar construction may have the spar caps sealed to provide integral fuel tanks. Fatigue of metal wing spars has been an identified causal factor in aviation accidents, especially in older aircraft as was the case with Chalk's Ocean Airways Flight 101.

=== Tubular metal spars ===
The German Junkers J.I armoured fuselage ground-attack sesquiplane of 1917 used a Hugo Junkers-designed multi-tube network of several tubular wing spars, placed just under the corrugated duralumin wing covering and with each tubular spar connected to the adjacent one with a space frame of triangulated duralumin strips — usually in the manner of a Warren truss layout — riveted onto the spars, resulting in a substantial increase in structural strength at a time when most other aircraft designs were built almost completely with wood-structure wings. The Junkers all-metal corrugated-covered wing / multiple tubular wing spar design format was emulated after World War I by American aviation designer William Stout for his 1920s-era Ford Trimotor airliner series, and by Russian aerospace designer Andrei Tupolev for such aircraft as his Tupolev ANT-2 of 1922, upwards in size to the then-gigantic Maksim Gorki of 1934.

A design aspect of the Supermarine Spitfire wing that contributed greatly to its success was an innovative spar boom design, made up of five square concentric tubes that fitted into each other. Two of these booms were linked together by an alloy web, creating a lightweight and very strong main spar.

A version of this spar construction method is also used in the BD-5, which was designed and constructed by Jim Bede in the early 1970s. The spar used in the BD-5 and subsequent BD projects was primarily aluminium tube of approximately 2 inches (5.1 cm) in diameter, and joined at the wing root with a much larger internal diameter aluminium tube to provide the wing structural integrity.

=== Geodesic construction ===
In aircraft such as the Vickers Wellington, a geodesic wing spar structure was employed, which had the advantages of being lightweight and able to withstand heavy battle damage with only partial loss of strength.

=== Composite construction ===
Many modern aircraft use carbon fibre and Kevlar in their construction, ranging in size from large airliners to small homebuilt aircraft. Of note are the developments made by Scaled Composites and the German glider manufacturers Schempp-Hirth and Schleicher. These companies initially employed solid fibreglass spars in their designs but now often use carbon fibre in their high performance gliders such as the ASG 29. The increase in strength and reduction in weight compared to the earlier fibreglass-sparred aircraft allows a greater quantity of water ballast to be carried.

=== Multi-spar construction ===
Aircraft utilizing three or more spars are considered multi-spar aircraft. Using multiple spars allows for an equivalent overall strength of wing, but with multiple, smaller, spars, which in turn allow for a thinner wing or tail structure (at a cost of increased complexity and difficulty of packaging additional equipment such as fuel tanks, guns, aileron jacks, etc.). Although multi-spar wings have been used since at least the 1930s (for example, the World War 2-era Curtiss P-40 had 3 spars per wing), they gained greater popularity when the increasing speed of jet fighters demanded thinner wings to reduce drag at high speeds. The Mach 2 F-104 Starfighter used numerous slender spars to allow for a wing of unusually thin section; the F-16 Fighting Falcon uses a similar construction. Other aircraft like the F-4 Phantom, F-15 Eagle and others use 3 or more spars to give sufficient strength in a relatively thin wing, and thus qualify as multi-spar aircraft.

== False spars ==
False spars, like main spars, are load bearing structural members running spanwise but are not joined to the fuselage. Their most common purpose is to carry moving surfaces, principally ailerons.
