= Tupolev ANT-2 =

ANT-2
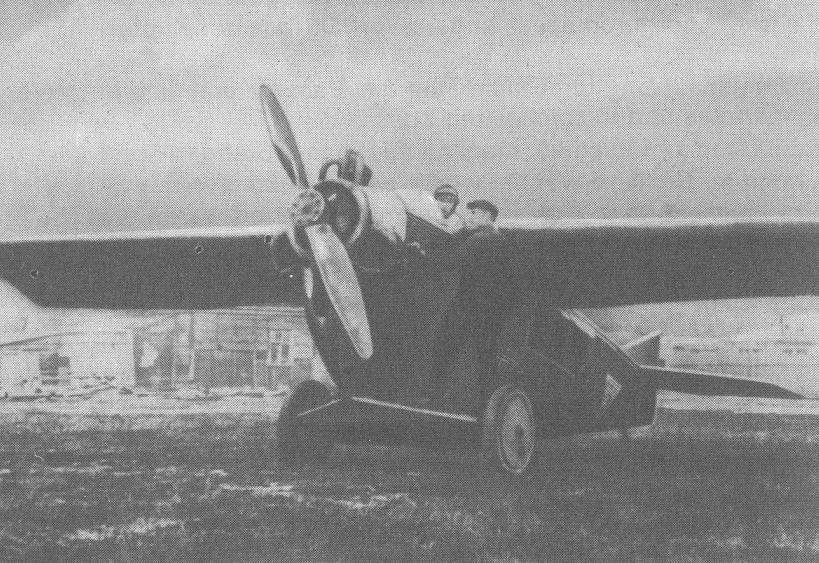

General information
- Type: Experimental aircraft
- Manufacturer: Tupolev
- Number built: 5

History
- First flight: 26 May 1924

The ANT-2 was the first all-metal aircraft designed by the Tupolev design bureau. A small passenger plane, it could carry two passengers in a cabin behind the pilot.

== Background ==
Andrei Tupolev saw the practicality of metal used in aircraft construction. Light metal alloys were more durable than wood and held up better in the severe Russian winters. In September 1922, a factory at Kolchuginsk, in the Vladimir region, approximately 121 km (75 mi) from Moscow, had fabricated a high-grade alloy, named Kolchugaluminum. A special commission was established on 21 October 1922, within Tsentralniy Aerogidrodinamicheskiy Institut (TsAGI) to be headed by Tupolev, charged with developing tests of the metal's strength and establishing all-metal aircraft production. The design bureau had fifteen engineers, technicians, and draftsmen. The first components made at the bureau were used to train craftsmen in aircraft fabrication using the new materials.

The creation of duraluminum was regarded by Tupolev as the Soviet Union's aviation industry's birth. Building the required alloy-working skills was a challenge to Tupolev, TsAGI, and the factory in Kolchuginsk. Trialling the new materials on aerosleighs, boats, and gliders, they developed techniques not used at the time by the leader in the industry, Junkers, but which proved to be at least as effective.

== Design and development ==
The ANT-2's construction was done by TsAGI's AGOS division on floors one and three on 16 Radio Street in Moscow. The design was a cantilever high-wing monoplane with a triangular cross-section, which proved useful because of the increased strength and rigidity, which reduced the need for fuselage struts to keep the same shape, and added the aerodynamic benefit of avoiding vortex drag under the aft fuselage. The fuselage was divided into three sections: the first gave easy access to the engine for inspection, the second was an enclosed area for the two passengers, who faced each other- with an entrance through a door on the side of the fuselage, and the third, left vacant, was the tail elements. The passenger area was behind and below the cockpit, where the pilot was in an open canopy. Similar to contemporary Junkers designs, the aircraft skin was made of corrugated iron sheeting. The engine was a British Bristol Lucifer piston engine which could produce 100 HP.

Completion of the first aircraft was in May 1924, with two sacks filled with sand to represent the passengers' weight. The first flight was on 26 May, conducted by Nikolai Petrov. The ANT-2 proved difficult to manage and unstable in flight, but its handling qualities were improved after enlargement of the tail. However, due to material shortages in the USSR, and difficulty in obtaining engines, the project never reached the stage of mass production.

== Surviving aircraft ==
A surviving example of the ANT-2 is preserved at the Central Air Force Museum at Monino, outside Moscow, Russia.

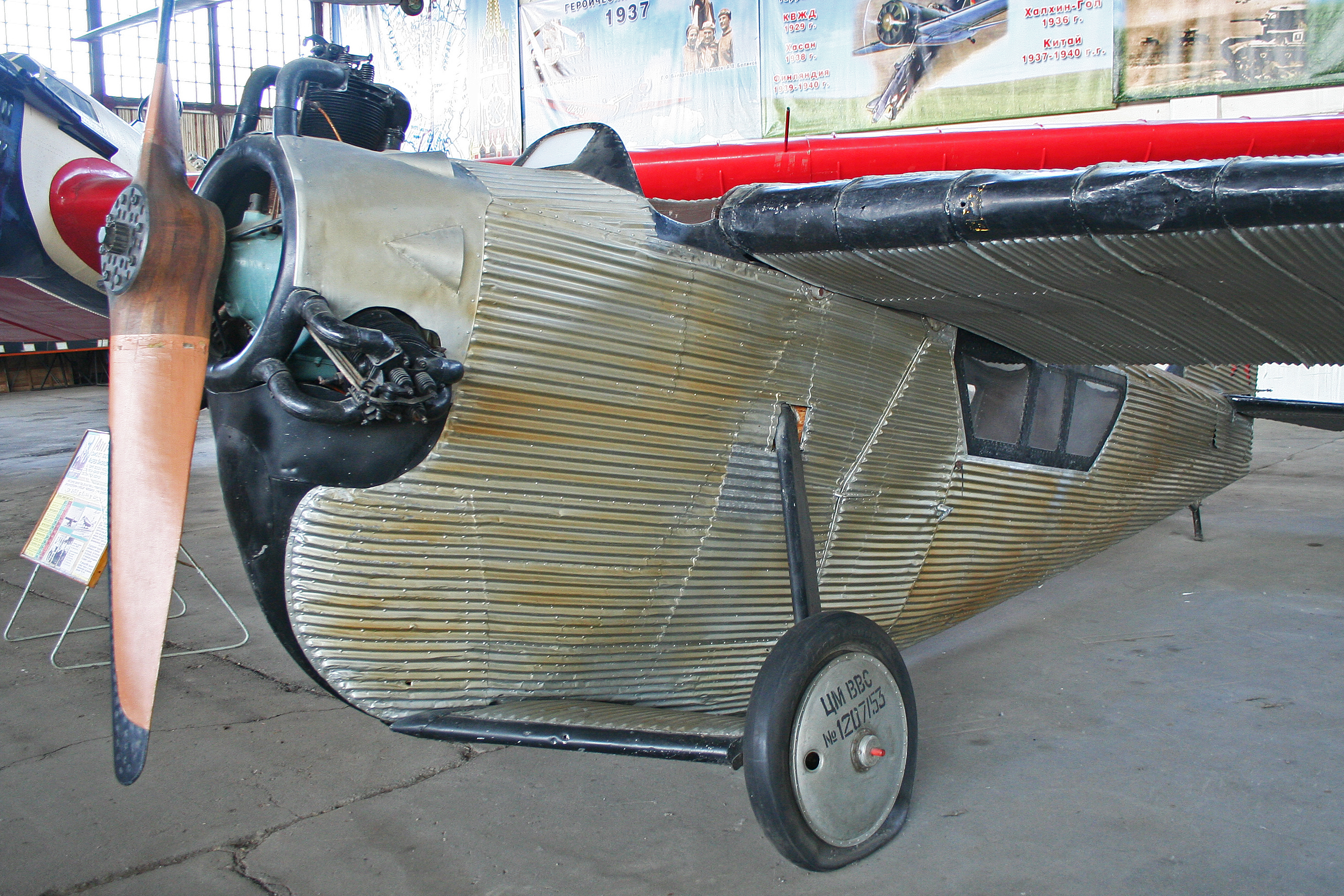
Monino ANT-2

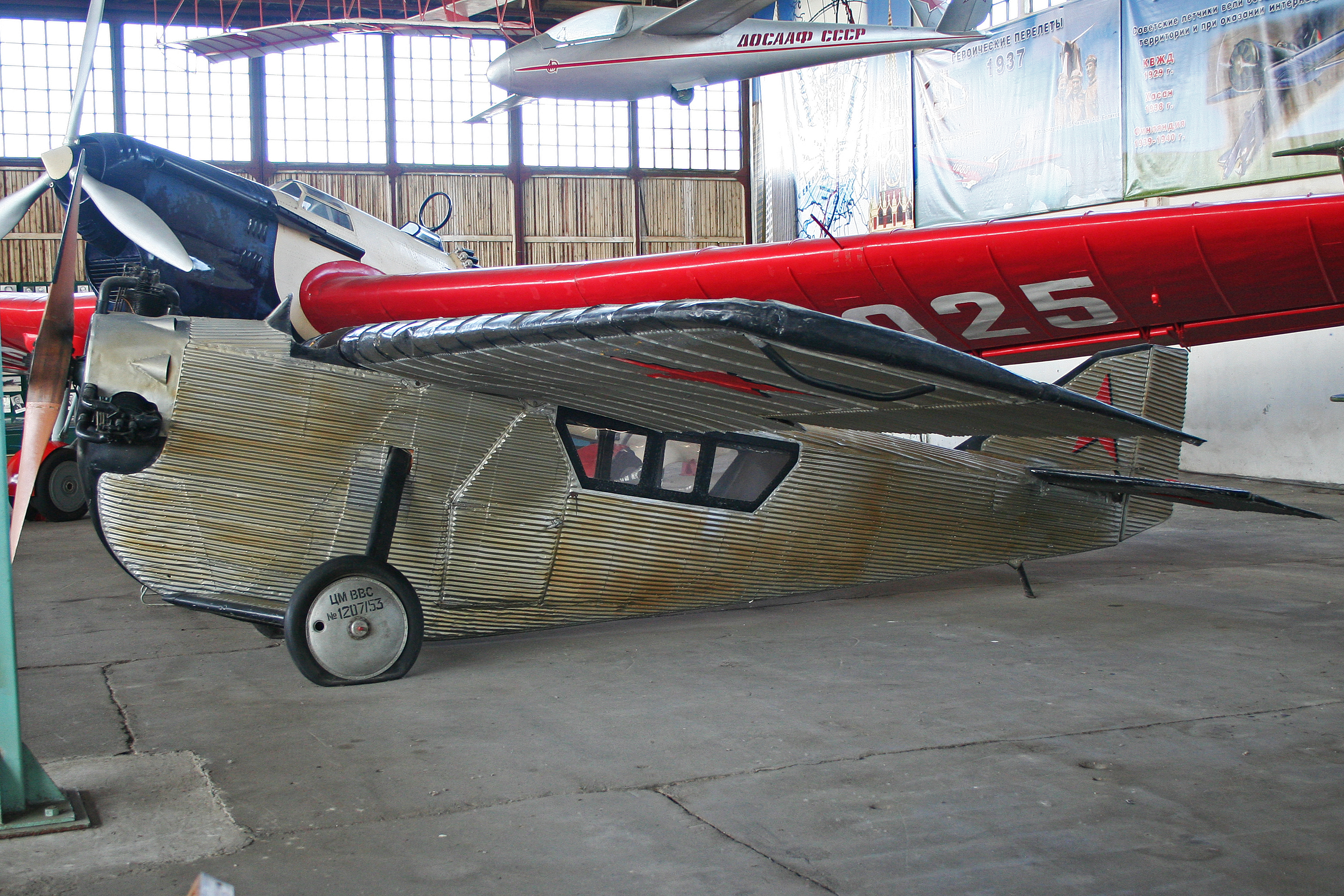

== Specifications ==
General characteristics

- Crew: one pilot
- Capacity: two passengers
- Length: 7.50 m (24 ft 7 in)
- Wingspan: 10.00 m (32 ft 10 in)
- Wing area: 17.5 m^{2} (188 sq ft)
- Empty weight: 523 kg (1,153 lb)
- Gross weight: 836 kg (1,848 lb)
- Powerplant: 1 × Bristol Lucifer , 75 kW (100 hp)

Performance

- Maximum speed: 170 km/h (106 mph, 92 kn)
- Range: 425 km (265 mi, 230 nmi)
- Service ceiling: 3,300 m (10,800 ft)
