= Bristol Titan =

British five-cylinder radial engine

Titan
- The Bristol Titan
- Type: Piston aero engine
- Manufacturer: Bristol Aeroplane Company
- Designer: Roy Fedden
- First run: c.1928
- Major applications: Avro 504N; Bristol Primary Trainer
- Developed into: Bristol Neptune

The Bristol Titan was a British five-cylinder air-cooled radial engine, designed and built by the Bristol Aeroplane Company in the late 1920s. It had the same size cylinders as the earlier Bristol Mercury engine of 5.75 in × 6.5 in (146 mm × 165 mm) (displacing 844 cu in (13.83 L)) and produced between 200–240 hp (150–180 kW). Later versions of the Bristol Titan also used a Farman-style reduction gear produced by Gnome-Rhône.

== Design and development ==
The engine was designed as a five-cylinder radial, to use as many parts of the Bristol Jupiter as possible. Cylinders, pistons, articulated connecting rods, crankshaft and other minor parts were interchangeable with the Jupiter.

The major significance of the Titan was that it was licensed to Gnome-Rhône and became the pattern for the Gnome-Rhône 5B and 5K. In 1927, Gnome-Rhône was looking for ways out of its licence agreement with Bristol for the Jupiter engine of 1920 and began to produce the Gnome-Rhône 5B and 5K without royalties.

Gnome-Rhône was not satisfied with producing Bristol designs under licence, and started a major design effort based around the mechanics of the Titan engine. The results were introduced in 1927 as the K-series, spanning the 260 hp (190 kW) Gnome-Rhône 5K Titan, the seven-cylinder 370 hp (280 kW) Gnome-Rhône 7K Titan Major, and the nine-cylinder 550 hp (410 kW) Gnome-Rhône 9K Mistral. As a result, Gnome-Rhône ended royalty payments to Bristol, and the Gnome-Rhône 5K were built in much greater numbers than the original Bristol Titan. By 1930 they had delivered 6,000 Jupiters, Mistrals and Titans, making them the largest engine company in France.

== Variants ==
Titan I
(1928) - 205 hp (153 kW)
Titan IIF
Modified valve gear.
Titan II (Special)
Titan IV
(1928) - 205 hp (153 kW), 0.5:1 reduction gear from Bristol Jupiter.
Gnome et Rhône 5B
Gnome et Rhône 5Ba
Gnome et Rhône 5Bc
Gnome et Rhône 5K Titan
Licence-built Titan II, 230 hp (170 kW)
Gnome et Rhône 7K Titan Major

Enlarged seven-cylinder Titan with many detail improvements, produced by Gnome-Rhône without licence.

== Applications ==
- Avro 504N
- Bristol Primary Trainer
- Bristol Type 110A

== Specifications (Titan I) ==
Data from Lumsden.

=== General characteristics ===
- Type: five-cylinder air-cooled radial engine.
- Bore: 5.75 in (146 mm)
- Stroke: 6.5 in (165 mm)
- Displacement: 844 in^{3} (13.8 L)
- Diameter: 48.4 in (1,229 mm)
- Dry weight: 500 lb (227 kg)

=== Components ===
- Valvetrain: Overhead valve, 4 valves per cylinder
- Cooling system: Air-cooled
- Reduction gear: None, direct drive, left hand tractor

=== Performance ===
- Power output: 210 hp (157 kW) at 1,800 rpm
- Specific power: 0.25 hp/in^{3} (11.4 kW/L)
- Compression ratio: 5:1
- Power-to-weight ratio: 0.42 hp/lb (0.7 kW/kg)

== See also ==
Related development

- Bristol Mercury
- Bristol Neptune

Comparable engines

- Armstrong Siddeley Mongoose

Related lists

- List of aircraft engines
