= 1920s in air cargo =

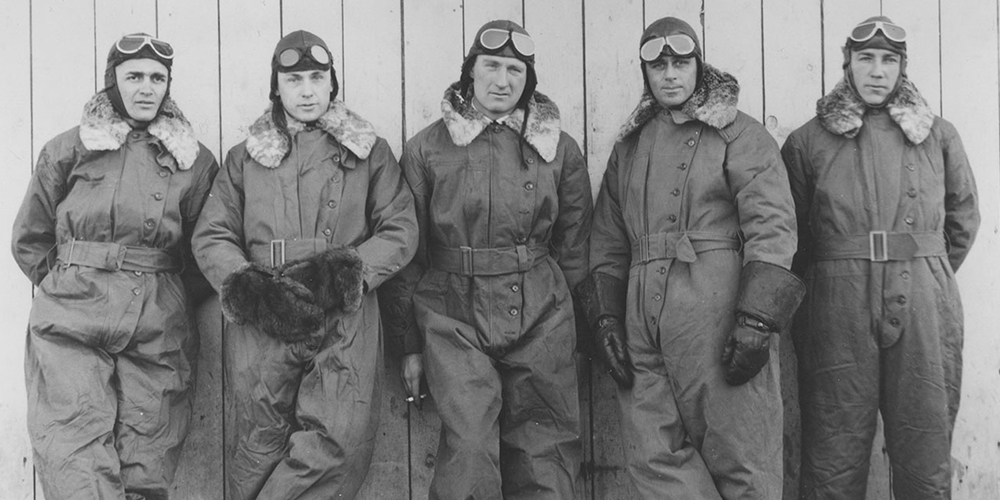
Early U.S. government Airmail pilots

This is a list of air cargo, airmail and airlift related events as well as a summary for the decade 1920–1929.

== Overview ==
=== Civil developments ===
Early airlines appeared worldwide, often with airmail as a main driver for the business and routes. Many new routes were tried and scheduled. Landmark long-distance and overseas flights were performed, demonstrating the potential of air travel, airmail and air cargo, while also raising public awareness of aviation's possibilities.

In Europe, the foundations of modern air cargo and airmail were established, driven by surplus aircraft and personnel from World War I. Former military bombers such as the Farman F.60 Goliath were converted for civilian use, carrying both passengers and freight.

In the United States, airmail as well as commercial air freight services expanded over the continent. The Kelly Act (1925) triggered a spate of airline foundations and reorganizations in the U.S. because private companies could now bid for airmail routes. Commercial air cargo volumes in the United States saw explosive, near-exponential growth in the late 1920s.

Aircraft reliability improved in the 1920s, enabling longer scheduled services and even overwater flights, but capacity for cargo remained limited. The focus was largely on light, high-value items such as letters, newspapers, diplomatic documents, medical supplies, and luxury goods. Cargo handling was rudimentary: there were no standard containers or mechanised loading systems, and many airports were simple ex-military airfields. The introduction of visual airway beacons and the start of the transition to radio-based navigation (low-frequency radio ranges, NDB/RDF developments) within the same decade, were developments that gave a crucial advance making night and all-weather airmail / air cargo operations more reliable.

By the end of the 1920s, although air transport was still far from replacing rail or sea freight, it had proven itself as a rapid conduit for crucial goods. The decade laid critical groundwork: operational models combining cargo and passenger services, nascent air-freight networks, and more mature aircraft technology. These developments set the stage for the expansion of international air cargo in the decades that followed.

=== Military developments ===
Military air transport roles continued to shape early civil routes, often to colonial destinations: military squadrons and aircraft (e.g., RAF aircraft and later larger types such as the Vickers Vernon) were used for early airmail routes (for example Cairo–Baghdad service), and some military-style aircraft were repurposed for civilian mail/cargo duties.

Beginning with Italy in 1927, several countries experimented with using parachutes to drop armed soldiers behind enemy lines, a first step towards later military airborne/airlift operational capabilities.

== Events ==
=== 1920 ===
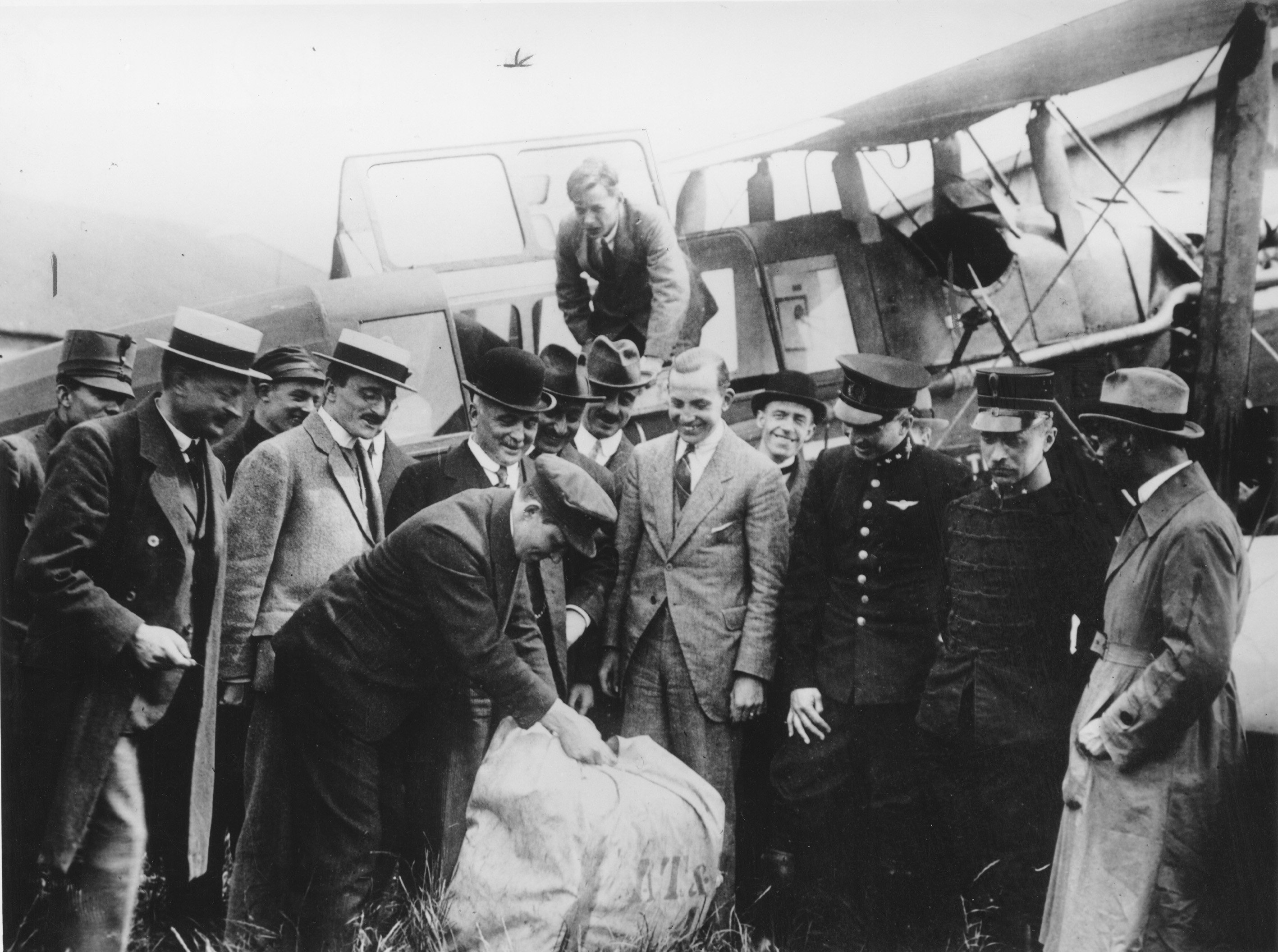
The first airmail arrives at Amsterdam Schiphol Airport via KLM in a rented De Havilland DH-16 from London

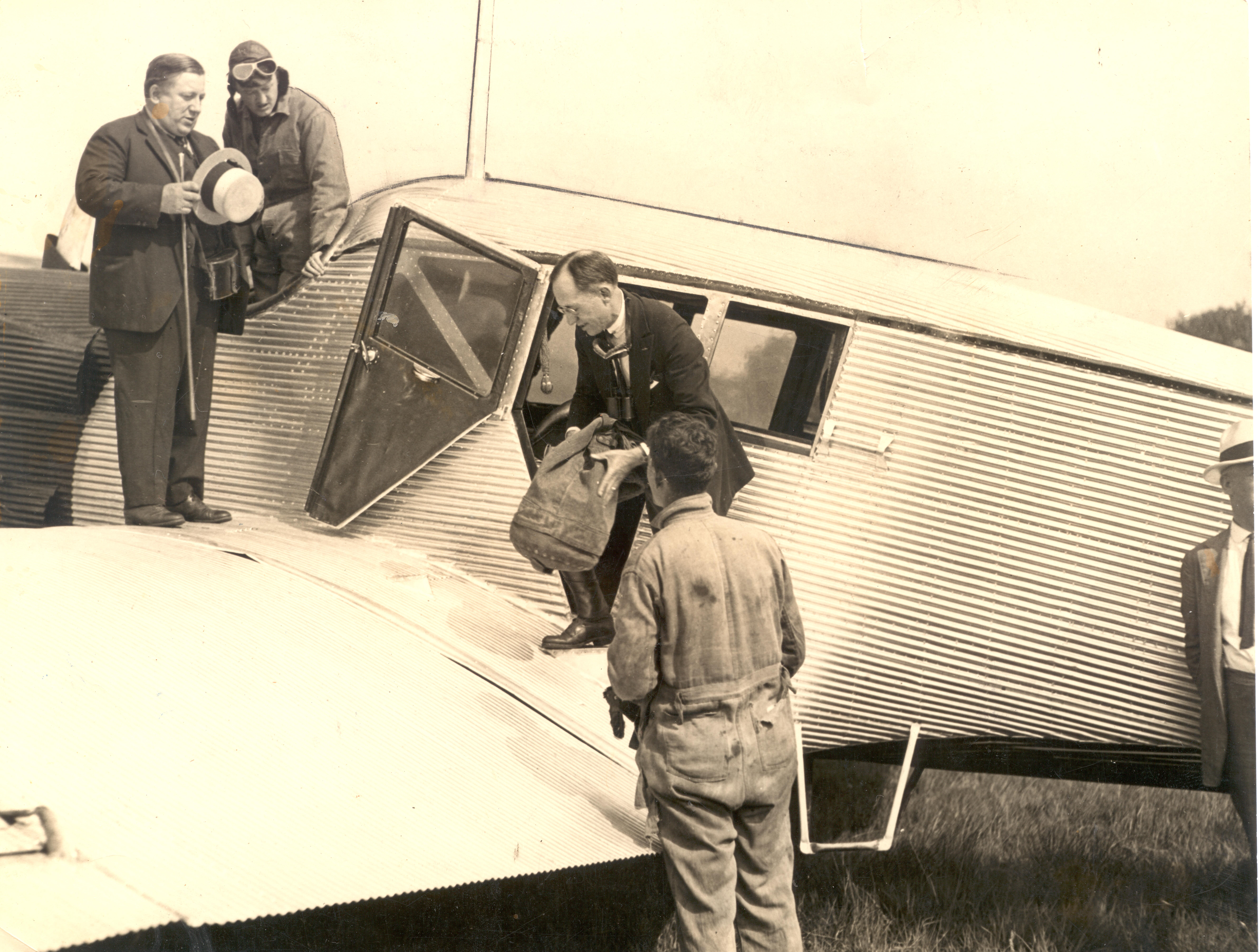
Photograph of airmail loaded for U.S. pathfinding transcontinental flight

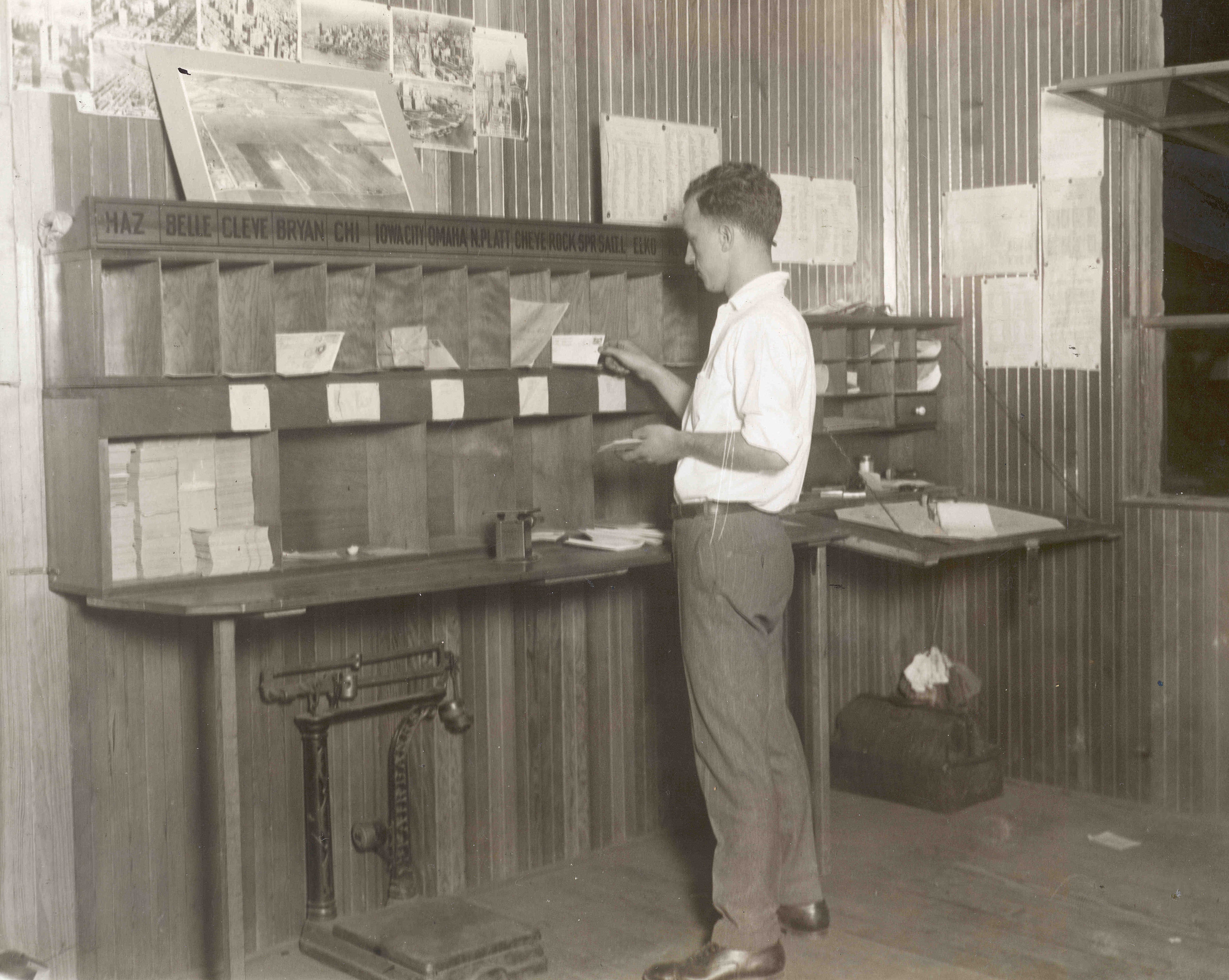
Sorting airmail in U.S.

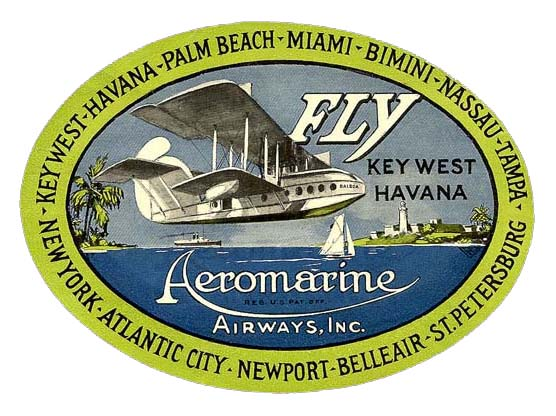
Aeromarine baggage label

- Undated – (Cuba) First airmail flight in Cuba by Cuban aviator Jaime González.
- Undated – (United Kingdom – France) Instone Air Line transports newspapers to the French Riviera during the railway strike of 1920.
- May 17 – (England – Netherlands) First airmail from England to the Netherlands – the first KLM flight (carrying airmail) arrives at Amsterdam Schiphol Airport in the Netherlands from London, with a rented De Havilland DH-16. Jerry Shaw was the first pilot on this route. This route is still operational today.
- July 5 – (Netherlands – England) First airmail from the Netherlands to England by KLM pilot Hinchcliffe with the Airco DH.9 G-EAMX. KLM signed an agreement with the Dutch Royal Mail (signed on March 29, 1920) thus securing the transportation of airmail between the two cities.
- May – (United states) The United States Post Office's transcontinental airmail service (opened between New York and Chicago in September 1919) reached Omaha, Nebraska.
- September 8 – (United states) The United States Post Office's transcontinental airmail service final leg is added, across the Rocky Mountains from Omaha, Nebraska to Sacramento, California. Because flying at night is dangerous, the mail is carried along the route by train during the hours of darkness. The route significantly reduced coast-to-coast mail transit time compared to rail: A train alone needed 108 hours to cross the continental United States coast to coast, but this mix of air and rail decreased the time to 78 hours.
- October 15 – (United states) First U.S. contract international air mail route, from Seattle, Washington, to Victoria, British Columbia, Canada is awarded to Aviator Edward Hubbard. He will employ the Boeing B-1 flying boat on the route.
- November 1 – (United states) The United States Post Office awards a contract for international air mail to Aeromarine West Indies Airways.

=== 1921 ===
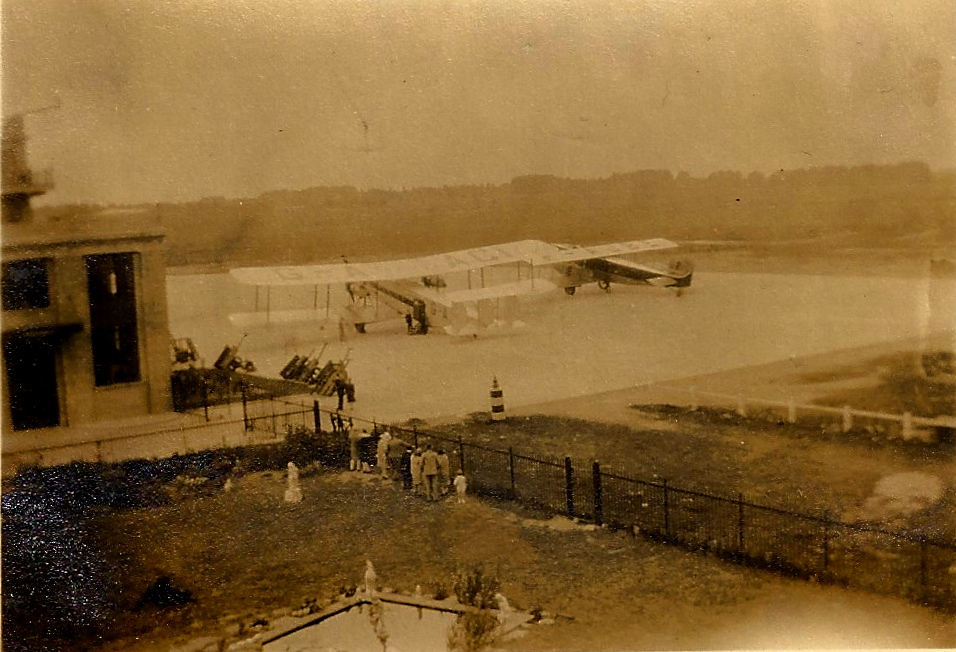
Croydon Airport, August 1929

Baghdad-Cairo Desert Route cachets

- Undated – (United Kingdom) The world's first cargo handling warehouse opens at Croydon airport in South London, facilitating the handling and storage of national and international goods transported by air via the airport.
- Undated – (United States) First U.S. airmail night flights. Concerned that the transcontinental U.S. Air Mail service established in September 1920 had turned out to be little faster – although much more expensive – than train-only service because the United States lacks a system of lighted navigation beacons, meaning that air mail pilots could not fly safely at night and trains had to carry air mail along the route during the hours of darkness, Assistant Postmaster General of the United States Otto Praeger stages four experimental day-and-night air mail flights as a publicity stunt before incoming President Warren G. Harding can take office on March 4 and appoint his successor. The flights consist of two eastbound and two westbound trips between New York City and San Francisco, California. The two westbound flights become stranded in Dubois, Pennsylvania, and Chicago, Illinois. The first eastbound flight ends in tragedy when the de Havilland DH-4B carrying the mail stalls and crashes after takeoff from Elko, Nevada. The only real success is by the second eastbound flight, whose pilot manages to fly at night from North Platte, Nebraska, to Chicago.
- Undated – (United Kingdom) The world's first airline to transport a racehorse is said to be Instone Air Line in this year. Instone is probably also the world's first airline to transport live animals because of another transport: a grouse from Scotland to London; undated but between 1919 and 1924).
- June 23 – (Egypt – Iraq) An air mail service between Cairo and Baghdad begins with an Airco DH.9 and Airco DH.10 Amiens aircraft of the Royal Air Force's No. 216 Squadron. Because more seats and cargo room were needed, the Vickers Vernon took over the service, due to its larger fuselage, which included an enclosed cabin for the comfort of up to six passengers and for protecting the mail.
- December 5 – (Australia) First regular scheduled (airmail + passengers) air service in Australia by Western Australian Airways (Norman Brearley). Western Australian Airways (established Dec 1921) won a subsidised airmail/passenger contract and inaugurated services that same month.

=== 1922 ===
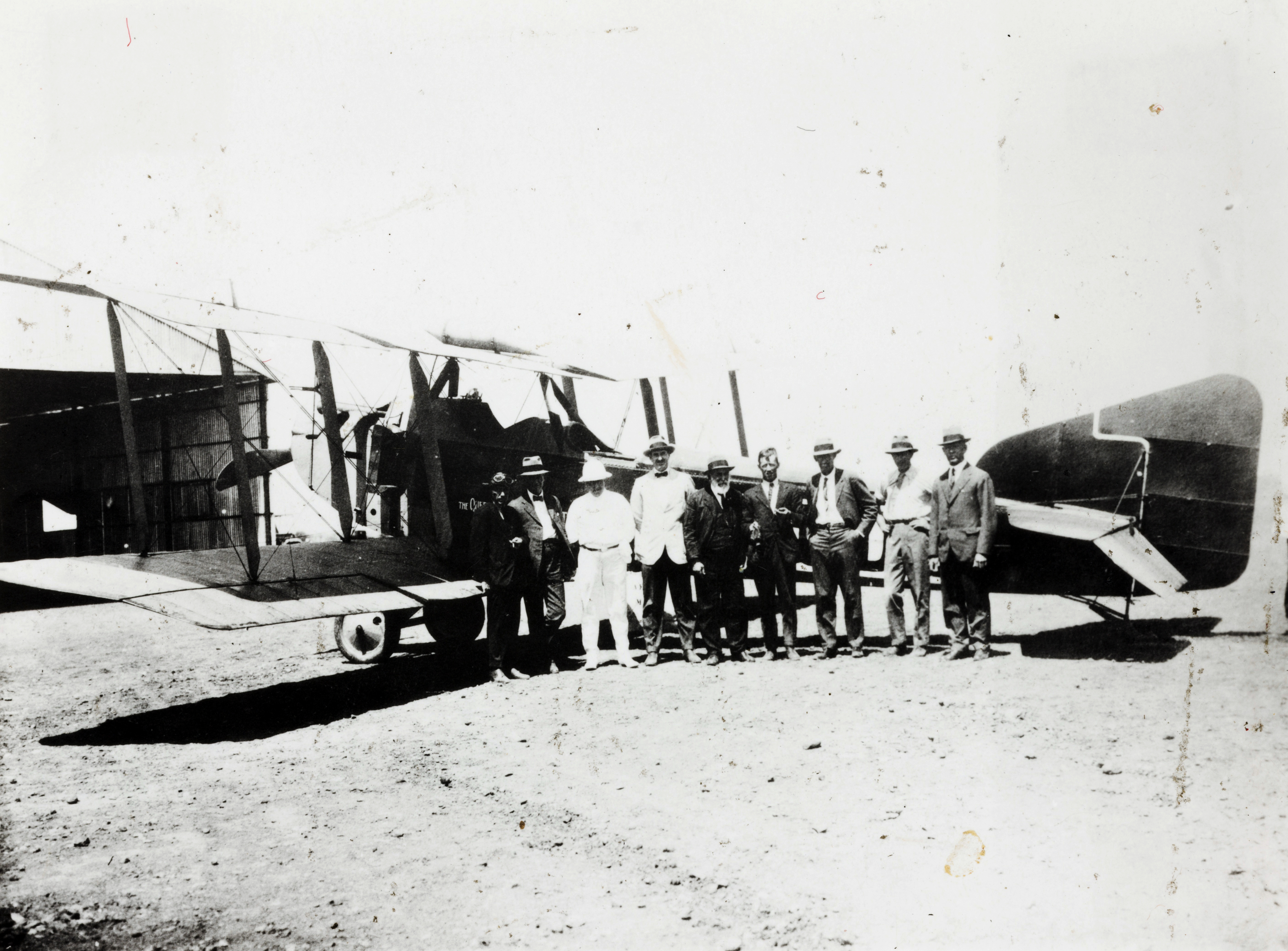
Airplane on the inaugural flight of the first Qantas service from Charleville to Cloncurry, Queensland, 1922

- November 2 – (Australia) Qantas started scheduled service between Charleville and Cloncurry after the first major air contract was landed in November 1922, its first regular airmail/passenger route.
- November 15 – (Japan) First scheduled passenger / cargo airline services in Japan, linking Sakai, Osaka, and Tokushima. It was the Sakai-Takamatsu route, established by Inoue Choichi's Japan Air Transport Research Institute. It operated three round-trip flights per week, handling both passengers and cargo, with a one-way fare of 40 yen.

=== 1923 ===
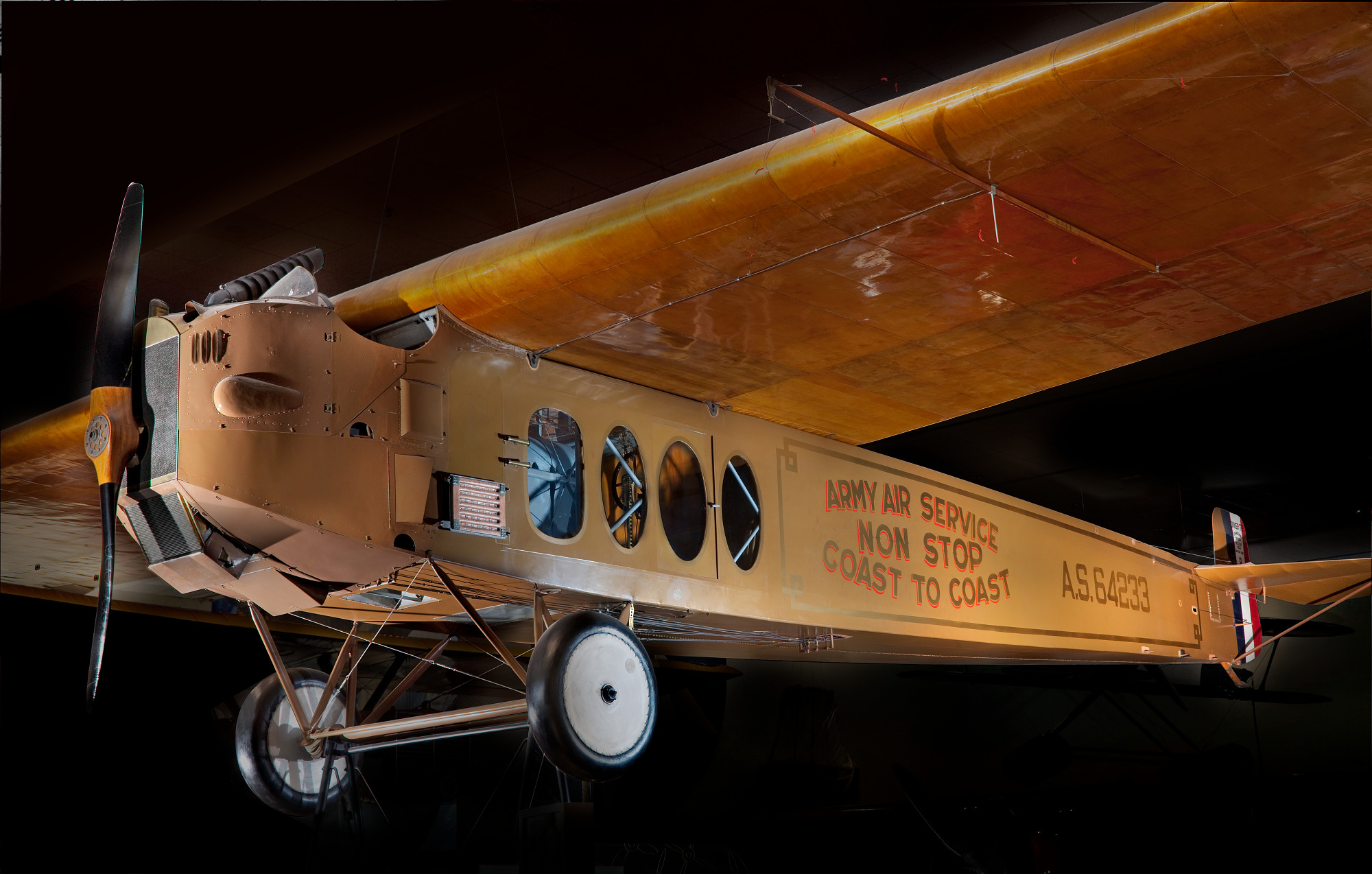
Fokker T-2 – DPLA

- April – (United Kingdom / Iraq) Aircraft of the British Royal Air Force's Iraq Command flew 280 Sikh troops from Kingarban to Kirkuk in the first British air trooping airlift operation.
- May 2–3 – (United States) First U.S. nonstop transcontinental flight – Lts. Oakley G. Kelly and John A. Macready flew a Fokker T-2 nonstop across the U.S. (Roosevelt Field → San Diego area), showing the potential for long-range point-to-point air transport (implications for transcontinental mail/cargo routing and for heavier transport aircraft design).
- May 23 – (Belgium) Sabena started with an airmail / air cargo flight the same day it is founded, flying a De Havilland DH.9 from Haren, Belgium via Ostend to Lympne, United Kingdom.

=== 1924 ===
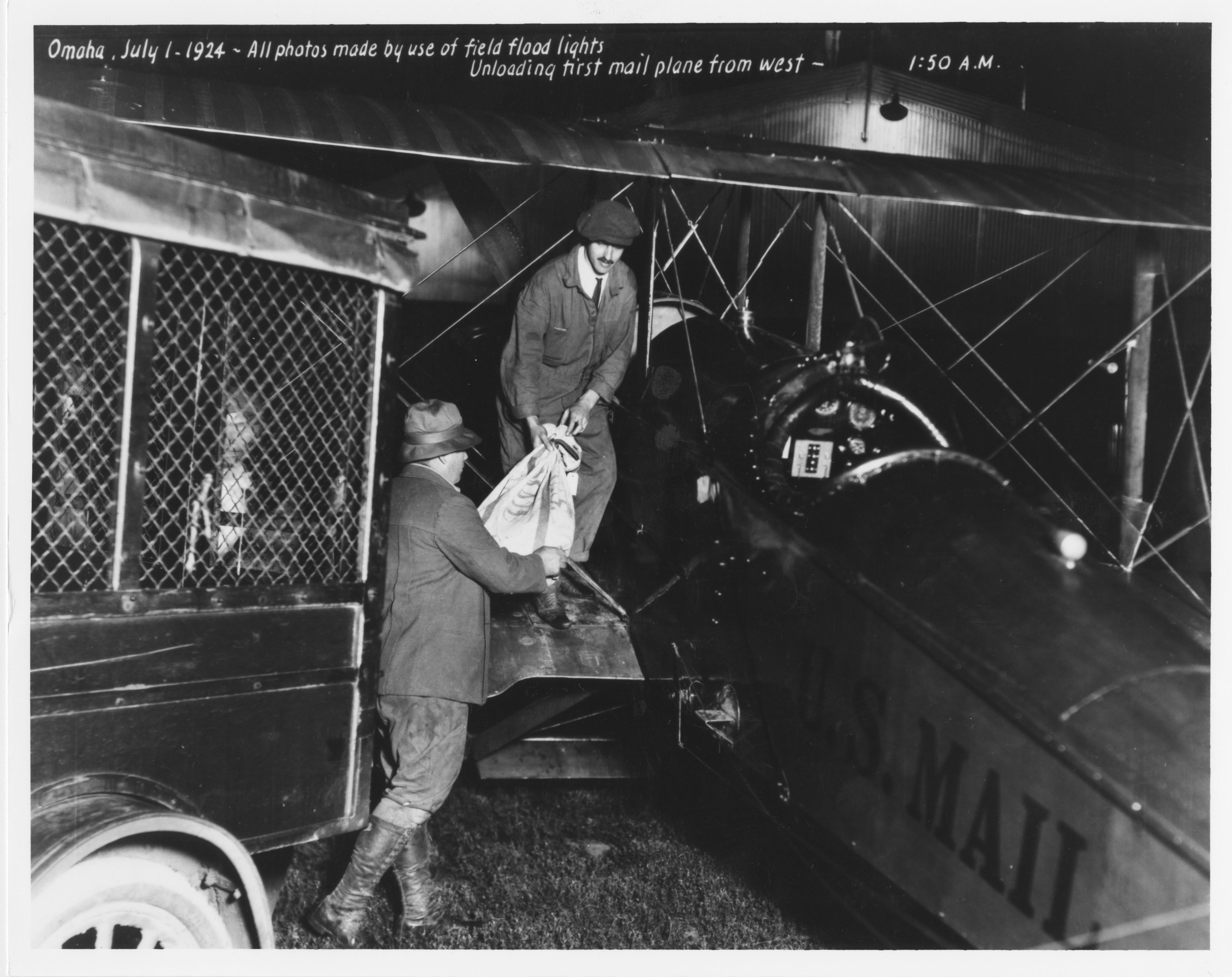
Unloading Airmail in Omaha, Nebraska on July 1, 1924

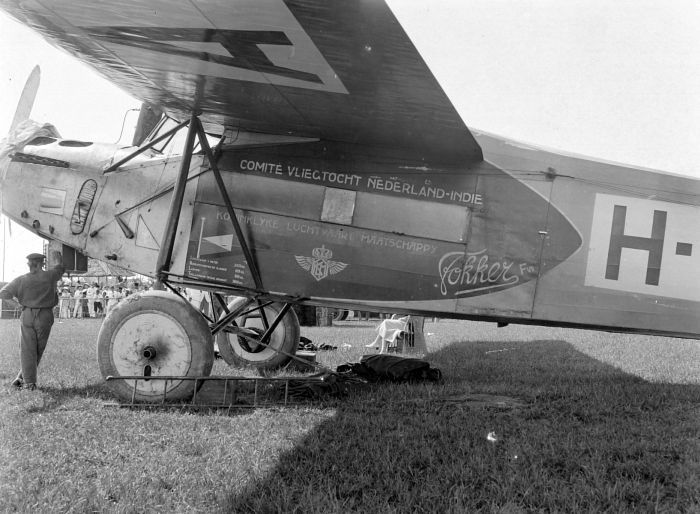
The Fokker VII at the airport in Medan where it was the first aircraft to land on the flight between the Netherlands and the Indies on November 24, 1924

- February – (United States) First air mail in Alaska is flown by Carl Ben Eielson from Fairbanks to McGrath in under 3 hours, a distance dog sleds took up to 30 days to cover.
- Apr 30 – Regular Belfast–Liverpool airmail flights are inaugurated by Alan Cobham, using de Havilland DH.50 craft.
- July 1 – (United States) First U.S. regular airmail with continuous day-and-night services commence, linking Chicago, Illinois, with Cheyenne, Wyoming.
- September 11 – {Canada} First Canadian regular airmail service begins, with Laurentide Air Services linking Haileybury, Ontario, with Rouyn, Quebec.
- October 1 – November 24 – (Netherlands – Indonesia) KLM's first intercontinental test flight to the Dutch East Indies, an intercontinental proving flight from Amsterdam toward Batavia (Jakarta) using a single-engine Fokker F.VII (registration H-NACC) carrying 281 pieces of mail.

=== 1925 ===
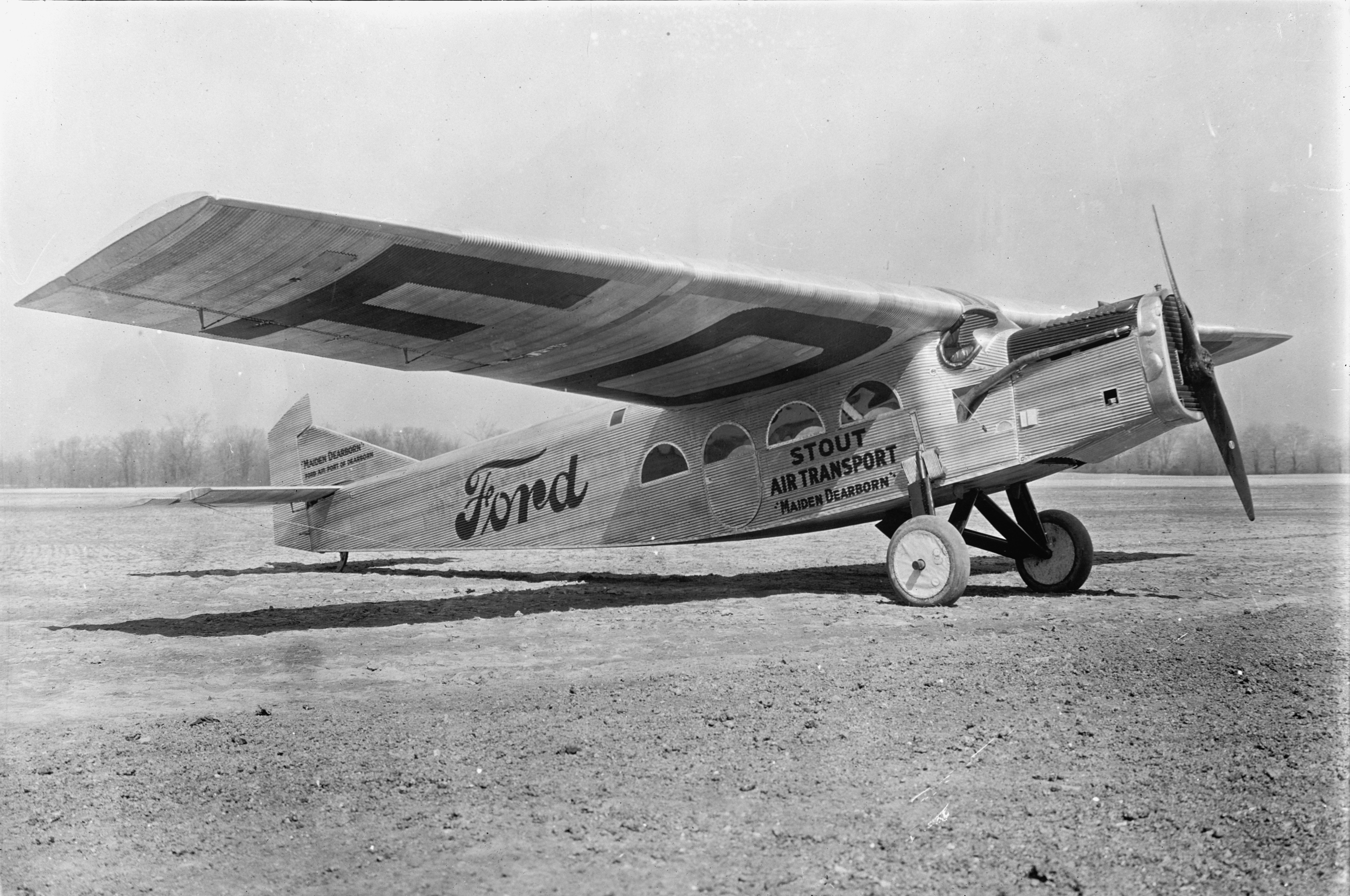
Stout 2AT-2

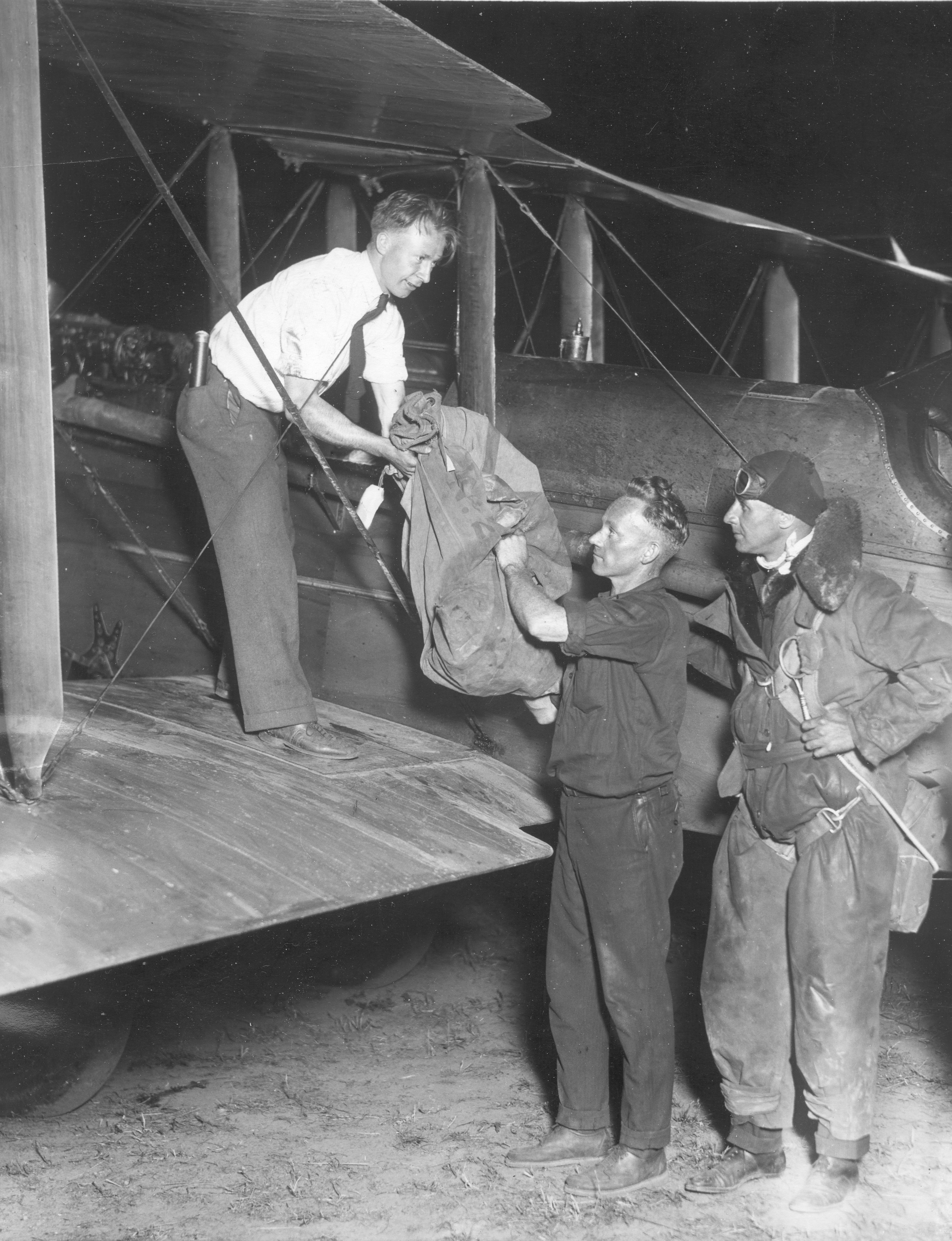
Hadley Field first arrived bag of overnight airmail

- February 2 – (United States) Air Mail Act of 1925 (Kelly Act) passed. U.S. Congress passed the Contract Air Mail Act, permitting the Post Office to contract private companies to carry airmail. This law is widely seen as the legal/financial trigger for commercial airlines; it created the market (paid mail routes) that allowed private carriers and manufacturers to grow.
- April 13 – (United States) First U.S. scheduled air freight service. Henry Ford's Ford Air Transport Service begins scheduled freight flights carrying parts and mail between factories in Detroit and Chicago.
- April 20 – (Japan) First scheduled airmail services in Japan. Seeing the success of the scheduled passenger/cargo airlines started in 1922, the Ministry of Communications began experimental air transport of mail using these routes.
- July 1 – (United States) The United States Post Office Department inaugurates 24-hour transcontinental air mail service. Previously, mailplanes had not flown at night and trains had carried the mail during the hours of darkness, but the completion of a coast-to-coast system of lighted beacons has allowed night flying to become practical along the entire route. The day-and-night flying allows the transcontinental air mail service to deliver mail notably faster than train-only service for the first time.
- November 25 – (United Kingdom-Africa) Imperial Airways starts a route proving flight from London to Cape Town and back.

=== 1926 ===
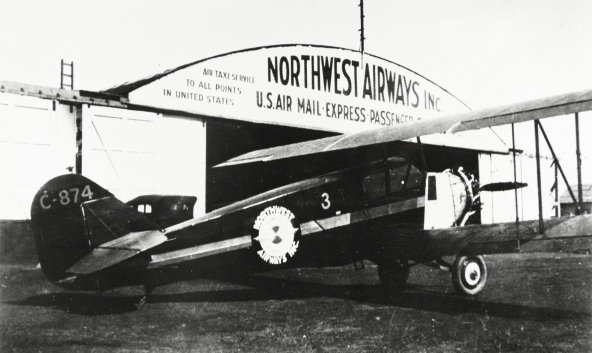
Stinson SB-1 Detroiter NC874 with Northwest Airways Inc

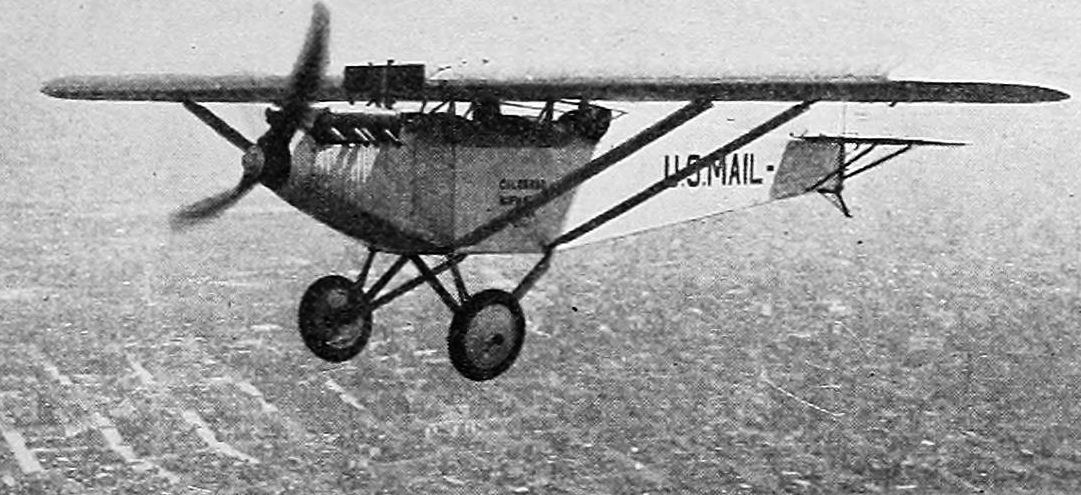
Ryan M-1 Aero Digest December 1926

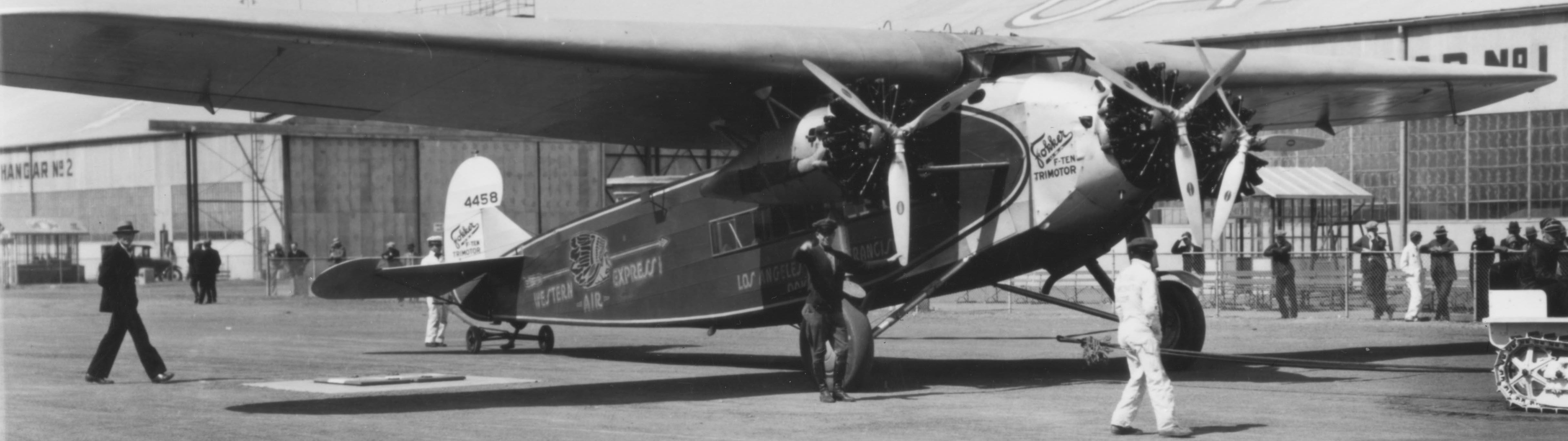
Fokker F-10 Western Air Express (cropped)

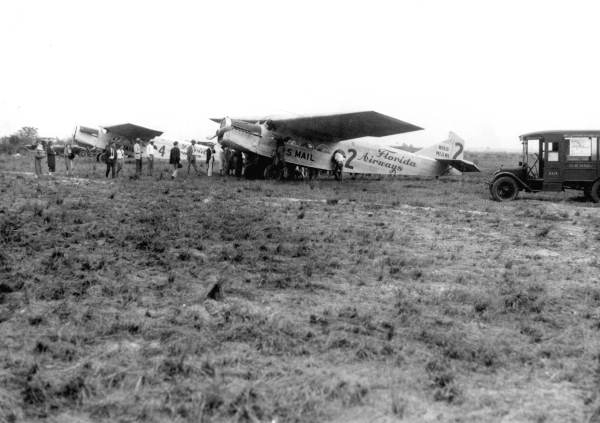
Florida Airways June 1, 1926

- February 12 – (United states) Straying two miles (3.2 km) off course while flying a Curtiss Carrier Pigeon for the United States Post Office on the overnight airmail delivery route from Chicago to New York City, pioneering American pilot Art Smith dies when he crashes into a grove of trees near Montpelier, Ohio. He is the second U.S. overnight mail service pilot to die on duty.
- February 15 – (United States) First commercial contract airmail flights start after the Post Office began turning airmail routes over to private carriers under the 1925 "Kelly Act" (Contract Air Mail / CAM) legislation.
- April 15 – (United States) Charles A. Lindbergh's first contract airmail flight (CAM-2) from Chicago to St. Louis while working as a contract airmail pilot.
- April 17 – (United States) Western Air Express (the future Western Airlines) begins operations with a contract mail flight from Salt Lake City, Utah, to Los Angeles, using a Douglas M-2. The airline will begin passenger services a month later.
- May 20 – (United States) Air Commerce Act signed into law by President Coolidge. This created the first federal framework for civil aviation in the U.S.: pilot/aircraft licensing, safety rules, and the Department of Commerce role in fostering air commerce; a major regulatory milestone that shaped safe, reliable air routes used by mail and cargo carriers.
- June 1 – (United States) Florida Airways established the first daily air passenger service in the United States to be operated over a Federal air mail contract route. Stout 2-AT Pullman "Miss Miami"
- June 30 – (United Kingdom-Australia) Imperial Airways starts a route proving flight from Rochester, Kent to Melbourne and back.
- July 6 – the single mailbag in the 1926 KLM Fokker F.VII crash survives the crash undamaged.
- December 27 – (United Kingdom-India) Imperial Airways starts a route proving flight from Croydon to Karachi and Delhi.

=== 1927 ===
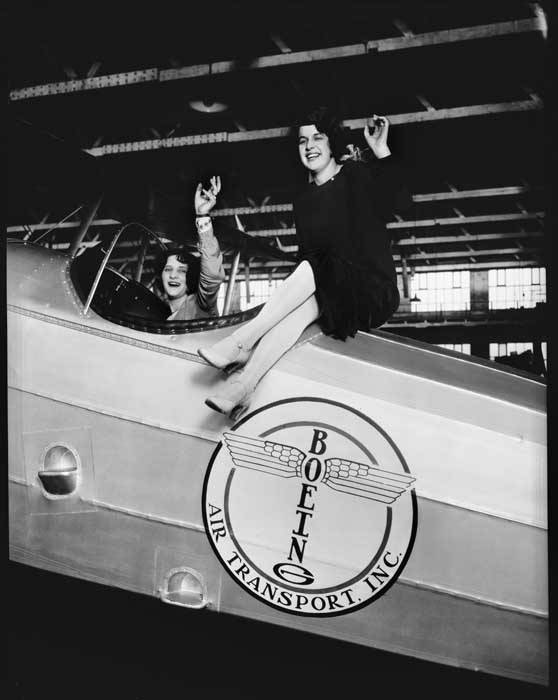
Two women and a Boeing mail plane, ca 1927

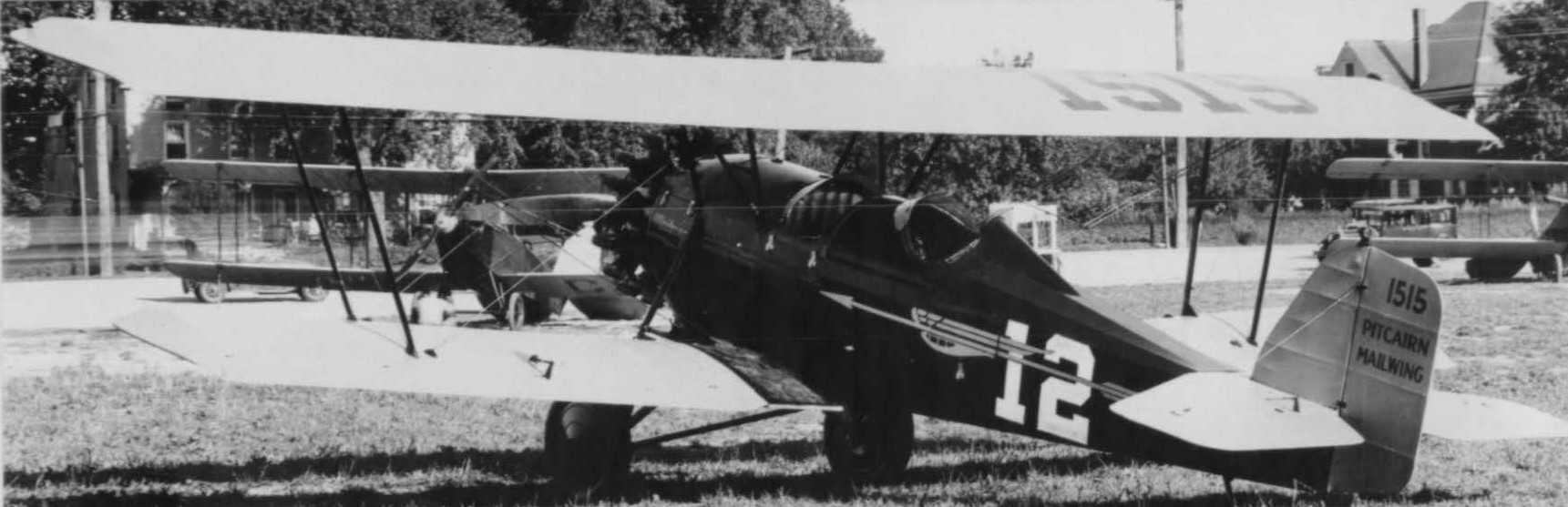
Pitcairn Mailwing PA-5 left rear photo

- Undated – (United States) American Railway Express contracts a group of small airlines, delivering 45,859 pounds of air freight that year.
- Undated – (United States) The United States Marine Corps demonstrates an early aerial pickup system for dispatches. A modified First World War-era de Havilland DH-4 biplane trailed a weighted cable behind the aircraft, which engaged a rope loop suspended between two poles on the ground. The system enabled the aircraft to retrieve a leather pouch containing mail or dispatches without landing, representing one of the earliest practical experiments in airborne cargo and mail recovery.
- May 5 – (France) The Société Générale des Transports Aériens Farman F.61 cargo aircraft F-ADFN disappears over the Atlantic Ocean during a flight from Saint-Louis Airport in Saint-Louis, Senegal, to Petrolina Airport in Petrolina, Brazil. Its two crew members are never found.
- May 20–21 – (United States – France) Charles Lindbergh's solo New York City to Paris flight with the "Spirit of St. Louis" made aviation a mass-media phenomenon ("the Lindbergh Boom"), raised public & investor interest in commercial air transport and airmail, and helped accelerate expansion of passenger and mail services worldwide.
- July 1 – (United States – France) First official transatlantic airmail by Richard E. Byrd, Bernt Balchen and two others flying the civilian-owned Fokker C-2 America (NX206), crash-landing off the coast of France.
- September 1 –
  - (United States) U.S. air mail is now fully operational under commercial contracts (CAM system completed) after the Kelly Act (1925) and ensuing awards – the U.S. Post Office had transitioned the last government-flown transcontinental mail to commercial Contract Air Mail carriers.
  - (United States) National Air Transport flies its first air cargo between Dallas and New York City.
- October 26 – (Peru) First airmail service into the Peruvian Amazon from Lima to San Ramón, flown with two Keystone Prontos of the Peruvian Navy, piloted by Leonardo Alvariño Herr and Harold B. Grow.
- November 7 – (United States) National Air Transport is awarded CAM3.

=== 1928 ===
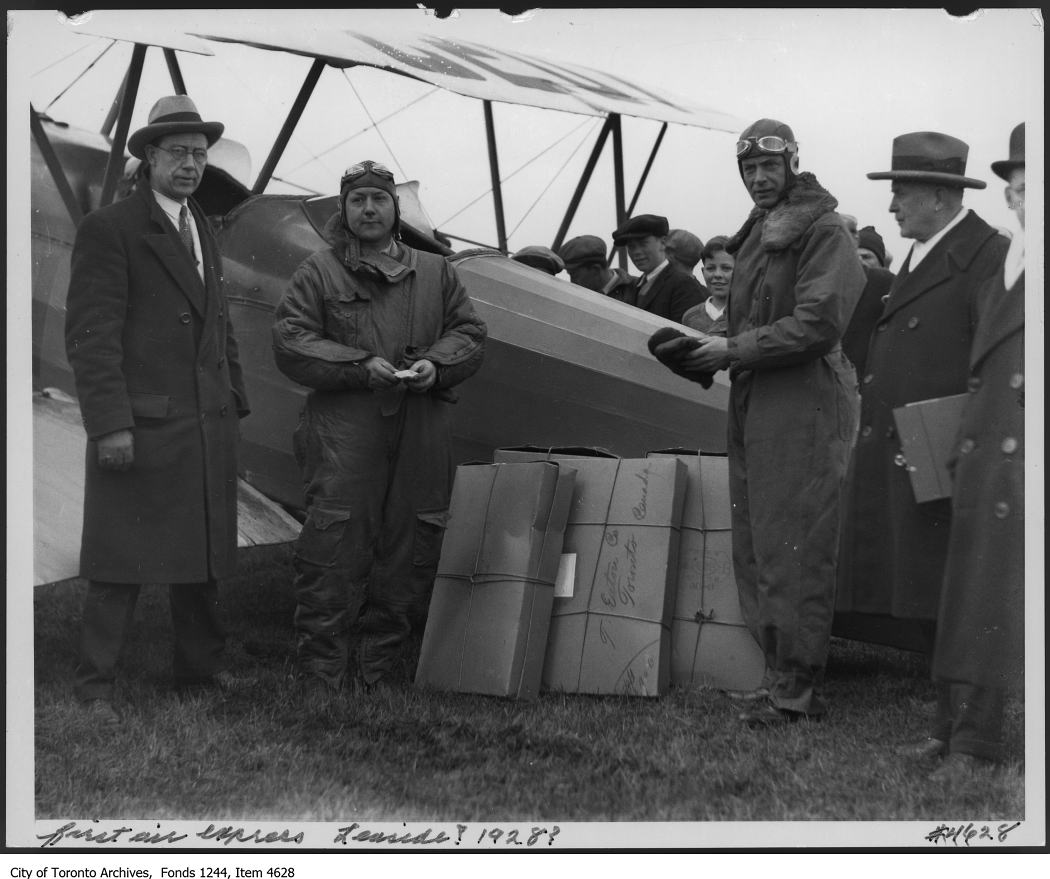
Leaside aerodrome, first regular airmail delivery

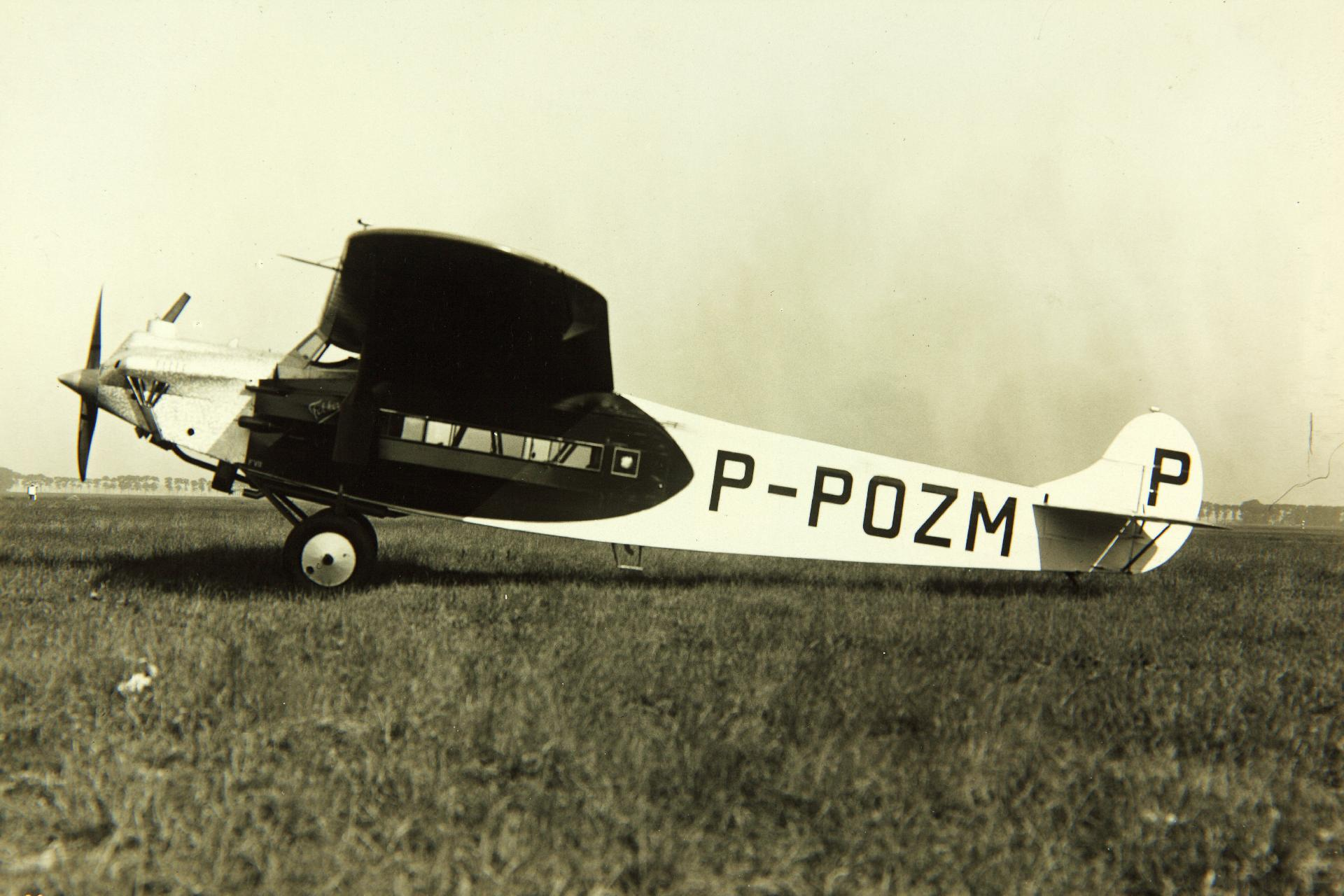
Fokker F.VIIa P-POZM with Lorraine 12Eb engine

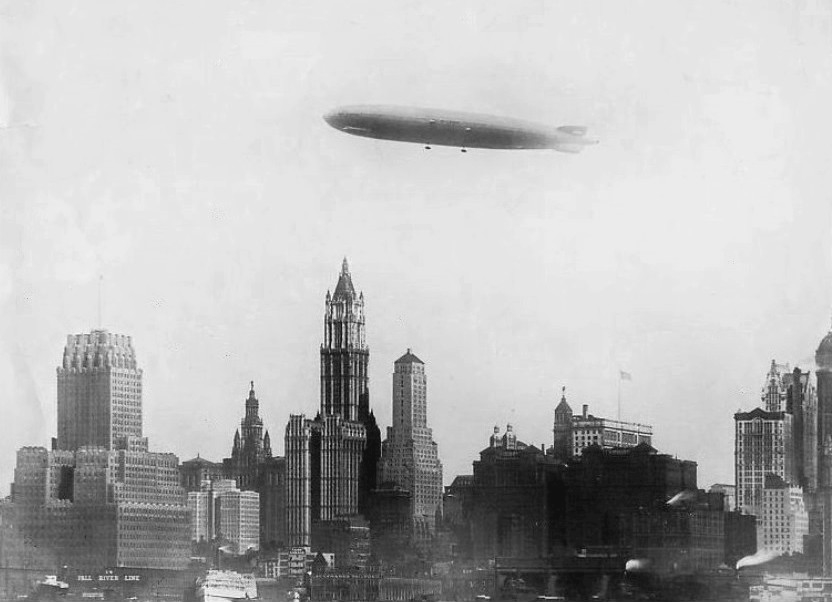
Graf Zeppelin over New York City 1928

- February 20 – (Cuba) Havana (Pan-American) Convention on Commercial Aviation finalized to set out early rules for commercial aviation among American states (sovereignty, freedoms, etc.), helping to clear the way for international air services (including airmail/cargo) across the Americas.
- March 8 – (United States) The Foreign Airmail Act broadened the authority of the United States Post Office Department in the field of international airmail. The legislation authorized the Post Office to enter into contracts, lasting up to ten years, for the transportation of mail between the United States and foreign countries or U.S. insular territories.
- May 17 – (United States) An amendment to the Air Mail Act of 1925 allowed air carriers that had satisfactorily operated mail routes for at least two years to exchange their existing contracts for air mail route certificates with terms of up to ten years. The amendment was intended to safeguard airline investments in aircraft and equipment, whose service life exceeded that of the original short-term contracts. During this period, airmail contracts represented the principal source of revenue for most U.S. airlines.
- July 17 – (United States) Thompson Aeronautical Corporation (TAC) won Contract Air Mail route 27 (CAM 27) from the U.S. Post Office, servicing the Chicago-Muskegon-Bay City-Pontiac, MI, route, starting service on July 17, 1928, with 6 Stinson Detroiter aircraft.
- September 18 – (Germany – United states) First flight of the LZ 127 Graf Zeppelin followed by first transatlantic commercial/airship flight and airmail delivery in October.
- October 28 – (United States) Pan American opened regular services from Key West to Havana using Fokker FVIIa landplanes.
- December 4 – (United States) The Aeronautics Branch issued regulations governing the entry and clearance procedures for aircraft transporting foreign cargo and passengers into the United States. The regulations took effect on February 1, 1929.
- December 12–14 – (United States) International Civil Aeronautics Conference (Washington, D.C.), a high-level international conference convened (with Presidential involvement) to evaluate civil aviation's progress and future – helped set global attention (and some technical/policy exchange) around standards, safety and international cooperation that would shape future airmail and commercial air services.
- December 23 – February 29, 1929 – (United Kingdom / Afghanistan-India) During the Kabul airlift of 1928-1929, the RAF conducted a long-range non-combat air evacuation of British Embassy staff from Afghanistan to India using seven Vickers Victoria aircraft, one Handley Page Hinaidi, 24 Airco DH.9As and two Westland Wapitis.

=== 1929 ===
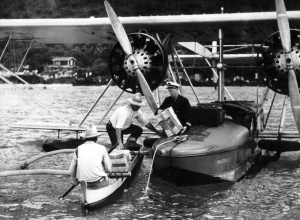
Inter-Island Airways (Hawaiian Airlines) Sikorsky S-38 on the bay at Kona, Hawaii

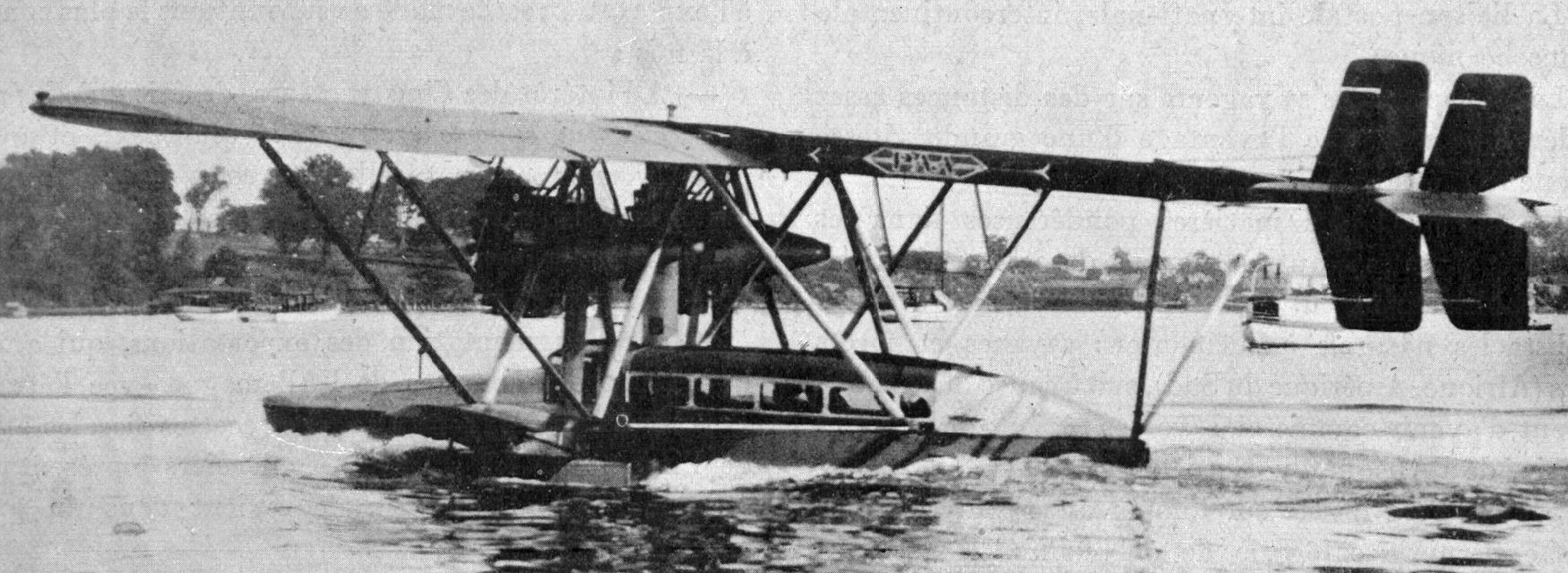
Sikorsky S-38 Pan American Airways L'Aéronautique March,1929

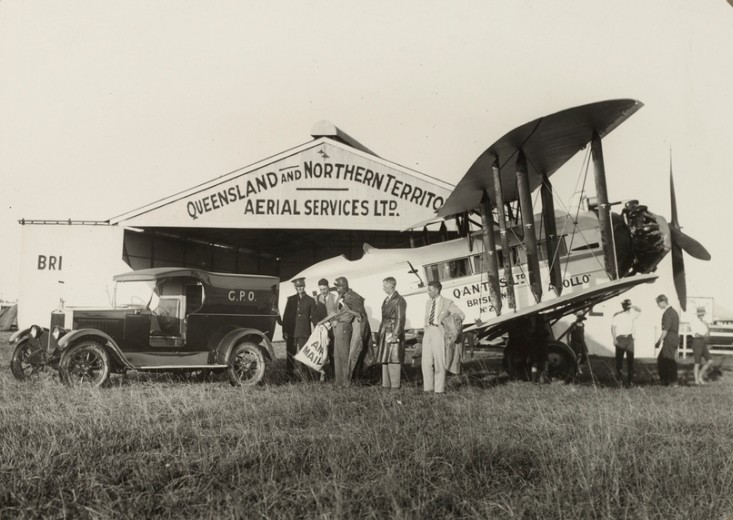
DH.61 Apollo Airmail 1929

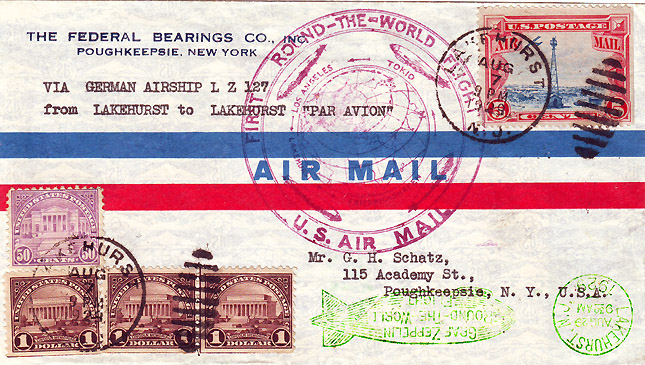
DLZ127 Round the World 1929

- Undated – (Canada) First official airmail delivery by bush pilot to the District of Mackenzie in Canada's western Arctic.
- Undated – (United States) The country's first cargo handling warehouse Hangar No. 1 opens at Los Angeles airport LAX.
- Undated – (United States) First UPS air service. The air cargo business of the United Parcel Service began in 1929. At first, UPS shipped packages as baggage on commercial airline flights on the West Coast of the United States. After Black Tuesday and the beginning of the Great Depression, UPS discontinued the air freight service by late 1931.
- Undated – (Mexico) Pan Am subsidiary Compañía Mexicana de Aviación (CMA) started Air Express operations in Mexico.
- February – (United States – Panama) Charles Lindbergh piloted Sikorsky S-38 operations for Pan Am in February 1929, inaugurating key Miami – Cristóbal (in the Panama Canal Zone) airmail/passenger operations. Pan Am rapidly secured Pan-American air-mail routes and by mid-1929 was moving scheduled airmail south into Colombia/Peru/Chile, creating persistent air-mail supply lines across the Americas.
- March 30 – (United Kingdom) Imperial Airways inaugurated its first through service from Croydon, England to India. By December of the same year, the route had been extended beyond Karachi to include Jodhpur and Delhi.
- April 1 –
  - (Japan) The Japan Air Transport Corporation (JAT) began scheduled airmail and air cargo services.
  - (United States) Thompson Aeronautical Corporation (TAC) opened an overnight mail route from Bay City to Cleveland, via Detroit.
- April 23 – (Australia) The first airmail to Brisbane by Qantas, using a de Havilland DH.61 'Apollo' aircraft. This marked a milestone in Australian aviation, establishing a regular airmail service to the city from other Qantas routes.
- July 22 – (Germany) Deutsche Luft Hansa uses a catapult to launch a Heinkel He 12 mail plane from the passenger liner Bremen, 400 km (250 mi); 216 nautical miles out from New York City, speeding the mail on its way before the ship reaches port.
- August 8 – September – (Germany) LZ 127 Graf Zeppelin round-the-world flight carrying souvenir/official mail. The rigid airship Graf Zeppelin departed Lakehurst August 8, 1929, on its celebrated circumnavigation; part of the trip's financing and public interest came from carriage of souvenir and official airmail on the entire circuit (Lakehurst – Friedrichshafen – Tokyo – Los Angeles – Lakehurst). This flight is one of the iconic 1920s "air-post" spectacles – enormous mail and philatelic interest.
- October 21 – (China) China Airways Federal launched an airmail and passenger service with an inaugural flight from Shanghai to Hankou.

== Airlines, companies and organizations founded ==
This decade, the following airlines or air cargo related companies or organizations were founded that were or would become important for air cargo and airmail history:

=== 1920 ===
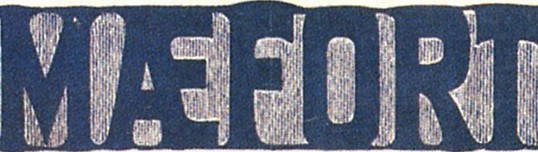
Maefort logo, 1920

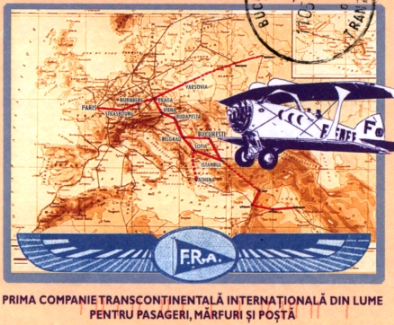
Compagnie franco-roumaine de navigation aérienne (CFRNA), Poster

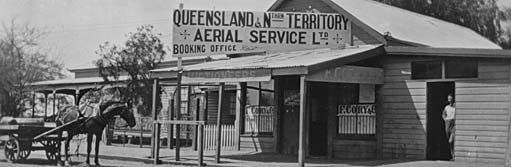
The early office of QANTAS, between 1920 and 1930

- Undated – (Hungary) Maefort, or Magyar Aeroforgalmi Rt. (Hungarian Air Transport Joint Stock Company) – initially founded to carry mail. The company added passenger services in 1921.
- Undated – (Belgian Congo) Ligne Aérienne du Roi Albert (LARA) – a short-lived colonial airline (1920–1922) set up to exploit an aerial route along the Congo River using Levy Lepen hydroplanes. LARA carried ~2 tonnes of mail during its short existence and opened long riverine legs where ground infrastructure was absent.
- Undated – (New Zealand) Mount Cook Airline – had its origins NZ Aero Transport Co. in Timaru, which later evolved into Mount Cook Air Services and Mount Cook Airline (a regional NZ operator until merged into Air New Zealand in 2019). The early company ran sightseeing and local passenger/freight routes and helped pioneer regional air access (including carrying freight/mail in rural New Zealand).
- January – (Norway) A/S Aero – a short-lived Norwegian firm founded by Tancred Ibsen, operating demonstration, advertising and limited mail flights in summer 1920 from the Oslo area.
- January 1 – (France) CFRNA (Compagnie Franco-roumaine de navigation aérienne) – a French–Romanian airline that operated Paris ↔ Central / Eastern Europe routes and later renamed CIDNA (and eventually merged into Air France in 1933). CFRNA provided passenger, mail and cargo services on transcontinental European routes (Paris – Bucharest via key stops). It's often described as the first operative transcontinental airline in aviation history.
- November 16 – (Australia) Qantas (Queensland and Northern Territory Aerial Services Ltd.) – founded in Winton, Queensland; later grew into Australia's flag carrier. Qantas began as a regional operator connecting remote communities in the Australian interior and performed early mail/passenger duties across the outback, Australia's sparsely settled areas.

=== 1921 ===
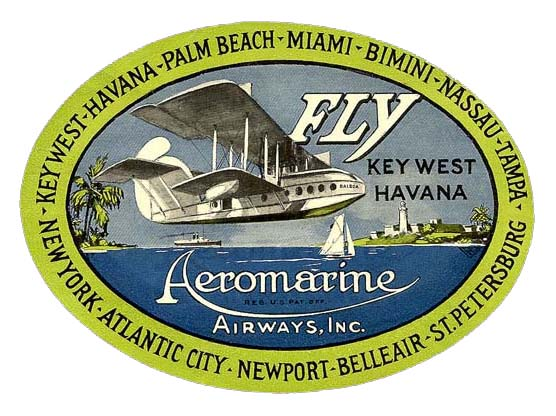
Aeromarine baggage label, 1921

- Undated – (Estonia) Aeronaut (A-S Aeronaut) ; Aeronaut – the first Estonian airline, operating international/regional routes from Tallinn (Tallinn–Helsinki, Tallinn–Stockholm, Tallinn–Riga–Königsberg and domestic lines). By creating scheduled international links from 1921 onward it helped integrate Estonia into early Northern/ Baltic airmail networks.
- Undated Spring – (United States) Aeromarine West Indies Airways – founded / reorganized: reorganized as Aeromarine Airways in spring 1921 (original company began 1920; organized operations through 1921). The airline transported passengers, mail and freight beginning in 1921 and is credited as one of the first U.S. international airlines to carry U.S. airmail and express cargo (Key West–Havana services). It's noteworthy as an early U.S. international mail/cargo carrier and as one of the "first total-service" airlines (passenger + mail + express).
- May 10 – (Poland) Aerotarg (Poznań Airline Society "Aero-Targ") – established to serve the Poznań International Fair and carried airmail for the Polish Post (special stamps issued). Its short-lived operations nevertheless included regular Poznań–Warsaw and Poznań–Danzig flights, transporting about 3,000 kg of parcels during the fair. Ceased operations June 16, 1921.
- July 12 – (Mexico) Mexicana de Aviación (Compañía Mexicana de Aviación) – Mexico's first airline and one of the world's oldest single-brand carriers. Mexicana developed domestic and international routes and later operated a dedicated cargo subsidiary (Mexicana Cargo, noted in historical records for the 1980s). As Mexico's primary early carrier it was a major conduit for domestic airmail and later for scheduled freight/cargo operations in the country and region. Ceased operations August 28, 2010.
- November 24 – (Germany – Russia) Deruluft (Deutsch-Russische Luftverkehrs A.G.), a German–Soviet joint airline – a formal international air carrier connecting Germany and Soviet Russia – initially focused on official passengers and postal traffic.
- December 5 – (Australia) Western Australian Airways, renamed West Australian Airways 1926 - founded by Norman Brearley. The company bid for and received government subsidised air-mail & passenger contracts in 1921 and later won Australia's first interstate airmail contract (Perth–Adelaide in 1928/1929). It was Australia's first scheduled airline and a pioneer in using aircraft for rural/long-distance mail and freight distribution.

=== 1922 ===
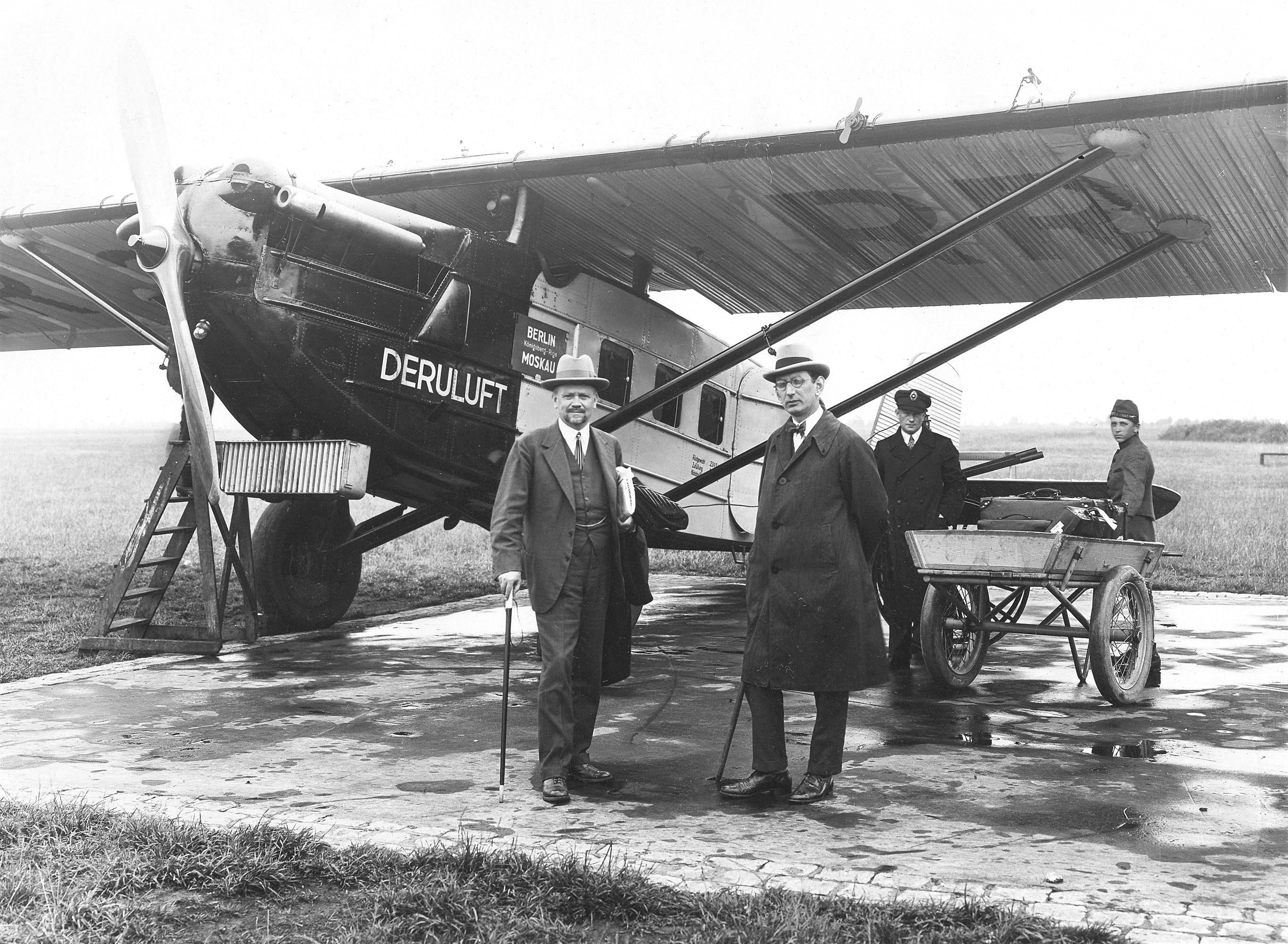
Dornier Mercur of Deruluft at the inauguration of Stettin Airstrip in 1927. From left Swedish communications minister Carl Meurling and Stockholm vice-mayor Yngve Larsson.

- June – (United States) Model Airways – an experimental scheduled flight service operated by the U.S. Army Air Service. It served as a pilot program to demonstrate the feasibility of military and commercial air transport within the United States. The program was designed to test the logistics of moving personnel and cargo on fixed schedules, establishing a precursor to modern operational support airlift. Service began between Bolling Field (Washington, D.C.) and McCook Field (Dayton, Ohio), and quickly grew to encompass a network of 10 airfields, including Scott Field in Illinois and bases in Texas. The service primarily used modified de Havilland DH-4 biplanes, which were two-seater aircraft originally built for combat during World War I. In total by 1926 over 1.2 million miles were flown, and more than 1,200 passengers and approximately 62,000 pounds of cargo were carried. The program was disbanded in 1926 following the passage of the Air Commerce Act, which restricted government agencies from competing with private aviation enterprises. The Model Airways is considered the first large-scale scheduled airline service in the U.S. and a foundational model for national airway networks, but also it allowed the Army to develop standard procedures for cross-country flying, including the use of landing fields, beacons, and aeronautical charts.
- June 3 – (Poland) Aerolot (Polska Linja Lotnicza / Aerolloyd) – the first regular airline in the Polish lands and built Poland's early scheduled route network (Danzig–Warsaw–Lwów and later other links). Aerolot became the nucleus of the later national carrier LOT.
- July 31 – (Latvia / Germany) Latvijas Gaisa Satiksmes Akciju Sabiedriba (Latvian–German airline) – founded as a Junkers-backed regional operator flying international services in the Baltic region and carried freight and mail on its Osteuropa/Union routes. It was part of the early European web of scheduled services that transported passengers, cargo and postal consignments between capitals.
- November 19 – (Hungary) Malert (Magyar Légiforgalmi R.T.) – established Hungary's scheduled air links in the 1920s (Budapest – Vienna / Belgrade / Warsaw / Prague etc.) and was the principal Hungarian inter-capital operator in the interwar years; those scheduled services were used for mail and light cargo as part of state and commercial postal arrangements.

=== 1923 ===
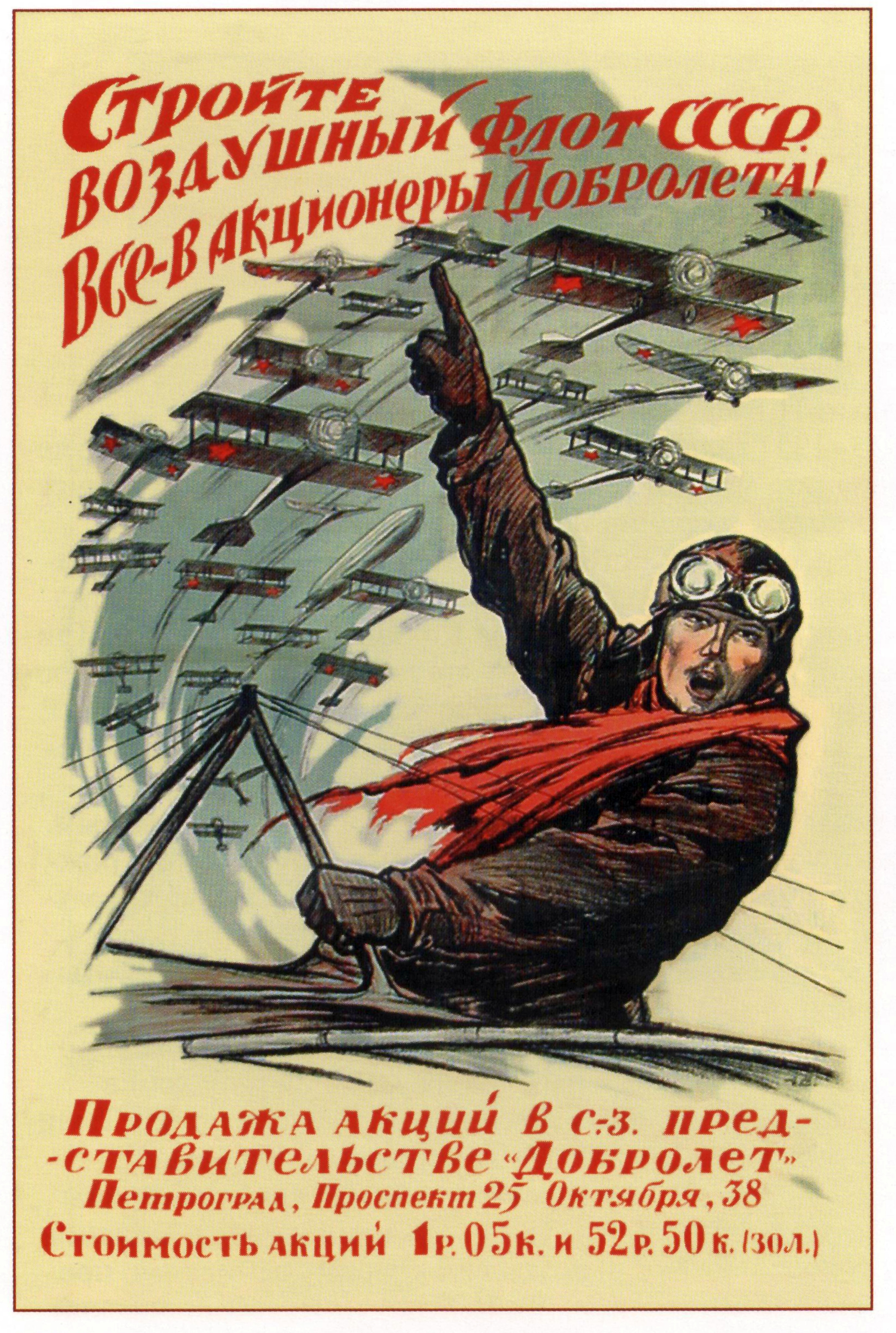
A poster calling for Soviet citizens to buy stock in Dobrolyot

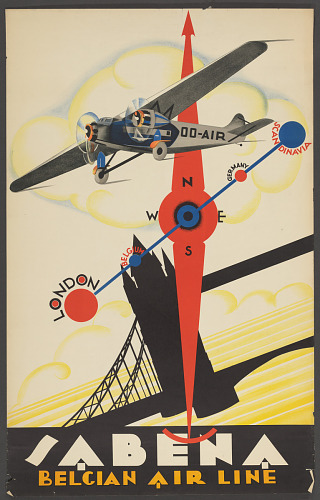
Sabena Belgian Air Line poster from the 1930s

- Undated – (United Kingdom) British Marine Air Navigation Co. Ltd. – a short-lived early UK operator with marine/floatplane focus and carried both passengers and mail, though it is best known for its passenger services. The company began operating the world's first scheduled flying boat service in 1923, with flights to Cherbourg, Le Havre, and the Channel Islands.
- Undated – (United States) Florida Airways – an early U.S. regional carrier that later participated in the CAM (Commercial Air Mail) era.
- January 1 – (France) Air Union – one of the main French operators of the 1920s that carried passengers, mail and freight on domestic and international routes; its network and equipment later became part of the national consolidation that formed Air France in 1933, which carried major airmail and air-freight contracts.
- March – (Soviet Union) Dobrolyot (precursor of Aeroflot) – established in the Soviet Union as the Russian Society of Volunteer Air Fleet; its charter explicitly included mail and cargo services and airport/weather-station construction.
- March 16 – (United States) Bee Line – reorganised in 1926 as Colonial Air Transport and won/operated CAM airmail routes in the U.S. (CAM-1 and other early subsidized airmail routes).
- May 23 – (Belgium) Sabena (Société anonyme belge d'Exploitation de la Navigation aérienne) – the Belgian national flag carrier created to take over the pioneering SNETA services. Sabena carried international and colonial mail/cargo (and later freight) across Europe and to Belgian colonies.
- June – (Soviet Union) Ukrpovitroshliakh / Ukrvozdukhput – the first USSR regional airline; one of the early Soviet carriers running passenger and mail/cargo services.
- October 6 – (Czechoslovakia) Czechoslovak Airlines (ČSA) – one of the oldest continuously operating carriers (until recent cessation). ČSA began with domestic Prague–Bratislava services and quickly took on government postal/transport tasks – essential to establishing reliable domestic air mail and later international cargo/passenger links in Central Europe.
- November 1 – (Finland) Finnair – founded as Aero O/Y with first operations and early flights following in 1924. Early operations used Junkers F.13 floatplanes and carried mail as well as passengers.
- December – (Italy) Aero Espresso Italiana (AEI) – ran international routes in the eastern Mediterranean (Brindisi–Athens–Istanbul / Rhodes) and operated flying-boat services that carried international airmail as well as passengers.

=== 1924 ===
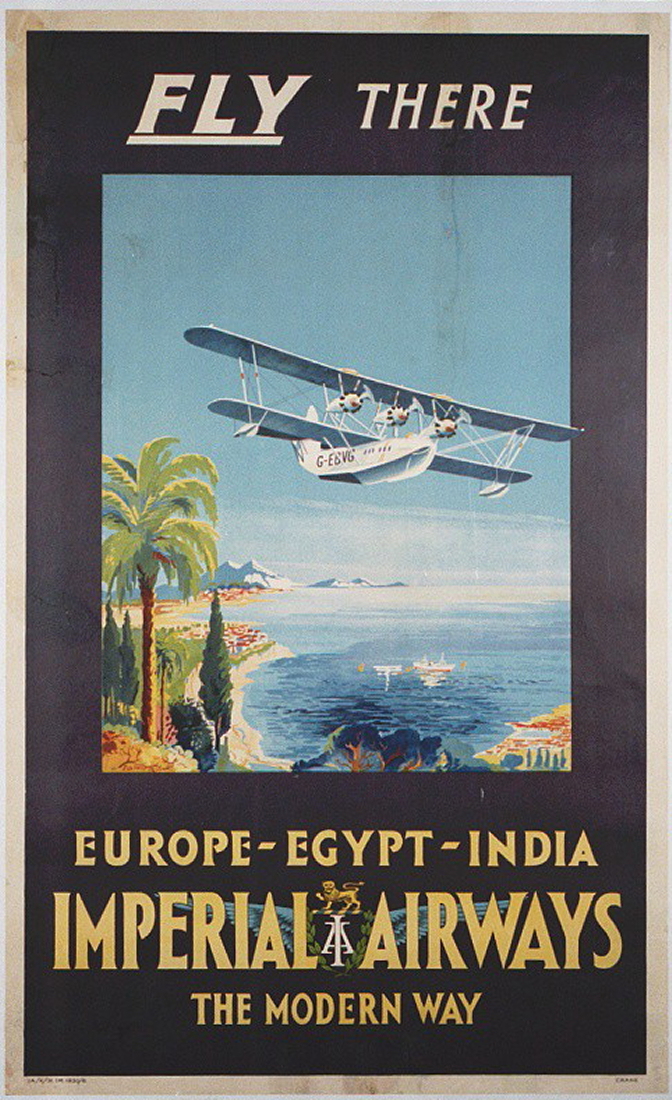
Imperial Airways Fly There Poster

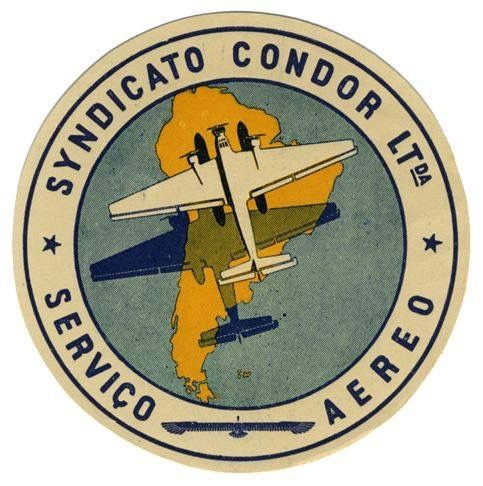
Logo of Syndicato Condor Lda., Brazilian airline (1927–1943)

- Undated – (United States) Johnson Flying Service – one of the oldest U.S. mountain/supplemental carriers; although not primarily an airmail carrier, it provided early commercial air services in remote regions (charter, freight, later forest-service support).
- Undated – (Slovakia) Slov-Air – began as a corporate/utility flying section (Bata) in 1924; historically focused on agricultural, utility and later helicopter/medical work rather than scheduled airmail it had limited direct impact on early international airmail systems but was notable for specialised cargo/utility aviation in Czechoslovakia/Slovakia.
- March 27 – (Sweden) AB Aerotransport (ABA) – an early Swedish national carrier which quickly established international and regional routes and began carrying mail (Stockholm–Helsinki and later mail links to Amsterdam/London).
- March 31 – (United Kingdom) Imperial Airways Limited – a merged airline, formed with equipment, assets and routes from each contributing concern: British Marine Air Navigation Co Ltd, the Daimler Airway, Handley Page Transport Ltd and the Instone Air Line Ltd., following a 1923 government committee recommendation that the main British airlines should merge, to establish one, financially strong, airline, and to enable it to undertake the necessary expansions.
- May 5 – (Germany / South America) Condor Syndikat (German trade/air operations, active 1924–1927) – a German venture operating in South America, carrying passengers and mail on early Rio–Porto Alegre services and helped establish German airline commercial interests.
- September 3 – (Tajikistan) Tajik Air – the first regular airline service in (what is now) Tajikistan – crucial for connecting remote mountain settlements where surface transport was slow or impossible; airmail and small cargo delivery to highland valleys were immediate and lasting uses of these routes.

=== 1925 ===
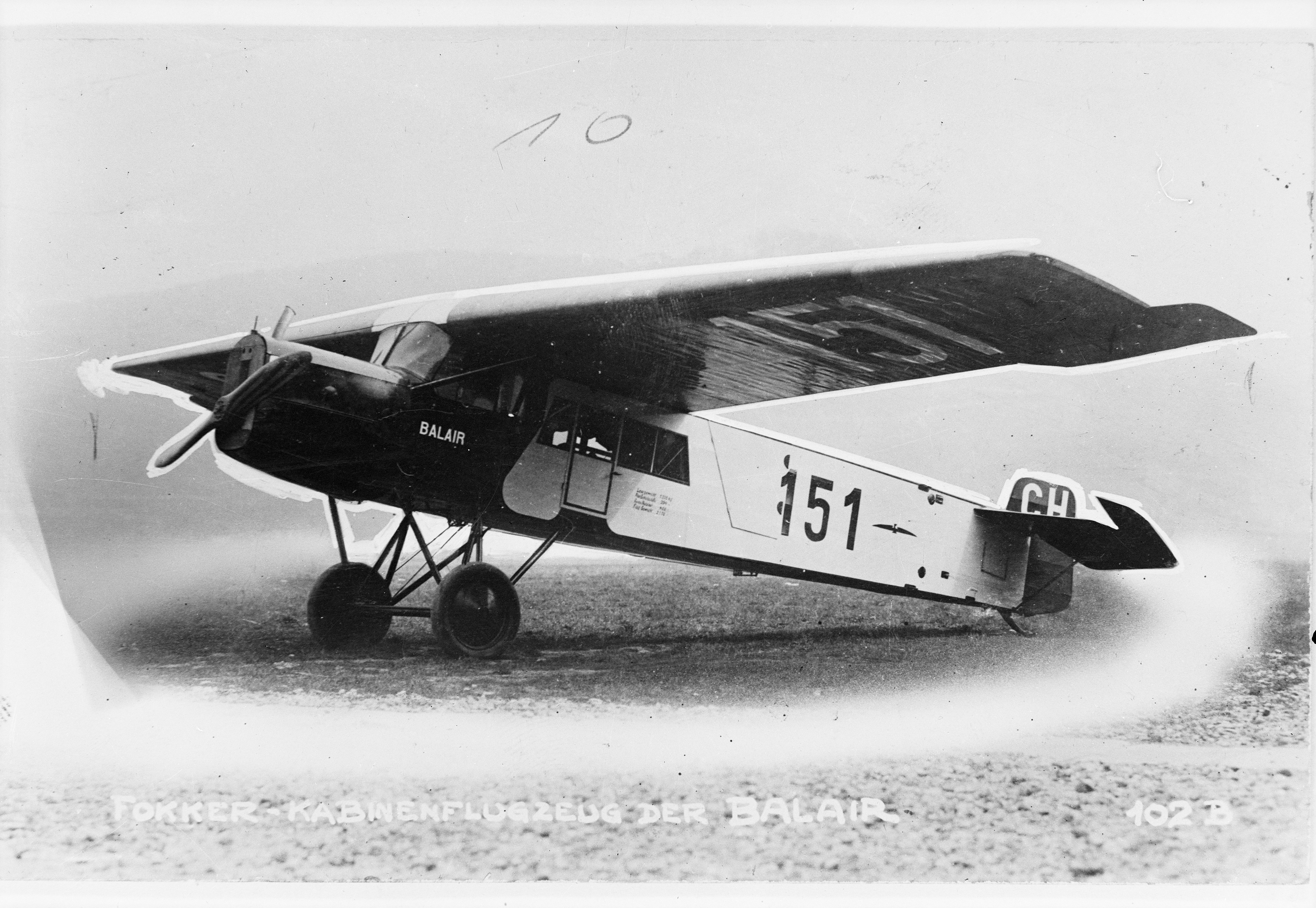
Fokker-Grulich F.II of the Swiss airline Balair, with Swiss registration CH-151, 1926 . This aircraft was converted from a Fokker-built F.II by Deutsche Aero Lloyd's technical manager Karl Grulich and had a 230 hp (170 kW) BMW IV engine. (Photo has been manually retouched.)

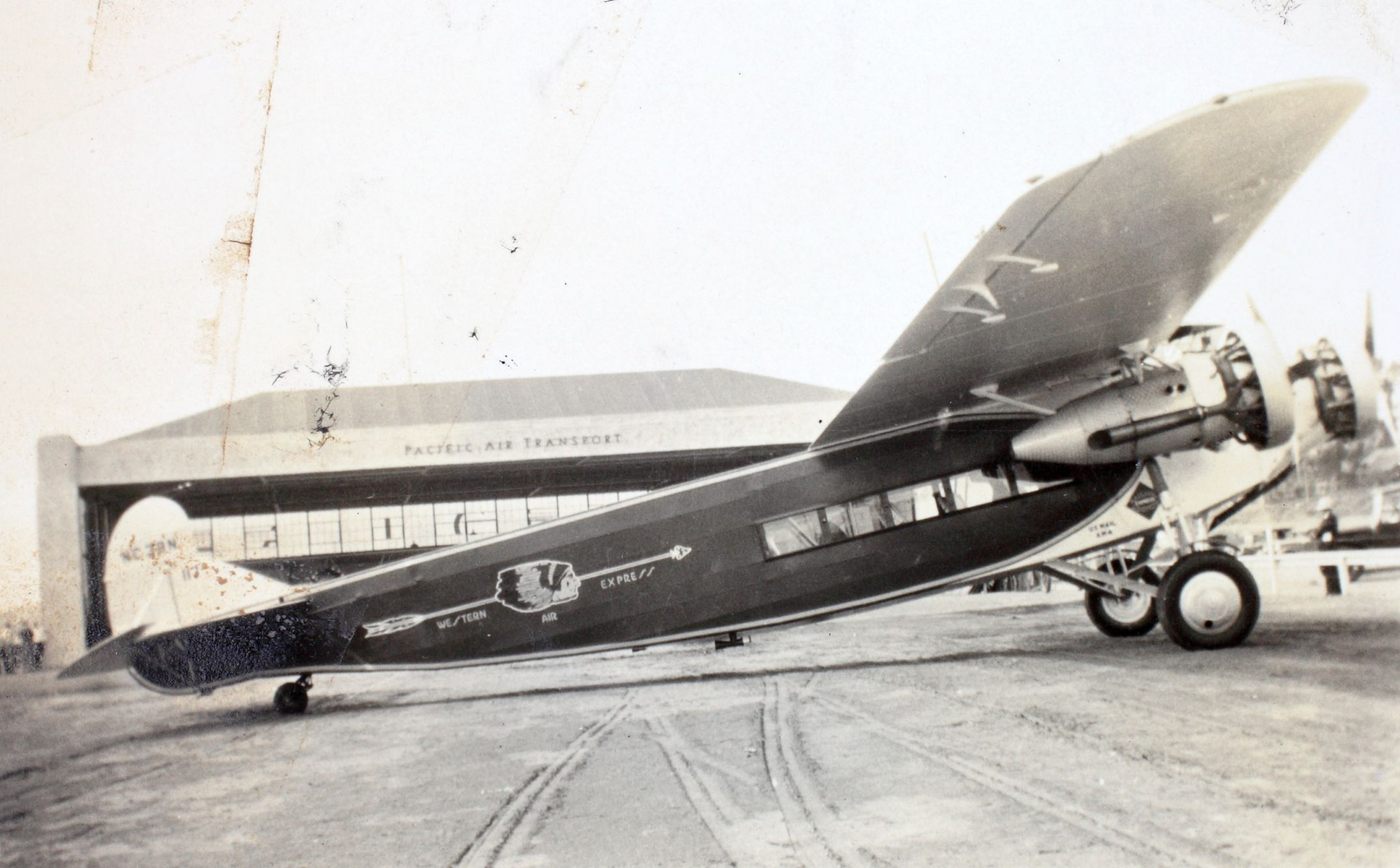
Western Air Express Fokker F.10 side

- Undated – (China) Eurasia Aviation Corporation – a Chinese airline headquartered in Shanghai. The company had a Sino-German joint-venture with Deutsche Luft Hansa. Eurasia, classified as a state-owned airline by the Ministry of Communications of China, operated the Junkers W33 and, later, the three-engined Junkers Ju 52.The main fleet base was Hong Kong. It carried passengers, mail, and cargo.
- Undated – (Switzerland) Belair / Balair – the early Balair (Balair I) operated seasonal services and performed government-subsidized routes that included mail carriage; by 1930 it had already carried passengers, cargo and notable quantities of mail (32–143 tons reported in early years).
- Undated – (United States) Ford Air Transport Service – founded by Henry Ford is often cited as the first regularly scheduled commercial cargo airline in the U.S. — Ford used Stout 2-AT / early Ford Trimotors to carry parts and mail between factories and to operate scheduled freight runs.
- Undated – (United States) Stout Air Services – founded by William B. Stout, closely linked to Stout (and Ford) aircraft production. It was one of the earliest regularly scheduled passenger carriers in the U.S. and carried mail/cargo on early routes. Stout's operations and aircraft (Stout 2-AT and later the Stout 3-AT which developed into the Ford Trimotor) were used on airmail and freight services.
- January 19 – (Italy) Società Anonima Navigazione Aerea (SANA) – founded in Genoa as an Italian seaplane operator concentrating on western Mediterranean routes (Genoa–Rome–Naples–Palermo and international links). It carried passengers and postal shipments by flying boat – an important element in Mediterranean airmail and freight in the interwar period. Merged into Ala Littoria in 1934.
- February – (Poland) Towarzystwo Komunikacji Lotniczej Aero (Aero S.A.) – one of the Polish carriers of the mid-1920s carrying passengers and mail; Aero later merged into the national consolidation that formed LOT Polish Airlines.
- March 2 – (United States) Huff Daland Dusters – started as an aerial crop-dusting company, was not a mail or cargo carrier, but it grew into Delta Air Lines, currently one of the world's largest airlines, carrying passengers, mail and cargo.
- April 19 – (United States) Ryan Airline Company – founded in San Diego and ran one of southern California's earliest scheduled services (Los Angeles–San Diego). Ryan built and operated mail and small passenger services (Ryan M-1 and other types) and operated early scheduled feeder routes that supported mail/cargo networks.
- May 21 – (United States) National Air Transport – founded for the purpose of carrying parcels and to compete for Contract Airmail (CAM) routes, was awarded several CAM routes and became a major U.S. airmail carrier. It is bought by Boeing in 1930 to later become United Airlines.
- July 13 – (United States) Western Air Express (later Western Airlines) – formed to bid for and operate Contract Airmail Routes (CAMs).
- September 15 – (Bolivia) Lloyd Aéreo Boliviano (LAB) – commenced service Sep 23–24, 1925 and was Bolivia's flag carrier from 1925 until 2010. LAB operated domestic and later international passenger and freight services. In early decades it carried significant volumes of mail and cargo in a country where air links were crucial for connecting remote regions.

=== 1926 ===
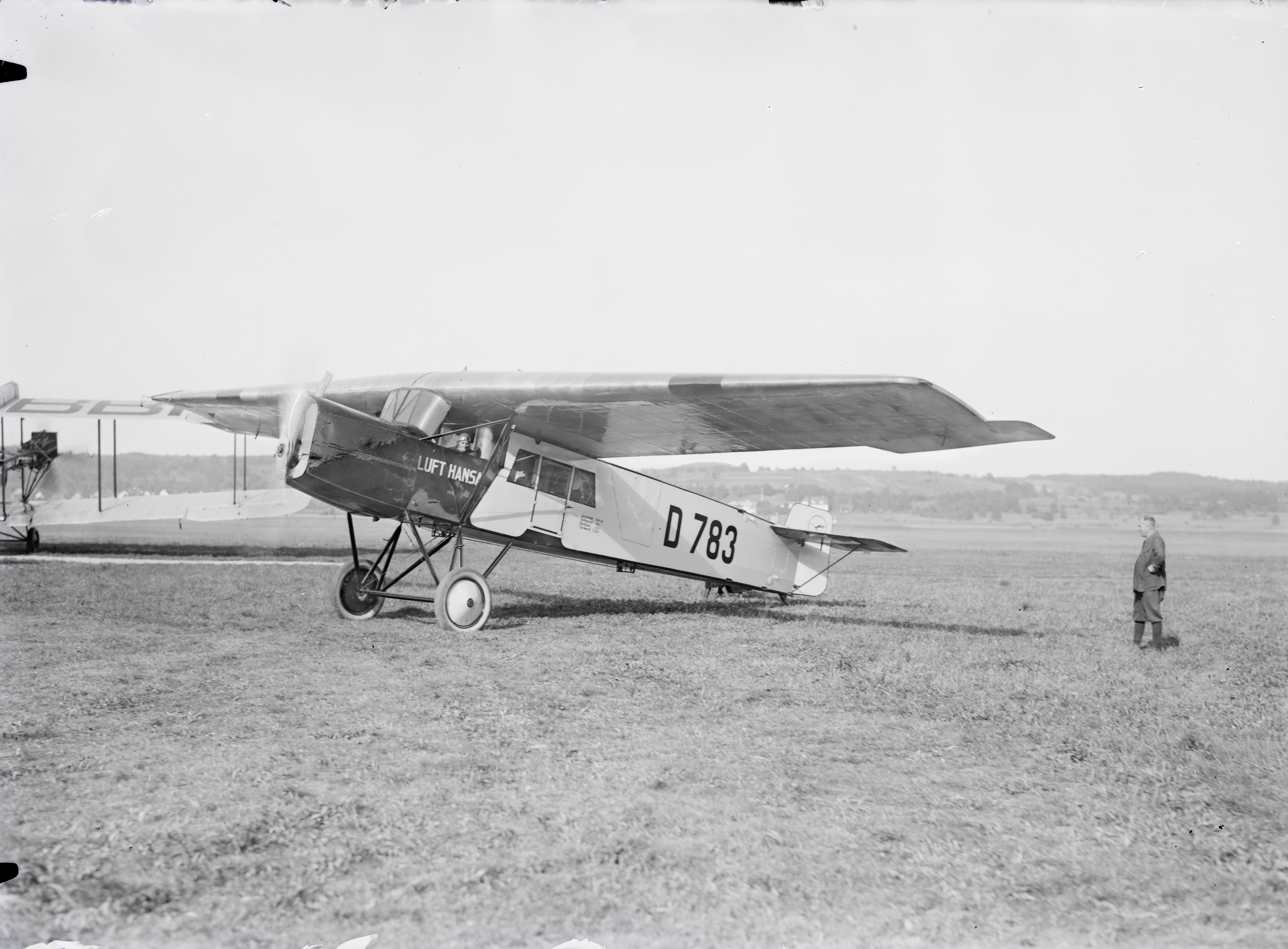
Fokker F.II D-783 Luft Hansa Dübendorf – between 1926 and 1930

- January 6 – (Germany) Deutsche Luft Hansa – Germany's flag carrier; began operations in April.
- October 14 – (United States) The Materiel Division of the U.S. Army Air Corps was set up by combining the former Air Service's Airplane Engineering Division and Fairfield Aviation General Supply Depot under the newly established Army Air Corps. It undertook USAAC's aviation research & development, flight testing, procurement, supply and maintenance activities.
- July – (United States) Thompson Aeronautical Corporation (TAC) – organized in July 1926 and won early Contract Air Mail routes from the U.S. Post Office. In 1931, the airline-operating side of Thompson Aeronautical became a subsidiary of the parent company operating as Transamerican Airlines Corporation (TAC)
- October 1 – (United States) Northwest Airways – founded as a contract mail carrier.

=== 1927 ===
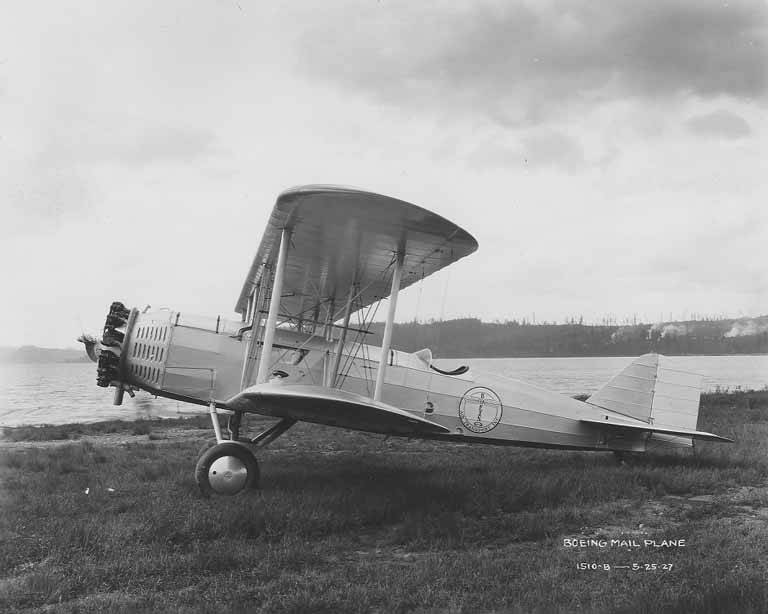
Boeing Air Transport Inc 40-A Mail/Passenger biplane, May 25, 1927

- January 15 – (United States) Boeing Air Transport – formed to carry airmail between Chicago and San Francisco. It eventually will become United Airlines.
- March 14 – (United States) Pan American Airways – formed to carry airmail on the Key West-Havana route.
- September 15 – (Argentina) Aeroposta Argentina S.A. – an Argentine airline established as a subsidiary of the French airmail carrier Aéropostale (Compagnie générale aéropostale). In 1929, Aéropostale expanded its airmail network within South America, including the first domestic air services on routes to Asunción, Paraguay, Santiago de Chile, and the Argentine cities of Bahía Blanca, Comodoro Rivadavia and Río Gallegos. The task of opening the new air routes was assigned, among others, to the French aviators Antoine de Saint-Exupéry and Jean Mermoz. Saint-Exupéry served as director of the newly formed company based in Buenos Aires, while Mermoz was appointed chief pilot. Saint-Exupéry conducted Aeroposta's inaugural flight on November 1, 1929, from the airfield at Villa Harding Green to Comodoro Rivadavia.

=== 1928 ===
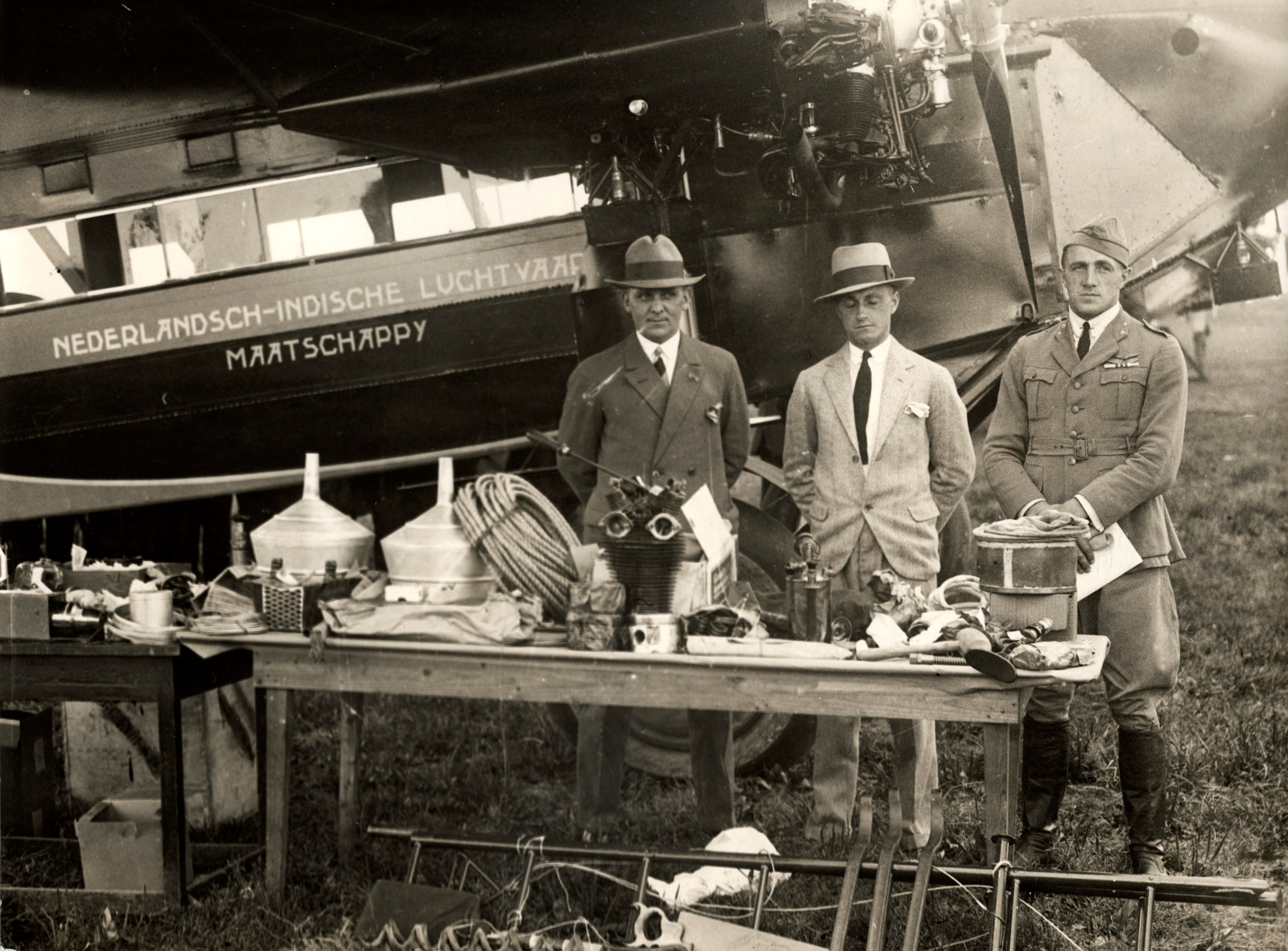
Cargo of a Dutch East Indies NILM Fokker airliner heading / headed for Jakarta, Indonesia (a Dutch colony at that time). The pilots (from left to right): J.J. Mol, S. Elleman, M. van Hazelen). Schiphol airport Amsterdam, the Netherlands, 1928.

- May 1 – (United States) Pitcairn Aviation – began operations along the Atlantic seaboard as a contract mail-hauler.
- July 16 – (Dutch East Indies) KNILM – Koninklijke Nederlandsch-Indische Luchtvaart Maatschappij (in English: Royal Dutch Indies Airways) – the flag carrier of the former Dutch East Indies, originally founded as NILM. Headquartered in Amsterdam, KNILM was not a subsidiary of the better-known KLM (Royal Dutch Airlines), despite the similar name. The airline had its headquarters in Amsterdam and an office in on the grounds of Tjililitan Airfield (current Halim Perdanakusuma International Airport) in Batavia (current Jakarta). KNILM did not fly to the Netherlands, as the Amsterdam-Batavia weekly service was operated by KLM. Its operations facilitated the transport of airmail, freight, and people across the Dutch East Indies and to other parts of Southeast Asia.
- October 30 – (Japan) Japan Air Transport Corporation (JAT) – established by the Japanese government as the national flag carrier under the Ministry of Communications. JAT absorbed the Japan Air Transport Institute and two other small companies and began scheduled airmail and air cargo services in 1929.
- December 29 – (Poland) LOT Polish Airlines – formed from a merger and commenced scheduled operations January 1, 1929; airmail was carried from the beginning of the company's existence.

=== 1929 ===
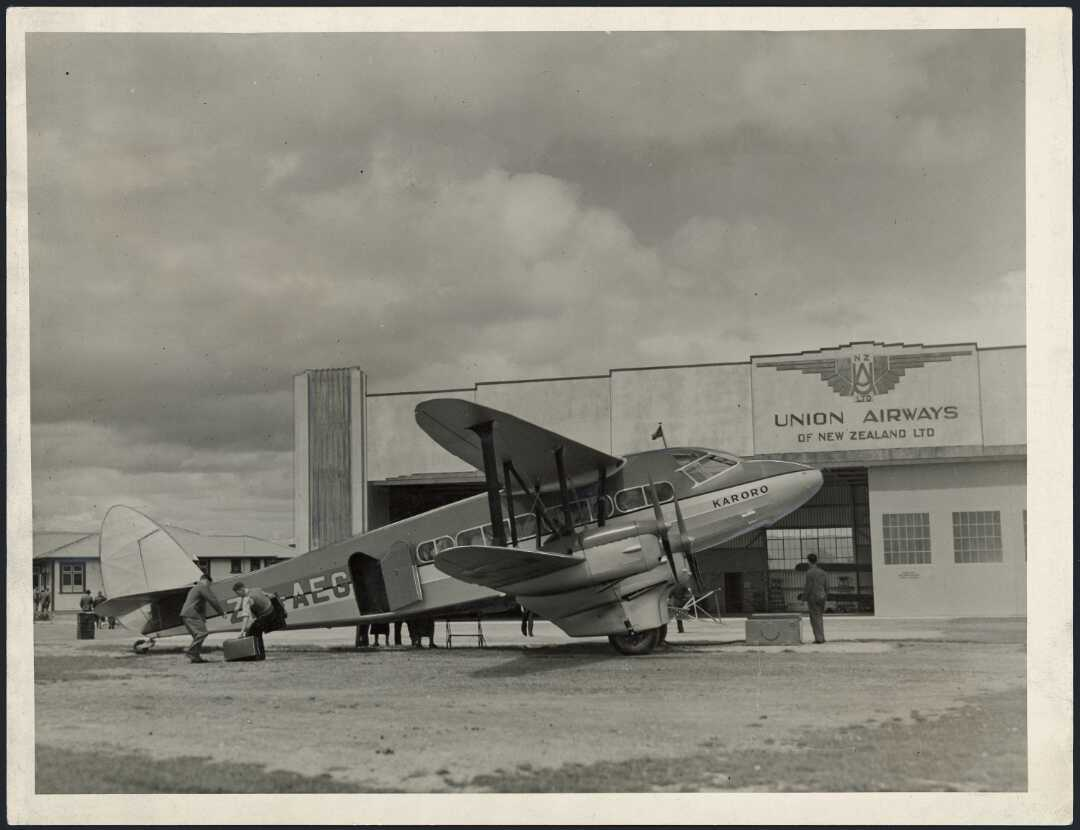
Union Airways airliner ZK-AEG Karoro at Milson aerodrome, Palmerston North about November 4, 1936

- January 30 – (United States) Inter-Island Airways — first service with Sikorsky Aircraft flying boats began in October/November 1929 and the airline later took on authorized inter-island airmail routes.
- March – (United States) Railway Express Agency (REA) – an early American air freight agent. In March 1929, the assets and operations of American Railway Express Inc. (founded 1918) were transferred to Railway Express Agency (REA). REA was owned by 86 railroads in proportion to the express traffic on their lines; no one railroad or group of railroads controlled the agency. In response to customer demand, REA added a Chicago-based refrigerator car line. In 1927, REA began an Air Express Division.
- March 5 – (Chile) Línea Aérea Nacional (LAN) – Chile's government-sponsored postal/airline (often styled as Línea Aeropostal Santiago–Arica) was established to provide domestic air service and postal carriage.
- July 24 – (South Africa) Union Airways – a national/regionally focused carrier whose early role included airmail.

== First flights ==
This decade, the following aircraft that were or would become important for air cargo and airmail history had their first flight:

=== 1921 ===
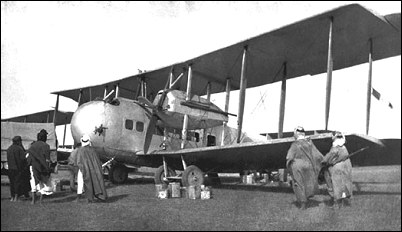
Vickers Vernon on ground, c1921

- Undated – (United Kingdom) Vickers Vernon – a British biplane troop carrier used by the Royal Air Force. It entered service in 1921 and was the first dedicated troop transport of the RAF. The Vernon was a development of the Vickers Vimy Commercial, a passenger variant of the famous Vickers Vimy bomber. 55 were built.

=== 1922 ===
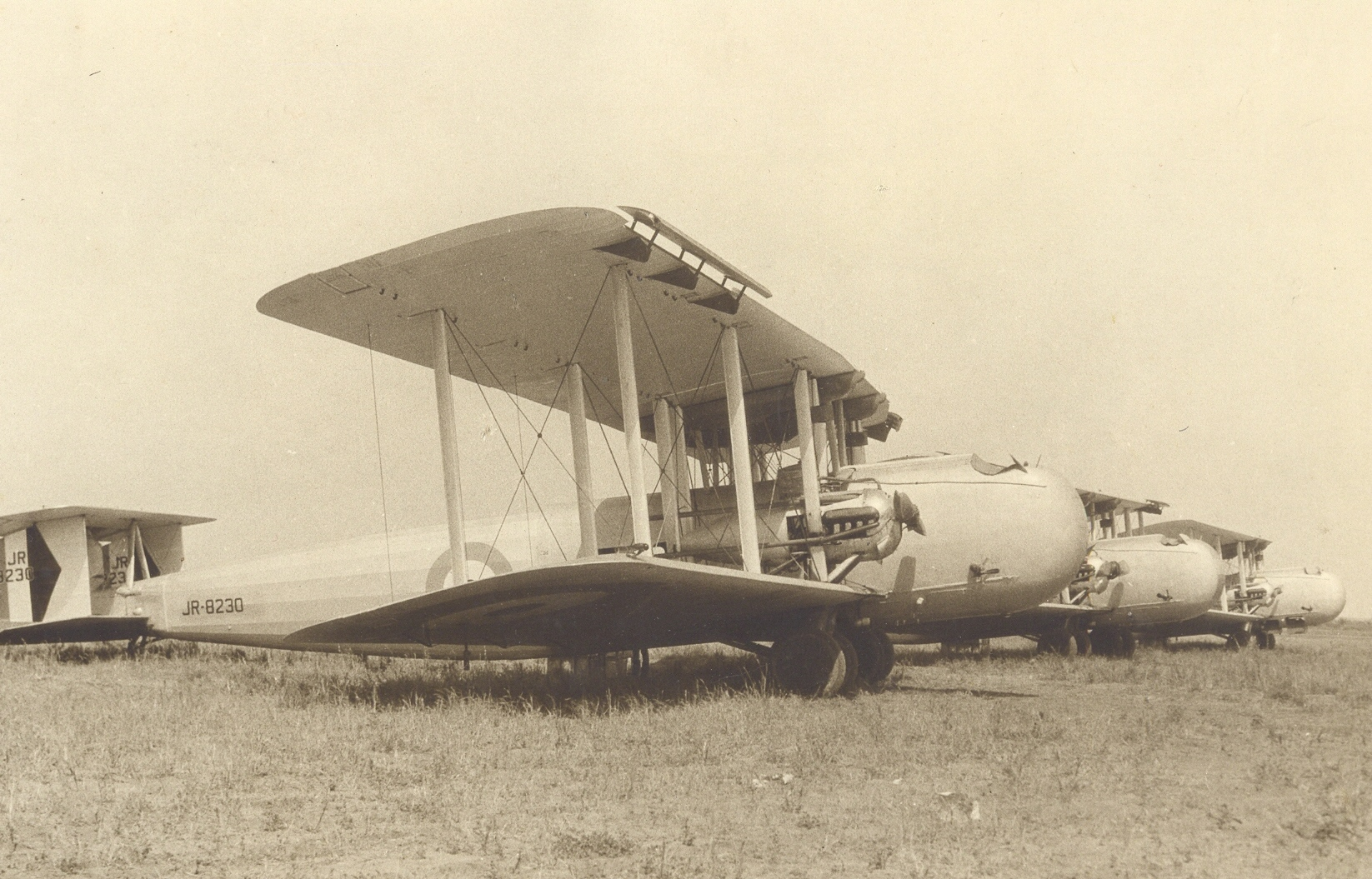
216 Squadron RAF Vickers Victorias at Ismailia, Egypt, c1929 (A A Koch)

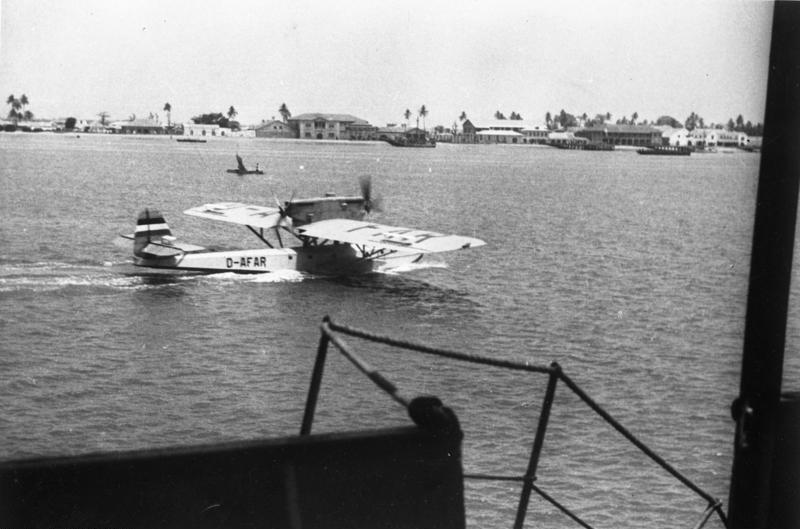
A Luft Hansa Dornier Do J II f Bos, registered D-AFAR and named Samum in Bathurst (1938)

- March 26 – (United Kingdom) De Havilland DH.34 – a single engined British biplane airliner built by the de Havilland Aircraft Company in the 1920s. 12 were built, with the DH.34 serving with Imperial Airways and its predecessors for several years. The DH.34s were used heavily on the cross channel air services.
- August 22 – (United Kingdom) Vickers Type 56 Victoria – a British biplane freighter and troop transport aircraft used by the Royal Air Force. The Victoria flew for the first time in 1922 and was selected for production over the Armstrong Whitworth Awana. Eight Victorias of 70 Squadron played an important part in the Kabul Airlift of November 1928 – February 1929, when in severe winter conditions, RAF aircraft evacuated diplomatic staff and their dependents together with members of the Afghan royal family endangered by a civil war. The aircraft also helped to pioneer air routes for Imperial Airways.
- November 6 – (Germany) Dornier Do J Wal ("whale") designated Do 16 - a twin-engine German flying boat of the 1920s designed by Dornier Flugzeugwerke. Numerous airlines operated Wals on scheduled passenger and mail services with great success. The biggest and last versions of the Wal, the eight and ten tonne variants (both versions also known as Katapultwal), were operated by Lufthansa on their South Atlantic airmail service from Stuttgart, Germany to Natal, Brazil.

=== 1923 ===
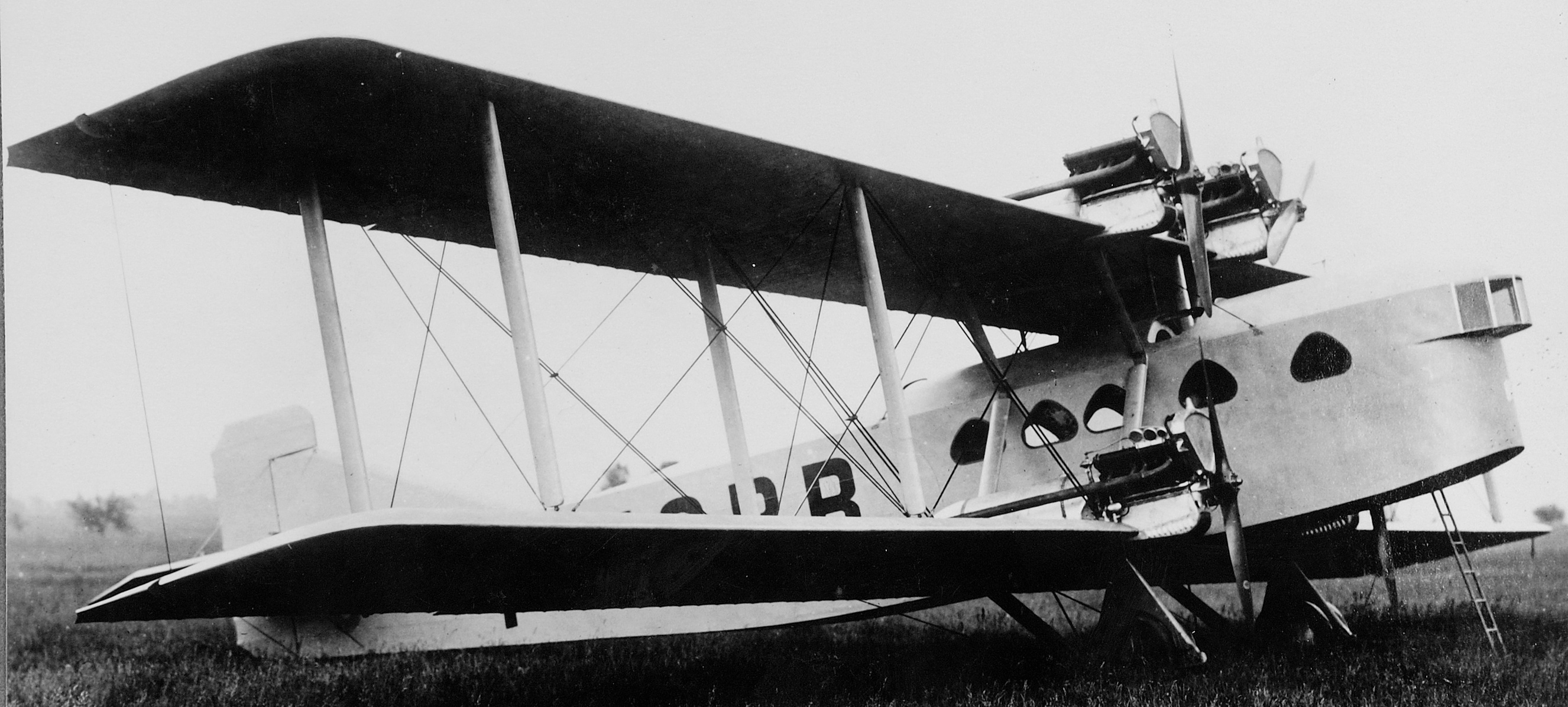
Blériot Bl-115 prototype F-ESBB. (This aircraft crashed on June 23, 1923; in 1924 it was rebuilt with radial engines as the Bl-135.)

- May 9 – (France) Blériot 115 – a French biplane airliner of the 1920s, best remembered for the part it played in the French exploration of air routes in Africa.

=== 1924 ===
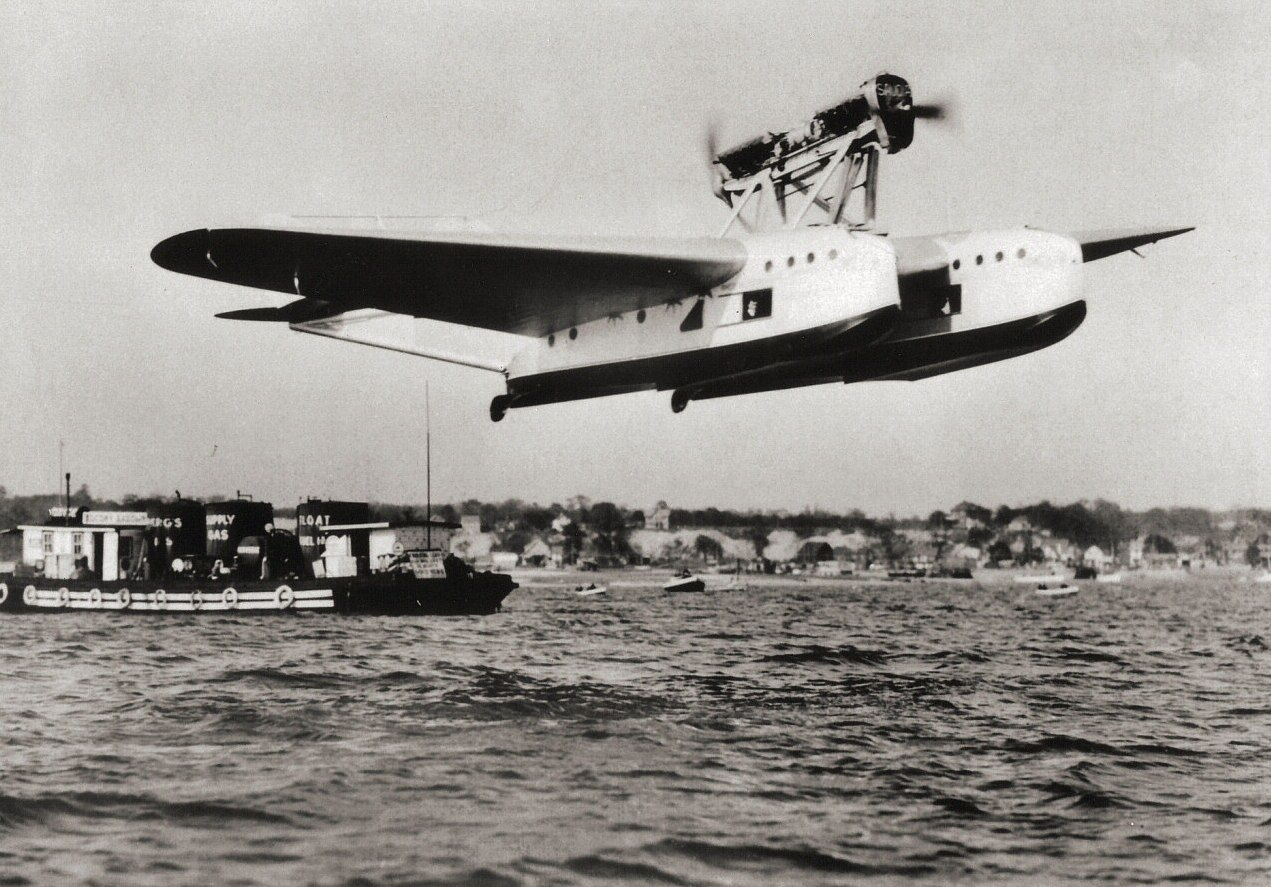
Savoia Marchetti S.55 Taking Off From Manhasset Bay in 1929.

- Undated – (United States) Douglas M-2 – a purpose-built mail plane for early US contract airmail.
- Undated – (Netherlands) Fokker F.VII (A/B, 1m/3m variants) – became a popular single-engine as well as trimotor type for early airlines and airmail routes, as well as for early military transport (C/TA/RA variants).
- Undated – (United States) Swallow New Swallow and Swallow J4 Mailplane – an American-built general purpose biplane, also used to carry mail. The J4 Mailplane was a variant built to carry mail for Varney Air Lines in 1926. The aircraft type was redesigned in 1926 with a steel frame as Super Swallow.
- December 7 – (Italy) Savoia-Marchetti S.55 – a twin-hull flying boat used for long-range mail/record flights.

=== 1925 ===
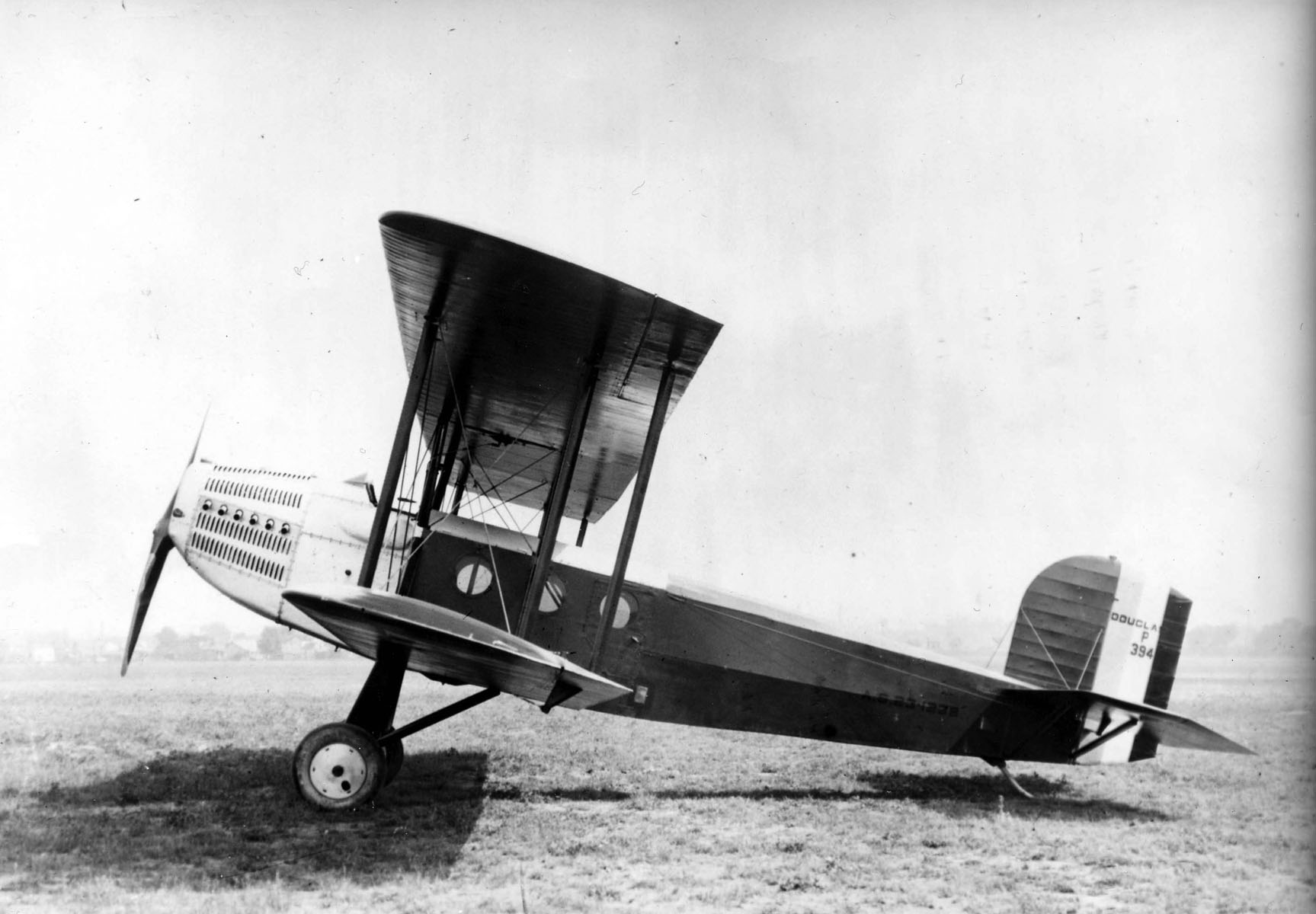
Douglas C-1 side view. (U.S. Air Force photo)

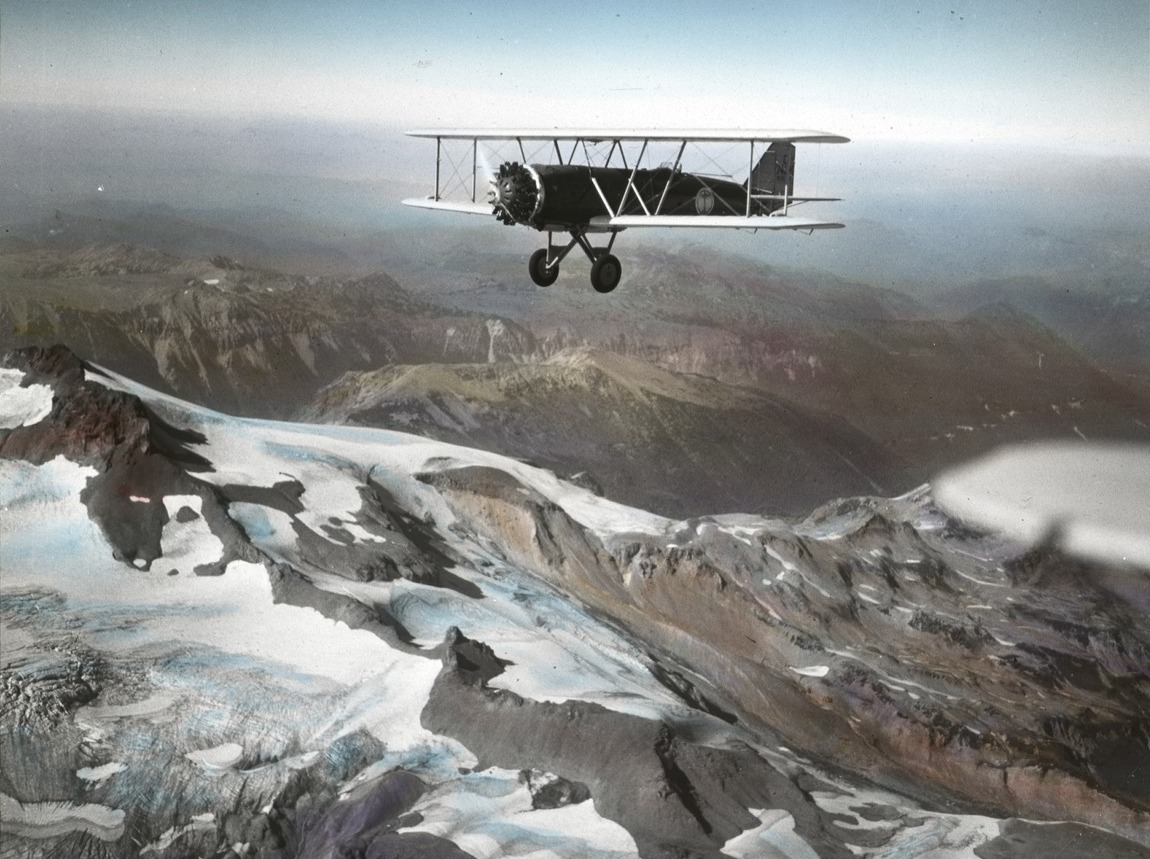
Boeing Model 40 over mountains circa 1930s

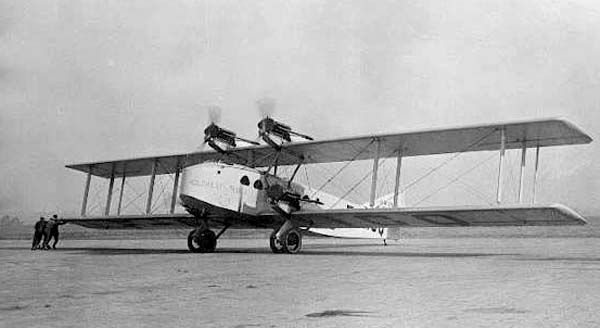
Blériot 155 airliner F-AICQ Clement Ader. This aircraft was in service from May – October 1926. It crashed on October 2, 1926, as the result of the first in-flight fire on a civil airliner with the loss of 7 lives.

- Undated – (United States) Aerial Service Mercury Senior – a small specialized U.S. mail plane design.
- Undated – (United States) Curtiss Carrier Pigeon – an American single-engined biplane mail plane designed and built to replace World War I surplus aircraft such as the DH-4, the Carrier Pigeon was one of the first aircraft designed specifically for U.S. Airmail service.
- Undated – (United States) Douglas mailplanes (M-1/M-2/M-3/M-4) – a family of 1920s American single-seat mail planes designed and built by the Douglas Aircraft Company. The aircraft were used to run the main routes of the United States Air Mail service until the introduction of three-engined aircraft in 1928.
- Undated – (United States) Waco 9 – an American-built three-seat biplane design, also used to carry airmail.
- January 3 – (United Kingdom) Fairey Fox – a British light bomber and fighter biplane of the 1920s and 1930s, originally produced in Britain for the RAF, but continued in production and use in Belgium long after it was retired in Britain. One aircraft saw some use carrying freight in Papua New Guinea with the Pacific Aerial Transport Company (PAT) for a short time in 1936.
- March 13 – (United States) Travel Air 2000 – an open-cockpit biplane aircraft produced in the United States in the late 1920s by the Travel Air Manufacturing Company. Like many aircraft of the period, they also operated as air taxis and provided air charter services, carrying passengers and light air cargo, and some would find their way north where they worked as bushplanes.
- May 2 – (United States) Douglas C-1 - a cargo/transport aircraft produced by the Douglas Aircraft Corporation for the United States Army Air Service starting in 1925. The C-1 was the first aircraft assigned in the new C- category and was the first purpose-built cargo/transport aircraft. It featured an enclosed passenger compartment capable of carrying six passengers or about 2,500 lb (1,100 kg) of cargo. A trap door was placed in the lower fuselage to allow large and/or heavy cargo (particularly aircraft engines) to be lifted directly into the cargo compartment. An auxiliary door for passengers and light cargo was included on the right side of the center fuselage.
- July 7 – (United States) Boeing Model 40 – a purpose-designed U.S. Post Office mail plane; later followed by a passenger/mail 40A variant.
- July 29 – (France) Blériot 155 (or Bl-155) – a French airliner of the 1920s. It was a four-engined biplane developed from the Blériot 115 and 135, but larger than these aircraft. Two were built for use by Air Union on their Paris-London route. Both were lost in accidents in 1926.

=== 1926 ===
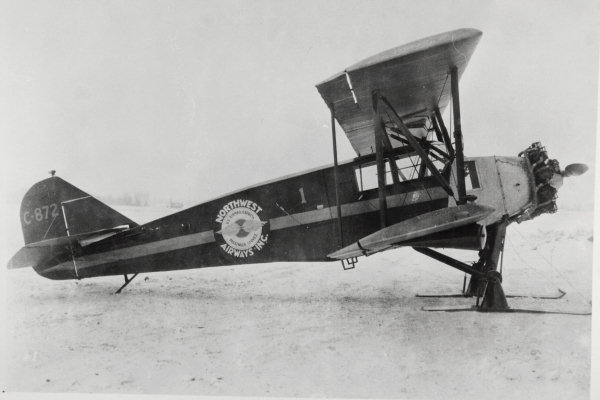
Stinson SB-1 Detroiter NC872 with Northwest Airways Inc

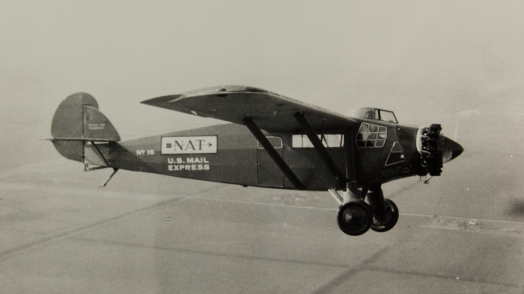
Travel Air 5000 with National Air Transport in flight

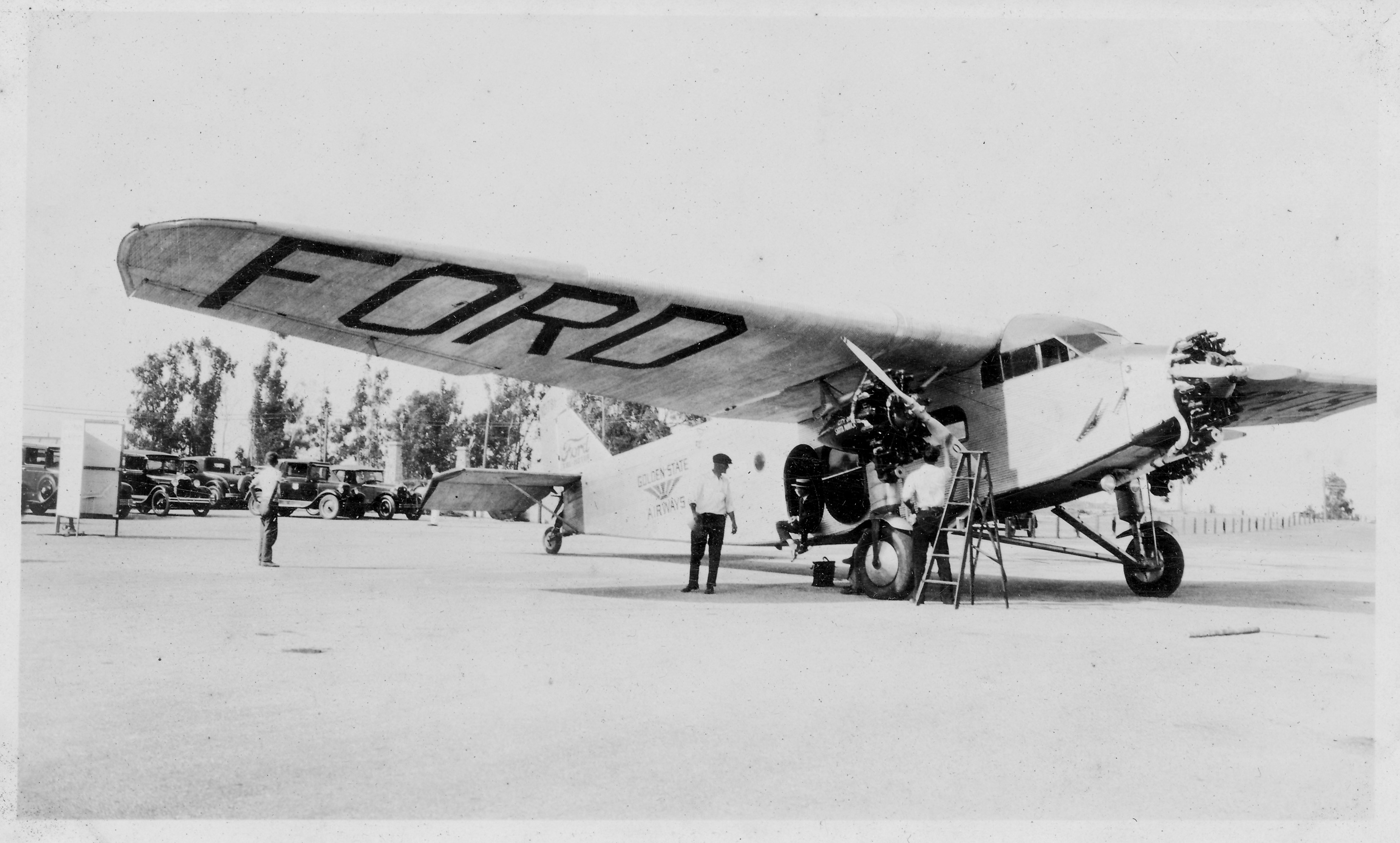
Queensland Railways Study Tour of American rail systems, 1929–30

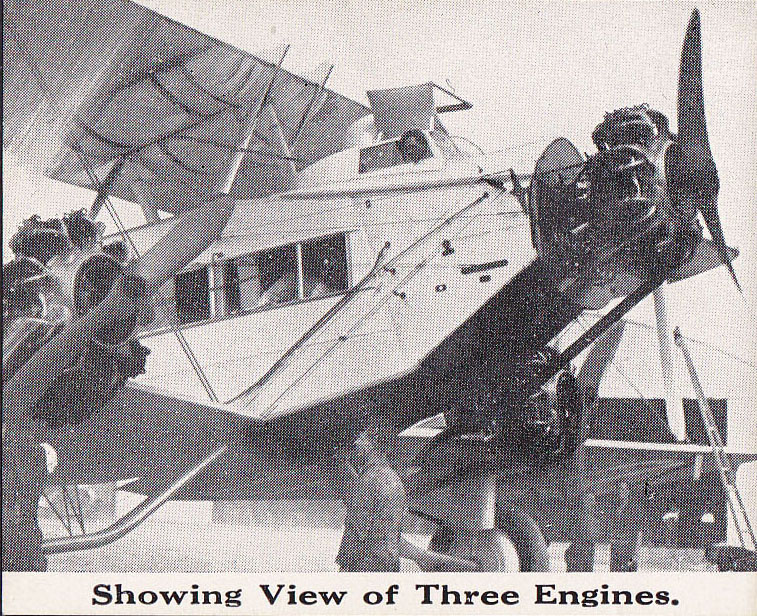
West Australian Airways DH.66

- Undated – (United States) Vought O2U Corsair – a 1920s biplane scout and observation aircraft. Developed by Vought Corporation, the O2U was ordered by the United States Navy (USN) in 1927. Powered by a 400 hp (298 kW) Pratt & Whitney R-1340 engine, it incorporated a steel-tube fuselage structure and a wood wing structure with fabric covering. Many were seaplanes or amphibians. In Germany the commercial variant (V-85G) used to deliver mail from the ocean liners SS Bremen and SS Europa.
- January 25 – (United States) Stinson Detroiter SB/SM variants – a six-seat cabin airliner for passengers or mail/freight, designed and built by the Stinson Aircraft Syndicate, later the Stinson Aircraft Corporation. Two distinct designs used the Detroiter name, a biplane and a monoplane.
- February 14 – (United States) Ryan M-1 / M-2 – a mail plane by Ryan Aeronautical. A front cockpit could accommodate two passengers side by side, or one passenger and a sack of mail, or just mail sacks and no passenger.
- March – (United States) Travel Air 5000 – an early high-wing monoplane airliner and racing monoplane designed by Clyde Cessna, mainly used by National Air Transport for their mail routes (CAM3).
- June 11 – (United States) Ford Trimotor – an American three-engined transport aircraft; its rugged, all-metal construction and multi-engine reliability made it a workhorse for early passenger, mail and freight services worldwide; widely used in the airline industry. Mail was carried in the fuselage after the passenger seats were removed to create a cargo area. Some versions of the 5-AT model also had special "drop-down" cargo holds located under the lower inner wing sections to increase capacity.
- September 30 – (United Kingdom) De Havilland DH.66 Hercules – a British 1920s seven-passenger, trimotor airliner built by de Havilland Aircraft Company. With the Hercules, Imperial Airways took over responsibility for the airmail service from the Royal Air Force, which had been operating the obsolete Airco DH.10 Amiens. The Hercules effectively provided long-distance service to far-flung regions for Imperial Airways. Although slow, they pointed the way for future airliners.

=== 1927 ===
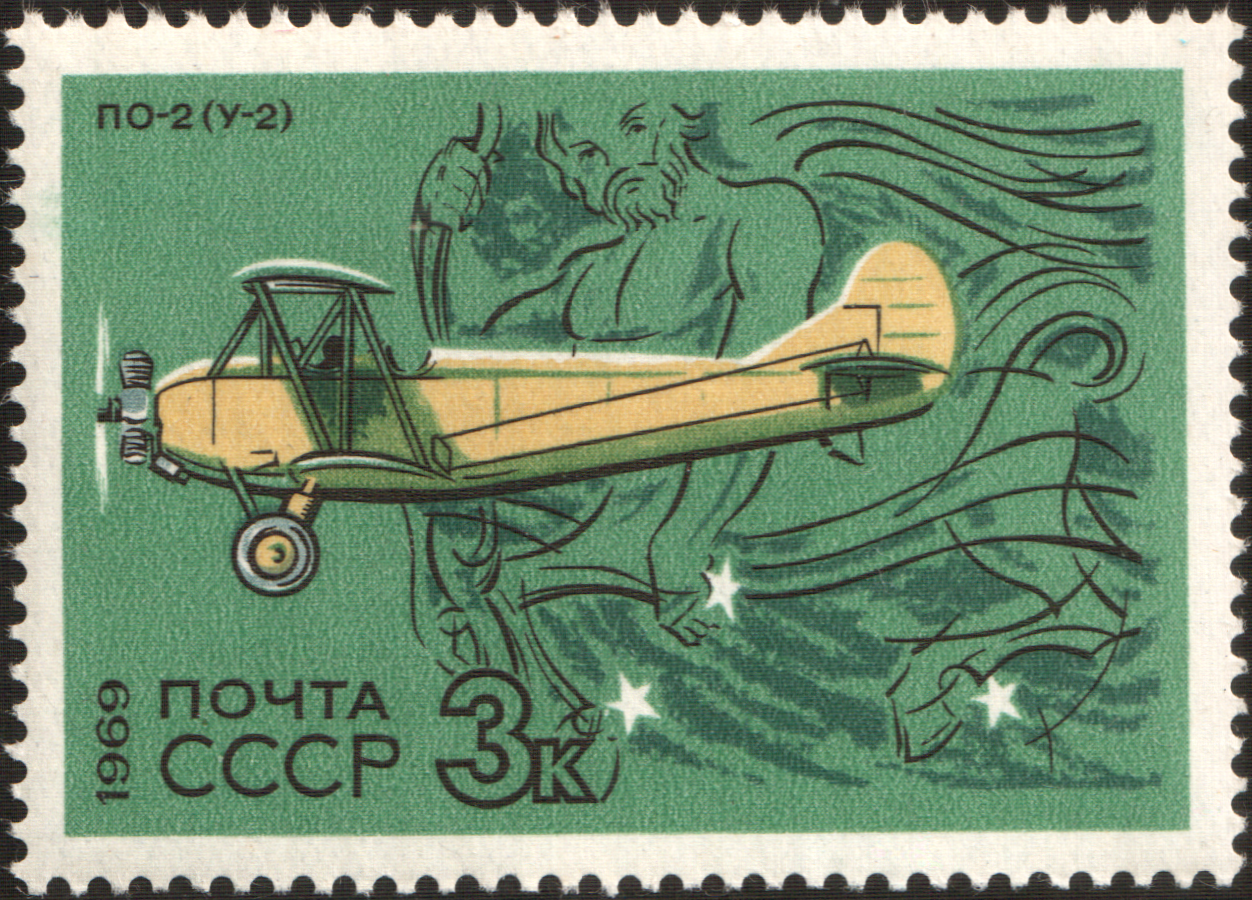
The Soviet Union 1969 CPA 3828 stamp (Airplane Polikarpov Po-2 (U-2), 1927. Centaur)

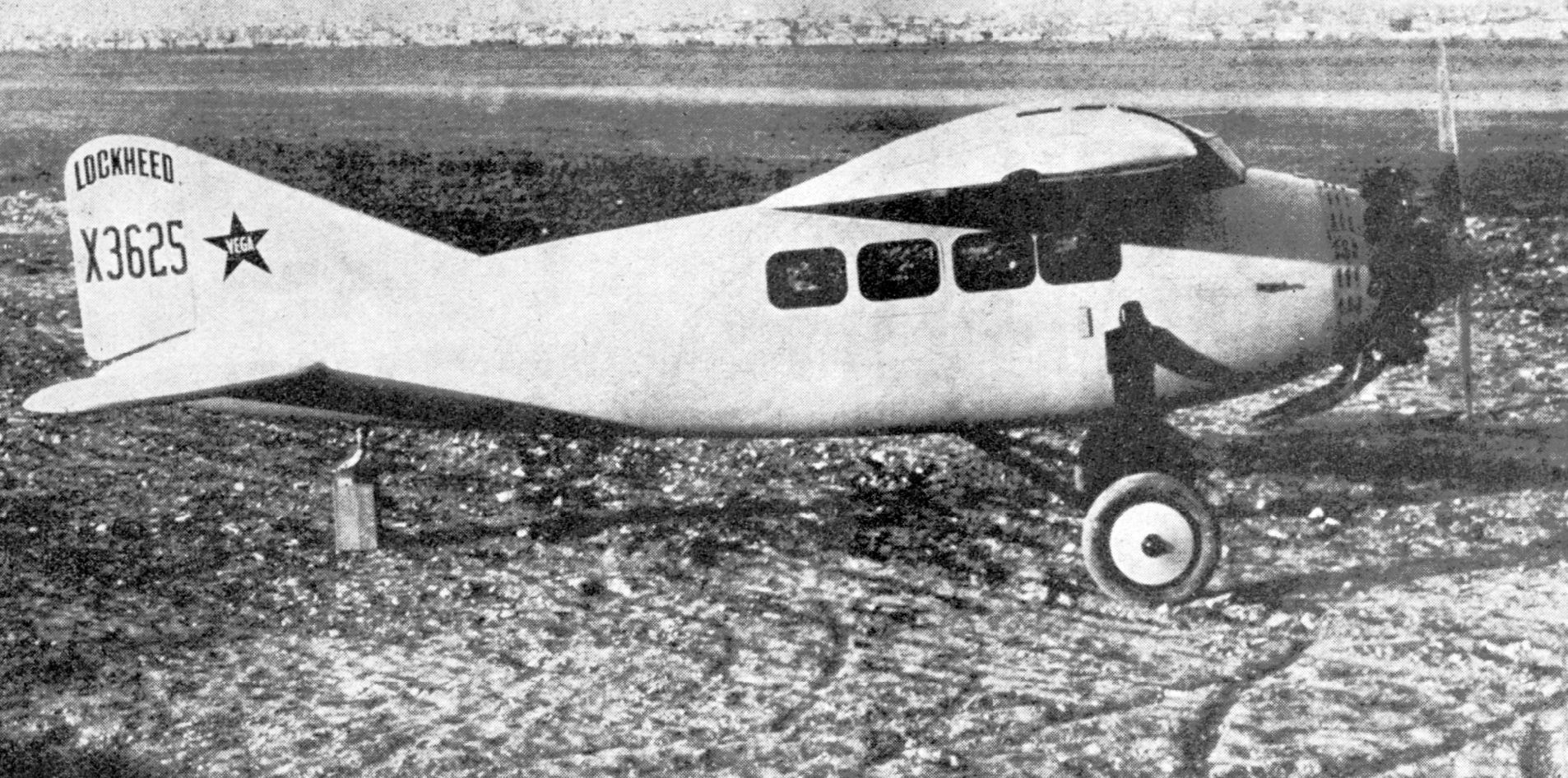
Lockheed Vega 1 L'Air December 15, 1928

- Undated – (United States) Elias AJE Air Express – a prototype of a small mail plane.
- Undated – (United States) Keystone Pronto – a mail plane design.
- Undated – (United States) Pitcairn PA-5 Mailwing – designed specifically as a mail plane for US mail.
- Undated – (United States) Stearman C3 – an American-built civil biplane aircraft of the 1920s, designed by Stearman Aircraft of Wichita, Kansas. The C3MB was a special mail-carrying aircraft based on the C3 with the forward cockpit enclosed as a dedicated cargo compartment. This version was operated in 1928 by National Parks Airways on airmail route CAM 26 from Salt Lake City, Utah to Pocatello, Idaho and Great Falls, Montana.
- Undated – (United States) Travel Air 4000 - an American general-purpose biplane used for both mail and cargo, as well as for passenger flights, training, and aerobatics. Specialized versions were built or converted to serve as dedicated mailplanes, featuring a mail compartment in place of the front cockpit. Other variants were also used by bush pilots to haul freight to remote areas.
- April 29 – (France) Latécoère 28 – the principal long-range airmail aircraft for Aéropostale.
- June 24 – (Soviet Union) Polikarpov Po-2 – originally designed as a trainer and utility aircraft, it served a variety of civil and military roles, including the transport of mail, supplies, and personnel, particularly in areas with limited infrastructure. Its ability to take off and land on short, rough, or improvised airstrips made it ideal for operating in remote locations, where larger, more modern aircraft could not easily reach. After World War II, the Po-2 continued in service for many years with various national air forces and civilian operations, with specific mentions of its use for mail delivery in Poland and for general "light transport" with Aeroflot in the Soviet Union.
- July 4 – (United States) Lockheed Vega – an American five- to seven-seat high-wing monoplane airliner built by the Lockheed Corporation starting in 1927. It became famous for its use by a number of record-breaking pilots who were attracted to its high speed and long range. Amelia Earhart became the first woman to fly solo across the Atlantic Ocean in one, and Wiley Post used his to prove the existence of the jet stream after flying around the world twice.

=== 1928 ===
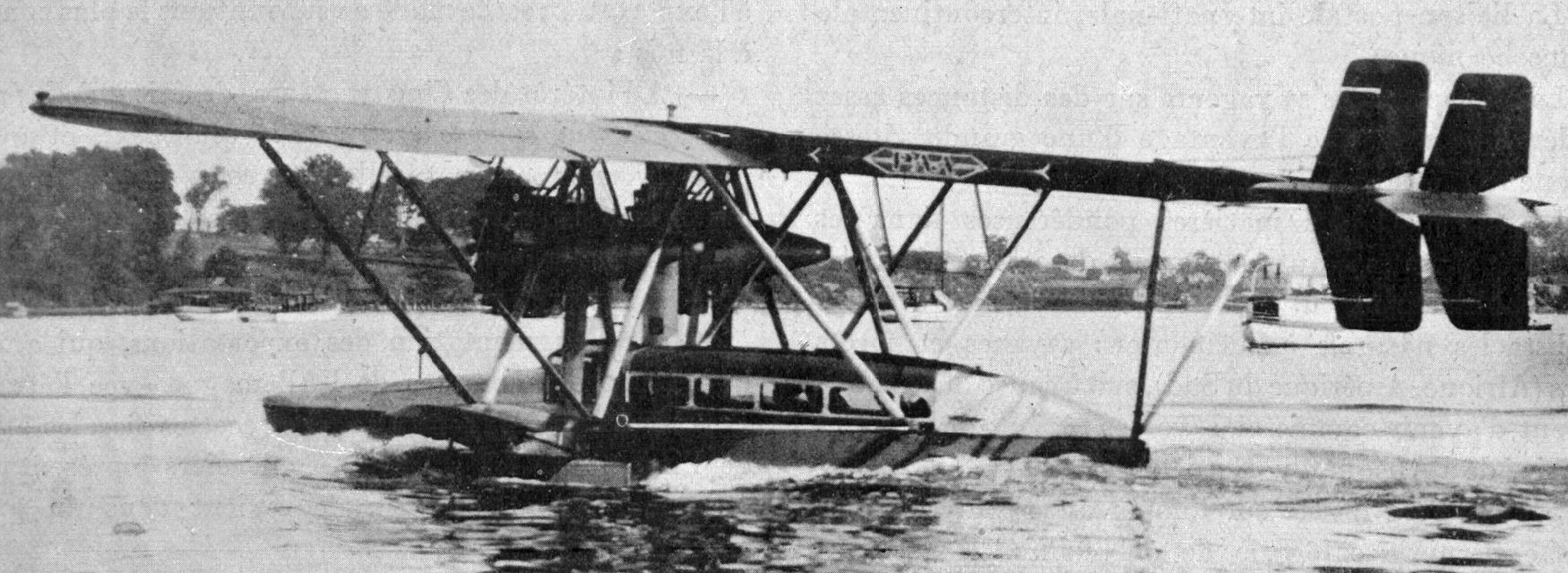
Sikorsky S-38 Pan American Airways L'Aéronautique March,1929

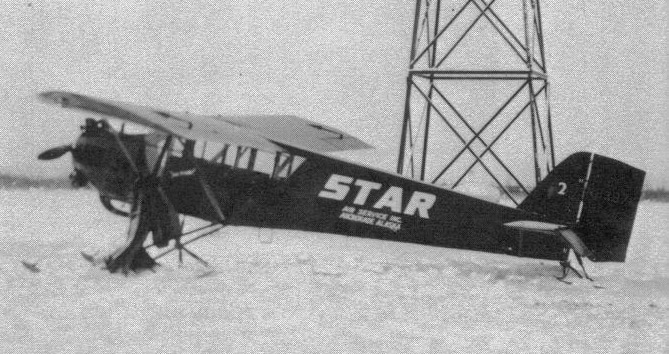
Star Air Service Curtiss Robin A

- Undated – (United States) Hamilton H-45 and H-47 – six-passenger-seat, all-metal, high-wing monoplanes powered by single Pratt & Whitney radial engines, built for passenger and mail-carrying work in the US in the late 1920s.
- Undated – (United States) Loening C-2 Air Yacht – an amphibious airliner, operated in scheduled revenue service and as a mail freighter/air-ferry in the late 1920s–1930s.
- Undated – (United States) Loening C-4C, later the Keystone-Loening K-85 Air Yacht – an amphibious utility biplane built in the United States in the late 1920s, following the merger of the Loening and Keystone companies. It was operated on scheduled regional routes carrying passengers and mail/freight.
- Undated – (United States) Pitcairn PA-6 Super Mailwing – designed specifically as a mail plane for US mail.
- Undated – (United Kingdom) Short S.8 Calcutta – a flying-boat used on Imperial mail routes.
- April 15 – (United States) Travel Air 6000 (later known as the Curtiss-Wright 6B when Travel Air was purchased by Curtiss-Wright) – a six-seat utility aircraft, a.o. operated in 1928 by National Air Transport on their US mail and passenger routes from Chicago to New York, Chicago to Dallas and Chicago to Kansas City.
- May 25 – (United States) Sikorsky S-38 - an American twin-engined ten-seat sesquiplane amphibious aircraft. It was Sikorsky's first widely produced amphibious flying boat, serving successfully for Pan American Airways and the United States military. It was important to early Pan Am's transoceanic mail experiments and island feeder routes, but was also in use with e.g. KNILM, Inter-Island Airways and Hawaiian Airlines.
- August 7 – (United States) Curtiss Robin – introduced in 1928, is an American high-wing monoplane built by the Curtiss-Robertson Airplane Manufacturing Company. The aircraft was used for U.S. ontract air mail routes, rural newspaper delivery (dropping bundles), and general mail transport in other countries. It carried light cargo, often alongside passengers or in place of rear seats and was used as a military transport.
- December 29 – (United States) Boeing Model 95 – a single-engine biplane built to supplement Model 40 mail operations.

=== 1929 ===
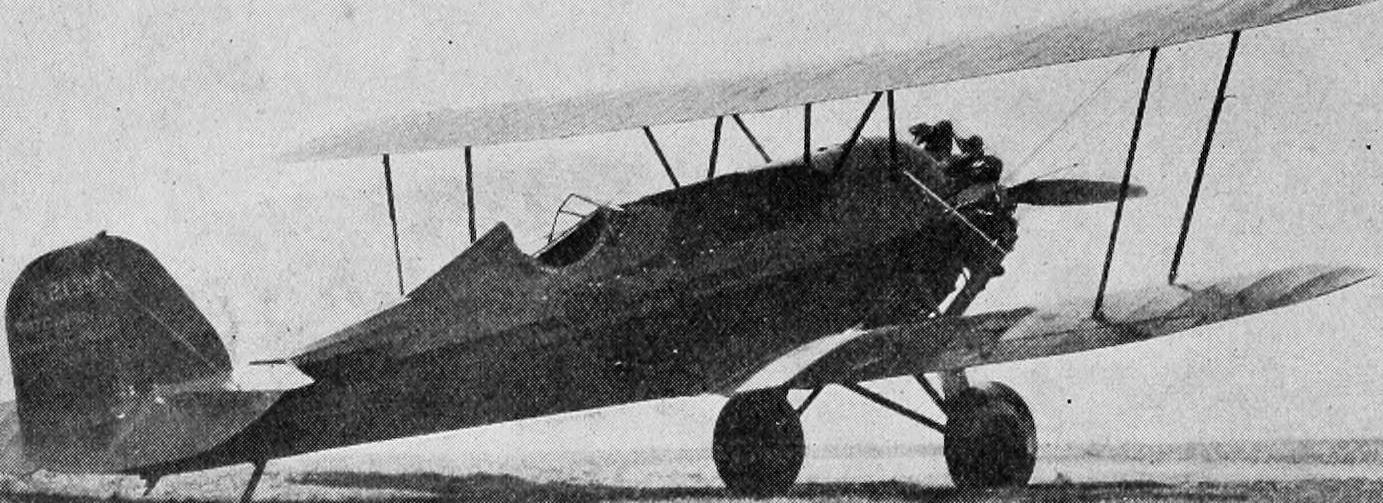
Pitcairn PA-7 Sport Mailwing Aero Digest April,1930

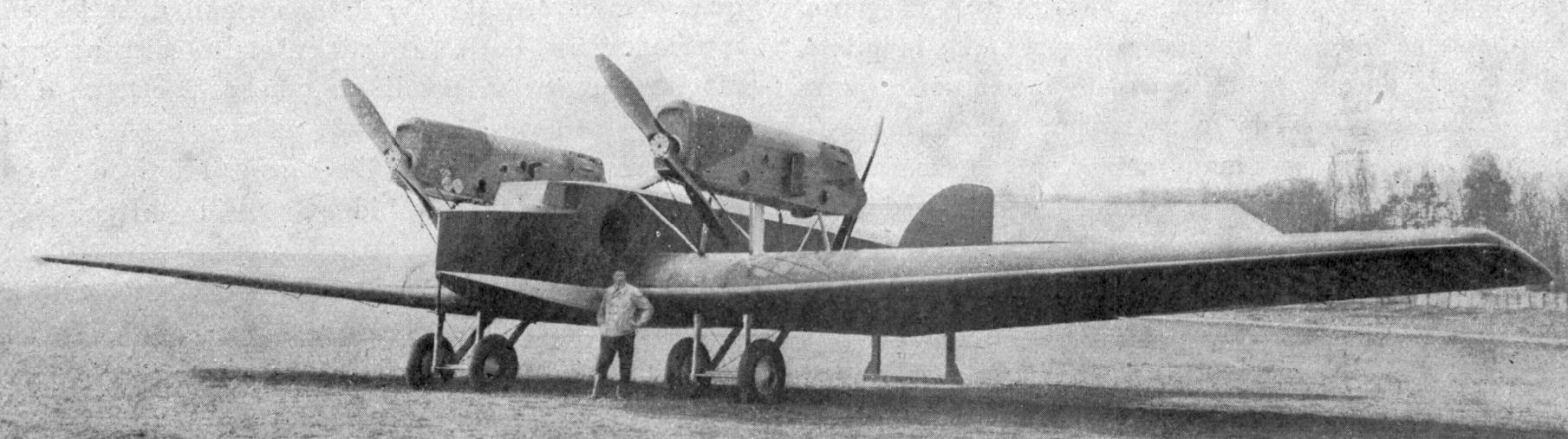
Blériot 195 left front L'Aéronautique April,1929

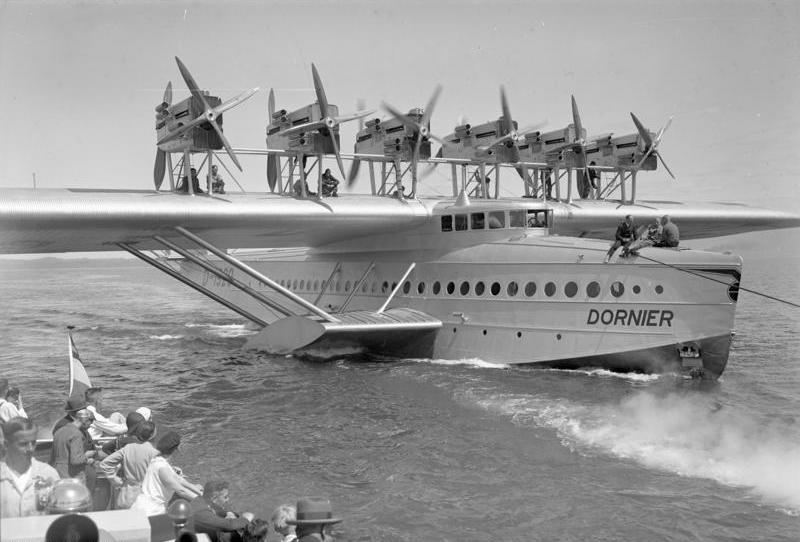
Flying Boat Dornier Do X

- Undated – (United States) Pitcairn PA-7 Mailwing – designed specifically as a mail plane for US mail.
- Undated – (United States) Waco JYM / JWM (mail variants) – small-series Waco variants marketed/used for mail carriage.
- January 15 – (United States) Stearman M-2 Speedmail (nicknamed the Bull Stearman) – a mail-carrier aircraft produced by the Stearman Aircraft Company of Wichita, Kansas. The Speedmail was a single-seat biplane, with two large cargo compartments in place of a front cockpit.
- March 9 – (France) Blériot 195 – a monoplane long-range mail plane design of which only one aircraft was built.
- July 12 – (Germany) Dornier Do X – the largest, heaviest, and most powerful flying boat in the world when it was produced by the Dornier company of Germany in 1929. First conceived by Claude Dornier in 1924, planning started in late 1925 and after over 240,000 work-hours it was completed in June 1929. Although mainly a passenger transport plane, the Do X and other Dornier flying boats were considered for mail/air postal duties on long stretches and experimental routes, but never used for the purpose.

== Context ==
The air cargo and airmail events of this decade took place within the following historical context:

- 1920s
- 1920s in aviation
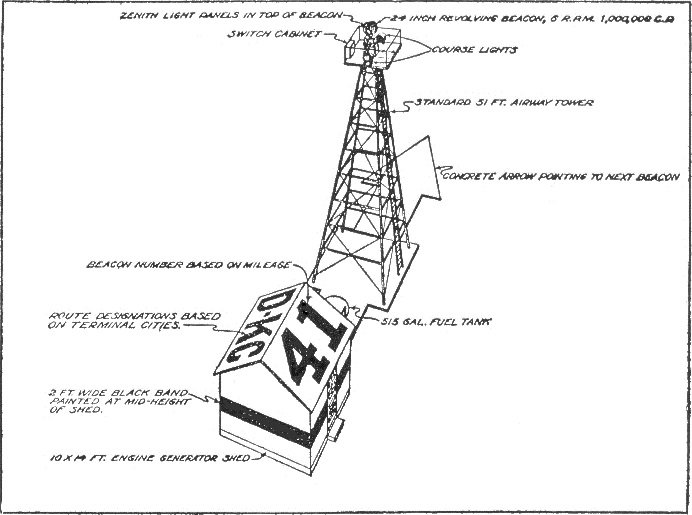
  - LightLaneTower
    (United Kingdom, Europe and the United States) Networks of airway beacons (or: aerial lighthouses) were established during the 1920s and 1930s, improving night/all-weather airmail operations and encouraging dependable mail/cargo schedules. Reliable ground aids were essential for scheduled airmail and commercial cargo services.
- 1920
- 1920 in aviation
- 1921
- 1921 in aviation
- 1922
- 1922 in aviation
- 1923
- 1923 in aviation
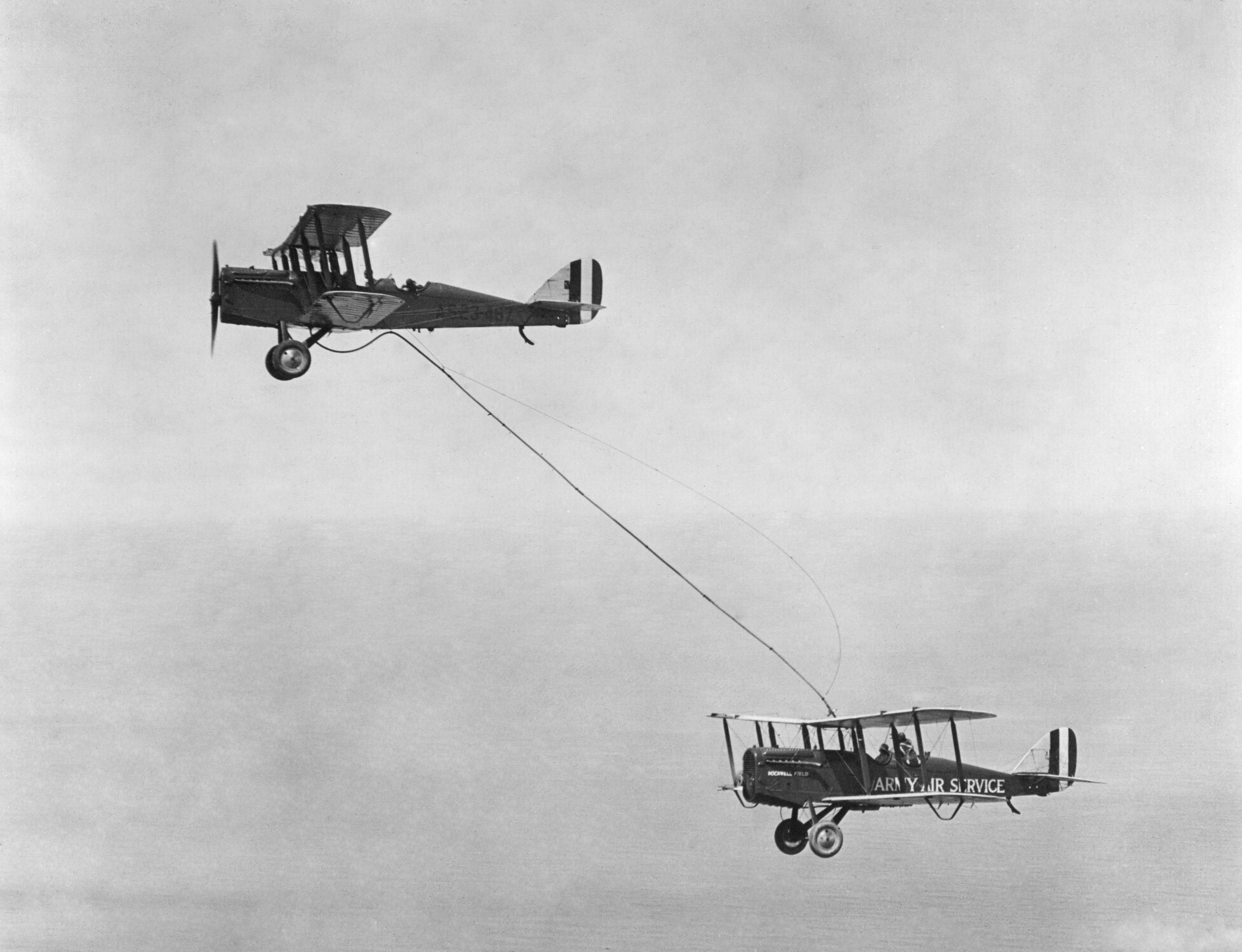
  - Refueling, 1923
    June – (United States) First demonstration of inflight refuelling (beginning June 1923) — The U.S. Army Air Service demonstrated fuel transfer between two Airco DH-4B planes (demonstration in late June; a record endurance refuelled flight followed in August). This proved the concept that would later enable extended-range transport and military air-supply missions.
- 1924
- 1924 in aviation
- 1925
- 1925 in aviation
- 1926
- 1926 in aviation
- 1927
- 1927 in aviation
- 1928
- 1928 in aviation
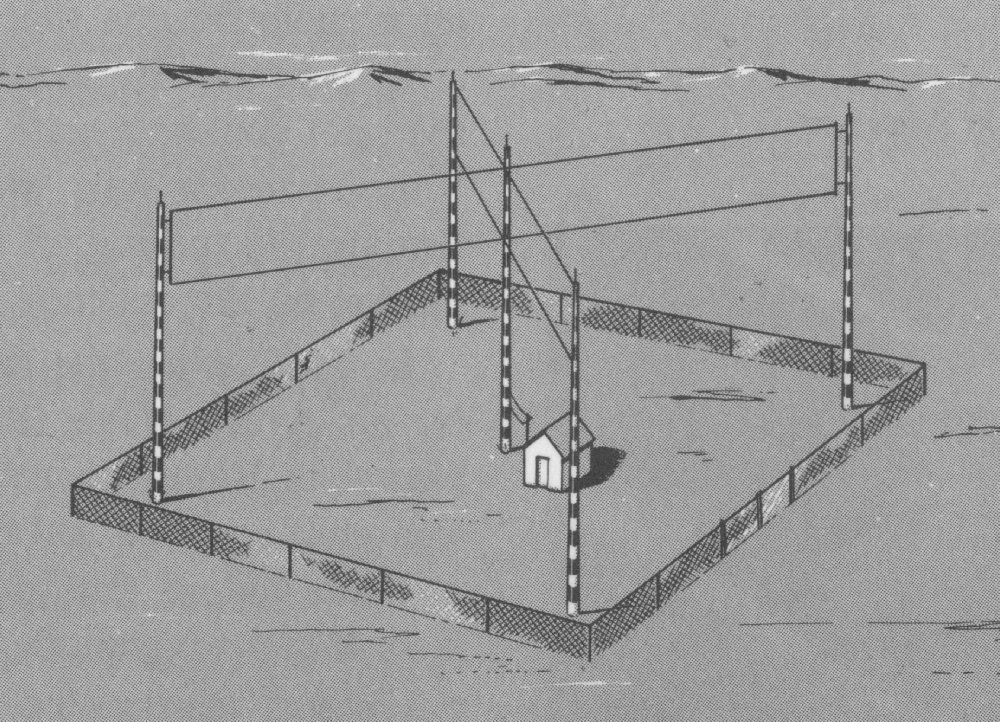
  - Early low-frequency radio station based on crossed loop antennas; later installations used Adcock antennas for improved performance.
    February – November – (United States) Introduction / operational rollout of the low-frequency "four-course" radio range (LFR / AN range) and expansion of airway radio beacons in the U.S. used on revenue airmail routes, starting with demonstrations / first operational ranges in early 1928, followed by revenue flights later in the year. These ground-based radio beams and beacon/light networks made scheduled night and all-weather airmail/cargo operations safer and more reliable.
- 1929
- 1929 in aviation

== Pictures from the decade ==
air cargo and airmail in the decade 1920-1929

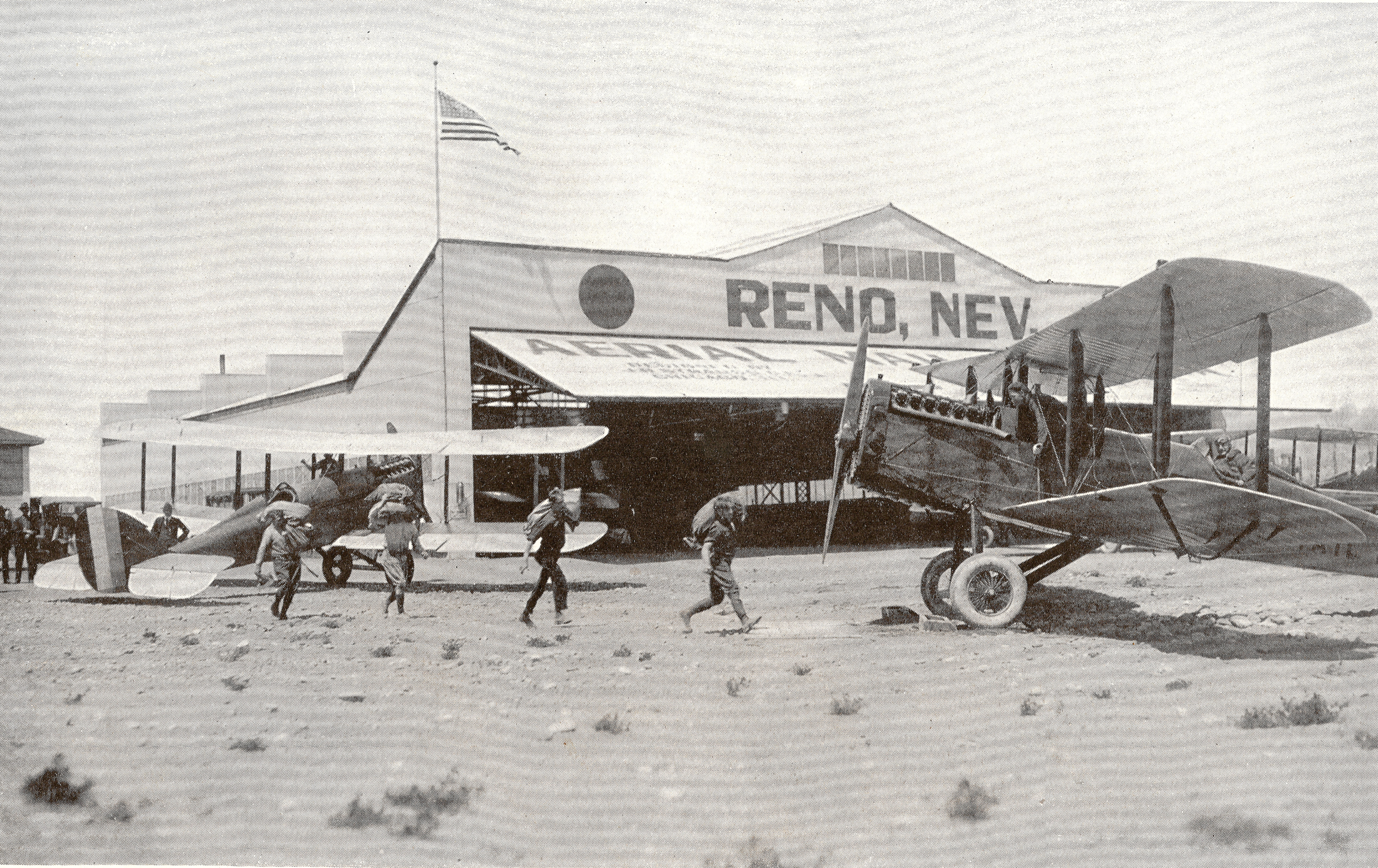
Airmail employees transferring airmail bags from one de Havilland (DH-4B) aircraft to another at the Reno, Nevada airmail field. On September 8, 1920, the Post Office Department completed the western leg of the nation's transcontinental flyway. Mail was flown through Reno on its way between San Francisco, California and New York City. The 1921 "Transcontinental Air Mail Pilot's Log of Distances, Landmarks, and Flying Directions" provided to all airmail employees described Reno's airmail field as follows: "The air mail field at Reno lies two miles west of the city. The main runway lies east and west. The field is marked by a T and wind indicator. And landing from four ways is unobstructed. Reno is 4,497 feet above sea level. Whenever possible it is advisable to leave the Reno field on the east-west runway, taking off to the east. A slight downgrade enables the ship to quickly obtain flying speed. Just beyond the east edge of the field the ground is extremely rough and there is a huge ditch here."

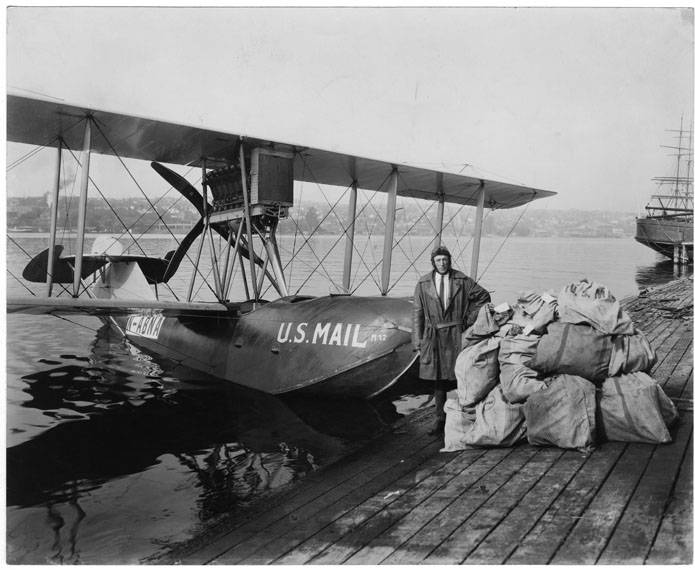
Eddie Hubbard piloted the Boeing B–I flying boat shown here from 1920 to 1927, flying air mail on the first regularly scheduled international airmail route between Seattle and Victoria, B.C.. The plane could carry two passengers plus mail and cargo. After seven years of service without losing a single piece of mail, the B-1 was retired from airmail service in 1927. The plane now hangs on exhibit at the Museum of History & Industry in Seattle.

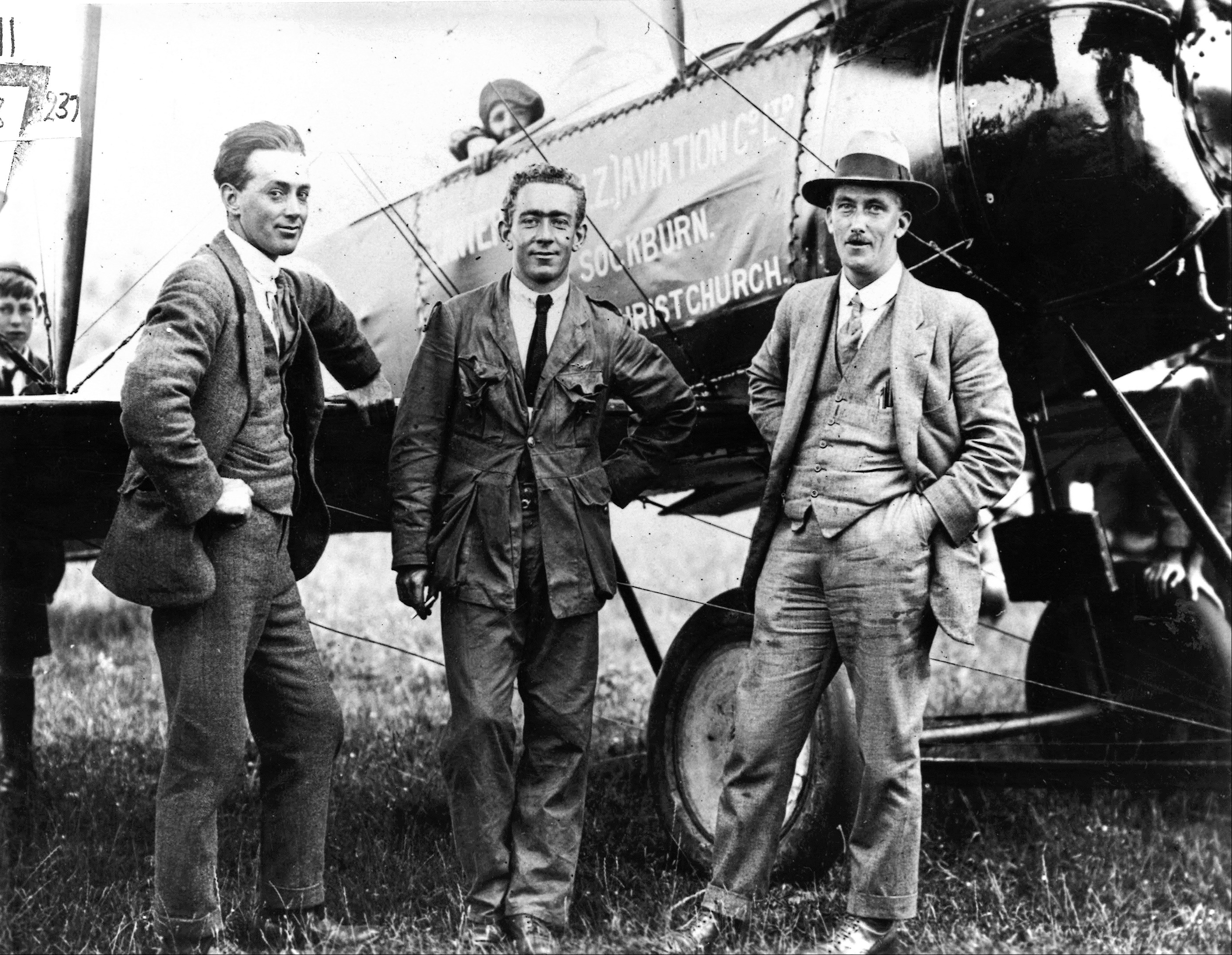
Canterbury Aviation Company's airmail service, 1920s. On 31 January 1921, just months after making the first airmail crossing between the North and South Islands, Captain Euan Dickson flew the first regular airmail service flight in New Zealand. This first flight of the Canterbury Aviation Company's new airmail service left Christchurch at 8 am, carrying several hundred letters to Ashburton and Timaru into the teeth of a south-westerly gale.

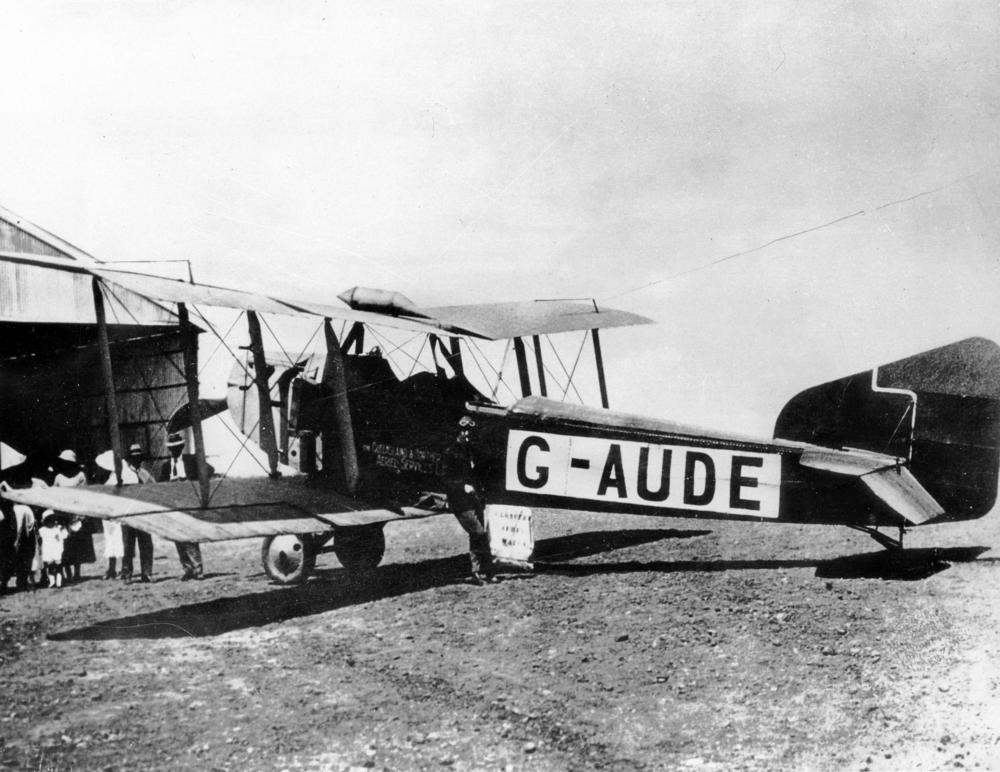
QANTAS aircraft, the Armstrong Whitworth FK8, ca. 1922 This aircraft was one of the original QANTAS airmail fleet in 1922. The plane was used for the first regular QANTAS service between Charleville and Cloncurry. It was a surplus World War I plane. G-AUDE.

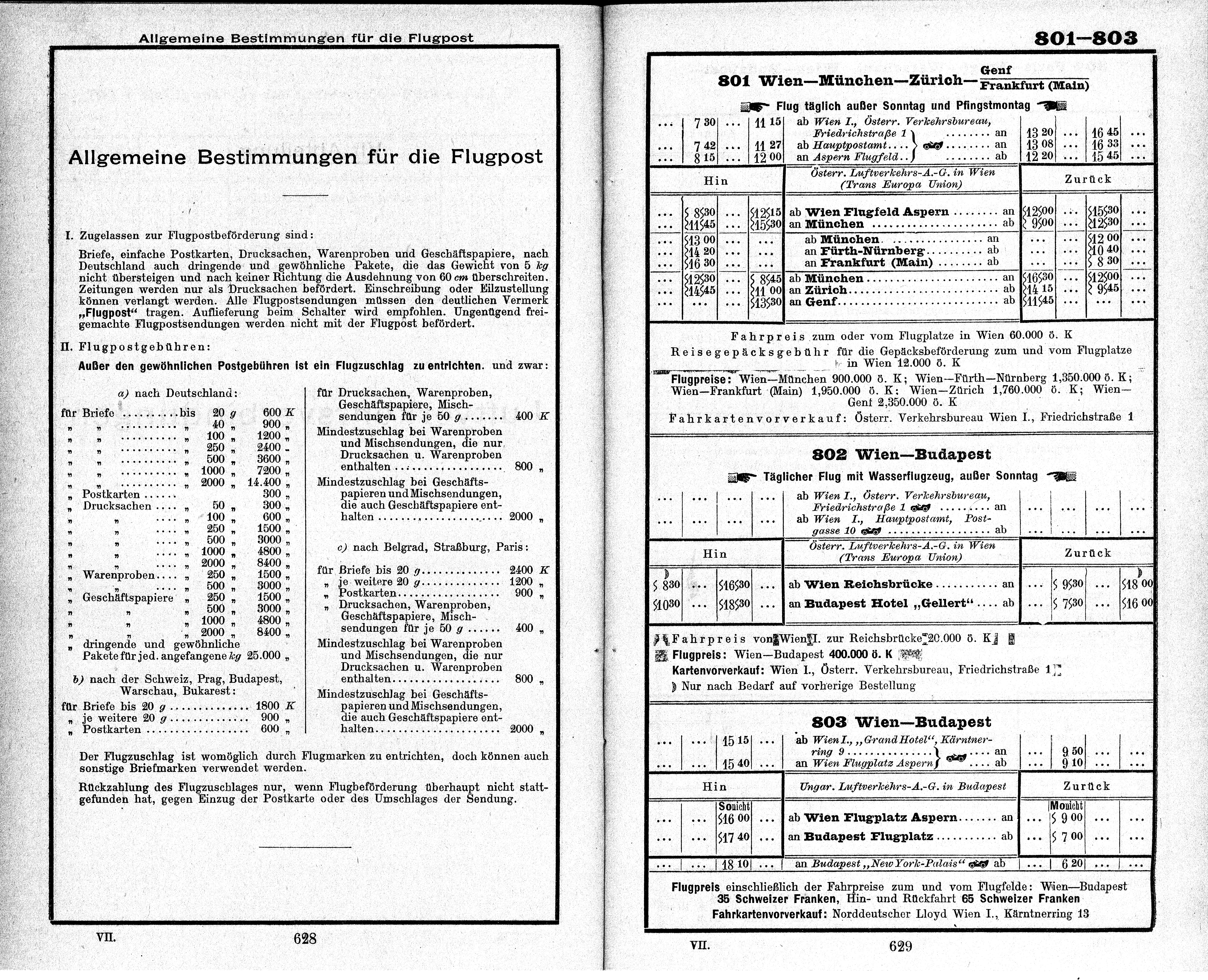
Flight plans for connections from Vienna (airfield in Aspern and for seaplanes: landing site at the Reichsbrücke), Munich, Zurich, Geneva, Frankfurt am Main, Budapest. General provisions for airmail, 1924.

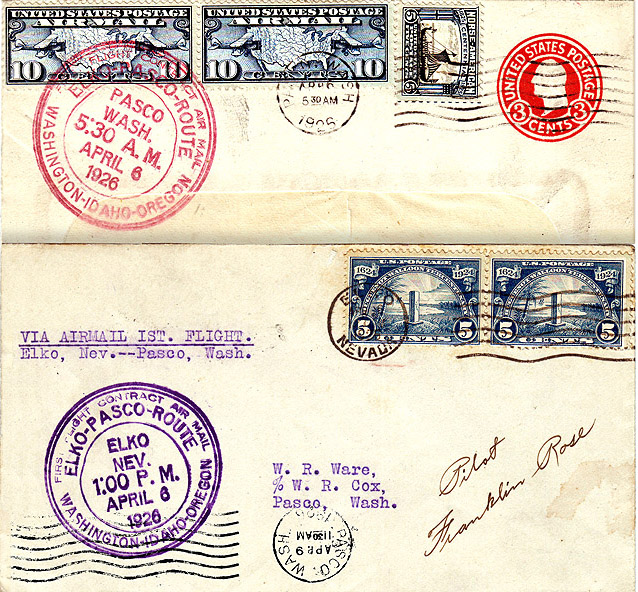
Covers flown Eastbound (top) and Westbound (bottom) on the first flights on CAM-5 between Pasco, WA, and Elko, NV, USA. April 6, 1926.

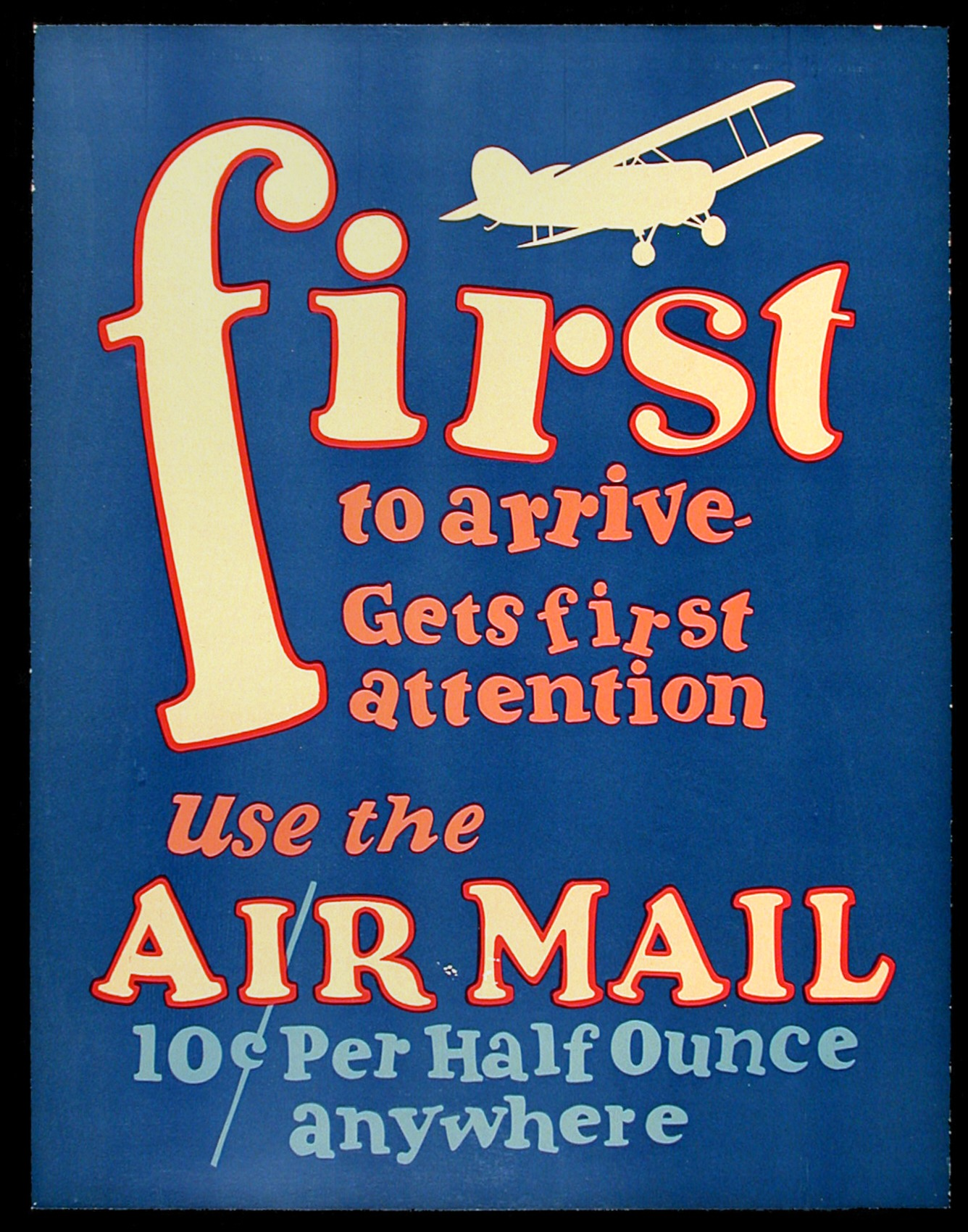
U.S. Airmail poster advertising the ten-cent rate, 1927. This airmail poster reminded its audience that airmail is good for business. It announces that the "first to arrive gets first attention". Text at the bottom of the poster reminds readers of the new ten cents per half-ounce airmail rate. The poster includes an illustration of a biplane at the top. Businesses were generally supportive of airmail service and were among its most frequent users during the service's first decade. The Post Office Department used this poster increase that customer base. The price for airmail bounced up and down over the next few years, with rates tied to different levels of service, including distance. On February 1, 1927, when this poster was published, airmail rates were set at ten cents per half-ounce.

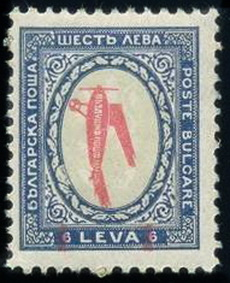
Stamp Bulgaria 1927.

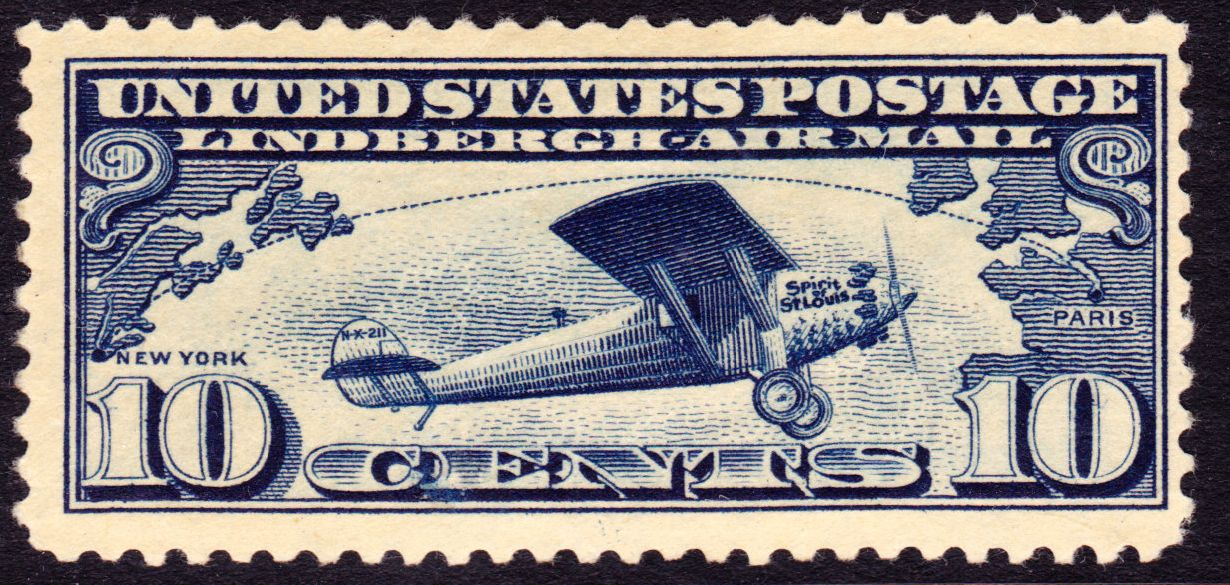
Stamp Spirit of St Louis 1927 Issue-10c.

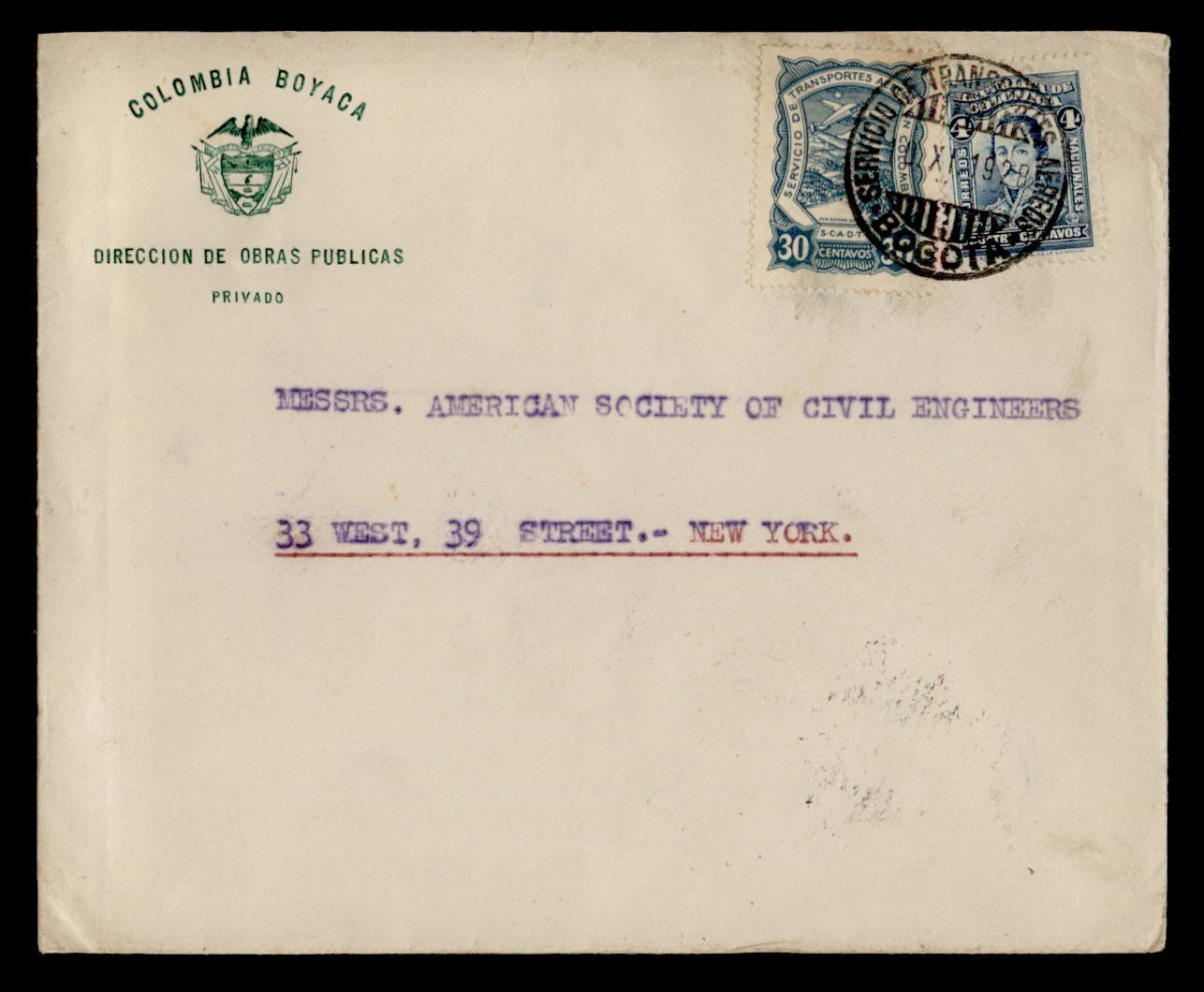
Colombia SCADTIA airmail Bogota to USA cover front, 1928.

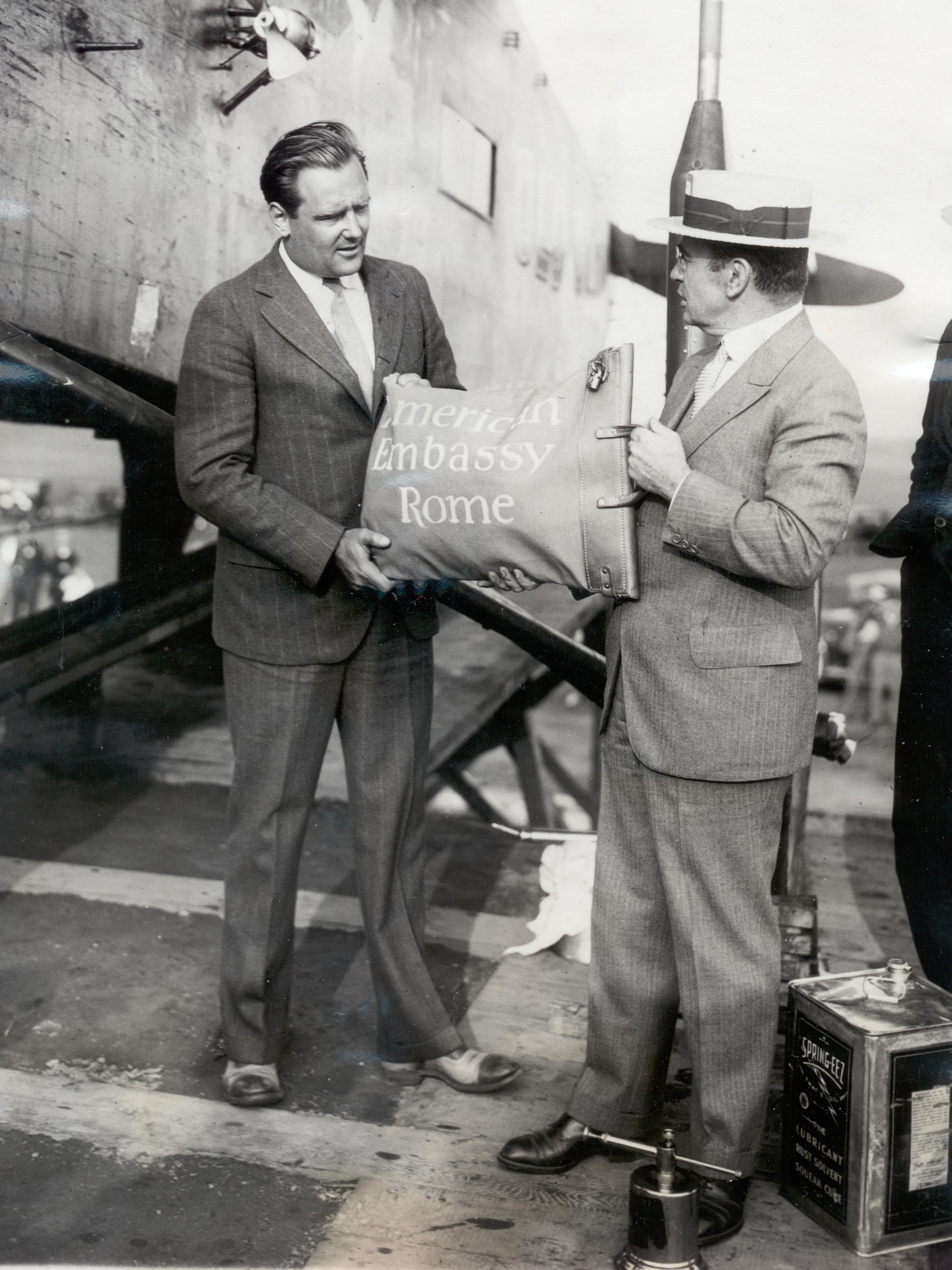
Photograph of airmail pilot Lloyd Bertaud and unidentified individual. After his years in the airmail service, Lloyd Bertaud continued to try and make aviation history. He and an old airmail buddy, James DeWitt Hill, were swept up in the excitement of record making flights in these early aviation years. They decided to try for a distance record-making trip Rome. The pair were sponsored by newspaper giant William Randolph Hearst and accompanied on their flight by Philip Payne, a Hearst employee. The pair took off in a Fokker F.VIIA monoplane they named Old Glory from an airfield in Maine on September 6, 1927. At about 4 am the next morning Bertaud radioed a pair of distress calls. The nearest ship reached an assumed crash area later that morning, but was unable to find any sign of the plane or crew. Hearst sent a chartered ship, the SS Kyle, to the search area. Five days after Bertaud's distress calls the Kyle's crew discovered Old Glory's wreckage. There was no sign of the crew.

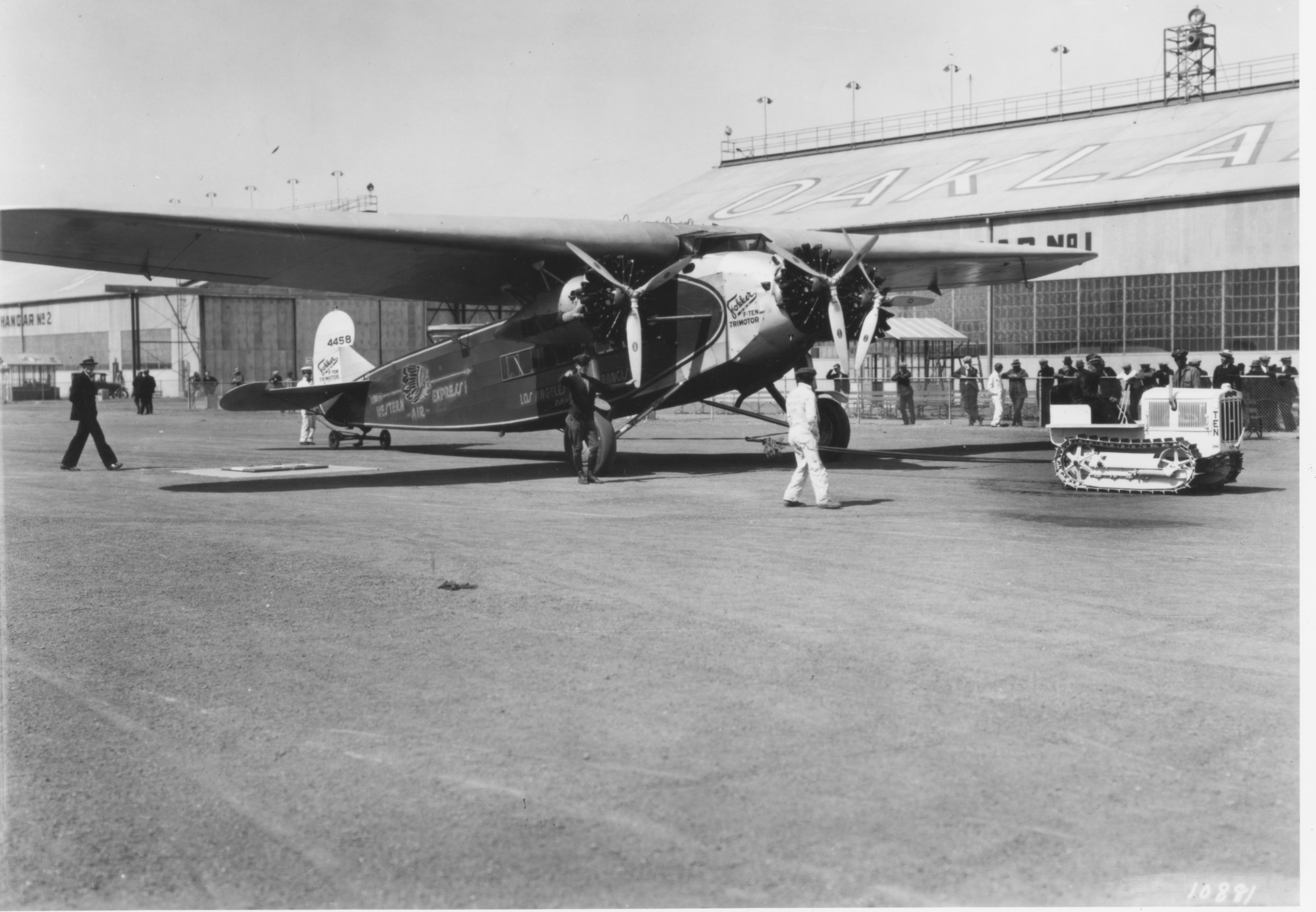
Fokker F-10 super tri-motor airplane marked with the name "Fokker F-Ten" on the tarmac at the Oakland, California, airport. This airplane was one of five used by Western Air Express to carry mail and passengers on its Los Angeles San Francisco route in the late 1920s.

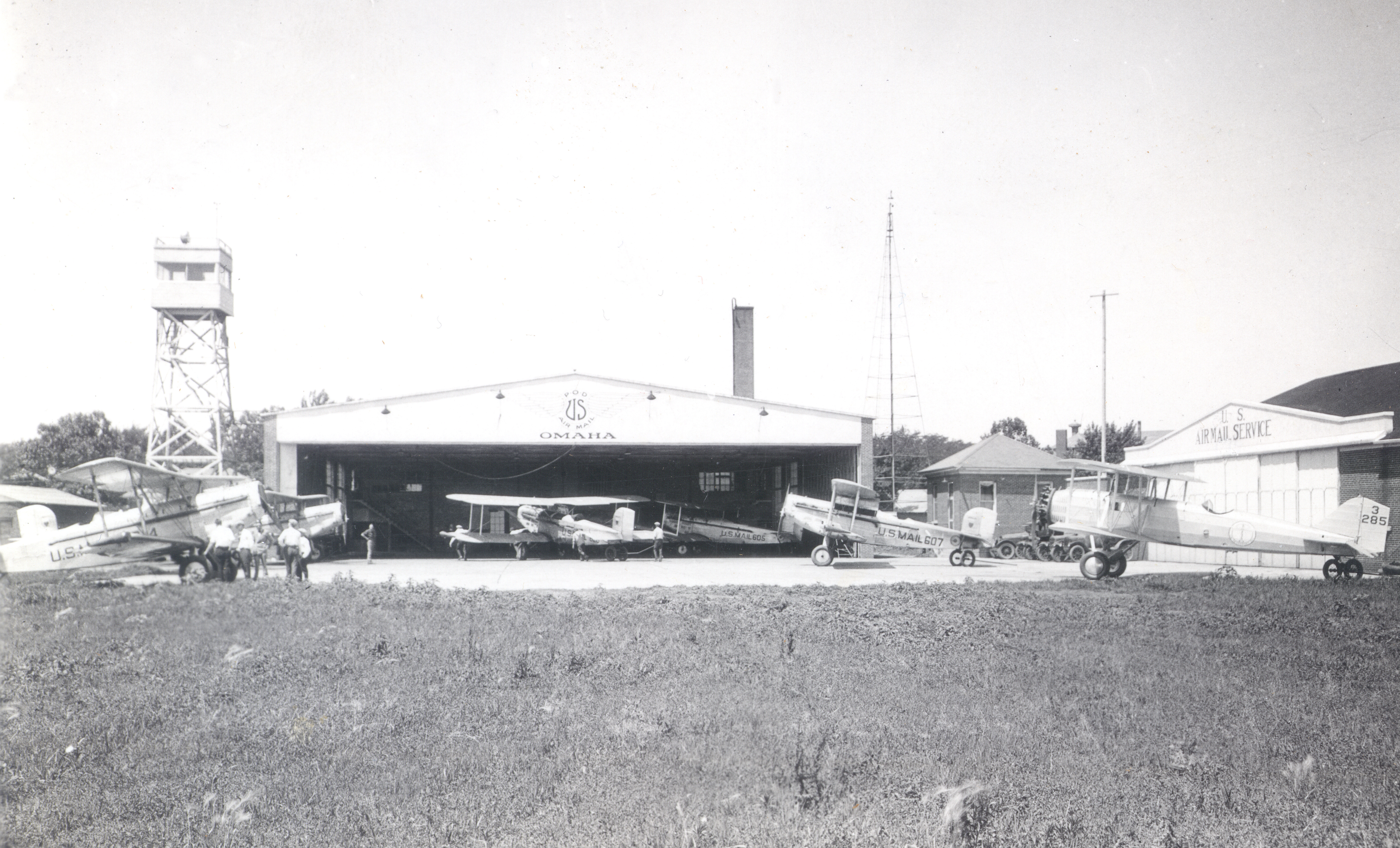
Airmail planes at Omaha, Nebraska USA. The Post Office Department constructed hangars for their use at this Omaha, Nebraska airmail field. Omaha was part of the transcontinental flyway between New York City to San Francisco, California. A group of mail airplanes are parked in front of the main hangar. Most of the craft are Douglas M-3 or M-4 airplanes. A Boeing Model 40 aircraft is parked at the far right of the photograph. These airplanes were among those built as part of a search by postal officials for a successor to the de Havilland DH-4B, an airplane that was nicknamed the workhorse of the early airmail service. Although the Douglas planes were used for airmail service under the Department, the Boeing was not; the one here is with Boeing Air Transport. Both airplanes were used in the later 1920s by commercial aviation companies.

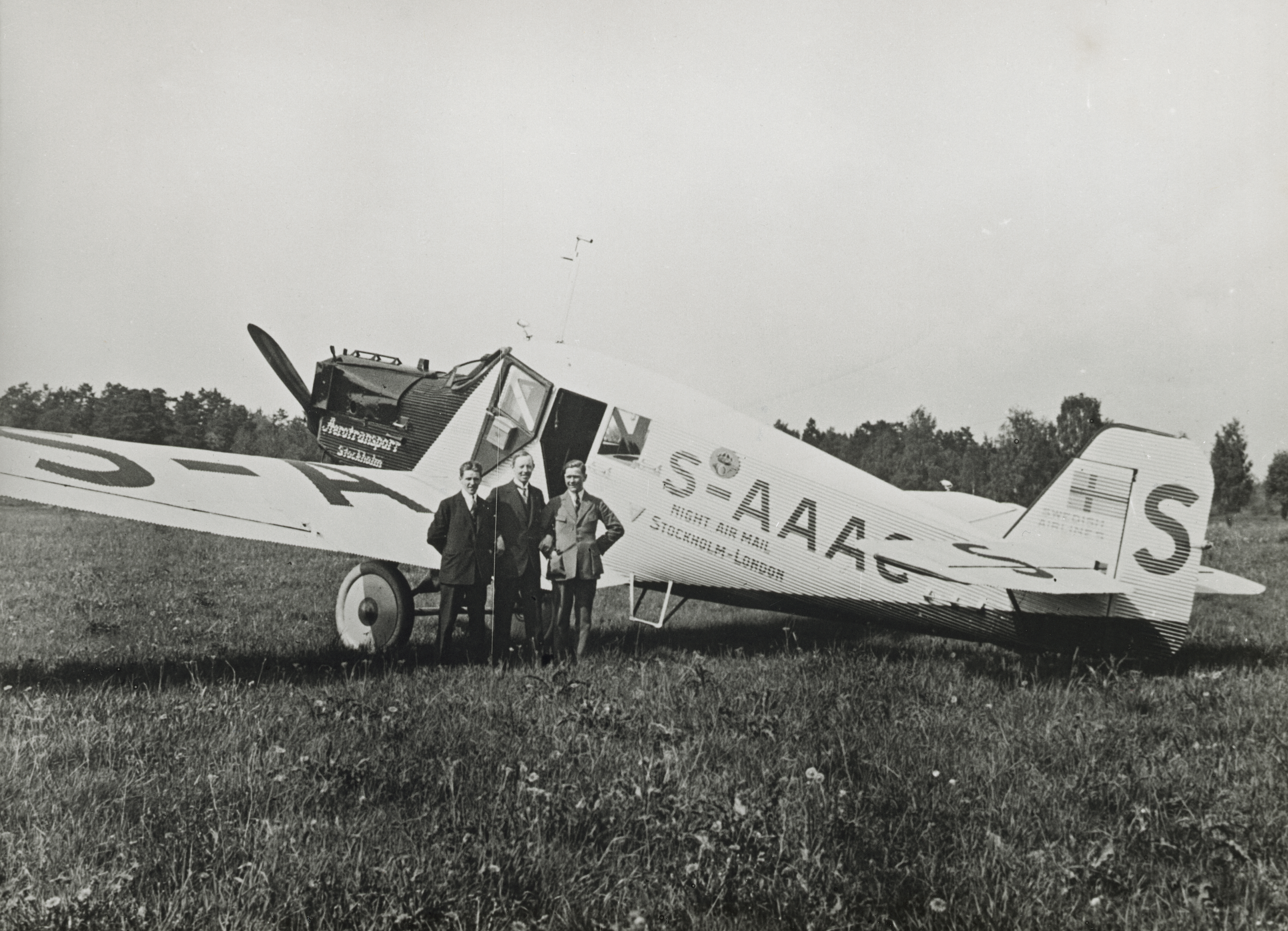
Cargo. ABA - AB Aerotransport begin to fly June 18th 1928, night air mail flights between Stockholm - London. Junkers F13 Dalsland S-AAAC, today in Stockholm Tekniska Museet.

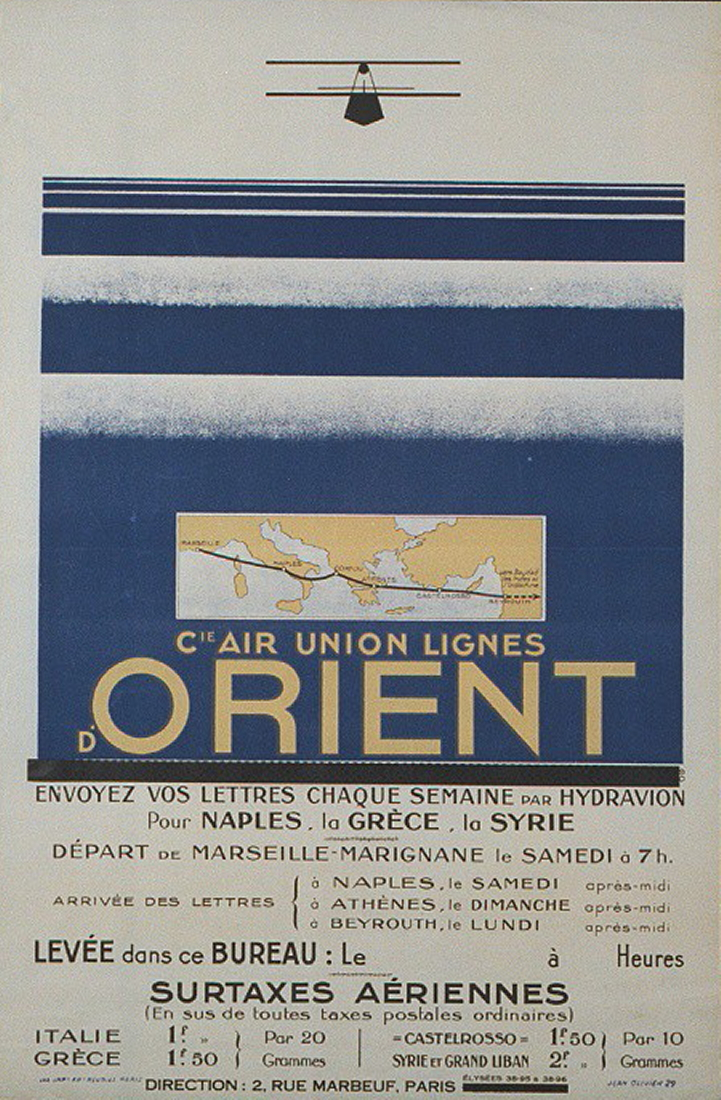
Air Union Orient poster for airmail by seaplane into the Mediterranean, c.1929

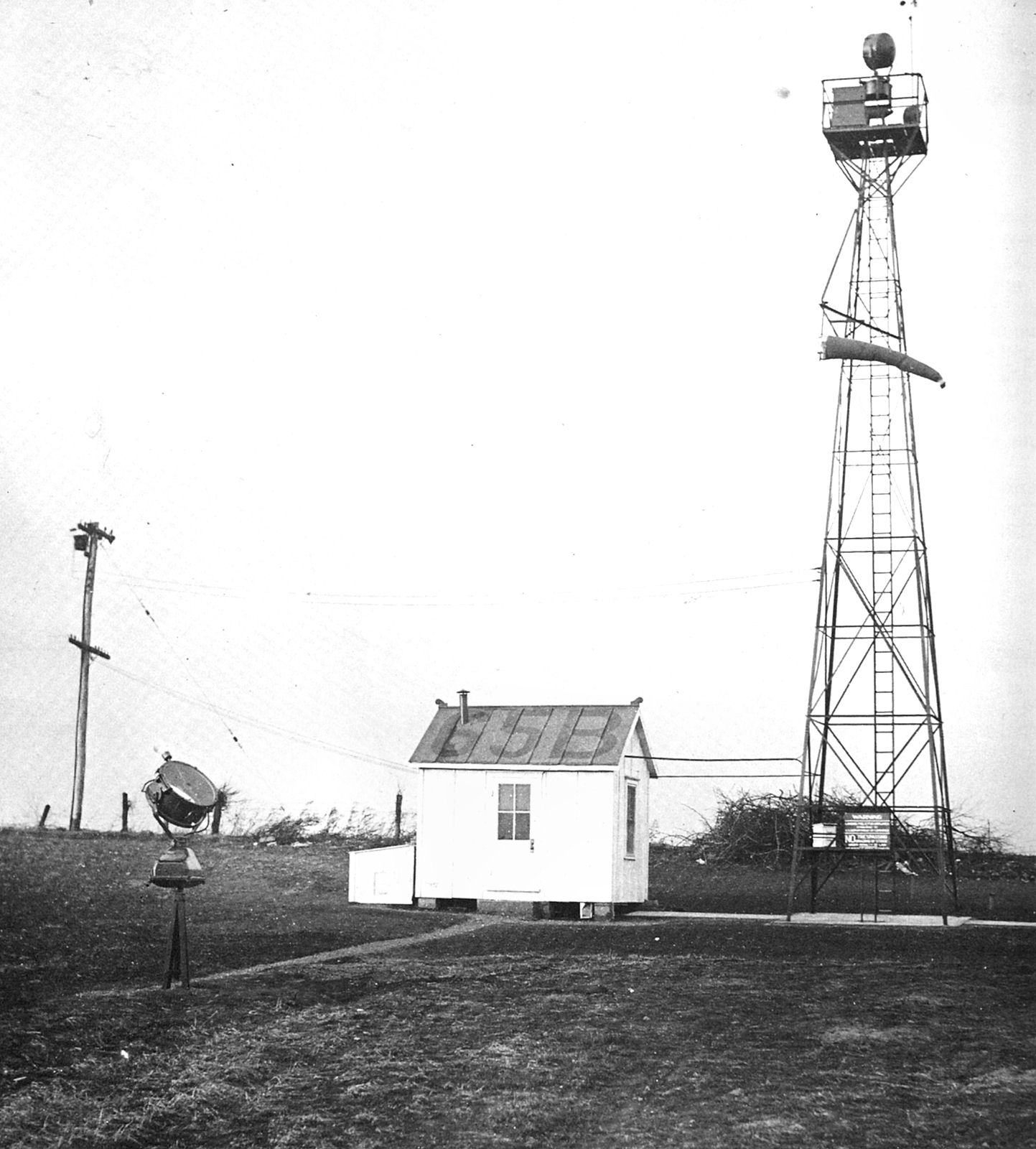
Airmail Station and Rotating Beacon at the Allentown Airport, Pennsylvania, United States, 1929.

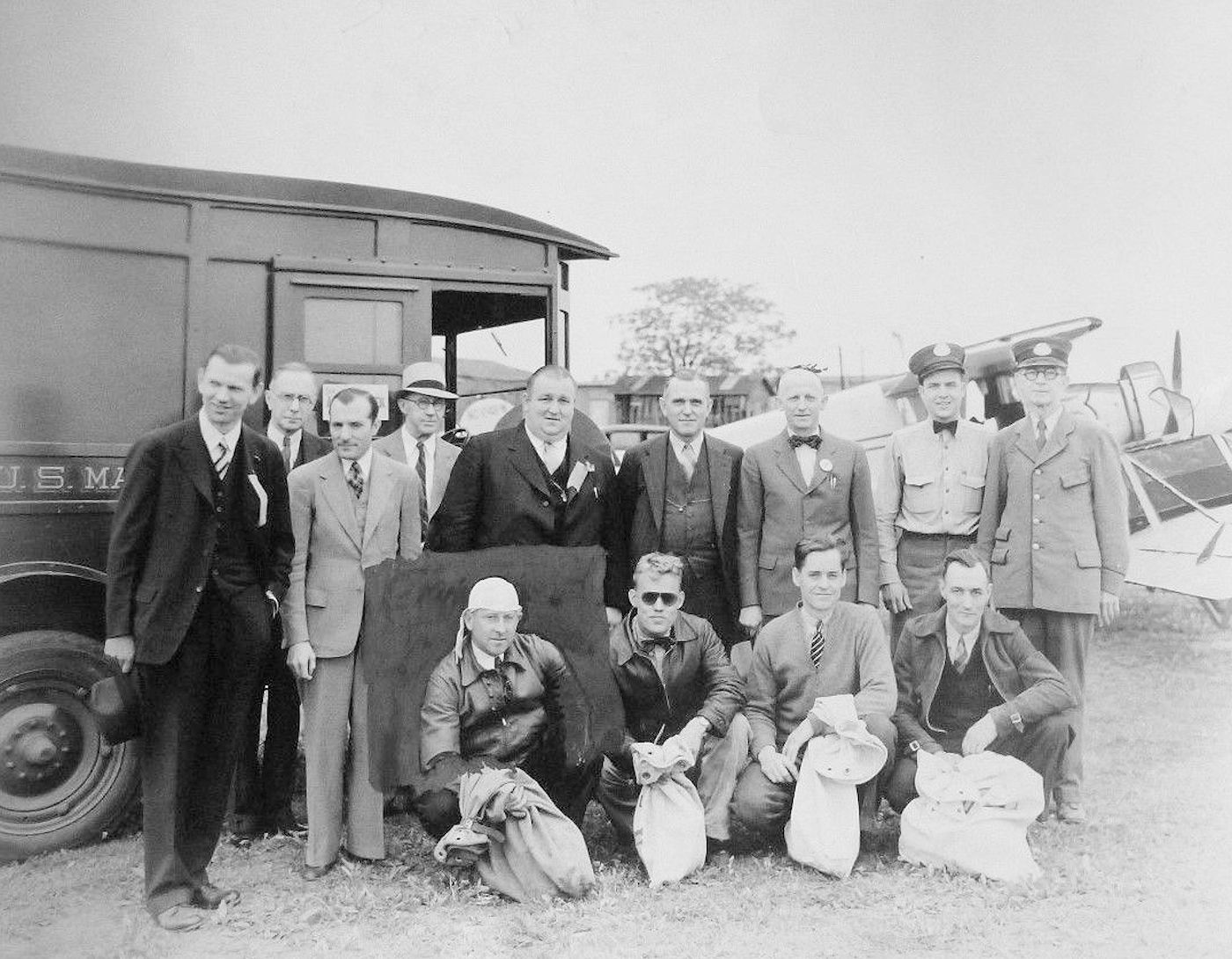
Airmail Pilots at Allentown Airport - Allentown PA, USA, 1929.

== See also ==
- Timeline of Air Cargo
- 1910s in air cargo
- 1930s in air cargo
- 1940s in air cargo
- 1950s in air cargo
- 1960s in air cargo
