= Ford National Reliability Air Tour =

Recurring air race

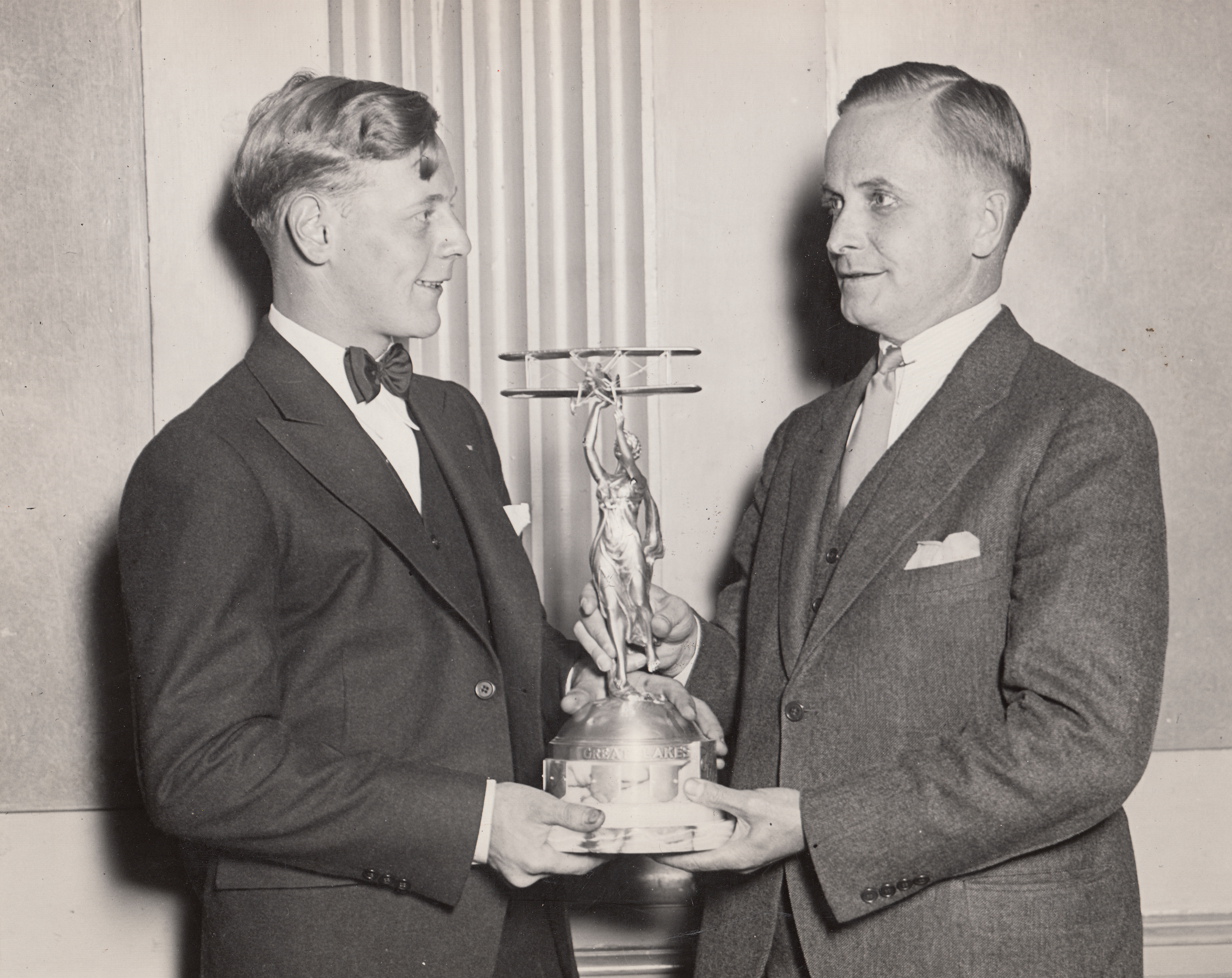
Eddie August Schneider accepting the Great Lakes Trophy from David Vincent Stratton of the Great Lakes Aircraft Corporation in Detroit, Michigan, on September 27, 1930.

The Ford Reliability Tour, properly called The National Air Tour for the Edsel B. Ford Reliability Trophy, was a series of aerial tours sponsored in part by Ford Motor Company from 1925 to 1931 and re-created in 2003. Top prize was the Edsel Ford Reliability Trophy. Henry and Edsel Ford were shareholders in the Stout Engineering Company. In August 1925, they purchased the entire company, making it the Stout Metal Airplane Division of the Ford Motor Company. Their product, the Stout 2-AT Pullman, was a featured plane. The plane was also used by their new airline the Ford Air Transport Service, which started regular flights in April 1925. The tours — which began and ended at Ford Airport in Dearborn, Michigan — cross-marketed Ford and Stout and showcased Ford's new interest in aviation. On September 27, 1925, The New York Times reported, "The object of the tour is to 'sell' aviation by proving that airplanes can carry freight and passengers long distances safely and quickly."

== Awards ==
- Edsel B. Ford Reliability Trophy
- Great Lakes Trophy was awarded in 1930 and 1931 to the fastest plane with an engine of 510 cubic inches (8,357 cubic centimetres) or less.

== 1925 National Air Tour ==
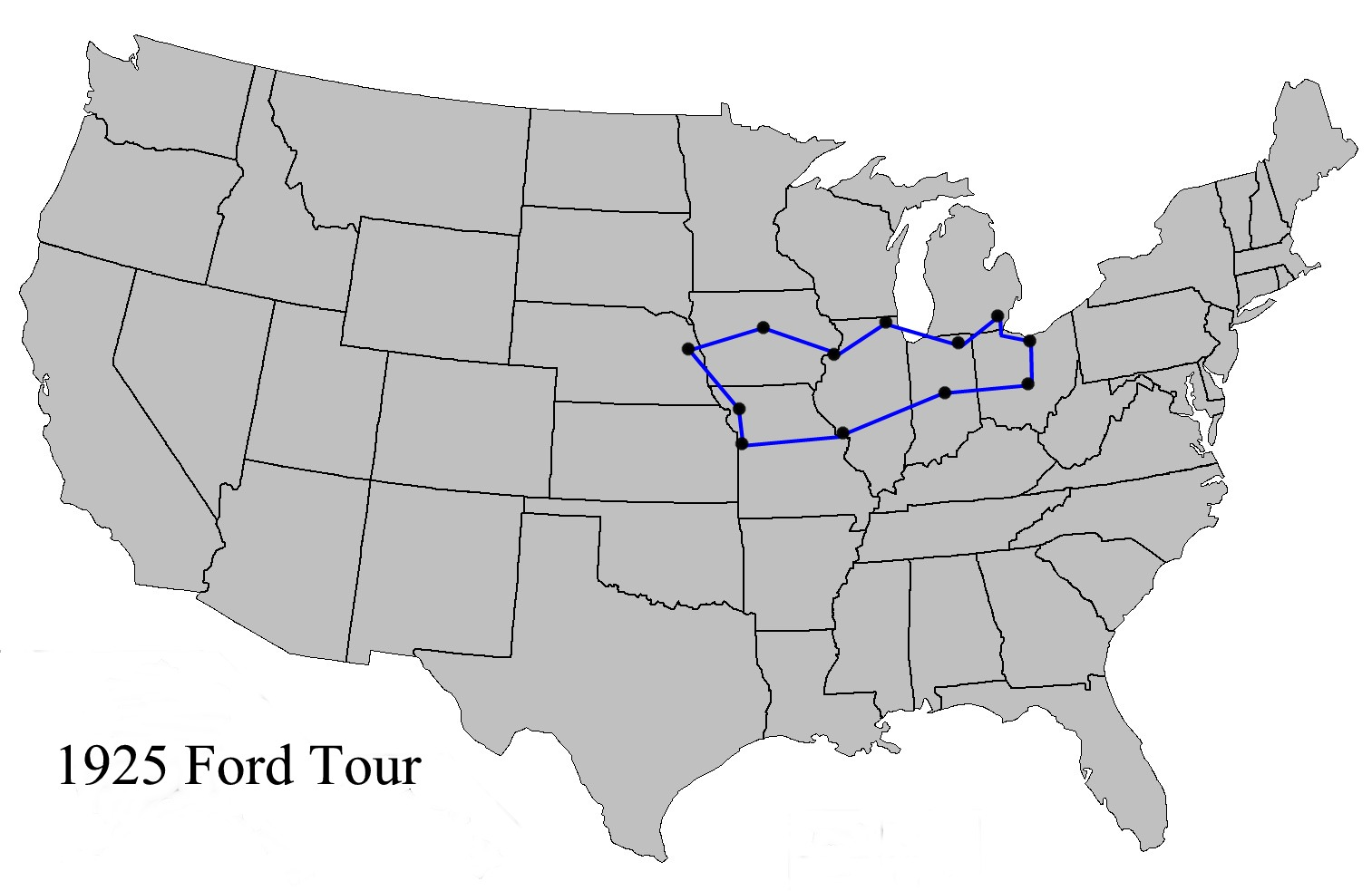
1925 Ford Tour route

This was called the First Annual Aerial Reliability Tour, sponsored by the Society of Automotive Engineers, with prizes for completion. Participants flew a 1,775-mile (1,542 nmi; 2,857 km) route in ten legs, with stops in Chicago and Moline, Illinois; Des Moines, Iowa; Omaha, Nebraska; St. Joseph, Kansas City, and St. Louis, Missouri; Indianapolis, Indiana; and Columbus and Cleveland, Ohio. Eleven entrants — including Walter Beech and Earl Rowland — receive perfect scores. Two of the larger planes — the Fokker 3F7 and the Stout 2-AT Pullman — bypassed the Des Moines stop because Fisher Field's runway was only 1,400 feet (427 metres) long.

September 28, 1925, to October 4, 1925: 20 entered, 17 starters, 11 with a perfect score.

Perfect Scores (unless noted) –

- E.K. Campbell – Travel Air A
- Francis "Chief" Bowhan – Travel Air B.6
- Walter Beech – Travel Air B.6
- Fred Melchoir – Junkers F.13L (second prize)
- E. G. Knapp – Waco (fourth prize – damaged in forced landing)
- L. O. Yost – Waco
- J. Stauffer – Swallow '25 (second prize)
- Earl Rowland – Swallow '26
- P. Lott – Fokker 3F7
- Casey Jones – Curtiss Carrier Pigeon
- Gy Caldwell – Martin Commercial
- L.B. Richardson – Martin Commercial
- H.C. Mummert – Mercury Jr. (third prize)
- E.G. Hamilton – Stout 2-AT Pullman
- H.C. Etten – Laird Special (second prize)
- E.A. Goff – Laird Swallow (second prize)
- W.J. Adams – Yackey

== 1926 National Air Tour ==
The 1926 Air Tour started at Ford Field on August 7, 1926. The event featured the unveiling of the prototype Ford Flivver. There was a field of 25 contestants. A new scoring system for time to "stick" and "unstick" aircraft to the ground helped promote the use of brakes, which were unpopular at the time. The tour followed a 2,585-mile (2,246 nmi; 4,160 km) course that included stops at Kalamazoo, Michigan; Chicago, Illinois; Milwaukee, Wisconsin; St. Paul, Minnesota; Des Moines, Iowa; Lincoln, Nebraska; Wichita, Kansas; Kansas City, Missouri; Moline, Illinois; Indianapolis, Indiana; Cincinnati and Cleveland, Ohio; Fort Wayne, Indiana.

The new Ford Trimotor had a prop failure that shook loose one landing gear and an engine on one side. The plane landed hard in a field at Nova, Ohio. Walter Beech won in a Travel Air aircraft.

- A Pitcairn PA-2 Sesquiwing won in two of the classes.
- A Buhl-Verville CA-3 Airster placed second.
- Clarence E. Clark placed seventh in a Travel Air 3000.
- Vance Breese placed eighth in a Ryan M-1.

== 1927 National Air Tour ==
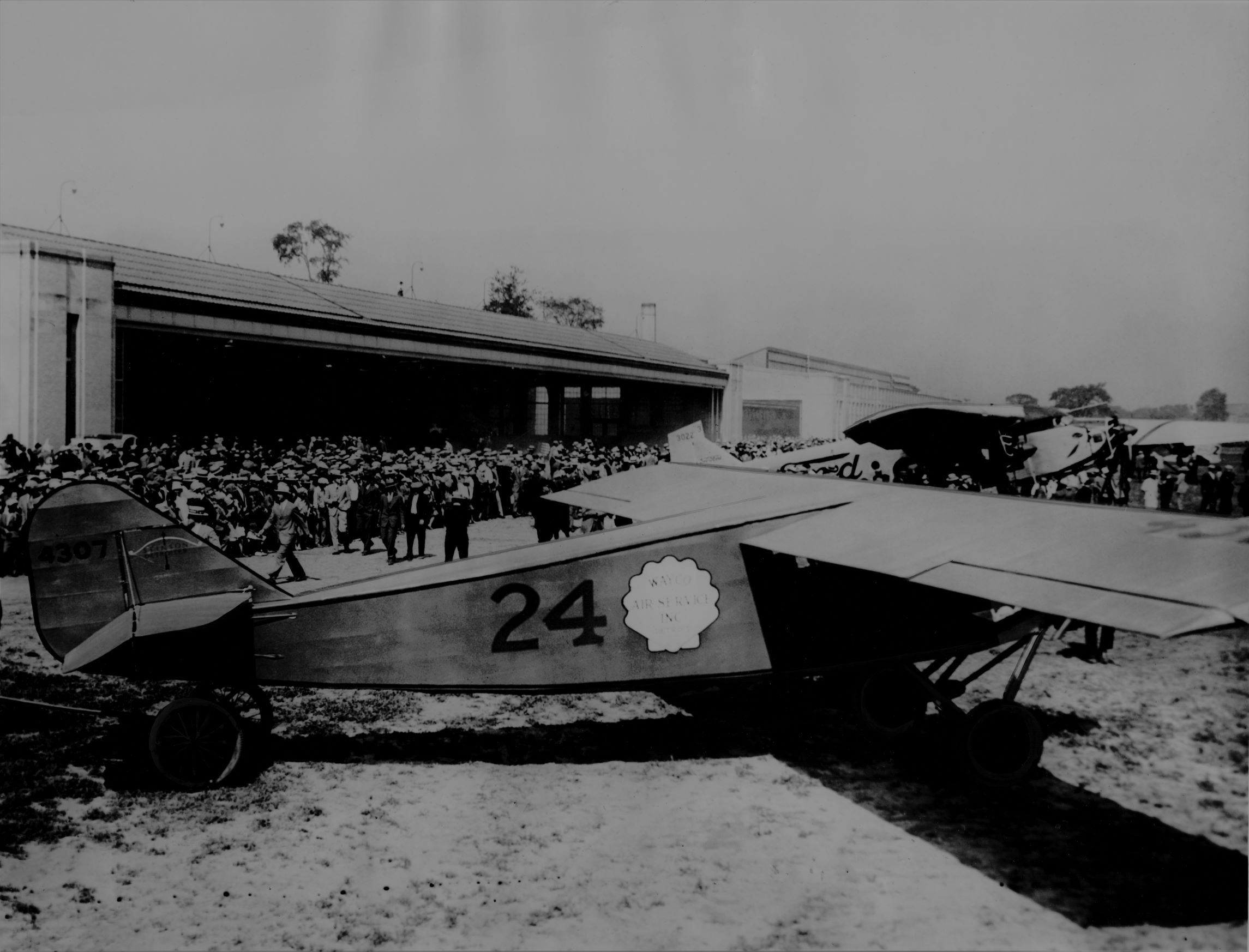
The 1927 tour's winning Stinson SM-1 Detroiter (foreground) with a Ford Trimotor (background) on June 28, 1927.

In 1927, fourteen contestants competed in the air tour. Held from June 27 to July 12, the tour covered more than 4,121 miles (3,581 nmi; 6,632 km), with stops at Buffalo, Geneva, and Schenectady, New York; Boston, Massachusetts; New York City; Philadelphia, Pennsylvania; Baltimore, Maryland; Pittsburgh, Pennsylvania; Cleveland, Ohio; Kalamazoo, Michigan; Dayton, Columbus, and Cincinnati, Ohio; Louisville, Kentucky; Memphis, Tennessee; Pine Bluff, Arkansas; Dallas, Texas; Oklahoma City and Tulsa, Oklahoma; Wichita, Kansas; Omaha, Nebraska; Moline, Illinois; Hammond, Indiana; and Grand Rapids, Michigan. Edward Stinson was the overall winner in a Stinson SM-1 Detroiter, and the Hamilton H-18 Metalplane Maiden Milwaukee placed second.

== 1928 National Air Tour ==
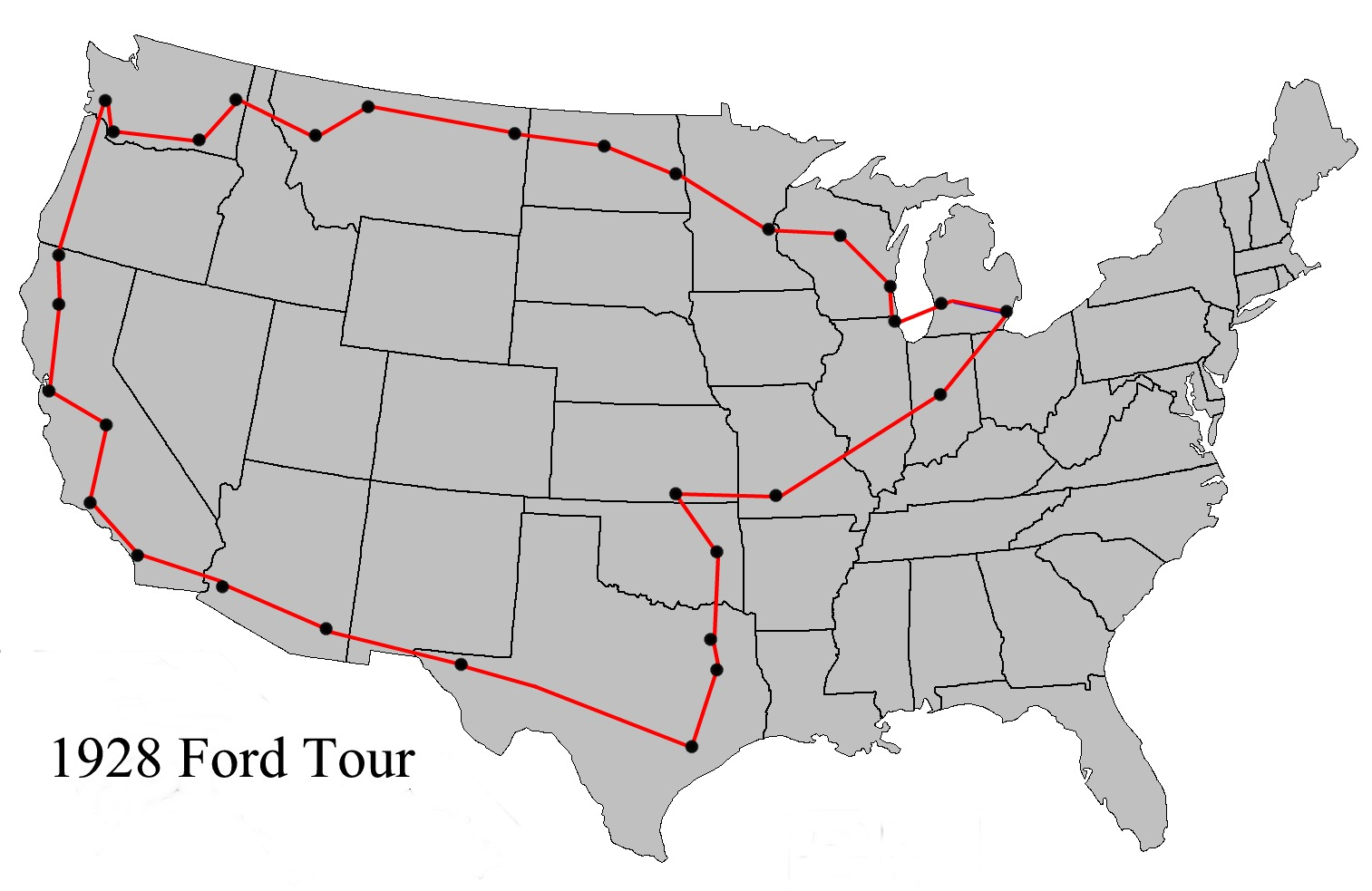
1928 Ford Tour route starting in Dearborn.

The 1928 tour followed a 6,304-mile (5,478 nmi; 10,145 km) route that featured destinations as far west as Washington state. The launch at Ford Airport took place on June 30, the airport's "Air Olympics Day," and was timed to coincide with the 22nd annual James Gordon Bennett Balloon Race, which began the same day as soon as the tour airplanes had departed. The tour made stops at the Indianapolis Speedway in Speedway, Indiana; St. Louis and Springfield, Missouri; Wichita, Kansas; Tulsa, Oklahoma; Fort Worth, Waco, San Antonio, Marfa, and El Paso, Texas; Tucson and Yuma, Arizona; San Diego, Los Angeles, Fresno, San Francisco, and Corning, California; Medford and Portland, Oregon; Tacoma and Spokane, Washington; Missoula, Great Falls, and Froid, Montana; Minot and Fargo, North Dakota; St. Paul, Minnesota; Wausau and Milwaukee, Wisconsin; Chicago, Illinois, and Battle Creek, Michigan. The tour concluded at Dearborn on July 28.

Flying a Monocoupe, Phoebe Omlie became the first female air tour pilot. The route placed racers in San Francisco at Mills Field Municipal Airport (the future San Francisco International Airport), the same airfield where the World War I flying movie Hell's Angels was filming.

The winner was John P. Wood in the Waco 10 The Baby Ruth.

== 1929 National Air Tour ==
The 1929 tour was flown from October 5 to October 21 over a 5,017-mile (4,360 nmi; 8,074 km) route that included the first tour stops outside the United States. Thirty-five contestants entered, of which 29 actually started. After departing Dearborn, participants flew into Canada and stopped at Windsor, Toronto, and Ottawa in Ontario and at Montreal in Quebec. They then returned to the United States, stopping at Portland, Maine; Springfield, Massachusetts; New York City; Philadelphia, Pennsylvania; Baltimore, Maryland; Richmond, Virginia; Winston-Salem, North Carolina; Greenville, South Carolina; Augusta, Georgia; Jacksonville, Florida; Macon and Atlanta, Georgia; Nashville, Tennessee; Cincinnati, Ohio; Louisville, Kentucky; St. Louis and Springfield, Missouri; Wichita, Kansas; St. Joseph, Missouri; Des Moines and Cedar Rapids, Iowa; St. Paul, Minnesota; Wausau and Milwaukee, Wisconsin; Moline and Chicago, Illinois; and Kalamazoo, Michigan.

The winner was John Livingston, who flew the 5,107-mile (4,438 nmi; 8,219 km) route averaging 129.97 mph (209.17 km/h) in a Waco. Art Davis, also flying a Waco, placed second.

== 1930 National Air Tour ==
The 1930 tour was held from September 11 to September 27. The 18 entrants flew a 4,814-mile (4,183 nmi; 7,747 km) route with stops at Kalamazoo, Michigan; Chicago, Illinois; Davenport, Iowa; Wausau and Eau Claire, Wisconsin; Duluth, Minnesota; and Grand Forks, North Dakota, before the itinerary took them into Canada. There they made stops at Winnipeg and Brandon, Manitoba; Regina, Moose Jaw, Saskatoon, and North Battleford, Saskatchewan; and Edmonton, Calgary, and Lethbridge, Alberta. They then returned to the United States and stopped at Great Falls, Montana; Sheridan, Casper, and Cheyenne, Wyoming; Denver and Colorado Springs, Colorado; Garden City and Wichita, Kansas; Enid, Oklahoma; Kansas City, Missouri; Springfield, Illinois; Terre Haute, Indiana; and Cincinnati, Ohio.

The finishing order was:

- 1 Harry L. Russell in his Ford Trimotor
- 2 John H. Livingston in WACO CRG 600Y
- 3 Arthur J. Davis in WACO CRG 660Y
- 4 Myron E. Zeller
- 5 George W. Haldeman
- 6 Walter Herschel Beech
- 7 J. Wesley Smith (aviator)
- 8 Eddie August Schneider (plane 21), in his Cessna AW (NC9092), won the Great Lakes Trophy.
- 9 Wadlow
- 10 Bowman
- 11 Story
- 12 Stevenson
- 13 Buch
- 13 Nancy Hopkins (plane 22), in a Viking B-8 Kittyhawk
- 14 Carr
- 15 Meyers
- 16 Harvey Mummert
- 17 James Meissner

== 1931 National Air Tour ==
The seventh and final air tour was held from July 4 to July 25, 1931. The 14 contestants fly a 4,816-mile (4,185 nmi; 7,751 km) route with stops at Windsor, Ontario, Canada; Le Roy and Binghamton, New York; Bradford and Pittsburgh, Pennsylvania; Wheeling, West Virginia; Columbus, Ohio; Huntington, West Virginia; Middlesboro, Kentucky; Knoxville, Nashville, and Memphis, Tennessee; Birmingham and Montgomery, Alabama; Gulfport, Mississippi; New Orleans and Shreveport, Louisiana; Houston, Corpus Christi, San Antonio, and Fort Worth, Texas; Oklahoma City and Ponca City, Oklahoma; Chanute, Kansas; Kansas City, Missouri; Lincoln and Omaha, Nebraska; St. Joseph, Missouri; Davenport, Iowa; Joliet, Illinois; Kalamazoo, Michigan; and Akron, Ohio.

The finishing order was:

- 1 Harry L. Russell, flying a Ford Trimotor.
- 2 James H. Smart.
- 3 Eddie August Schneider, third in a single-engine Cessna AW aircraft, first finisher among light aircraft.
- 4 Lowell Bayles, in a Gee Bee Sportster, won the Great Lakes Trophy.

Time magazine wrote:

Sensation of the meet was the youngster Eddie Schneider, 19, who fell into last place by a forced landing of his Cessna and a three-day delay in Kentucky, then fought his way back to finish third, ahead of all other light planes.

For the first time, a rotary-wing aircraft — the Pitcairn PCA-2 autogiro Miss Champion — took part the event, flying as an "accompanying" (i.e., non-competing) aircraft. Captain Lewis "Lon" Yancey flew Miss Champion between tour stops, while Jim Ray — vice president and chief pilot of Pitcairn — managed the autogiro's high-profile appearances at various cities along the route and piloted Miss Champion in local flight demonstrations at tour stops.

== 1932 National Air Tour cancelled ==
The planned 1932 Air Tour was cancelled for a number of reasons. Lack of financial viability was a key issue: The Great Depression had placed severe financial pressure on municipal budgets, leaving cities and towns that might have hosted pilots participating in the air tour without the funds to host them or to maintain the airports the tour would have used. Furthermore, the Ford Trimotor no longer set the aviation industry standard for airliner technology thanks to the technological advances made by competitors such as Boeing and the Douglas Aircraft Company. Finally, Henry Ford's interest in promoting aviation or expanding his company's aviation ventures had waned since the February 1928 death of his chief test pilot and close friend Harry J. Brooks in an airplane crash. The 1932 tour would have followed an approximately 4,000-mile (6,400 km) route with stops at Kalamazoo, Michigan; South Bend, Indiana; Lansing, Illinois; Milwaukee and Wausau, Wisconsin; Minneapolis, Minnesota; Mason City and Des Moines, Iowa; Kansas City, Missouri; Wichita, Kansas; Tulsa, Oklahoma; Fort Worth, Texas; Shreveport, Louisiana; Little Rock, Arkansas; Memphis, Tennessee; Birmingham, Alabama; Atlanta, Georgia; Greenville, South Carolina; Winston-Salem and Wilson, North Carolina; Richmond, Virginia; Frederick, Maryland; Pittsburgh, Pennsylvania; and Dayton, Ohio.

== 2003 re-creation ==
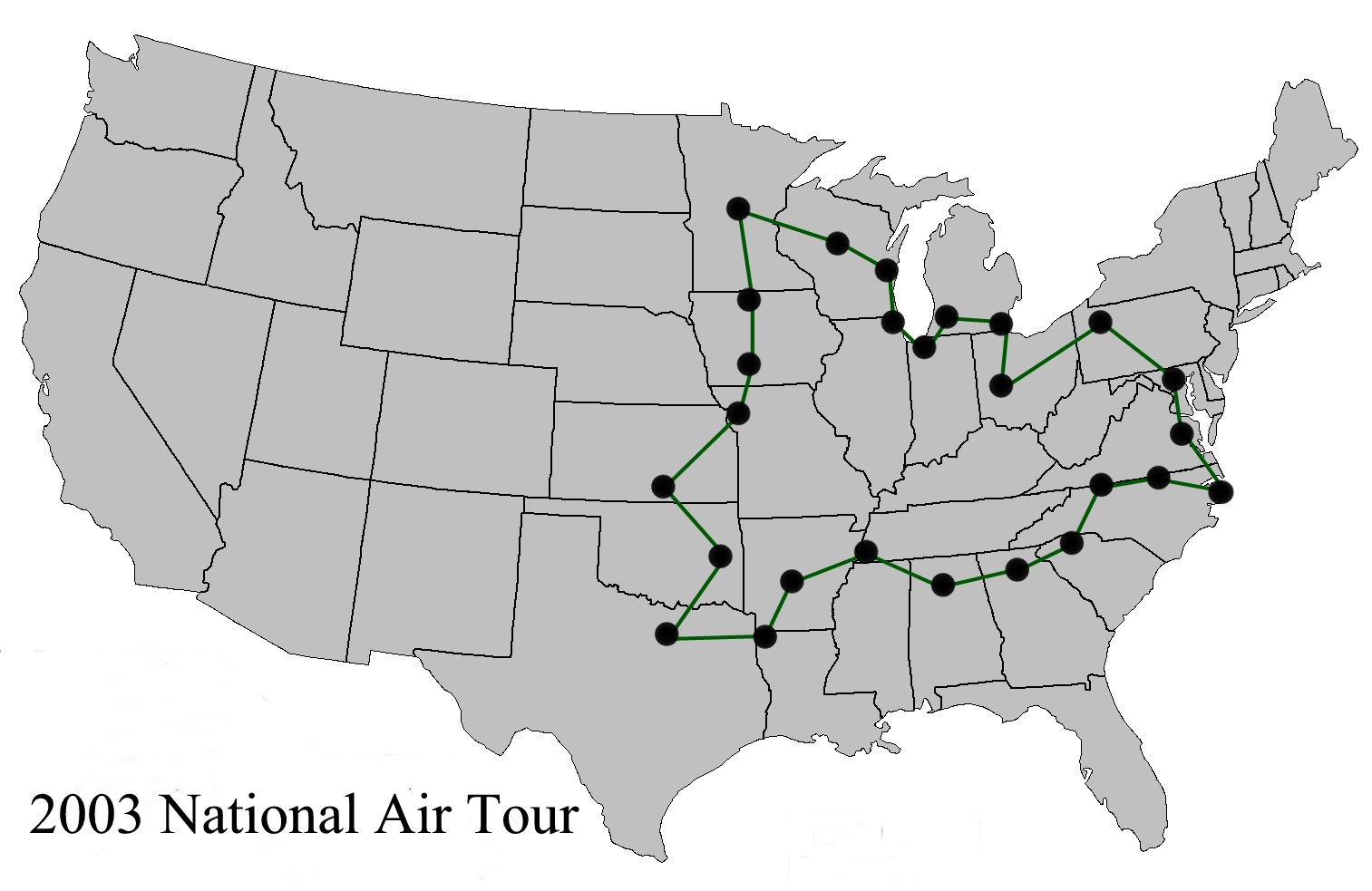
The 2003 National Air Tour route.

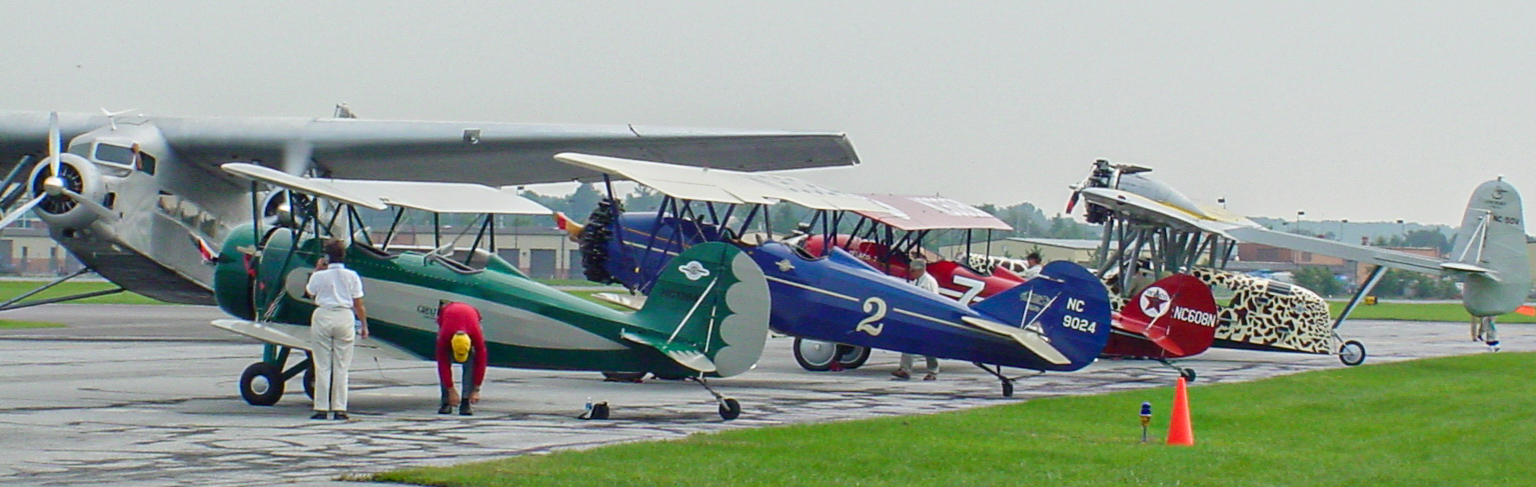
Some of the aircraft that participated in the 2003 National Air Tour, seen during a stop in Frederick, Maryland.

The tour was re-created in 2003 from the plans for the canceled 1932 tour. The 2003 tour, held from September 8 to 24, started and ended in Dearborn, Michigan, circling the eastern half of the United States, with layovers en route at Kill Devil Hills, North Carolina, and Colonel James Jabara Airport in Wichita, Kansas, the latter from September 12 to 15. More than 30 vintage aircraft took part, most from the same period as the original National Air Tours. The 2003 tour covered 4,000 miles (3,500 nmi; 6,400 km) and visited 27 cities.
