= Stout 1-AS Air Sedan =

General information
- Type: Commercial monoplane
- National origin: United States
- Manufacturer: Stout Engineering Company
- Designer: William Bushnell Stout, George H. Prudden

History
- First flight: February 9, 1923

The Stout 1-AS Air Sedan was an all-metal monoplane that was an early example in the Ford Trimotor lineage.

== Development ==
The Air Sedan was Stout's updated version of the Stout Batwing Limousine. William Bushnell Stout, having just completed his famous letter writing financing effort for the company, embarked on a new aircraft using the "thick airfoil" batwing design, combined with all-metal construction employed overseas in Junkers aircraft.

== Design ==
The aircraft was a high wing single engine all-metal aircraft. The pilot and co-pilot sat side-by side, in an open cockpit mounted in the leading edge of the wing. The airfoil's chord stretched half the length of the fuselage, like the earlier batwing. The fuselage was fat and low slung compared to conventional aircraft of the time. Semicircular windows present in other Stout designs were installed.

== Operational history ==
The Air Sedan was tested at Selfridge Field in Mt. Clemens, Michigan on February 9, 1923 by Walter Edwin Lees. The plane was considered underpowered. On one test flight, Lees and the lead engineer, George H. Prudden, took off with Stout as a passenger; they barely kept aloft, and landed in a neighboring field. Later the powerplant was replaced by a 150 hp (112 kW) Hispano-Suiza engine.

== Specifications ==
General characteristics

- Capacity: 4
- Powerplant: 1 × Curtiss OX-5 , 90 hp (67 kW)

Performance
