= Hamilton H-18 =

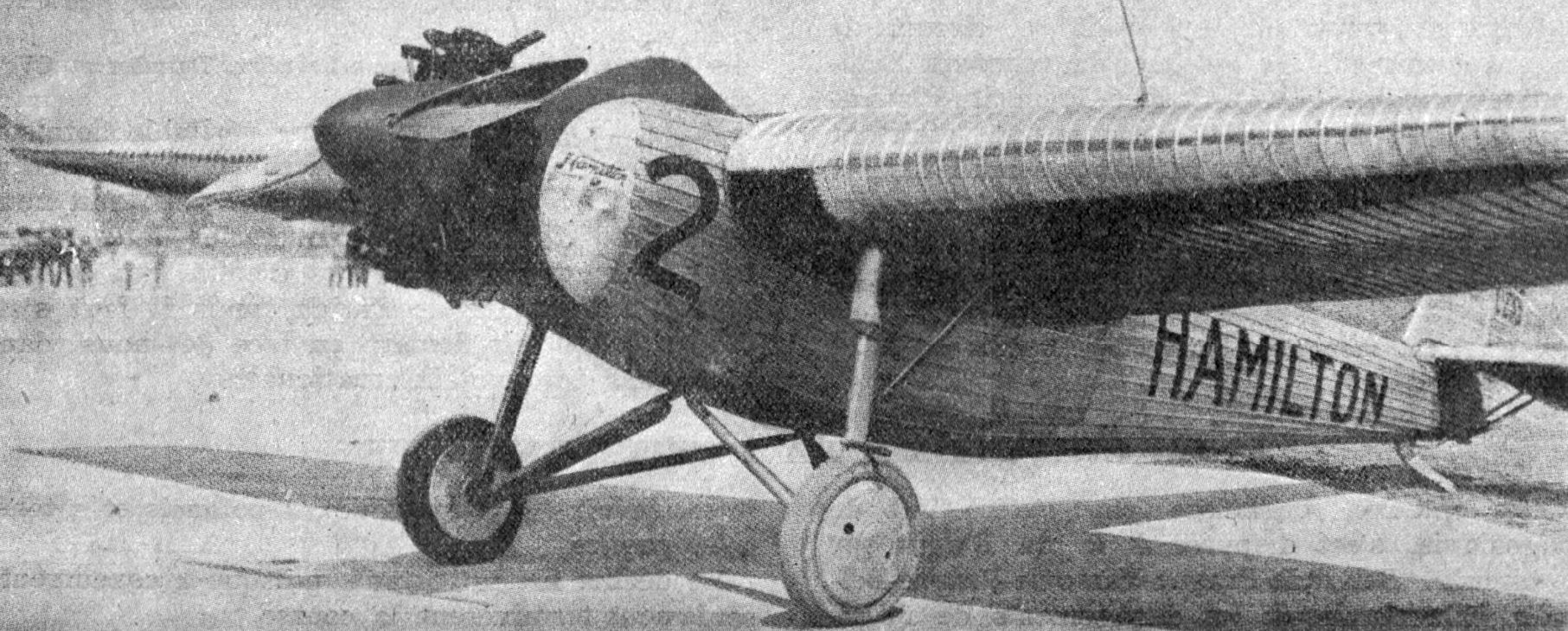

General information
- Type: All-metal, four/five passenger and mail aircraft
- National origin: United States
- Manufacturer: Hamilton Aero Manufacturing Co.
- Designer: James Smith McDonnell and James Cowling
- Number built: 1

History
- First flight: 2 April 1927

The Hamilton H-18 was a 1920s US four/five passenger aircraft. An early all-metal design, it reflected Junkers and Stout design practices. Though it won safety and efficiency awards only one was built.

== Design and development ==
The Hamilton H-18 was an early all-metal commercial US aircraft. Its chief designer was James Smith McDonnell who had previously worked on the Stout 3-AT with its chief designer William Bushnell Stout. Stout had brought Hugo Junkers' methods and experiences of all-metal aircraft construction from Germany to the US during and after World War I and designed the 1924 Stout 2-AT, used for the first scheduled commercial passenger flights in the US.

The H-18's cantilever shoulder wing was tetragonal in plan and was based on three spars. Very thick at the root, it thinned outboard. Like the rest of the H-18, the wings were covered with corrugated metal, Junkers-style, apart from the roots which had Cellon windows in their leading edges and underside. They were bolted onto fuselage wing stubs with their upper surfaces level with its top.

It was powered by a 220 hp (160 kW) Wright Whirlwind J-5 radial engine mounted in the nose with its nine cylinders exposed for cooling. Behind it, the fuselage had an elliptical cross-section. The pilots' side-by-side cockpit, placed over the wing, was completely enclosed but both top and sides could be opened to improve bad weather visibility. The root windows provided a downward view. The second seat could be fitted with dual controls if required or accommodate an extra passenger. Four passengers were seated within the windowless fuselage with the seats placed directly against the open wing roots in the cabin sides so that the occupants had a downward view through the root windows as well as extra elbow room. There was a port-side door for entry to the cabin, which could also be entered via an opening root window or the cockpit. At the rear of the cabin there was a 70 cu ft (2.0 m^{3}) enclosure for luggage or post.

Its tail was angular and had a steel tube structure, again covered with corrugated dural. The fin had a cropped triangular profile and a rectangular rudder. Its rectangular plan tailplane was mounted on top of the fuselage and was externally braced with an upper, single strut to the fin and an underside pair to the fuselage. The elevator also had a rectangular plan apart from large cut-outs for rudder movement.

The H-18's fixed, robust conventional landing gear was designed for bumpy fields, with a wide (9 ft (2.7 m)) track. Its large diameter wheels, fitted with brakes, were on a centrally hinged split axle held between main legs with oleo shock absorbers and near-horizontal drag struts.

For some time this wheeled gear was replaced by floats.

== Operational history ==
The first flight was made on 2 April 1927 and shortly afterwards the prototype was named the Maiden Milwaukee. At the end of the month it was flown to Washington D.C. where it was on display at the Pan American Aero Congress.

In 1927 it took part in the National Reliability Tour. Flown by Randolph Page, it won the second prize of $2,000. In September, flown by John H. Miller it gained second prize at the National Air Races held at Spokane. It also gained prizes for efficiency (first place) and speed (third) in the Detroit News Air Transport Race and first prize for efficiency in an Aviation Town & Country Club of Detroit Trophy contest. These later events brought $1,850 in winnings.

Despite the safety and efficiency awards the H-18 did not sell and only the prototype was built. By 1929 it had been converted by Jesse C. Johnson into an unusual rotary wing type with a 18 ft (5.5 m) driven rotor under each wing. After a string of all-metal prototypes, McDonnell's 1928 H-45 and H-47 used a thinner, externally braced wing, more powerful engines, had two more seats in a side-windowed cabin and were much more successful.

== Specifications ==
Data from Aero Digest, August 1927

General characteristics

- Crew: 2
- Capacity: 4 passengers (another could sit beside the pilot, in place of the second crew member)
- Length: 31 ft 5 in (9.58 m)
- Wingspan: 48 ft 5 in (14.76 m)
- Height: 8 ft 5 in (2.57 m)
- Wing area: 300 sq ft (28 m^{2})
- Aspect ratio: 7.3
- Airfoil: NACA 81J modified
- Empty weight: 1,860 lb (844 kg)
- Gross weight: 3,800 lb (1,724 kg)
- Fuel capacity: 80 US gal (67 imp gal; 300 L) in the wings
- Powerplant: 1 × Wright J-5 Whirlwind 9-cylinder air-cooled radial piston engine, 220 hp (160 kW) at 2,000 rpm
- Propellers: 2-bladed Hamilton Standard

Performance

- Maximum speed: 120 mph (190 km/h, 100 kn)
- Cruise speed: 100 mph (160 km/h, 87 kn)
- Rate of climb: 750 ft/min (3.8 m/s) initial
- Take-off time: 9 seconds with a load of 1,600 lb (725.7 kg)
- Landing speed: 45 mph (39 kn; 72 km/h)
