= Stout ST =

ST
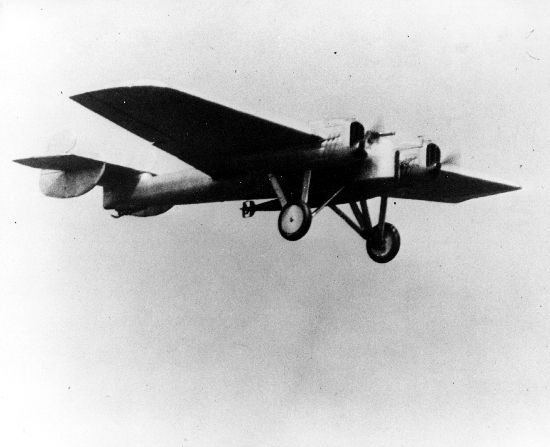
- ST-1

General information
- Type: Torpedo bomber
- National origin: United States
- Manufacturer: Stout Engineering Company
- Designer: William Bushnell Stout, George H. Prudden
- Number built: 1

History
- First flight: April 25, 1922

The Stout ST was a twin-engine torpedo bomber built for the US Navy. It pioneered the American use of metal construction and the cantilever "thick wing" design concepts of German aeronautical engineer Hugo Junkers, themselves pioneered in the second half of 1915.

== Development ==
The US Navy Bureau of Aeronautics had a requirement to review several types of torpedo-carrying aircraft. Prototypes of the Curtiss CT, Stout ST, Fokker FT and Blackburn Swift F were evaluated at the Anacostia Naval Yard. William Bushnell Stout approached the Navy with his all-metal torpedo bomber design. He estimated the aircraft would cost $50,000 each to produce. The aircraft was built in Detroit, Michigan over a two-year period. Navy officials visited the facility frequently to inspect the new metal-forming and construction methods.

== Design ==
The aircraft was a twin engine conventional geared mid-winged monoplane. Its primary feature was its corrugated metal construction, a new technique and different from the tube-and-fabric airplanes of the time. In addition, the internally supported cantilever wing developed for the Stout Batwing was employed. The aircraft was test flown successfully, however, the airplane showed signs of inadequate longitudinal stability.

== Operational history ==
The first flight of the prototype, designated ST-1, was at Selfridge Field with Edward Stinson at the controls. The flight was witnessed by William A. Moffett, chief of Navy Aeronautics. Stinson suggested changes to the aircraft, but none were made. At an acceptance ceremony, a Marine pilot stalled the aircraft and crashed it. The pilot survived, but all orders for the aircraft were canceled by the Navy.

The loss of the aircraft and the Navy contract were financially devastating for Stout, prompting him to start his famous letter-writing campaign to eventually form Stout Engineering Company.

== Variants ==
ST-1
Prototype, one built.

== Specifications Stout ST-1 ==
Data from Aerofiles

General characteristics

- Length: 37 ft (11 m)
- Wingspan: 60 ft (18 m)
- Powerplant: 2 × Packard V-1237 , 400 hp (300 kW) each
- Propellers: 2-bladed

Performance

- Range: 335 nmi (385 mi, 620 km)
