= Batwing =

Batwing may refer to:

== In fiction ==
- Batplane, the Batman vehicle
- Batwing (Marvel Comics), a Marvel Comics character
- Batwing (DC Comics), a DC Comics character

== Roller coasters ==
- Batwing (roller coaster), a roller coaster at Six Flags America
- Batwing (roller coaster element)
- Batwing Spaceshot, a drop tower at Warner Bros. Movie World

== Aviation ==
- Stout Batwing
- Batwings, a precursor to wingsuits

== Other uses ==
- Batwing sleeves, a type of sleeve
- A type of bow tie
- The common name of genus Atrophaneura

== See also ==
- Bat wing, the wing of a bat
