= Stout 2-AT Pullman =

Stout 2 AT Pullman
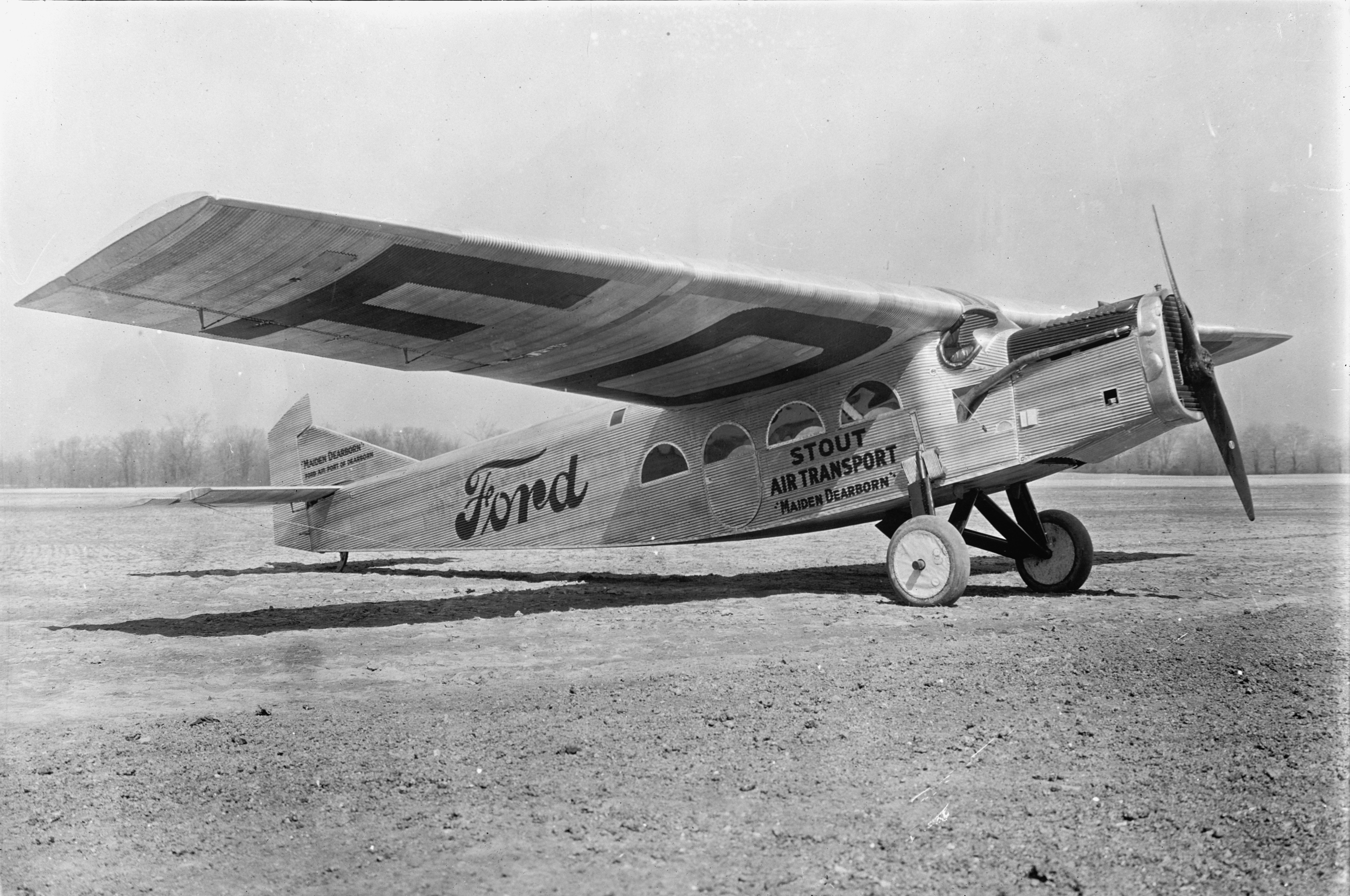
- Stout AT-2 "Maiden Dearborn"

General information
- National origin: United States
- Manufacturer: Stout Engineering Company
- Designer: William Bushnell Stout, George H. Prudden.
- Status: All aircraft scrapped or destroyed.
- Primary user: Airline and Air mail transport
- Number built: 11

History
- Introduction date: 1924
- First flight: April 23, 1924
- Retired: 1928
- Developed from: Stout 1-AS Air Sedan
- Variant: Stout 3-AT

The Stout 2-AT Pullman, or "Air Pullman", was a single engine all-metal monoplane that was used for early airline travel and air mail transport in the United States.

== Development ==
William Bushnell Stout started in aviation working for Packard on the Liberty engine during World War I. He promoted early innovative designs, based on the 1915 innovations of German aviation engineer Hugo Junkers, such as a blended wing concept, and pioneered all-metal aircraft construction in America using Junkers-devised concepts. The 2-AT was a more conventional layout using the familiar and plentiful Liberty engine of the time.

The first use of the nickname "Tin Goose" was applied to this aircraft by the news media. The name was later attributed to the Ford Trimotor.

== Design ==
The 2-AT was a high-wing conventional gear monoplane. The original design featured an open cockpit for the pilots, followed by an enclosed cockpit with opening side windows. The aircraft featured wallpaper, padded seats, semi-circular opening windows, and a bathroom. It was the first all-metal aircraft certified in America. It was eventually redesigned to accommodate three engines, becoming the Stout 3-AT trimotor, and again redesigned to become the more well-known Ford Trimotor. The aircraft was under development as a Stout aircraft when Ford bought all controlling interests, creating the Stout Metal Airplane Division of the Ford Motor Company. Development hastened with the infusion of resources from Ford.

Stout's chief engineer, George H. Prudden, was credited for the new wing design using principles from Stout's earlier "thick wing" aircraft. Each 2-AT was powered by a Liberty engine, one example was tested with a Pratt and Whitney Wasp radial engine.

== Operational history ==
The first flight was performed by Walter Edwin Lees at Selfridge Field. The windshield blew in, locking the controls and forcing a landing on a frozen lake. In 1925 the 2-AT was demonstrated in the Ford National Reliability Air Tour by E. G. Hamilton. While just completing the event would have won an award, the 2-AT completed it with a perfect score. At the 1925 Air Tour, the first 2-AT sale was announced. It was sold to John Wanamaker & Co. to haul passengers and freight between Philadelphia, Pennsylvania, and New York City. Wanamaker's was an early seller of Ford products, and in turn became the first reseller of Ford aircraft, displaying their 2-AT in their New York City showroom. The 2-AT was listed in their lineup for $25,000.

The United States Post Office Department ordered one 2-AT for airmail service. The aircraft was modified with a 500 hp (373 kW) Packard engine.

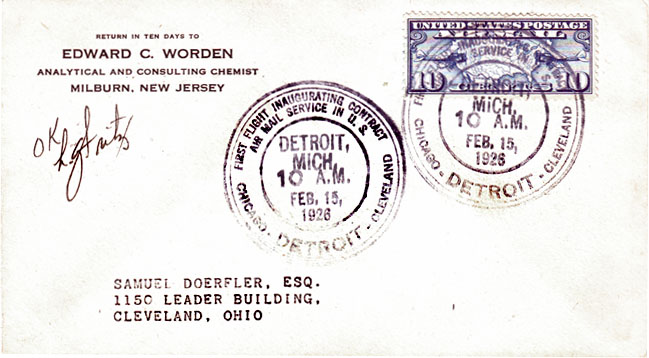
Letter from first CAM flight in a 2-AT

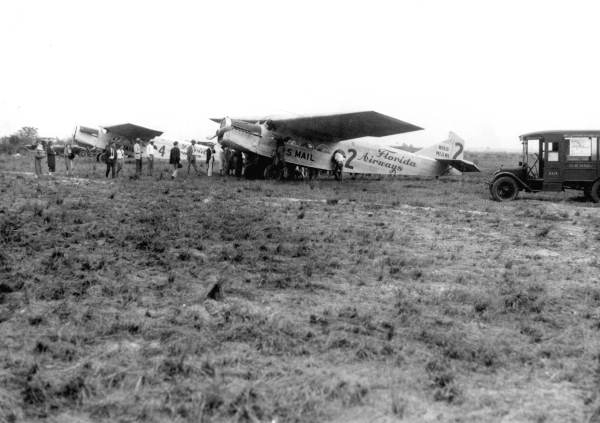
Florida Airways Stout 2-ATs. (State Library and Archives of Florida)

The aircraft were put into service with the newly formed Ford Air Transport Service in 1925. The first 2-AT was built at the Stout factory in Dearborn, Michigan, and named the Maiden Detroit. The aircraft was outfitted with a nickel-plated Liberty engine bought from a trophy case at the Marmon assembly plant. The other aircraft in the fleet were also 2-ATs, named Maiden Dearborn I, Maiden Dearborn II, Maiden Dearborn III and Maiden Dearborn IV. Initially the aircraft were for Ford's company use. The first scheduled commercial flights in the United States began when the Maiden Detroit flew 1,000 pounds (454 kg) of freight between factories in Detroit, Michigan, and Chicago, Illinois, on April 14, 1925. Ford Air Transport served routes between Chicago, Detroit, and Cleveland, Ohio.

The Maiden Detroit entered contract air mail service on February 15, 1926. The aircraft flew from Detroit to Cleveland, making the first commercial transport of air mail. The U.S. Post Office Department Transcontinental Airway System routes used were CAM-6 (Detroit to Cleveland) and CAM-7 (Detroit to Chicago).

Henry Ford gave three 2-ATs to Florida Airways in exchange for a financial stake in the airline. Florida Airways purchased a fourth 2-AT. One was used on Transcontinental Airway System route CAM-10 (Atlanta, Georgia, to Jacksonville, Florida).

On May 18, 1926, at Argo, Illinois, the Ford Air Transport 2-AT Maiden Dearborn I was involved in the first fatal accident for a commercial U.S. aircraft when its contract air mail pilot flight into poor weather conditions, crashed, and was killed.

In 1928, the United States Department of Commerce's Aeronautics Branch (the predecessor of the Federal Aviation Administration) declared the 2-AT's wings to be structurally unsafe. All remaining 2-ATs were withdrawn from service and scrapped.

== Variants ==
- Stout 3-AT - A trimotor 2-AT powered with Wright J-4 engines.

== Specifications Stout 2-AT Pullman ==
Data from Aerofiles

General characteristics

- Crew: 1
- Capacity: 9
- Length: 45 ft 8 in (13.92 m)
- Wingspan: 58 ft 4 in (17.78 m)
- Height: 11 ft 10 in (3.61 m)
- Wing area: 600 sq ft (56 m^{2})
- Empty weight: 3,638 lb (1,650 kg)
- Gross weight: 6,017 lb (2,729 kg)
- Powerplant: 1 × Liberty V12 , 400 hp (300 kW)

Performance

- Maximum speed: 100 kn (120 mph, 190 km/h)
- Cruise speed: 87 kn (100 mph, 160 km/h)
- Endurance: 4 hr
- Service ceiling: 12,000 ft (3,700 m)
- Rate of climb: 500 ft/min (2.5 m/s)

== See also ==
Aircraft of comparable role, configuration, and era

- Focke-Wulf A 17
- Fokker F.XIV
- Kalinin K-5
- Latécoère 28
- Messerschmitt M 18
- Nieuport-Delage NiD 540
