= Brossy =

Brossy is a surname. Notable people with the surname include:

- Frederic Brossy (1902–1974), American aviator
- René Brossy (1907–1991), French cyclist
