= Stout 3-AT =

American Trimotor Aircraft

General information
- Type: Commercial airliner and Air Mail freight aircraft
- National origin: United States
- Manufacturer: Stout Metal Airplane Division of the Ford Motor Company
- Designer: William Bushnell Stout, George Prudden, Harold Hicks, Thomas Towle, Otto Koppen, John Lee, and James Smith McDonnell
- Number built: 1

History
- First flight: 1926
- Developed from: Stout 2-AT

The Stout 3-AT trimotor was the first all-metal trimotor built in America. The poorly performing tri-motor led to an updated design which became the popular Ford Tri-Motor.

== Development ==
As a friend of the Ford family, Richard Evelyn Byrd visited Dearborn in 1925 with the polar exploration aircraft. The wood and steel tube Fokker F.VIIA-3m named the "Josephine Ford" and owned by Henry Ford's son Edsel (and named for Edsel's daughter). The airplane was received as a gift from his father after being placed first in the 1925 Ford Reliability Tour, and lent to Richard E Byrd for his trip to the North Pole, which was sponsored by Ford. This airplane was the prototype for the Fokker F-VIIA-3m and was based at Ford Airfield (now the Ford Test Track in Dearborn, Michigan) and Stout's factory location. Several measurements and photos were taken during its stay. Shortly afterward, partly using the single-engined, all-metal Stout 2-AT Pullman as a starting point, the model 3-AT trimotor was produced using an all-metal construction technique. Many similarities exist between the designs that caused controversy. Also, enough differences in technologies were made between the aircraft that the 3-AT can be seen as a unique design, as well.

== Design ==
The 3-AT trimotor had a blunt nose, with its central radial engine mounted close to the nose's bottom, and two wing-mounted outboard, uncowled radial engines, projecting forward of the wings' leading edges at the front of each of a pair of nacelles. The aircraft had a large passenger and cargo compartment with semicircular windows and a large, forward-looking glassed-in window section. The pilot sat in an open cockpit mounted high on the nose of the aircraft. The original design featured three Liberty engines, but they were quickly abandoned due to weight issues.

== Operational history ==
The Model 3-AT trimotor was heavily promoted by Henry Ford as the airplane of the future. Test flights proved otherwise, with the underpowered aircraft barely able to maintain altitude. Test pilot Rudolph William "Shorty" Schroeder could barely circle the field and refused to take off in the plane again. He advised Ford, "Forget the plane." After witnessing the tests, Henry Ford left outraged. Ford told Mayo, "This plane is a mechanical monstrosity and an aerodynamic absurdity. From now on keep Stout out of the design room." Shortly afterward, Ford reassigned Stout away from engineering.

On January 16, 1926, a fire destroyed the Stout factory and all aircraft in it, including several 2-ATs and the 3-AT prototype. In a 1951 interview, engineer Harold Hicks said that the fire and a fresh start were the best thing that happened to Ford's aviation venture. The 3-AT was impractical with its uncowled engines mounted in the wing roots, disturbing the airflow over the wing, giving it an 80-mph takeoff and landing speed.

Tom Towle was placed in charge of engineering, and hired MIT graduate Otto C. Koppen, John Lee, and James Smith McDonnell (co-founder of McDonnell Douglas). Together, they refined the 3-AT into what is now recognizable as the "Tin Goose", the Ford Trimotor.

== Variants ==
For the Ford 4AT, the basic 3AT design was used, with the main engines placed in underwing, strut-mounted nacelles, and the cockpit moved internally.

== Specifications Stout 3-AT Trimotor ==
Data from Wind and Beyond: A Documentary Journey Into the History of Aerodynamics

General characteristics

- Crew: 1
- Powerplant: 3 × Wright J-4 Whirlwind 9-cyl air-cooled radial piston engines, 200 hp (150 kW) each

Performance

- Cruise speed: 110 mph (180 km/h, 96 kn)
- Minimum control speed: 80 mph (130 km/h, 70 kn)
