= Stout Batwing Limousine =

Single-engine, high-wing cantilever aircraft

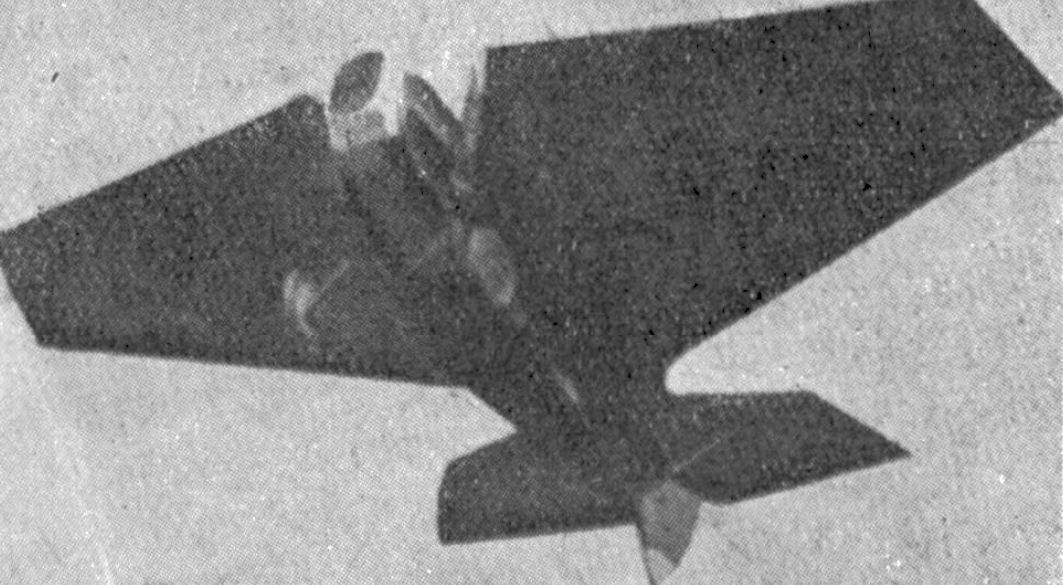

General information
- Type: Single-engine monoplane
- National origin: United States
- Manufacturer: Stout Engineering Company
- Designer: William Bushnell Stout

History
- First flight: 1920

The Stout Batwing Limousine was a single-engine, high-wing cantilever aircraft. It was also called simply the "Commercial Sedan".

== Development ==
William Bushnell Stout developed the Stout Batwing, a cantilever blended-wing aircraft with the engine mounted internally. The pioneer aircraft in cantilever wings suffered from poor visibility with its top-mounted open cockpit. The follow-on aircraft, the Stout Batwing Limousine, would have a conventional fuselage and engine arrangement, and a tail mounted further aft. The all-wood cantilever wing did not need struts or braces, reducing parasitic drag on the aircraft. The pilot had side windows and a wing cut-out for forward vision.

Stout acquired financing for the project from Robert Stranahan of the Champion Spark Plug Company. Production started in Detroit, Michigan.

== Design ==
The conventional geared aircraft is all-wood, with veneer wood skins. The propeller was mounted through a forward radiator. The exhaust header stack turned upward, projecting above the top of the fuselage. The fuel tanks are wing mounted. The wing has a chord that spans most of the length of the fuselage.

== Operational history ==
The first aircraft was flown with an airfoil designed for speed rather than lift. Test pilot Bert Acosta said the aircraft did not have enough lift and visibility. Bert did claim the plane was stable enough to fly with his hands off the controls for several minutes at a time. A second wing with more camber produced favorable results. The aircraft had an alarming "hunting" tendency when gliding that was fixed after 30–40 test flights. Stout mentioned in 1922 that his next example would be built out of metal.

This aircraft was the first in a series by Stout that would later form the Stout Metal Airplane Division of the Ford Motor Company, building the Ford Trimotor.

== Specifications Stout Batwing Limousine ==
General characteristics

- Capacity: 3
- Wingspan: 36 ft (11 m)
- Empty weight: 1,825 lb (828 kg)
- Powerplant: 1 × Packard Eight-cylinder, 200 hp (150 kW)

Performance

- Maximum speed: 109 kn (125 mph, 201 km/h)
- Cruise speed: 97 kn (112 mph, 180 km/h)
- Stall speed: 39 kn (45 mph, 72 km/h)
- Rate of climb: 480 ft/min (2.4 m/s)
