= Ford Air Transport Service =

- Founded: 1925; 101 years ago
- Commenced operations: 1925; 101 years ago
- Ceased operations: 1932; 94 years ago
- Hubs: Detroit, Michigan
- Fleet size: 5
- Destinations: 3
- Parent company: Ford Motor Company
- Headquarters: Detroit, Michigan
- Key people: Henry Ford, Edsel Ford

Ford Air Transport Service is a defunct airline based in United States of America. The airline was also registered as Ford Air Freight Lines.

== History ==
Henry Ford initiated Ford Air Transport Service—the world's first regularly scheduled commercial cargo airline—in 1925.

Ford Air Transport Service started with Stout 2-AT Pullman aircraft in 1925. Henry and Edsel Ford had an investment in Stout Engineering that became the Stout Metal Airplane Division of the Ford Motor Company later that year in August. The first 2-AT was built at the Stout factory in Dearborn and called the "Maiden Detroit". The other aircraft in the fleet were also 2-AT's, named "Maiden Dearborn I, II, III and IV". Initially the aircraft were for Ford's company use. The airline's first scheduled commercial flights in America were begun when the "Maiden Dearborn" flew 1,000 lbs. of freight between factories in Detroit and Chicago on April 13, 1925. Ford Air Transport served routes between Chicago, Detroit and Cleveland. The airline logged over 1000 scheduled flights in its first year.

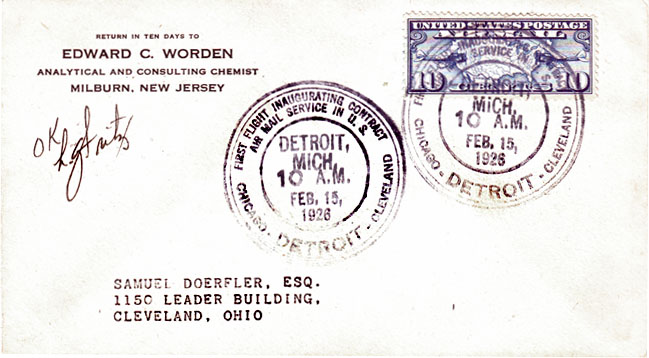
Letter from first CAM flight in a 2-AT

The aircraft operated out of Ford Airport off of two grass runways with night lighting.

The safety and predictability of the first cargo flights were used to advantage in securing the first airmail contracts under the Kelly Act. The "Madien Detroit" entered Contract Air Mail service on February 15, 1926 with Henry and Edsel Ford loading the first bag of mail. The aircraft flew from Detroit to Cleveland under fighter escort to become the first commercial transport of air mail. L.G. "Larry" Fritz piloted the aircraft with Ford and Stout as passengers for the one-hour-seventeen-minute flight. The routes would be known as CAM-6 (Detroit to Cleveland), and CAM-7 (Detroit to Chicago).

In 1928 Ford sold the airmail routes to Stout who also was operating his own airline with Stout-Ford built aircraft. The last official flight was in 1932.

Most of the 2-AT's eventually were sold to Florida Airways, the forerunner of Eastern Airlines.

== Destinations ==
- Detroit, Michigan (Ford Airport (Dearborn))
- Chicago, Illinois (Airport)
- Cleveland, Ohio (Airport)

== Fleet ==
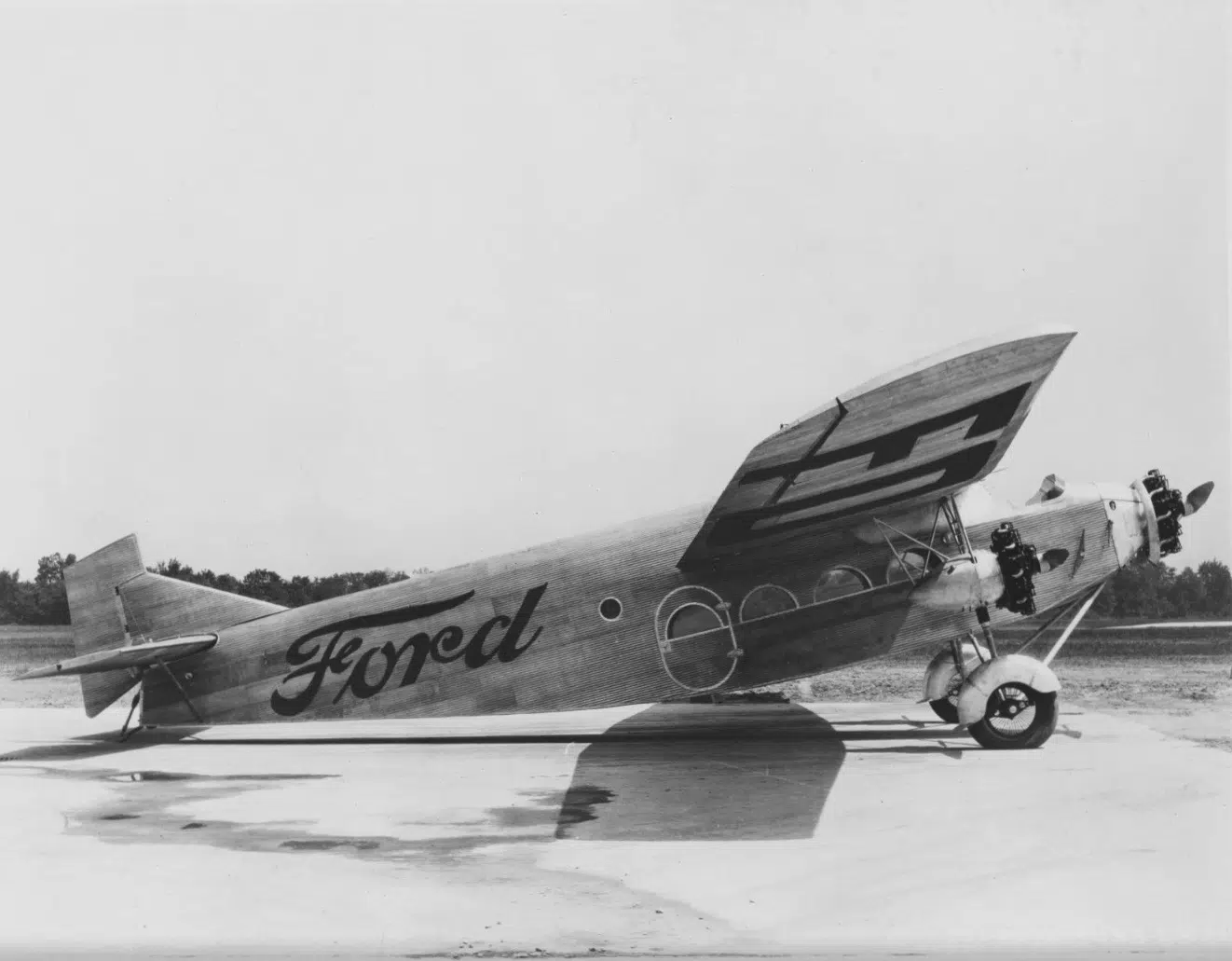
Ford Tri-Motor 4-AT-01, photographed at Ford Airport, Dearborn, Michigan, 5 June 1926.

The Ford Air Transport Service fleet consists of the following aircraft:

Ford Air Transport Service Airlines Fleet
Aircraft	Total	Routes	Notes
Stout 2-AT Pullman	5	Detroit-Chicago, Detroit-Cleveland
4-AT-01	1		Crashed May 12, 1928

== Accidents and incidents ==
- On May 18, 1926, in Argo, Illinois, a Ford Air Transport 2-AT Maiden Deaborn I was involved in the first fatal accident for a commercial U.S. aircraft. The Contract Air Mail pilot crashed and was killed due to flight into poor weather conditions.
- On May 12, 1928, a Ford Air Freight 4-AT-01, NC 1492 crashed on takeoff from Dearborn Michigan killing the only two passengers on board the aircraft.
