= Nancy Hopkins (aviator) =

American aviator

- Nancy Hopkins (1909–1997) at the 1930 National Air Tour
- Born: 16 May 1909
- Died: January 15, 1997 (aged 87)
- Occupation: Aviator
- Known for: President of International Women's Air and Space Museum

Nancy Hopkins Tier (May 16, 1909 – January 15, 1997) was an American aviator. She was the president of the International Women's Air and Space Museum and a member of United Flying Octogenarians.

== Early life ==
She was born as Nancy Hopkins on May 16, 1909 in Washington, D.C. Her father was Alfred Francis Hopkins I (1879–1955) who was born in Wayne, Pennsylvania and worked as an antique salesman. Alfred was said to be related to the Hopkins family that started Johns Hopkins University; Alfred's father was from Maryland, and his mother from Maine. Nancy's mother was Anne DeWolf Gibson (1877–1963). Nancy had a brother, Alfred Francis Hopkins II (1914–1988), an illustrator, and two sisters, Frances and Betty. She was a niece of Lady Nancy Astor and her uncle, Charles Dana Gibson (1867–1944), was the creator of the Gibson Girl.

== Career ==
In November 1927 she had her first flight from Hoover Field in Arlington, Virginia, and in 1929 she received limited commercial license #5889 at Roosevelt Field in New York. In 1930 she listed her occupation as "aviation air pilot". That same year her father was working as an "antique salesman" and her mother was not listed as living in the household.

In 1930, she entered the Women's Dixie Derby, 2,000 mile air race from Washington, District of Columbia to Chicago, Illinois. She flew her Viking Kitty Hawk B4 biplane, NC30V. That same year she was one of four women in the 5,000-mile Ford National Reliability Air Tour, and the only woman pilot.

On a ride during the winter of 1931 her plane was in a flat spin and would have crashed. She climbed out of the cockpit preparing to parachute but her weight on the wing tilted the aircraft enough to take her out of the spin. She climbed back into the cockpit and regained control at 200 feet. This got her a job at Viking as a spokeswoman. In 1931 she also received her transport license.

She participated in several air races including:

- 1930 Ford Reliability Tour
- 1930 Women's Dixie Derby
- 1932 Meridien Aviation Pylon Race
- 1971 New England Air Race

Hopkins joined the Connecticut Civil Air Patrol in 1942 and rose to the rank of Colonel.

== Personal life ==
She married Irving Vanderroest Tier (1902–1978) on February 24, 1931 in Connecticut.

Hopkins died in Sharon, Connecticut on January 15, 1997.

== Timeline ==
- 1909 Birth
- 1927 First flight from Hoover Field in Arlington, Virginia
- 1929 Limited commercial license #5889 at Roosevelt Field, New York
- 1929 Charter member of Ninety-Nines
- 1930 Ford National Reliability Air Tour
- 1930 Women's Dixie Derby
- 1931 Transport license
- 1931 Marriage
- 1931 Plane in a spin
- 1931 Connecticut Speed Champion
- 1932 Meridien Aviation Pylon Race
- 1933 Flew coast to coast
- 1942 Civil Air Patrol
- 1963 Flew the first day covers for the Amelia Earhart stamp from Atchison to New York City
- 1971 New England Air Race
- 1976 C.W. Post University award
- 1983 Wings Club award
- 1986 President of the International Women's Air and Space Museum
- 1992 Pioneer Women in Aviation Hall of Fame
- 1992 (circa) Honorary member of US Air Force's 38th Strategic Missile Wing
- 1994 resigns as president of the International Women's Air and Space Museum
- 1997 Death
