= George H. Prudden =

American aircraft engineer

George Henry Prudden, Jr.
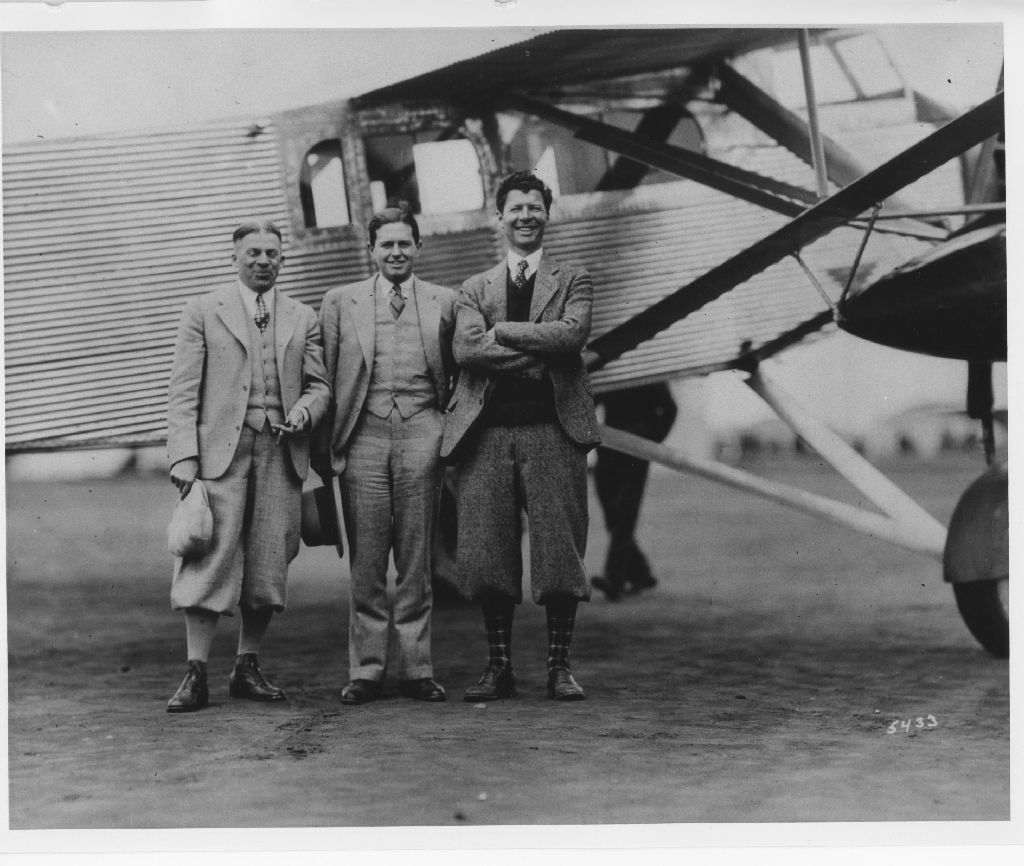
- Ryan corp. group photo, left to right A.j. Edwards, F.W. Hemingway, George H. Prudden, standing in front of the Prudden TM-1 tri-motor airliner.
- Born: February 18, 1893; Minnesota
- Died: January 20, 1964 (aged 70); Hoag Hospital (California); Newport Beach, California
- Education: University of Minnesota
- Occupation: Aircraft Engineer
- Partner: Nancy Prudden
- Children: Terry Prudden
- Parent: George Prudden

George Henry Prudden, Jr. (February 18, 1893 – January 20, 1964) was an American aircraft engineer. He was instrumental in designing the first all metal aircraft in America. He was president of the Early Birds of Aviation in 1961.

== Early life ==
Born on 18 February 1893, George, and his brother Earl, were interested in aviation from an early age, being featured in the St. Louis Post-Dispatch with an airplane model of his design in 1909. By 24 June 1910, Prudden had soloed a plane of his own design based on the Wright Flyer.

Despite his flying experience, George Prudden served in the 74th Field Artillery during World War I. After military service Prudden returned to education graduating in the Class of 1920 from the University of Minnesota. George was then recruited by William Bushnell Stout, to help develop the Stout ST-1 all metal torpedo bomber for the U.S. Navy. George later designed the Stout 2-AT Pullman, the first aircraft to make regularly scheduled airline flights, cargo flights, and commercial air mail flights. Henry Ford fully purchased the Stout company in 1925, making it the Stout Metal Airplane Division of the Ford Motor Company. One of Prudden's first tasks was to investigate the breakup of the USS Shenandoah on behalf of Ford. Ford was very displeased when he saw that the effort was publicised in the Detroit Free Press and cut Prudden.

In 1927, Prudden founded the Prudden-San Diego Airplane Company, to manufacture an all-metal trimotor with Ryan supplied engines. In November 1928, Prudden left the company at the height of the depression and the company was renamed to the Solar Aircraft Company. The company Prudden founded is still active as Solar Turbines Incorporated, a wholly owned subsidiary of Caterpillar Inc.

Later, Prudden developed the Prudden-Whitehead monoplane with the Atlanta Aircraft Corporation. While in Atlanta, Prudden helped develop Candler Field, Atlanta.

In 1932, Prudden worked for Lockheed Aircraft where he helped engineer the Lockheed Vega and Lockheed Orion aircraft.

In World War II, Prudden managed the Ryan Aeronautical factory in San Diego, California.

In 1961, Prudden became the President of the Early birds of Aviation.

He died on January 20, 1964.

== Legacy ==
Many of Prudden's awards were displayed in the San Diego Air & Space Museum, but were destroyed in a 1978 arson fire.
