= Ford Model 15-P =

General information
- Type: Light Aircraft
- National origin: United States
- Manufacturer: Stout Metal Airplane Division of the Ford Motor Company
- Status: Not produced
- Number built: 1

History
- First flight: 1935

The Ford Model 15-P flying wing was the last aircraft developed by the Stout Metal Airplane Division of the Ford Motor Company. After several flights resulting in a crash, the program was halted. Ford eventually re-entered the aviation market producing Consolidated B-24 Liberators under license from Consolidated Aircraft.

== Development ==
A press release in Jan 1936 said that Ford was designing behind closed doors a new "flivver" using its new V-8 engine.

== Design ==
The Model 15-P was a two-passenger "flying wing" or tailless design. It featured a rear-mounted Ford V-8 driving a tractor propeller with a driveshaft The fuselage was steel tube with an aluminum covering and the wings were fabric-covered. The landing gear was fully faired with large landing lights mounted in the fairings.

== Operational history ==
Several test flights were made by test pilot Harry Russell, but after an accident the aircraft was put in storage. The aircraft was licensed by the Federal Bureau of Air Commerce in 1936, the same year Ford closed its aircraft division. The remains of the 15P were used to create a prototype autogyro, but all trace of the 15P disappeared when the autogyro was scrapped.

== Specifications ==
Data from Michigan Aircraft Manufacturers By Robert F. Pauley

General characteristics

- Capacity: 2
- Length: 14 ft (4.3 m)
- Wingspan: 34 ft (10 m)
- Powerplant: 1 × Ford V-8, 115 hp (86 kW)

Performance

- Range: 430 nmi (500 mi, 800 km)

== See also ==
Aircraft of comparable role, configuration, and era

- Dyke Delta
