= Ford 14-A =

1930s American airliner prototype

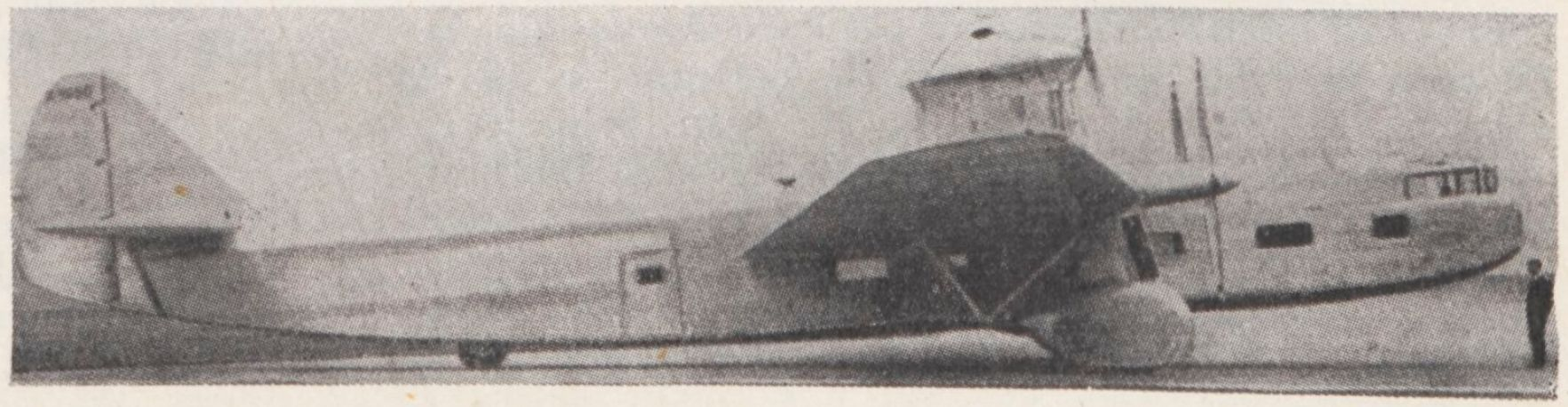
- The Ford 14-A with wheels retracted

General information
- Type: airliner
- National origin: U.S.
- Manufacturer: The Airplane Division of the Ford Motor Company

History
- Introduction date: 1932

The Ford 14-A was a prototype three-engined, large, streamlined, 32 passenger aircraft built in 1932. Though apparently completed, it never flew.

== Design and development ==
The 14-A had only weak links with Ford's earlier, smaller Trimotor series, with a wingspan 50% greater, more powerful and differently mounted engines and nearly three times as many passengers in a much more spacious fuselage.

It was an all-metal aircraft with a thick (4 ft 3 in (1.30 m) maximum), two spar shoulder wing. Each sub-wing, themselves in two parts, was mounted on a short, rectangular plan centre-section which was an integral part of the fuselage. Beyond this, the wings had tetrahedral plans out to rounded tips. Its ailerons filled the outermost panels and, like the other control surfaces, were dynamically, though not aerodynamically, balanced.

The fuselage structure was of the open channel truss type with steel members in the central part carrying wing, engine and undercarriage stresses and with dural elsewhere. It was covered in corrugated Alclad sheet. The two pilots were given an excellent view from their enclosed position in the extreme nose, having entered through an external, port side door into the smoking room, then forward through an internal door. There were four passenger compartments, modelled after those used by railway passengers but divided into sub-compartments by a central corridor from the smoking room rear door. Each sub-compartment accommodated four passengers on double, face-to-face seats lit by a large window and was provided with sound insulation and heating. The two forward compartments were separated from the two aft by toilets under the wing. Further aft the corridor passed the galley on the port side and a starboard side baggage store, each with its own external door, on the way to the exit/entry area which had doors on each side. Overall the passenger cabin, excluding the toilets, was 41 ft (12 m) long, 8 ft 11 in (2.72 m) wide and 6 ft 10 in (2.08 m) high, a volume of 1,948 cu ft (55.2 m^{3}).

The 14-A was unusual in having two different, though closely related, types of engines, very differently mounted. Ford had considered replacing the standard tri-motor nose engine by one on a pylon in the unbuilt Ford 12-A and the 14-A's central, 1,100 hp (820 kW) Hispano-Suiza 18Sb water-cooled W-18 was pylon-mounted, with each of its three well-separated cylinder banks individually cowled. It was cooled by edge-on radiators in the pylon and drove a three-bladed propeller. The outer engines, two Hispano-Suiza 12Nbr, water-cooled 60° V-12s, were buried in the thick wings. Geared down, they drove larger, four-bladed propellers on long drive shafts. Their edge-on radiators were mounted within the carefully faired landing legs underneath them.

The 14-A's landing gear was also unusual: though the landing legs and the deep wheel fairings were fixed and braced with near-horizontal struts to the lower fuselage members, the wheels themselves could be retracted into their fairings. When the aircraft was stationary the wheels were retracted but before take-off they were lowered pneumatically, increasing the 14-A's height by 4 ft 1 in (1.24 m), then raised again in-flight. Their track was 26 ft 5 in (8.05 m). The tail wheel was unusually large and well ahead of the tail, helping to level the fuselage on the ground. Like the main wheels it was mounted on a shock absorber but, additionally, was free to caster.

The tail unit was conventional, with a tapered tailplane mounted on top of the fuselage and braced to it from below and the fin was triangular. Its rudder was rounded and deep, requiring a cut-out in the elevator for movement.

== Operational history ==
Though photos and a detailed description published in April 1932 appear to suggest it was complete, there is no record of it flying. Despite the effort put into its construction, the aircraft was cut up in 1933.

== Specifications ==
Data from Aero Digest (April 1932)

General characteristics

- Capacity: 32 passengers in Pullman style sections
- Length: 80 ft 10 in (24.64 m)
- Wingspan: 110 ft (34 m)
- Height: 23 ft 7 in (7.19 m) wheels down
- Wing area: 1,600 sq ft (150 m^{2})
- Powerplant: 1 × Hispano-Suiza 18Sb water-cooled W-18 mounted centrally, direct drive, 1,100 hp (820 kW)
- Powerplant: 2 × Hispano-Suiza 12Nbr water-cooled V-12, wing mounted, geared down 2:1, 715 hp (533 kW) each
- Propellers: 3-bladed on central engine, diameter 10 ft 2 in (3.10 m), 4-bladed on outer pair, diameters 12 ft 10 in (3.91 m)
