= Frederic Brossy =

American test pilot (1902–1974)

Frederic Albert Brossy (March 25, 1902 – February 20, 1974) set the flight endurance record with Walter Edwin Lees on May 28, 1931.

== Biography ==
He was born in 1902 to Francis E. Brossy. In 1931, he was an ensign in reserve squadron VN-9RD9 at the Naval Reserve Aviation Base in Grosse Ile, Michigan. Walter Edwin Lees was a lieutenant in the same squadron. Both men were on inactive duty and were working as test pilots for Packard when they set the flight endurance record on May 28, 1931. Brossy later went on active duty and became a flight instructor at Long Beach Airport in Long Beach, California, in the late 1930s. He married Betty Higman (1904–1975), and he died in Santa Barbara, California, in 1974.
