= William Benson Mayo =

American engineer (1866–1944)

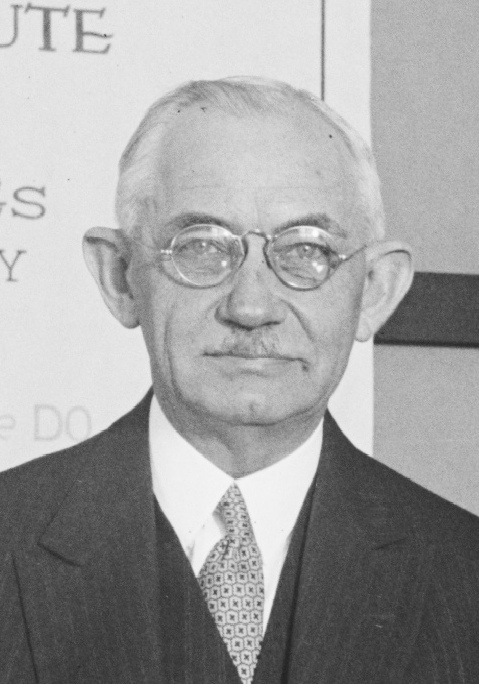
- Mayo in 1930
- Born: January 7, 1866; Chatham, Massachusetts, U.S.
- Died: February 1, 1944 (aged 78); Detroit, Michigan, U.S.
- Employer(s): Ford Motor Company; Detroit Aircraft Corporation

William Benson Mayo (January 7, 1866 – February 1, 1944) was chief power engineer for the Ford Motor Company.

== Biography ==
Mayo was born in Chatham, Massachusetts, on January 7, 1866 to Andrew Mayo and Amanda Mayo. He worked initially as a sign painter in Boston and later accepted a position as an office boy for steam engine manufacturer Hooven-Owens-Rentschler in Hamilton, Ohio. He became a salesman in the Boston office, then was promoted to New York. In 1906 he moved to the corporate office in Hamilton, Ohio as a vice-president, handling the largest sales accounts.

In 1913 the company was approached by Ford to provide power generation equipment for Ford's Highland Park, Michigan complex. Mayo became acquainted with Henry Ford, who hired him to become the chief power engineer. In 1917 Mayo was given primary responsibility for planning and construction of the River Rouge Plant complex. Subsequently, he was responsible for the construction of other Ford plants, using hydroelectric power at Green Island, New York and St. Paul, Minnesota. The Ford Dam continues to generate hydroelectric power for St. Paul to this day.

In 1919, when Edsel Ford became president of Ford, Mayo became his consultant and adviser. In 1926 he became head of Ford's Aircraft Division, which developed and built the Ford Trimotor; he was also responsible for the construction of Ford's private airport (now the location of a Ford test track) and the first airport hotel (now the Dearborn Inn).

Mayo also served as a director of the Detroit Aircraft Corporation which went into receivership in 1931 during the Great Depression.

He retired in August 1932. In retirement, he served as an officer of several transportation companies. He died in Detroit on February 1, 1944.
