= Harry J. Brooks =

American test pilot (1902–1928)

- Harry Brooks c. 1928
- Born: Harry Joseph Brooks; December 2, 1902; Southfield, Michigan, U.S.
- Died: February 25, 1928 (aged 25); Melbourne, Florida, U.S.
- Cause of death: Aircraft crash
- Occupation: Test pilot

Harry Joseph Brooks (December 2, 1902 – February 25, 1928) was an American test pilot. His crash of the Ford Flivver for the Stout Metal Airplane Division of the Ford Motor Company in 1928 was cited with the Great Depression as a factor in Henry Ford's exit from the aviation business.

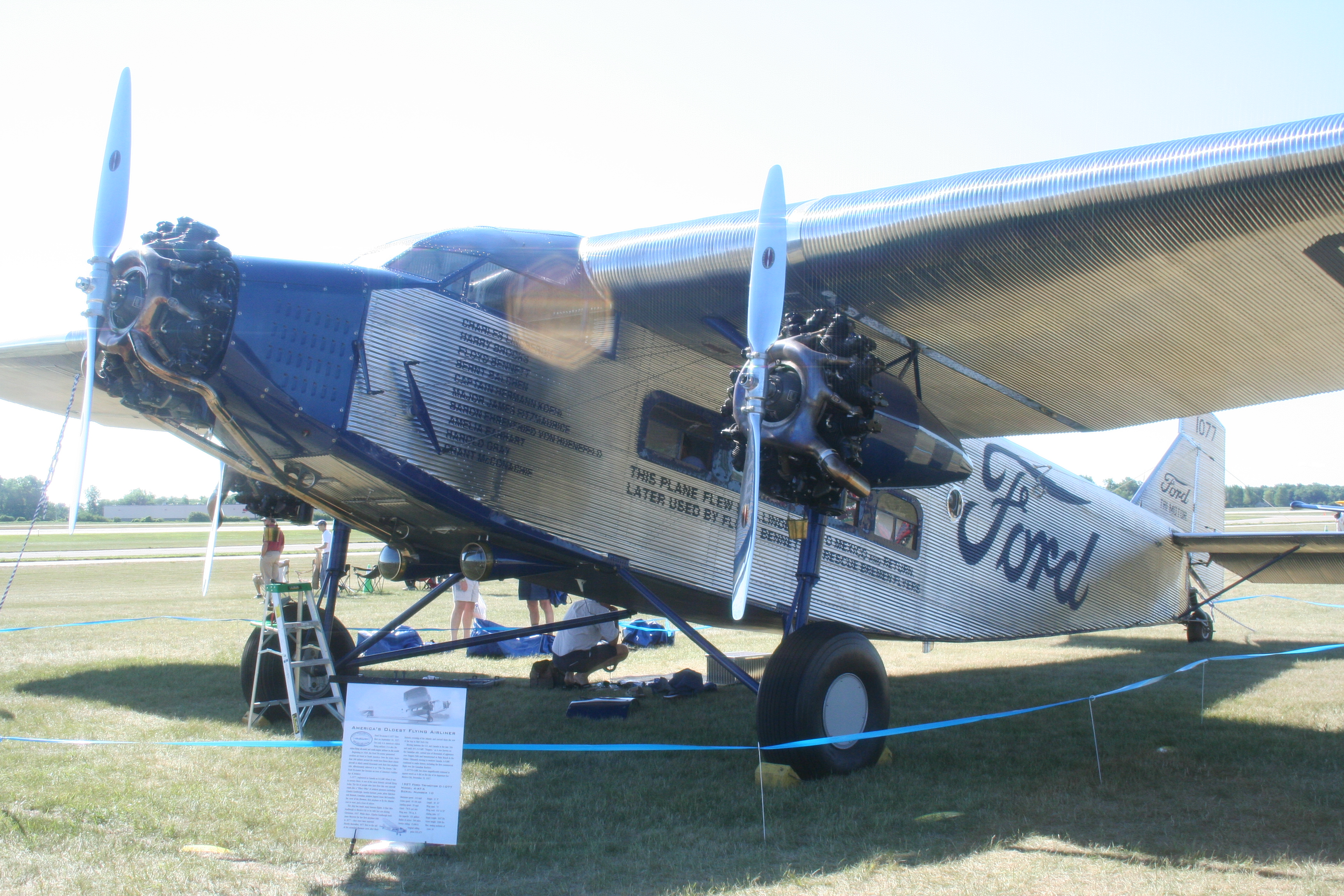
Brooks piloted the Ford 4AT Trimotor.

== Early life ==
Brooks grew up in Southfield, Michigan, and became interested in aviation at an early age. At age nine, he saw the Wright brothers and one of their aircraft at a state fair. Brooks began pursuing his interest in aviation, taking flying lessons at a local airstrip, where he was observed on several occasions by Henry Ford. His father played the violin at dances at a local inn and met Ford. The elder Brooks invited Ford home for dinner and introduced him to his son.

Ford hired Harry to work in one of his auto plants. Several months later, Ford gave Harry a job as a test pilot for the Stout Metal Airplane Division of the Ford Motor Company. Although still very young, Brooks soon became Ford’s top pilot, as well as a close friend whom Ford nicknamed "Brooksie". Brooks demonstrated the capabilities of the new monoplane Ford Trimotor to biplane maker William Boeing by handing him the controls and sitting back in the passenger cabin. For the first night flight of a Ford Trimotor, Brooks flew Charles Lindbergh's mother from Detroit to Cleveland. Brooks was also the pilot that flew Lindbergh's mother to Mexico, alongside the Spirit of St. Louis in their 1927 publicity trips. On February 10, 1927, Brooks flew the first aircraft guided solely by a radio-beacon system.

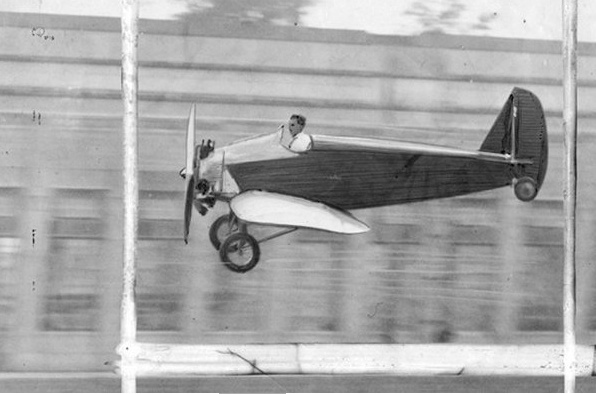
Harry Brooks piloting the first Ford Flivver, c. 1927

== Ford Flivver ==
When Ford released the new Ford Flivver in 1926, Brooks used the prototype to fly to his home just north of Ford Airport.

A third prototype, tail number 3218, with "long" wings was built to win a long-distance record for light planes in the 200 to 400 kg (441 to 882 lb) "C" class. (Note: The Ford Flivver would compete in the FAI C-1a/0 class, i.e., piston-engined aircraft of less than 300 kg (661 lb).) The race was set from Ford Airport in Dearborn, Michigan, to Miami, Florida. A first attempt, launched on January 24, 1928, witnessed by Henry Ford, landed short in Asheville, North Carolina. In a second attempt, flying the second prototype, witnessed by Edsel Ford, Brooks launched from Detroit on February 21, 1928, but landed 200 miles (322 km) short in Titusville, Florida, where the propeller was bent, but still achieved a distance record of 972 mi (1,564 km)

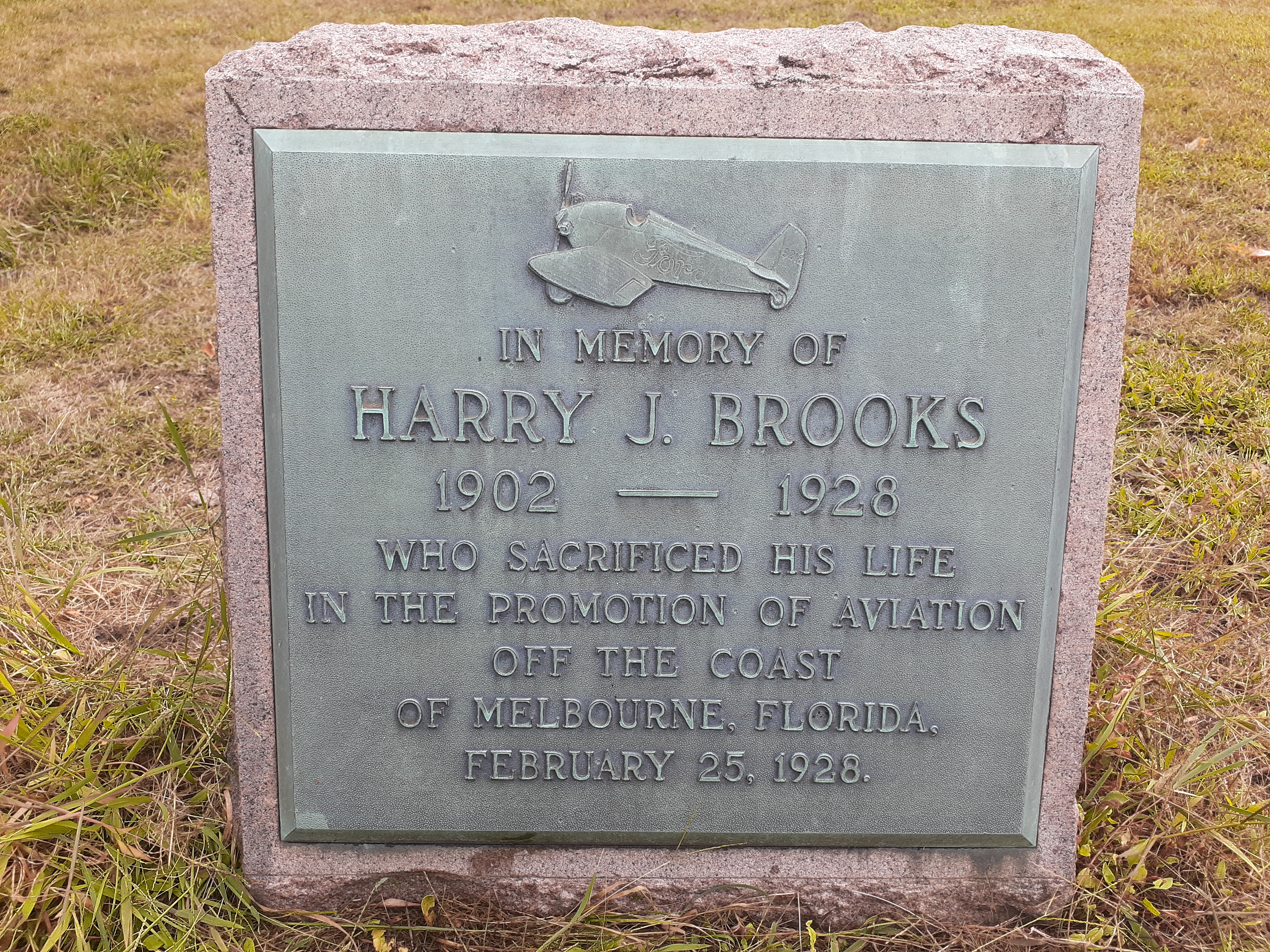
Memorial for Harry J Brooks in Southfield Cemetery in Southfield, Michigan.

During his overnight stay at Titusville, Brooks repaired the aircraft using a propeller from the forced landing. He also placed wooden toothpicks in the vent holes of the fuel cap to prevent moist air from entering and condensing overnight. On February 25, 1928, Brooks took off to complete the race and circled out over the Atlantic Ocean, where his motor quit, and he crashed into the sea and was killed off Melbourne, Florida. The wreckage of the Ford Flivver washed up, but Brooks' body was never found. Investigation of the wreckage disclosed that the toothpicks had plugged the fuel cap vent holes, causing an engine stoppage.

Brooks was slated to be a pilot for Richard Evelyn Byrd's expeditions.
