= Stout Metal Airplane =

American aircraft manufacturer

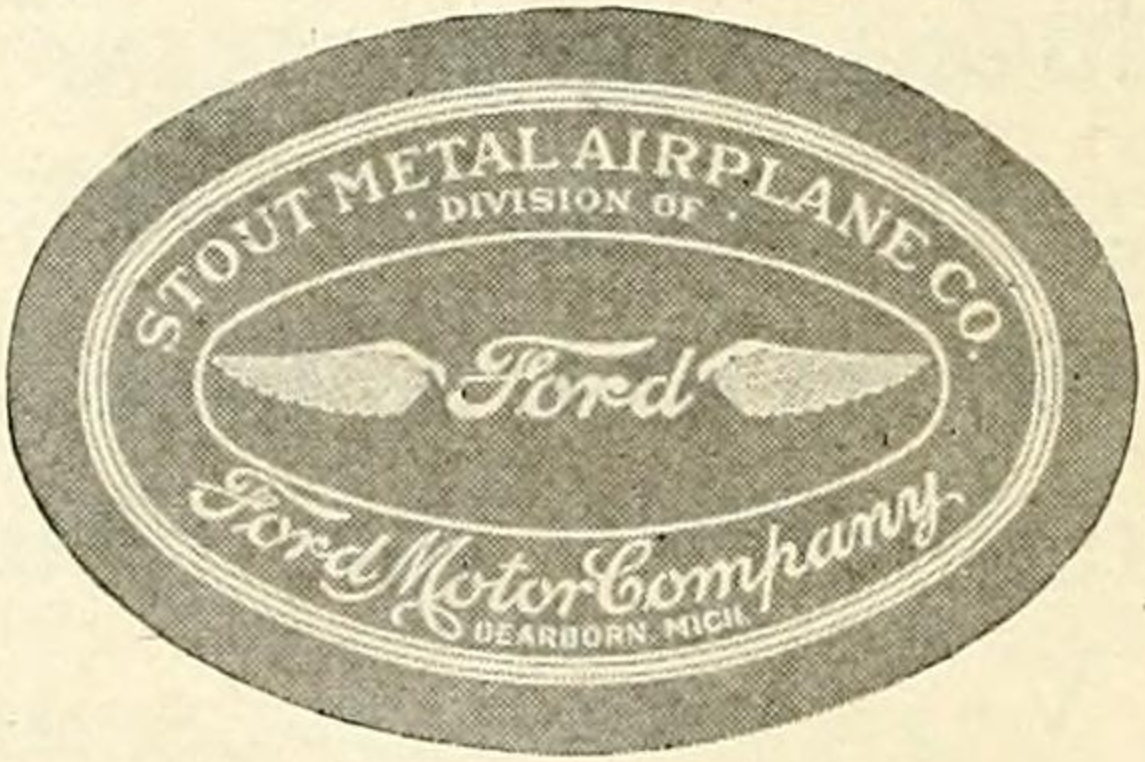
- Industry: Aerospace
- Founded: November 1922
- Founder: William Bushnell Stout
- Defunct: 1936
- Fate: Shut down
- Headquarters: Detroit, Michigan, United States
- Key people: Harry J. Brooks; Harold Hicks; Otto C. Koppen; William Benson Mayo; Thomas Towle
- Parent: Ford Motor Company (1925–1936)

Stout Metal Airplane Division of the Ford Motor Company was an American aircraft manufacturer that was founded by William Bushnell Stout as the Stout Metal Airplane Co. in 1922. The company was purchased by Ford Motor Company in 1924 and later produced the Ford Trimotor. At the height of the Great Depression, Ford closed the aircraft design and production division in 1936, temporarily re-entering the aviation market with the production of the B-24, at the Willow Run aircraft factory during World War II.

== History ==
=== Early Ford aviation interest ===
In 1909 Henry Ford lent three factory workers to his 15-year-old son Edsel, and Edsel's friend Charles Van Auken, to build a monoplane with a Model T engine. The Blériot XI inspired plane featured wing warping controls and a radiator perpendicular to the wind. The plane did not fly well in multiple test flights from the Fort Wayne parade grounds − the final flight ended in a tree − and the project was put aside. In World War I Ford went into the aircraft motor business with production of the Packard-designed Liberty engine for the military. Ford completed 3,950 Liberty engines. The newly formed Lincoln was bought by Ford in 1922.

=== Stout ===
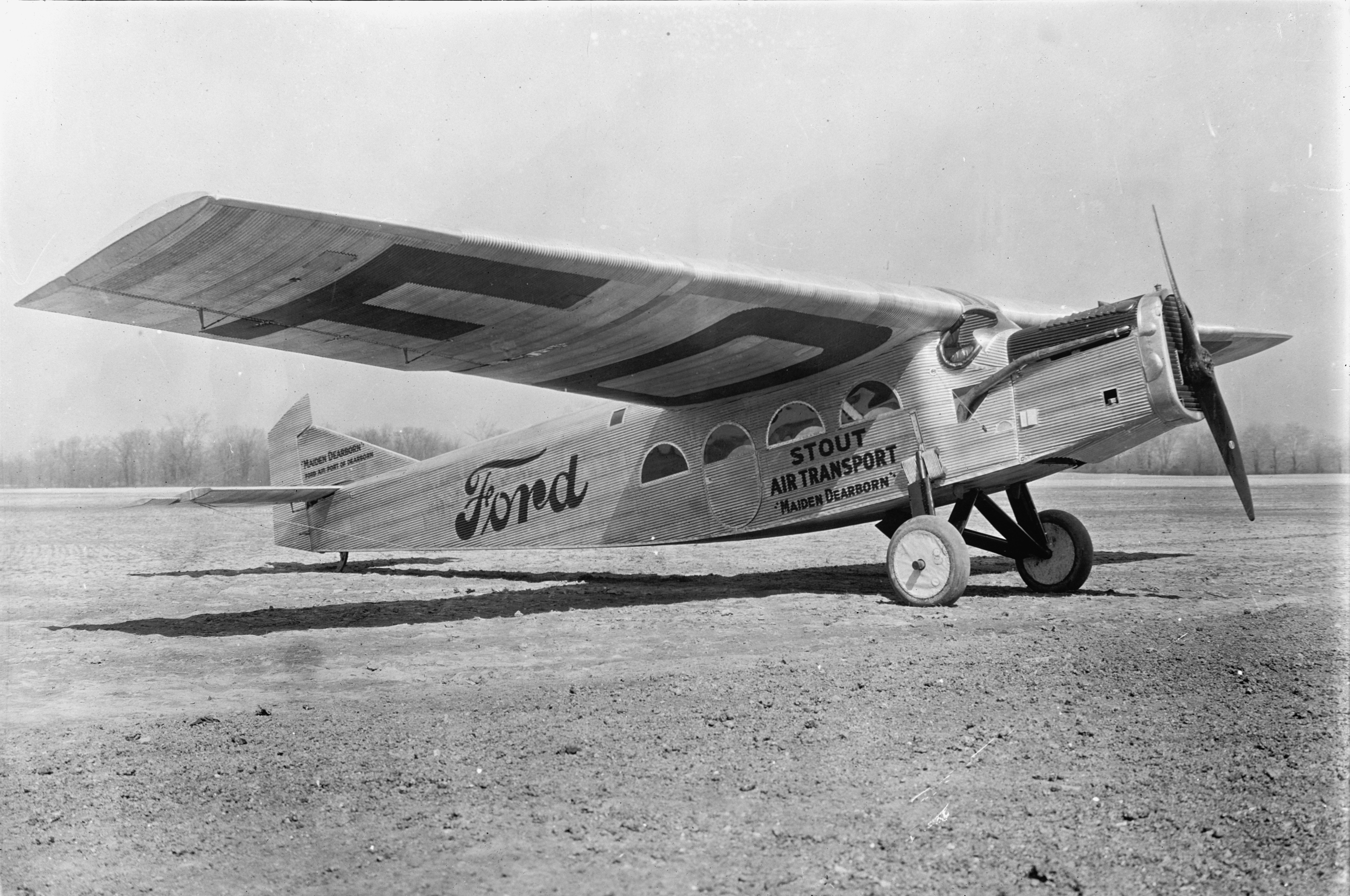
Stout 2-AT Pullman "Maiden Dearborn"

William Stout was appointed to the board of the Aircraft Production Board in 1917. The board awarded Stout with a contract to build a blended wing fuselage aircraft, the Stout Batwing, intended for the US Army air service. One example was built and abandoned. In 1919 Stout formed Stout Engineering Laboratories. With money from the Champion Spark Plug corporation, Stout built the three-passenger Batwing Limousine in 1920. This was eventually re-skinned and had structural components replaced with duraluminum. Stout gave speeches across the country touting that all future aircraft would be metal. Soon after, Stout received a US Navy contract for three Stout ST-1 aircraft. The ST-1 was a twin-engine, all-metal torpedo bomber. Its test pilot was a record setting pilot, Eddie Stinson, who recently moved to Detroit with his own all-metal Junkers-Larsen JL-6 mailplane. A 1922 crash of the prototype canceled the contract. This led to an innovative form of financing for a new venture. He began a letter campaign requesting $1,000 from over 100 prominent businessmen. He got $128,000, including money and support from Henry and Edsel Ford. This started the Stout Metal Airplane company.

After taking over the company, and the less-than-successful performance of the Stout 3-AT, Ford reassigned Stout to speaking engagements and promotional tours. In 1927, Charles Lindbergh took the Spirit of St. Louis to Mexico on a promotional tour following its non-stop flight over the Atlantic. Stout arranged with Henry and Edsel Ford to fly Lindbergh's mother to Mexico City to join her son for Christmas and to gain publicity for the new Ford aircraft. In addition to Mrs. Lindbergh, Stout, his wife, other Ford executives and two pilots went on the trip. The Ford Tri-motor they flew, NC-1077, is today in Greg Herrick's Golden Wings Flying Museum near Minneapolis and is the oldest flying metal aircraft in the world.

William Stout left the Metal Airplane division in 1930. He continued to operate the Stout Engineering Laboratory, producing the Stout Skycar aircraft series and the Stout Scarab car. In 1954, Stout purchased the rights to the Ford Trimotor in an attempt to produce new examples. A new company formed from this effort brought back two modern examples of the trimotor aircraft, the Stout Bushmaster 2000.

Stout was later to say, "The greatest single thing I accomplished for aviation was to get Mr. Ford interested in it."

=== Edsel Ford ===
Edsel Ford became a stockholder in Stout's operations in 1922 at the age of 28. He became the president of the division in 1925. Edsel sponsored many aviation events from Ford Airport, cross-marketing his interests in airlines and aircraft production. The Ford National Reliability Air Tour gathered manufactures from around the world to compete in order to promote aviation. In 1926, he sponsored Admiral Byrd's flight to the North Pole in a Fokker F.VII named the Josephine Ford. In 1928, he sponsored his trip to the South Pole in a Ford Trimotor named the Floyd Bennett. The similarity of design between the Fokker trimotor and the later Ford Trimotor was a source of contention between designers Stout and Anthony Fokker.

=== Ford Airport ===
In 1924 Ford and Stout negotiated the building of Ford Airport in Dearborn, Michigan. A factory that would house Stout Metal Airplane production would be built if Stout could convince all 128 of the initial investors in his company to sell out to Ford. This was accomplished at a cost of $500,000 to Ford, and the Stout Metal Airplane Company became an official division of Ford Motor Company on July 1, 1925. Ford Then invested an additional $2,000,000 in the venture.

The airport site chosen was 260 acres on Dearborn's Oakwood Boulevard. Ford Airport also featured an airship mooring station and hangar to test the Ford-sponsored ZMC-2 metal-hulled airship.

=== The fire ===
The Model 3-AT trimotor was heavily promoted by Henry Ford as the airplane of the future. Test flights proved otherwise, with the underpowered aircraft barely able to maintain altitude. After witnessing the tests, Henry Ford left disgusted, and shortly afterward reassigned Stout away from engineering.

On January 16, 1926 Harold Hicks asked Tom Towle to bring all drawings of the 3-AT to the Ford Engineering Laboratory. At about 6am the next morning, a fire destroyed the Stout factory and all aircraft in it, including 13 new Wright Whirlwind engines, several 2-AT Pullmans and the Stout 3-AT Prototype. Damages were claimed to be $500,000 in 1926 dollars.

Tom Towle was placed in charge of engineering, and hired MIT graduate Otto C. Koppen, John Lee, and James Smith McDonnell (co-founder of what is now McDonnell Douglas). Together they refined the 3-AT into what is now recognizable as the "Tin Goose", the Ford Trimotor.

Ford visited and encouraged Stout that this was an opportunity to build an even better facility. The new factory had two buildings with the largest doors in the world at the time.

McDonnell would leave to the Hamilton Metalplane Company in 1927, building his own corrugated metal aircraft design that closely matched the 2-AT. It was bought by a group of investors rounded up by Stout to invest in the CAM-9 airmail route forming an entity called Northwest Airlines.

=== Production ===
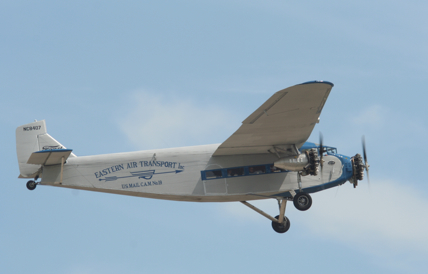
Ford 4-AT Trimotor

Ford Air Transport Service was started in 1925 to carry passengers and mail on the lucrative new airmail routes. It was assigned the first airmail routes, Cleveland-Detroit (CAM-6) and Chicago-Detroit (CAM-7). The regularly scheduled service used six Stout 2-AT aircraft. Ford became the first regularly scheduled airmail service and air freight operator.

The Ford Trimotor entered production and became a popular choice for the new airlines serving airmail contracts.

In 1927, Ford became the first company to use an assembly line for aircraft production.

Ford tried his hand at engineering in the company as well. Working along with engineer Karl Shultz, Ford submitted U.S. Patent no. 1749578 for a Ford Trimotor sized aircraft with separate sets of propellers providing thrust and lift. Similar to the Berliner helicopter or the modern V-22 Osprey, the mechanism was far too heavy to see practical use. One example was worked on in the shop and abandoned.

In 1929 Richard Byrd used a 4-AT-13 in his fleet on an expedition to be the first to fly over the South Pole.

=== Decline ===
The Trimotor sales dropped from a peak of 86 a year in 1929 to only two sales in 1932. Losses from the aircraft division totaled six million dollars. By 1933 Stout, Mayo, and Hicks had left the company. Ford Trimotor sales lagged as the depression set in. Used Trimotors flooded the market at prices between $10,000 and $40,000. As the recession eased, Ford explored a radical flying wing design in the Ford Model 15-P using its new V-8 automobile engine from the Ford Model B. After a crash of the prototype, the effort was dropped.

=== Legacy ===
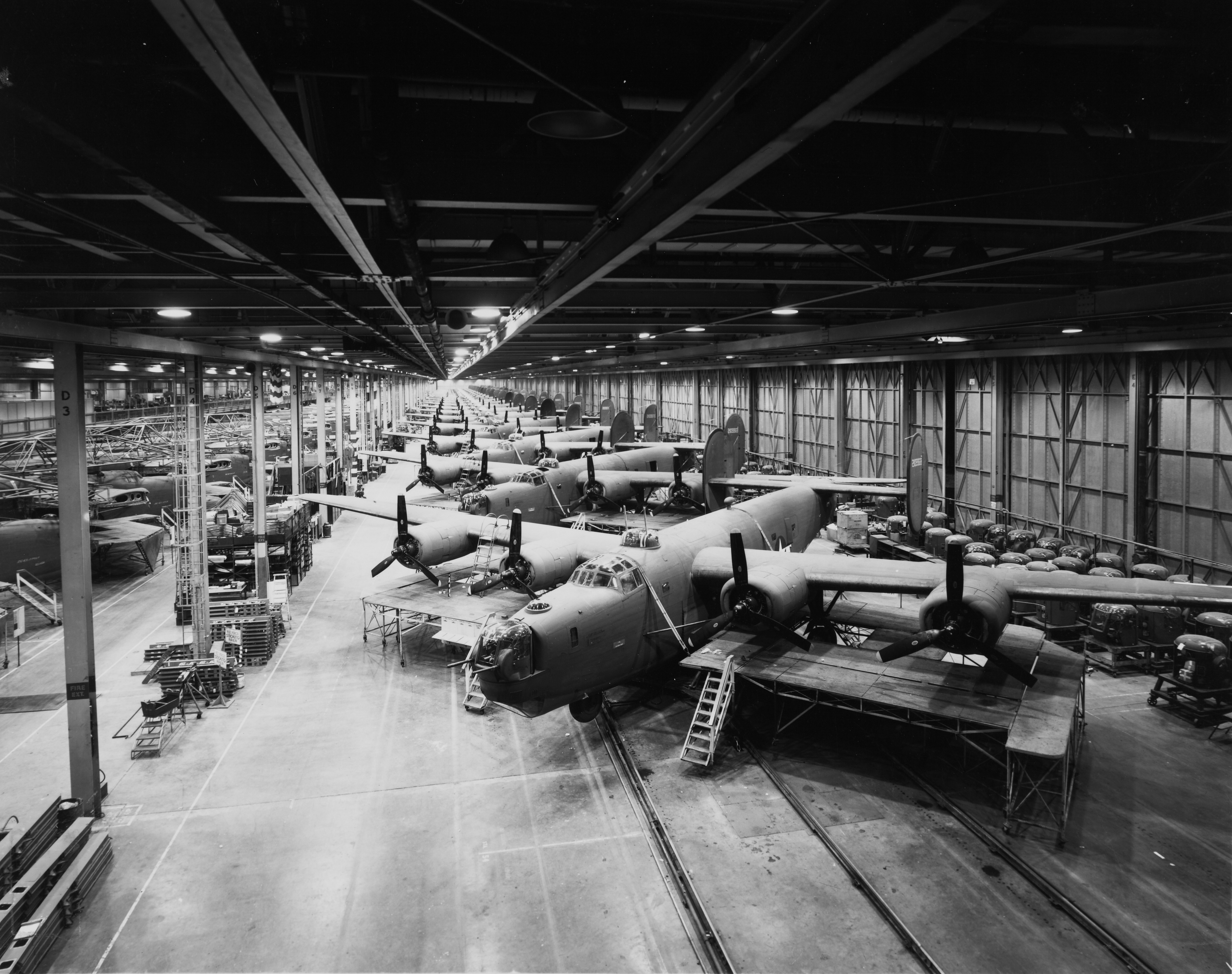
B-24's built by Ford

Ford Motor Company stopped production of new aircraft designs with the closure of the Stout Metal Airplane Division. Ford has continued to be involved in aviation in the much more profitable production role, and also has marketed its automotive products with its aviation heritage though high-profile events.

Most noteworthy is Ford's production of the B-24. Up to 650 units a month were produced at Ford's Willow Run plant until 1945. Ford also produced 2418 Waco CG-4 gliders under license for the war effort.

In 1956 Ford started the Aeronutronic division, specializing in space and defense communications. The company combined with Philco to produce space communications gear for NASA. The Ford Aerospace Corporation division was sold to Loral in 1990.

In 2001 Ford sponsored the EAA's Countdown to Kitty Hawk Ford has remained a sponsor of the EAA Airventure airshow since this event. Ford is also a major contributor to the Young Eagles program, auctioning off aviation-themed custom Mustangs each year since 1998.

== Aircraft ==
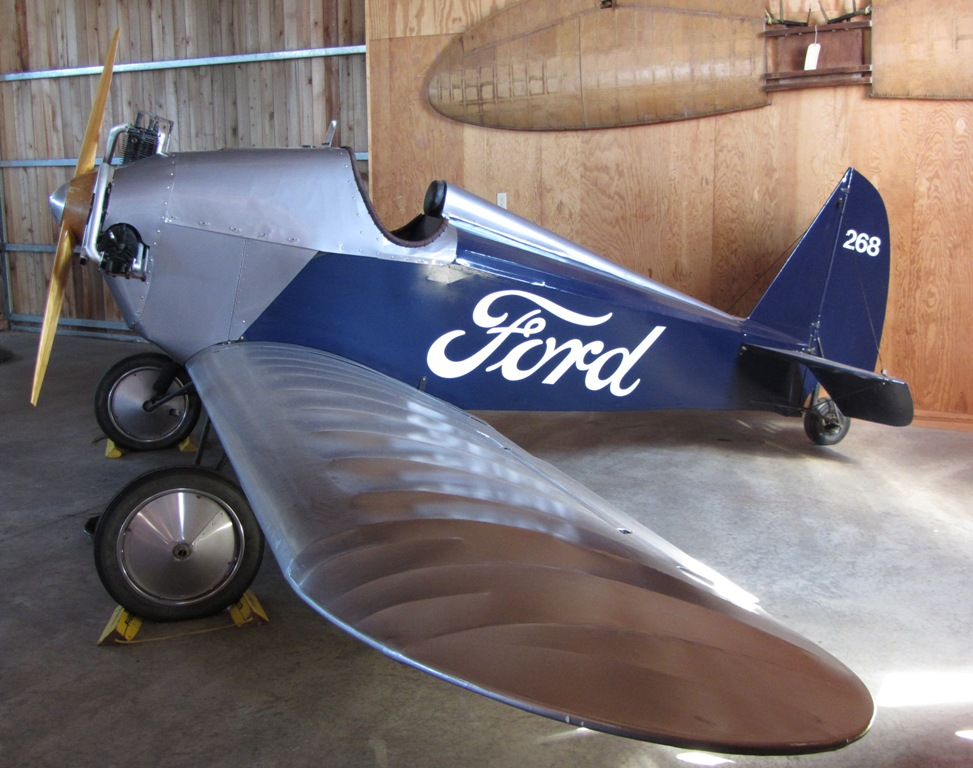
Ford Flivver

The AT moniker originates from the Stout 2-AT "Air Truck"

Model name	First flight	Number built	Type
Stout Batwing	1918	1	Experimental single engine blended-wing airplane
Stout Batwing Limousine	1920	1	Experimental single engine blended-wing airplane
Stout ST-1	1922	1	Twin engine torpedo bomber
Stout 1-AS Air Sedan	1923	1	Single engine transport
Stout 2-AT Pullman	1924	11	Single engine transport
Stout 3-AT	1924	1	Trimotor transport
Ford 4-AT	1924	79	Trimotor transport
Ford Flivver	1926	6	Single engine light airplane
Stout Dragonfly	1927	1	Experimental twin engine biplane
Ford Executive	1927	1	Single engine business airplane
Ford 5-AT	1929	121	Trimotor transport
Ford 6-AT	1929	2	Trimotor transport
Ford 7-AT	1929	1	Trimotor transport
Ford 8-AT	1929	1	Trimotor cargo plane
Ford 9-AT	1930	1	Trimotor transport
Ford 10-AT	1930	0	Four engine transport
Ford 11-AT	1930	1	Trimotor transport
Ford 12-AT	1931	1	Trimotor transport
Ford 13-AT	1931	1	Trimotor transport
Ford 14-A	1932	1	Trimotor transport
Ford 15-P	1932	1	Experimental single engine flying wing

== See also ==
- Ford Aerospace
- Stout Air Services
