= Stout Batwing =

Batwing
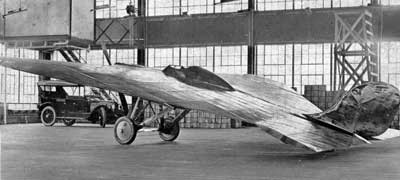
- The first Batwing at Dayton, Ohio’s McCook Aviation Field circa 1918

General information
- Type: Experimental
- National origin: United States
- Manufacturer: Stout Engineering Laboratories
- Designer: William Bushnell Stout
- Number built: 1

History
- Introduction date: 1918
- First flight: 13 January 1919
- Developed from: Batwing "Vampire"

The Stout Batwing was an experimental low aspect ratio flying wing aircraft developed by William Bushnell Stout. The aircraft used wood veneer construction and was an early example of cantilever wing design. The internally braced wing was also one of the first American aircraft designed without drag-producing struts.

== Development ==
During World War I, William Bushnell Stout was employed by Packard in 1917 when he was appointed as a technical advisor to the War production board, who gave Stout a contract to develop an aircraft. Funded by the Motor Products Corporation, Stout developed the "Batwing" aircraft hoping to sell the aircraft to the United States Army Air Service. Stout first experimented with an all-wood flying wing glider, the "Batwing Glider", tested at Ford Airport in 1926. Stout's design was nicknamed "Bushnell's Turtle" (a reference to the unrelated David Bushnell's American Turtle shape).

== Design ==
The Batwing was designed with an unusually broad chord, thick section of cantilevered wing with the horizontal stabilizers set very close to the rear of the aircraft.

The wings were covered with a three-ply wood veneer only 1/20 of an inch thick. The internal bracing consisted of hundreds of spruce struts. Nine spars tested to 1 ton of load each. Likely encountering a Junkers F.13, Bill Stout abandoned wood construction for metal corrugated skinning over a metal frame.

To reduce drag, the aircraft employed a cantilever wing without support wires or struts. This required a "thick" wing to build a spar deep enough to support the aircraft. To maintain the thin airfoil sections commonly used at the time, the chord also had to be longer, as the wing became thicker. In the case of the Batwing, the chord was almost the entire length of the aircraft. Since the spar did not need to be as thick toward the tips to support the load, the chord decreased further out along the wing, forming an oval-shaped wing. As ideal as this was, it caused significant engineering challenges. Further aerodynamic drag reductions came from having the water-cooled engine embedded into the wing with retractable radiators.

The pilot sat in an open cockpit placed at the top of the aircraft. Downward visibility was restricted by the wing. The Batwing was the first example of a cantilevered wing designed and built in the United States.

== Operational history ==
The mockup of his first thick-winged aircraft design was built at the Widman woodworking plant in Detroit, Michigan. The 150 hp engine was acquired from Charles W. Nash, who had an interest in the project. The first flight was in Dayton, Ohio, on 13 January 1919. The pump shaft on the engine was broken, but the plane was flown anyway. Although the flight was successful, the test pilot Jimmie Johnson commented that the aircraft was too dangerous to fly because of the poor visibility. Stout later called the visibility "abominable". The test aircraft was put into storage. Soon afterward, Stout submitted British patent #149,708: a Batwing aircraft with the corners squared off rather than the oval design of the prototype. The updated aircraft was never produced. Stout went on to focus on more conventional aircraft featuring the advancement of all-metal construction but maintained that the airplane of the future would look like the Batwing.

== Variants ==
Stout drew up plans for a scaled-up version of the Batwing, with a 100-foot wingspan. The larger aircraft may have solved the visibility issues but did not get past the planning stage. The all-metal "Batwing 11" was publicized as being capable of 200 mph with a forty-foot wingspan and magnesium construction.

Stout also used the term "batwing" in the name of future aircraft that used cantilever wings.

== Specifications (Batwing) ==
Data from SAE Dec 1922

General characteristics

- Wingspan: 20 ft (6.1 m)
- Wing area: 480 sq ft (45 m^{2})
- Empty weight: 1,542 lb (699 kg)
- Powerplant: 1 × Hispano-Suiza 8 V-8 water-cooled piston engine, 150 hp (110 kW)

Performance

== See also ==
Related development

- Stout Batwing Limousine

Aircraft of comparable role, configuration, and era

- ARUP S-4
