= Walter E. Lees =

American aviator (1887–1957)

Walter Edwin Lees
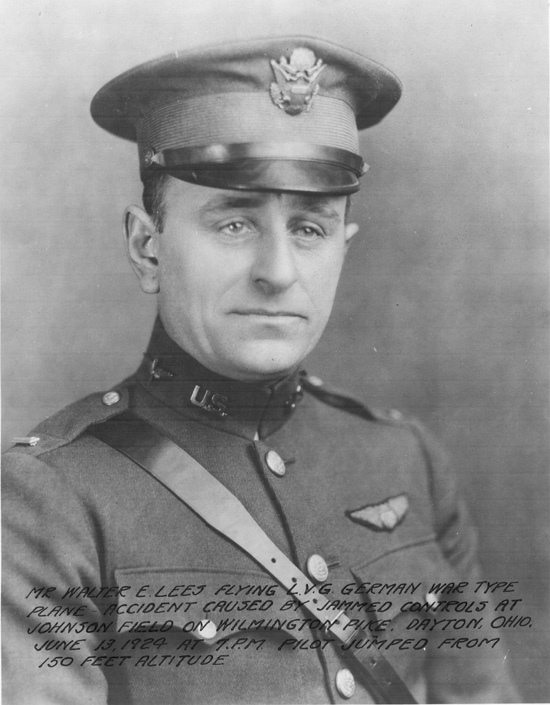
- Born: Walter Edwin Lees; July 16, 1887; Janesville, Wisconsin, U.S.
- Died: May 16, 1957 (aged 69)
- Education: University of Wisconsin–Madison
- Spouse: Loa Lloyd

Walter Edwin Lees (July 16, 1887 – May 16, 1957) was an early American aviator who set a flight endurance record in 1931.

== Biography ==
He was born on July 16, 1887, in Janesville, Wisconsin, and attended the University of Wisconsin–Madison. He made his first solo flight on November 14, 1912, near St. Louis, Missouri. He joined the Army Air Service as a civilian flying instructor in 1917, and married Loa Lloyd. He worked as a pilot, test pilot, instructor, and barnstormer. He also worked as a mechanic in the Army Air Service at Wright Field between 1919 and 1920. In the mid-1920s he test flew aircraft for the Stout Engineering Company. He and Frederick Brossy made a world's non-refueling duration record at Jacksonville Beach, Florida, in 1931 with a flight time of 84 hours and 32 minutes in a Bellanca J2 Diesel. His military service included five years as a pilot in the Air Force Reserve Command, and 20 years as pilot in the United States Navy Reserve, and 6 years active duty with the Navy from 1940 to 1946. He retired from the Navy in 1948 with the rank of Commander. He was active in aviation for over 35 years and flew approximately 12,000 hours, in over 60 different types of planes.

He died on May 16, 1957.
