= William Bushnell Stout =

American inventor, engineer, and designer

- Stout in 1947 with model of his skycar
- Born: March 16, 1880; Quincy, Illinois, U.S.
- Died: March 20, 1956 (aged 76); Phoenix, Arizona, U.S.
- Education: Hamline University; University of Minnesota

William Bushnell Stout (March 16, 1880 – March 20, 1956) was a pioneering American inventor, engineer, developer and designer whose works in the automotive and aviation fields were groundbreaking. Known by the nickname "Bill", Stout designed an aircraft that eventually became the Ford Trimotor and was an executive at the Ford Motor Company.

== Early years ==
William Bushnell "Bill" Stout was born March 16, 1880, in Quincy, Illinois. He graduated from the Mechanic Arts High School, in St. Paul, Minnesota, in 1898. He then attended Hamline University, and transferred in his second year to the University of Minnesota, being forced to quit due to extreme eye problems. He married Alma Raymond in 1906. Stout was interested in mechanics, especially aeronautics, founding the Model Aero Club of Illinois. In 1907 he became Chief Engineer for the Schurmeir Motor Truck Company and in 1912, he became automobile and aviation editor for the Chicago Tribune. In the same year he founded Aerial Age, the first aviation magazine ever published in the United States. He was also a contributor to the Minneapolis Times under the pen name, "Jack Knieff."

== Automotive career ==
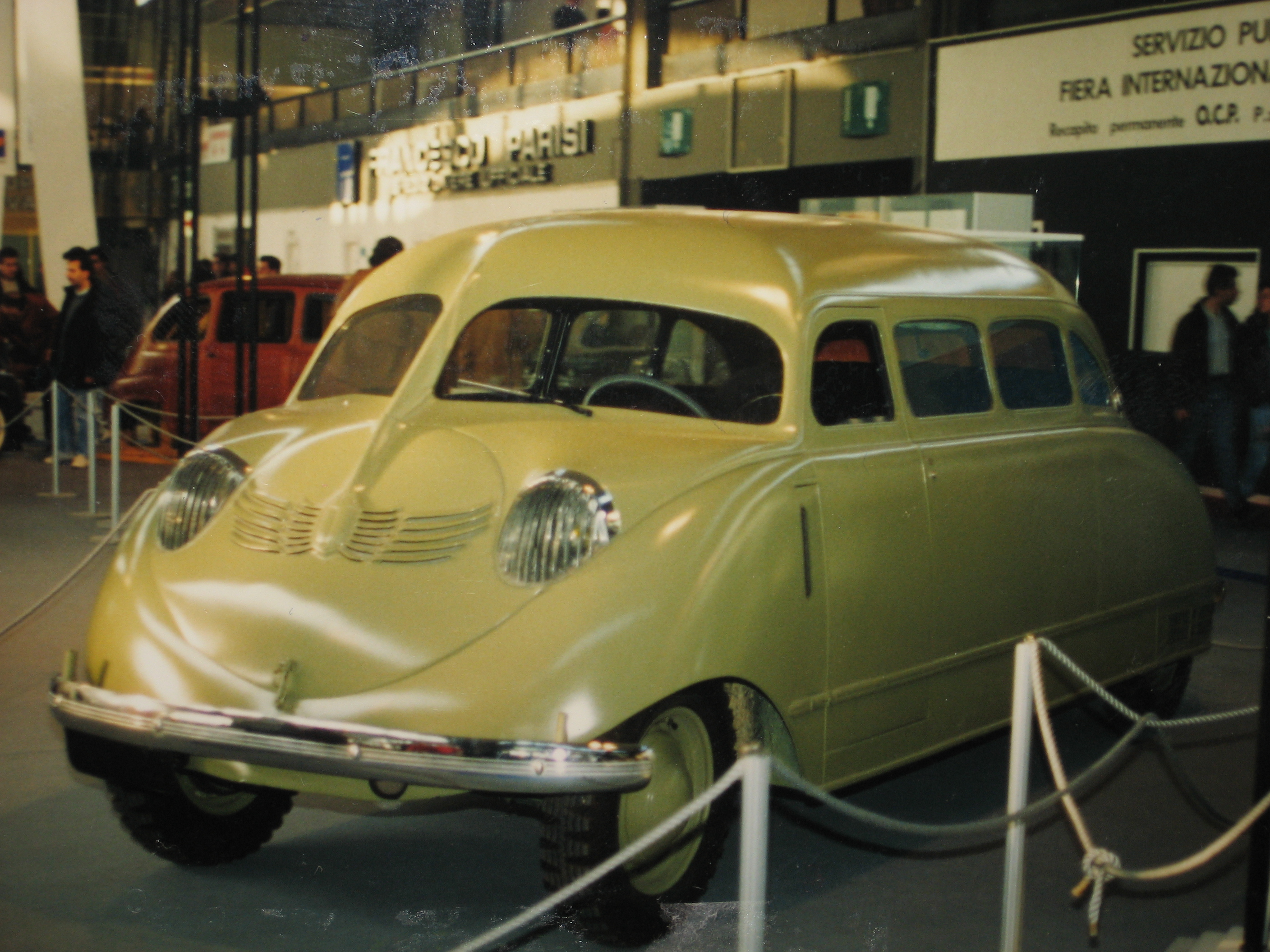
Stout Scarab

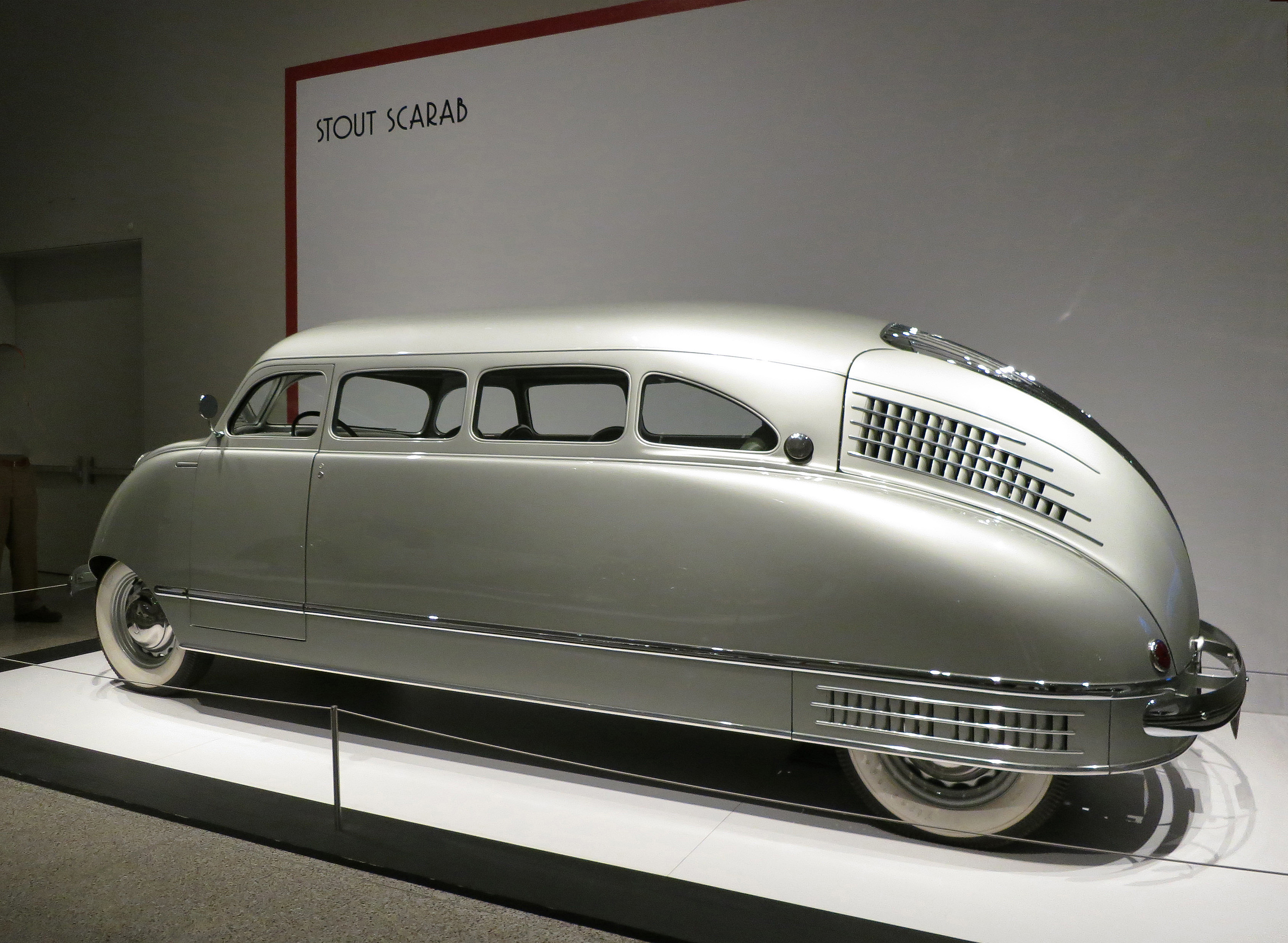
Stout Scarab

In 1914, Stout became Chief Engineer of the Scripps-Booth Automobile Company. In 1916, when Packard Motor Car Company started an aviation division, they asked Stout to become its first Chief Engineer. In 1919 he started the Stout Engineering Company in Dearborn, Michigan, complete with a research section and later built the prototype Stout Scarab car in 1932. In 1934 he founded the Stout Motor Car Company.

In the mid-1930s, Stout, in co-operation with L.B. Kalb of Continental Motors, a major manufacture of lightweight air cooled aircraft engines, did some extensive research and pre-production development into rear engine drive automobiles which were powered by aircraft engines. Stout even commissioned the well known Dutch auto designer John Tjaarda to design some streamlined car bodies, although none of the car designs ever reached production.

In the last years of World War II, Stout, in co-operation with Owen-Corning, began what was called Project Y to build a one-off car for evaluation of ideas like a frame-less fiberglass body, belt drive rear wheel drive, a suspension which kept the vehicle from leaning into turns by adjusting the suspension using compressed air, and push button electric doors. When the vehicle was made public in 1946, Stout picked the name Forty-Six for that year. Some firms considered producing the Forty-Six, but as Stout stated he doubted there would be much of a market for a $10,000 car, the estimated price if it had been mass-produced.

== Aviation career ==
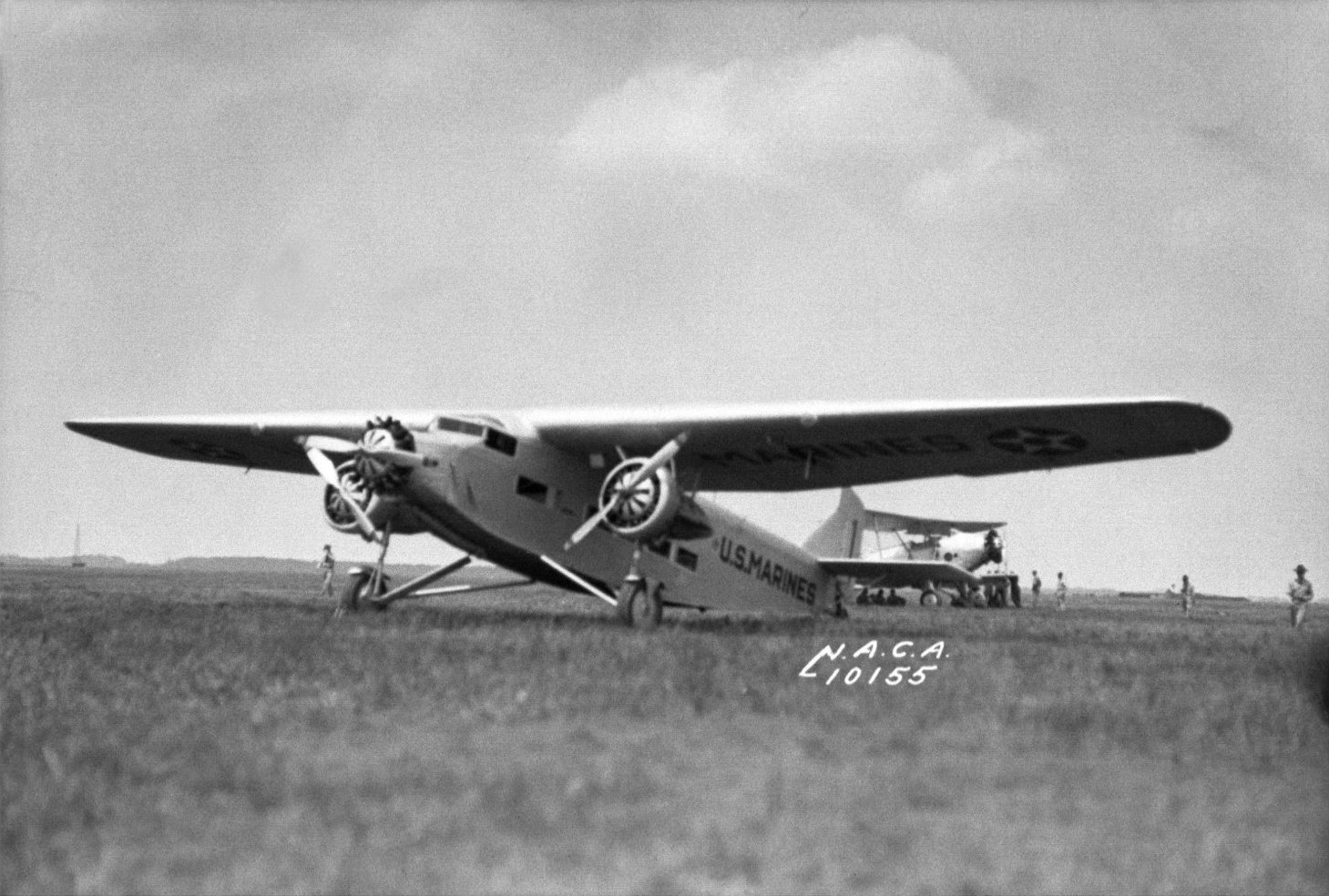
Ford Trimotor

External image
- Mr. Stout standing in front of an airplane.

Stout's aviation career began as a result of his success in his automotive efforts. He began to build a number of all-metal aircraft designs, which, like the earliest aircraft designs of Andrei Tupolev in the Soviet Union, was based on the pioneering work of Hugo Junkers. In February 1923, newspapers carried stories of the test flights of the Stout Air Sedan with Walter Lees as the pilot. In 1924 his company, the Stout Metal Airplane Company, was bought by the Ford Motor Company.

Stout developed a thick-wing monoplane, and his design of an internally braced cantilevered wing improved the efficiency of aircraft. This led to the development of the famous "Batwing Plane" and the all-metal "Torpedo Plane". After his career at Packard Motors, he left for Washington to serve as the advisor to the United States Aircraft Board.

Stout developed an all-metal transport aircraft for mail use, the Stout 2-AT. His three engine follow-on, the Stout 3-AT, was underpowered, and did not perform as well, leaving Stout out of the engineering role in his company newly acquired by Ford. The redesigned 3-AT did form the basis for the popular Ford Trimotor aircraft.

In August 1925, Stout inaugurated Stout Air Services, which operated the first regularly scheduled airline in the United States. Stout also built the Liberty-powered all-metal monoplanes to initiate this service. Later, between 1928 and 1932, the airline flew passengers and Ford cargo between Dearborn, Chicago and Cleveland. In 1929, Stout sold Stout Air Services to United Airlines.

After the Great Depression in 1929 reduced sales of the Trimotor aircraft, Stout left Ford in 1930. Although no longer with Ford, he continued to operate his Stout Engineering Laboratory. Stout also invested in the short-lived Wichita, Kansas based Buckley Aircraft Company, developing the all-aluminum Buckley LC-4.

In 1930 Stout said: "Aviation in the U.S. has been stagnating for two years. We are all copying. Aviation has shown no progress ... comparable to that made in radio and talking pictures. Think how many copies have been made of the plane Colonel Lindbergh used on his flight across the Atlantic ... of other famous planes. None of us are building the plane that the public wants to buy, and that proves we are standing still."

In 1943 Stout sold the Stout engineering laboratory to Consolidated Vultee Aircraft Corporation becoming the Stout Research Division of Consolidated. He was named the director of Convair's research division through World War II. While at Consolidated, Stout promoted three designs for postwar production, including a flying car using a Spratt wing.

Stout's other innovations included the Skycar, an automobile/airplane hybrid and a Pullman Railplane and Club Car. He is also known as the originator of prefab housing and the sliding car seat. All of these innovations were modern in design, incorporating many features new in both appearance and function, features not yet available in vehicle design.

== Death ==
Stout retired to Phoenix, Arizona, and died on March 20, 1956, four days after his 76th birthday.

== Publications ==
Stout self-published a small booklet (15 pp.) of poems, circa 1936. Two of the poems were in the form of letters: On Receiving Word that Stan Knauss Was Joining the Air Corps (September 18, 1918) and On Stan Becoming a Father (December 4, 1930). His autobiography, So Away I Went!, was published in 1951.

== Legacy ==
Stout is remembered for his engineering credo, "Simplicate and add more lightness." This would later become best known as the adopted maxim of Colin Chapman of Lotus Cars. It actually originated with Stout's designer Gordon Hooton.
