= Carr Special =

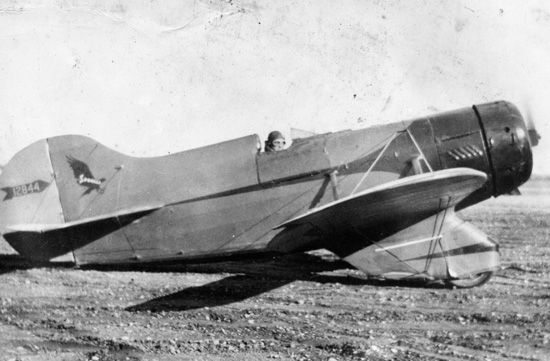

General information
- Type: Racing aircraft
- National origin: United States
- Designer: Walter J. Carr, Ralph Koehler
- Number built: 1

History
- First flight: 19 August 1932
- Developed from: Travel Air 2000

The Carr Special, also called the Carr Racer, the Saginaw Junior, and the Blackhawk, was an American low-wing monoplane racing aircraft developed in 1931.

== Design and development ==
In 1932, the founder of Paramount Aircraft Corporation left his failing company at the peak of the Great Depression, and attempted to pursue revenue in the potentially lucrative air race competitions. The construction of the aircraft was sponsored by the Saginaw Junior Chamber of Commerce, prompting the nose art "Saginaw Junior". The Carr Special was built to compete in the Curtiss OX-5-powered class of the 1932 National Air Races, where many of the competitors were still biplanes.

The Carr Special was built around part of the fuselage as well as the OX-5 engine from a Travel Air 2000 biplane. It was a low wing strut-braced conventional landing gear monoplane with steel tube construction with aircraft fabric covering.

== Operational history ==
The Carr Special was entered in the 1932 National Air Races in the "Free for All", but pulled out after being lapped by all but one other entrant, and in the precision landing contest. Despite the poor showing, the aircraft would later win 22 races. The aircraft was then modified for skywriting, and later modified again with a 125 hp (93 kW) Warner Scarab radial engine. On 19 September 1936, Kenny Barber placed second in the 550 cu in (9.0 L) class at Pontiac, Michigan. The aircraft was destroyed in 1937 at Southfield, Michigan.

== Specifications (Carr Special) ==
Data from Skyways

General characteristics

- Crew: one
- Length: 15 ft 9 in (4.80 m)
- Wingspan: 22 ft 0 in (6.71 m)
- Airfoil: M6
- Empty weight: 1,050 lb (476 kg)
- Powerplant: 1 × Miller Overhead Valve converted Curtiss OX-5 V-8, 150 hp (110 kW)

Performance

- Maximum speed: 180 mph (290 km/h, 160 kn)
