= Paramount Model 120 Sportster =

Model 120 Sportster

General information
- Type: Floatplane
- National origin: United States
- Manufacturer: Paramount Aircraft Corporation
- Designer: Ralph Johnson

History
- Introduction date: 1931
- First flight: 10 April 1931

The Paramount Model 120 Sportster floatplane, also called the Paramount Model 120 Speedster for the landplane version, was an attempt to build a low production aircraft suitable for the small high-end market during the depression era economy.

== Design and development ==
Walter J. Carr and Ed Behse founded the Paramount Aircraft Corporation to build the Paramount Cabinaire enclosed biplane. After poor sales of the aircraft, Carr left the company and Behse pursued a new design using the Warner engine used in the Cabinaire.

The Sportster was a two-seat side-by-side configuration open-cockpit, strut-braced, low-wing monoplane with a radial engine and float landing gear sourced from Aircraft Products. The prototype was built in six weeks and featured a red leather interior.

== Operational history ==
The prototype was test flown and then demonstrated at the 1931 National Aircraft Show in Detroit, receiving several orders. On 16 May 1931 company owner Behse gave demonstration rides in the aircraft. On the second flight of the day, his passenger was Whitney Merritt, who helped assemble the aircraft. The aircraft took off, climbed to 150 feet of altitude and dove into the water, killing both occupants. The company was dissolved soon after.

== Specifications (Paramount Model 120 Sportster) ==
Data from Skyways

General characteristics

- Crew: one
- Capacity: two
- Length: 23 ft 9 in (7.24 m)
- Wingspan: 30 ft (9.1 m)
- Height: 10 ft 2 in (3.10 m)
- Wing area: 130 sq ft (12 m^{2})
- Empty weight: 1,060 lb (481 kg)
- Gross weight: 1,600 lb (726 kg)
- Powerplant: 1 × Warner Scarab radial engine, 110 hp (82 kW)
