= Commercial C-1 Sunbeam =

C-1 Sunbeam

General information
- Type: Biplane
- National origin: United States
- Manufacturer: Commercial Aircraft Corp

History
- Manufactured: 1929

The Commercial C-1 Sunbeam was a long-range biplane used in record-setting flights of the 1920s.

== Design ==
The conventional landing gear-equipped biplane featured a two-seat open cockpit and a four-passenger enclosed cabin. The fuselage is constructed with welded steel tubing with fabric covering. The wheels were covered with large streamlined wheel pants.

== Operational history ==
On November 27, 1929, Elinor Smith and Bobbie Trout set a 42-hour endurance record over Los Angeles flying a C-1 Sunbeam refueled three times from a Curtiss Carrier Pigeon mail plane. Although the Sunbeam was performing well, the Carrier Pigeon support plane had mechanical difficulties after the third day. 672 gallons of fuel were used in the attempt, making Smith and Trout the first women to refuel in the air.

== Variants ==
Commercial Sunbeam C-102
X-564M used a 300 hp (224 kW) Wright J-6 radial engine for the endurance flights of 1929 and 1931.

== Specifications (Commercial C-1 Sunbeam) ==
Data from Aerofiles

General characteristics

- Capacity: 6
- Length: 27 ft (8.2 m)
- Wingspan: 34 ft (10 m)
- Powerplant: 1 × Curtiss Wright J-5 Whirlwind Radial, 220 hp (160 kW)

Performance

- Maximum speed: 109 kn (125 mph, 201 km/h)
- Cruise speed: 96 kn (110 mph, 180 km/h)
- Stall speed: 40 kn (46 mph, 74 km/h)
- Range: 430 nmi (500 mi, 800 km)
