= Douglas mailplanes =

Mail plane family by the Douglas Aircraft Company

M-1/M-2/M-3/M-4
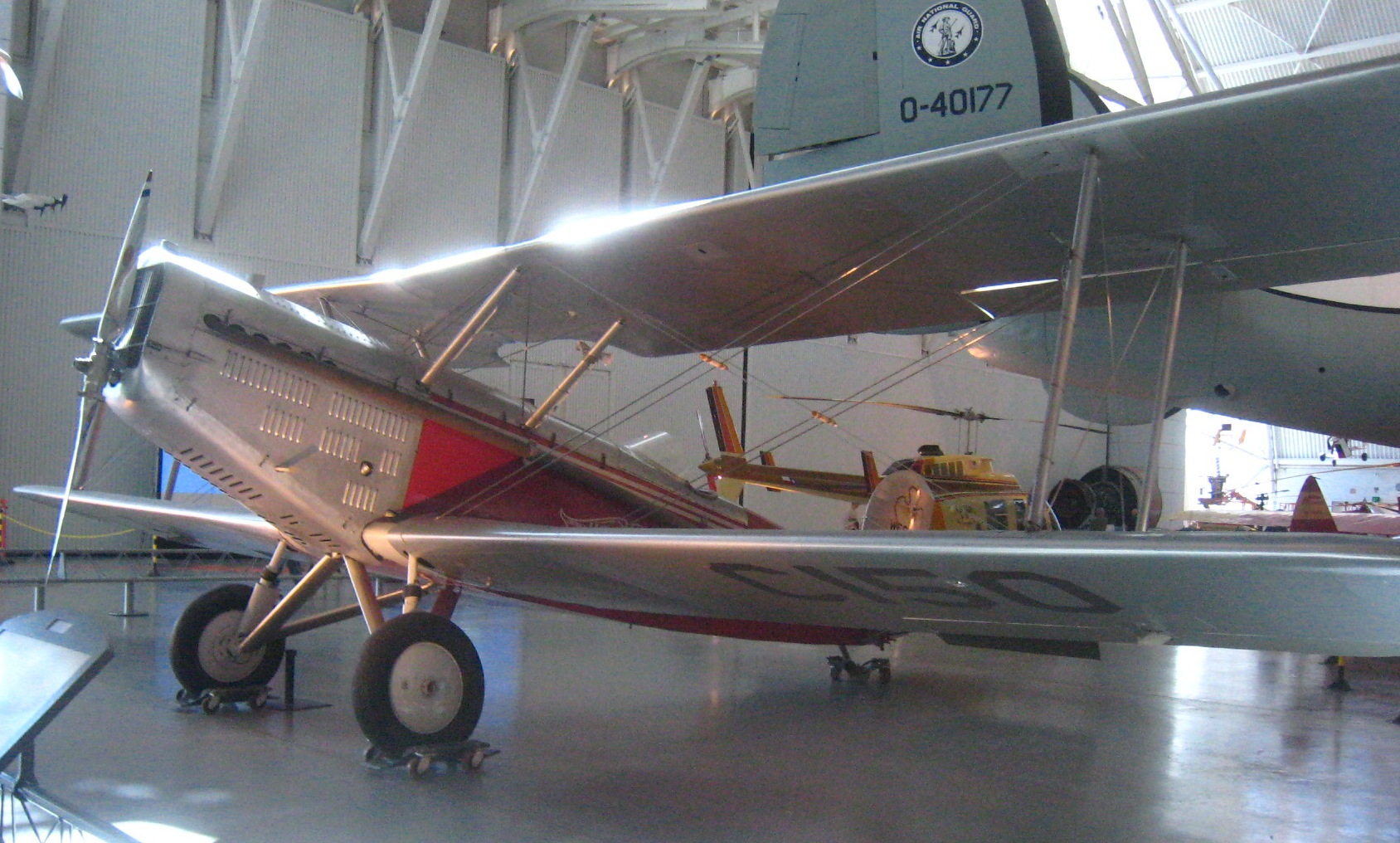

General information
- Type: Single-seat mailplanes
- Manufacturer: Douglas Aircraft
- Primary users: United States Post Office Western Air Express; National Air Transport Inc
- Number built: 57

History
- Introduction date: 1926
- First flight: 1925

The Douglas mailplanes are a family of 1920s American single-seat mail planes designed and built by the Douglas Aircraft Company. The aircraft were used to run the main routes of the United States Air Mail service until the introduction of three-engined aircraft in 1928.

== Development ==
The United States Post Office had been running the air mail service since 1918 mainly using variants of the de Havilland DH.4 biplane. In 1925, it decided to modernize and placed an order with Douglas for a replacement aircraft based on the Douglas O-2 observation biplane. The company modified an O-2 by covering over the forward cockpit to make a mail compartment and moving the pilot into what had been the observer's cockpit. The aircraft was designated the DAM-1 (Douglas Air-Mail-One) but this was soon shortened to M-1. The M-1 used the same Liberty engine as the DH.4, which was available in large numbers. Small modifications were made to the exhaust system to keep fumes away from the pilot and the design was considered a success, but was not ordered into production.

When the Contract Air Mail (CAM) routes were introduced, the newly formed Western Air Express Company (later Western Airlines) ordered six mailplanes with the designation M-2. The main change from the M-1 was that the tunnel radiator was replaced with a frontal type. It also had the provision to carry a passenger instead of mail in the front cockpit. Just before Western Air Express introduced the aircraft into service (in April 1926 from Los Angeles to Salt Lake City), the Post Office ordered 50 aircraft designated M-3 for its major route network. The M-3 had only detailed differences from the M-2.

Douglas then redesigned the M-3 to try to increase the payload, and the new aircraft was designated the M-4. The M-4 had a new longer span wing and the Post Office converted some of the M-3s order to be built as M-4s. One M-4 was also bought by Western Air Express and this was designated the M-4A.

When the CAM-3 (Chicago-Dallas) route was passed to National Air Transport Inc (NAT) in October 1925, the airline originally used the Curtiss Carrier Pigeon. When the Post Office retired its aircraft in July 1926 after all the routes had been privatized, NAT bought ten M-3s and eight M-4s at auction. NAT bought other aircraft and at one point had a fleet of 24 Douglas mailplanes in use. Some of the NAT M-3s were modified by them with longer-span wings from 1928 onwards. One M-4 was re-engined by NAT with a Pratt & Whitney Hornet radial engine. With the introduction of three-engined aircraft types beginning in 1928, the Douglas mailplanes were withdrawn from service; some were sold but most were scrapped.

== Variants ==
M-1
Prototype mailplane modified from the Douglas O-2
M-2
Production mailplane for Western Air Express

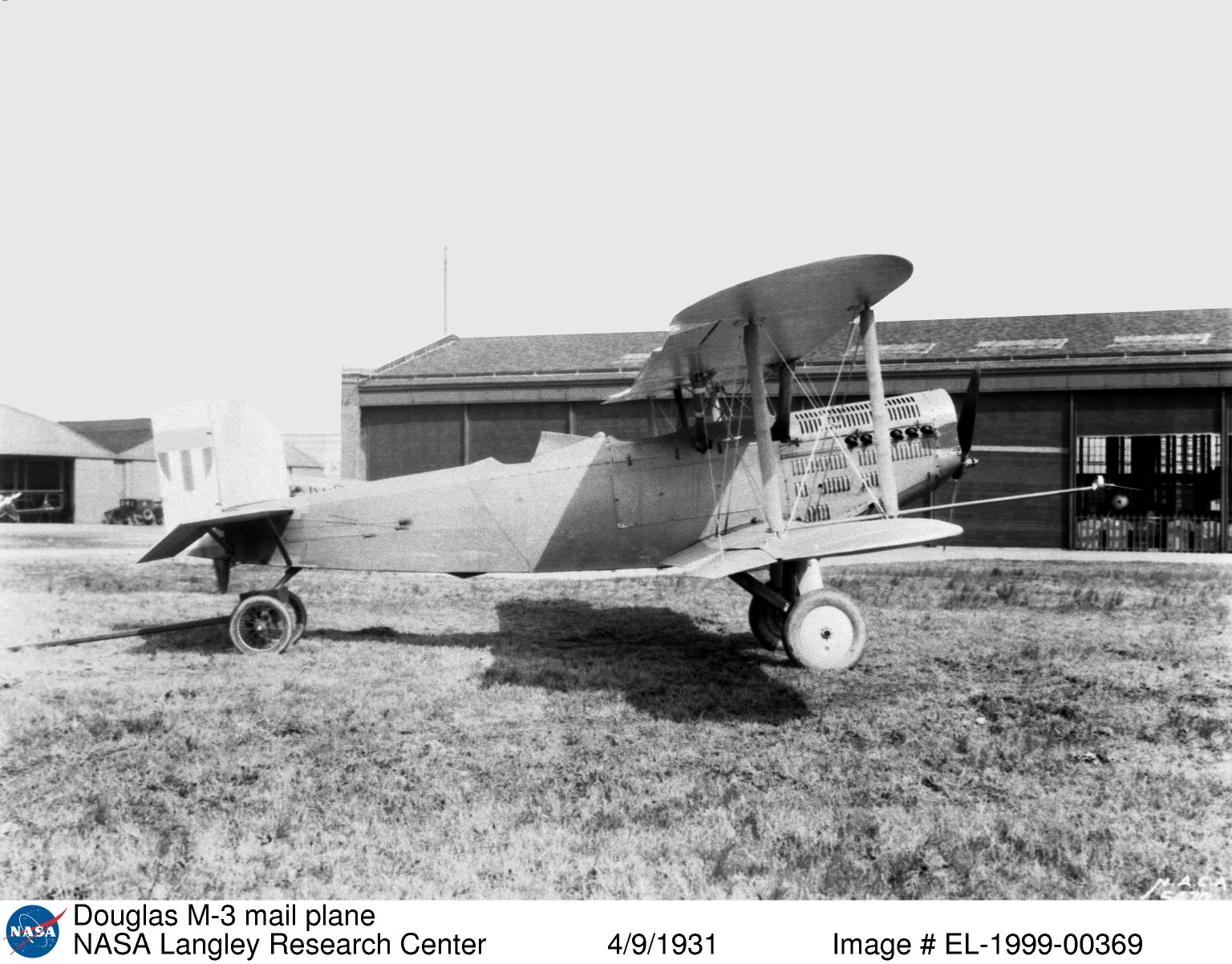
Douglas M-3 at Langley

M-3
Production mailplane for United States Post Office
M-4

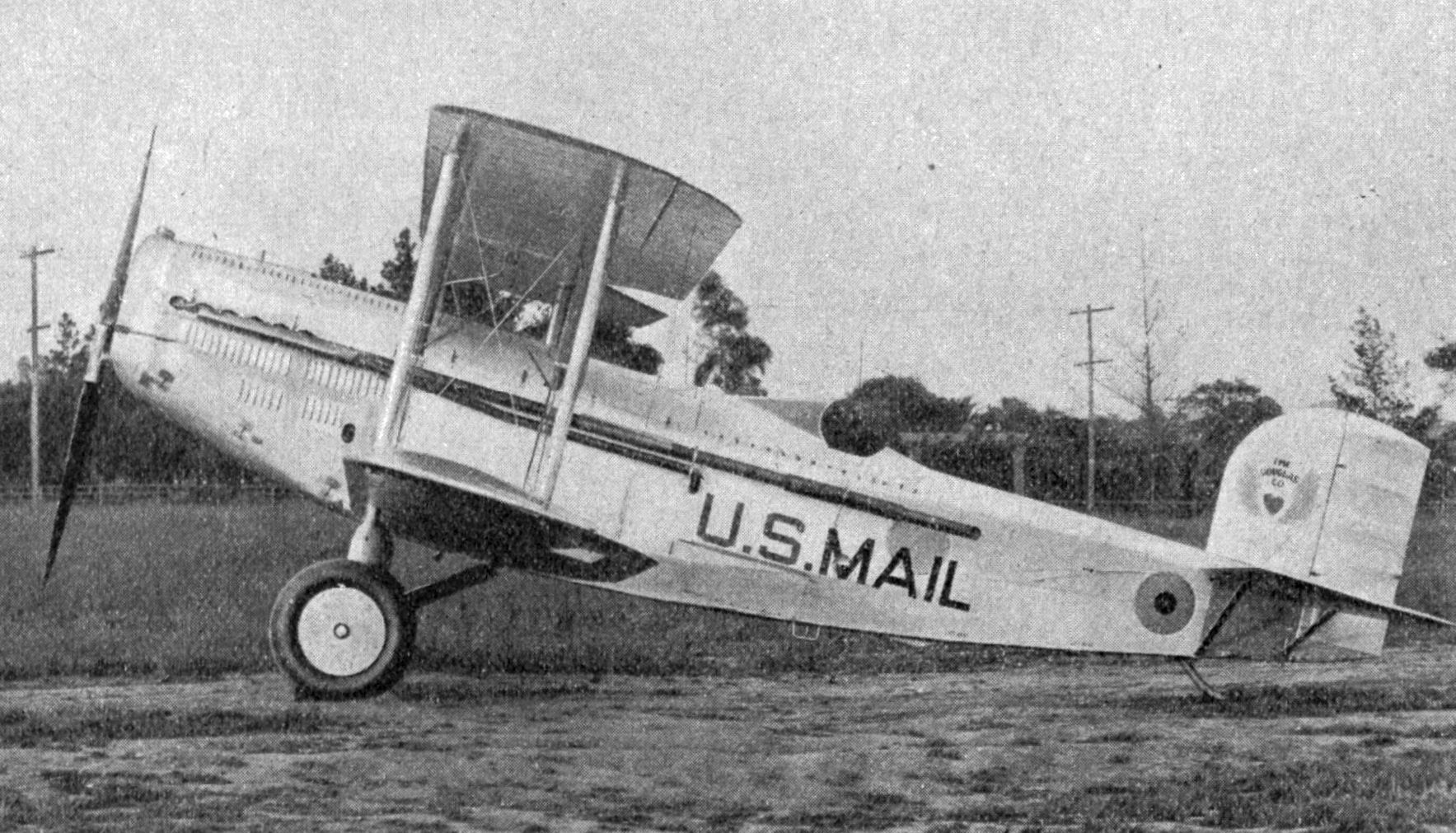
Douglas M-4 photo from L'Année aéronautique 1926

Modified mailplane with stretched wing for United States Post Office.
M-4A
One M-4 for Western Air Express
MO-2B
A three-seat general purpose biplane developed directly from the M series of mailplanes, despite the O-2 designation.

== Operators ==
United States

- National Air Transport
- United States Post Office
- Western Air Express

== Specifications (M-4) ==
Data from McDonnell Douglas aircraft since 1920 : Volume I, The Illustrated Encyclopedia of Aircraft

General characteristics

- Crew: 1
- Length: 28 ft 11 in (8.81 m)
- Wingspan: 44 ft 6 in (13.56 m)
- Height: 10 ft 1 in (3.07 m)
- Wing area: 465 sq ft (43.2 m^{2})
- Airfoil: Clark Y
- Empty weight: 3,405 lb (1,544 kg)
- Gross weight: 4,900 lb (2,223 kg)

Performance

- Maximum speed: 140 mph (230 km/h, 120 kn) at sea level
- Cruise speed: 110 mph (180 km/h, 96 kn)
- Range: 700 mi (1,100 km, 610 nmi)
- Service ceiling: 16,500 ft (5,000 m)
- Rate of climb: 1,000 ft/min (5.1 m/s)
- Wing loading: 10.5 lb/sq ft (51 kg/m^{2})
- Power/mass: 0.0813 hp/lb (0.1337 kW/kg)
