= Florida Airways =

American 1923–1927 airline

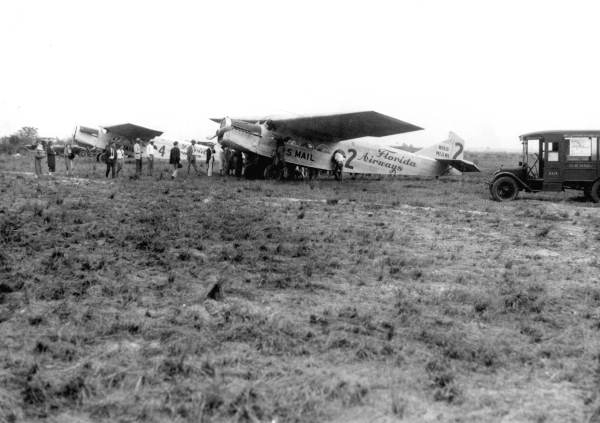
- Founded: 1923; 103 years ago
- Ceased operations: 1927; 99 years ago
- Destinations: Miami, Atlanta
- Key people: Eddie Rickenbacker, Ray Brooks

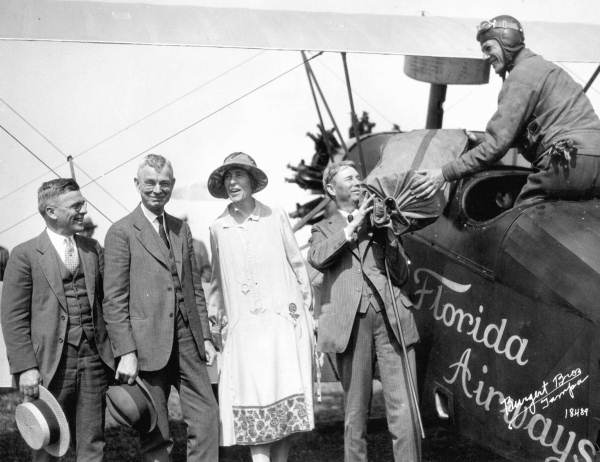
First airmail in Tampa

Florida Airways was an American airline. Founded in part by Eddie Rickenbacker and based in the state of Florida, the airline served the southeastern United States during the mid-1920s.

== History ==
Florida Airways was founded by Eddie Rickenbacker, Reed Chambers, and Virgil Chinea who later claimed "it was the worst investment he ever made". Several outside investors were brought in including Richard F Hoyt, Anne Morgan, Percy Rockefeller, and Henry Ford who bought 3 of his own Stout 2AT's for the venture. The airline started carrier service on Paxon Field at Jacksonville in 1923, and regularly scheduled passenger service on June 1, 1926 beginning with a flight from Tampa to Miami and Jacksonville.

Florida Airways had been a pioneer airline operating on the CAM (Commercial Air Mail) routes that subsidized early air commerce through airmail contracts, securing the CAM-10 route between Miami and Atlanta. On September 15, 1926, its mail delivery on the Tampa-Jacksonville-Atlanta route became the first commercial flight to land at Candler Field, the forerunner to Atlanta International Airport. Passenger revenue was too sparse to solely support the airline, and the number of passengers for 1926 totaled 939. Initially, Florida Airways charged $60 (equivalent to about a $1,100 in 2026 dollars) for a one way ticket to fly from Miami to Jacksonville. In order to increase revenue, wet letters or even bricks with stamps were mailed back and forth on the airline.

By 1926, Florida Airways sought travel to Cuba to keep solvency, but negotiators discovered that Juan Trippe had already negotiated exclusive landing rights in Cuba for Pan American Airways in 1925. The airline ceased operations on 9 June 1927. Two months later, Harold Pitcairn founder of Pitcairn Aviation won the bid for the airline's abandoned Miami-Atlanta airmail contract. Pitcairn Aviation would eventually become a part of Eastern Air Transport, later a part of North American Aviation Corporation, which in turn would become Eastern Airlines.

After Florida Airways stopped service, two of its Stout 2-AT's were purchased by Stout Air Services, which went on to become United Airlines.

== Destinations ==
- Atlanta
- Jacksonville
- Miami

== Fleet ==
The Florida Airways fleet consists of the following aircraft as of 1926

Florida Airlines Fleet
Aircraft	Total	Routes	Notes
Stout 2-AT Pullman	3
Travel Air	2
Curtiss Lark	1		Miss Tallahassee
Stinson Detroiter	1		Miss Atlanta

== Incidents and accidents ==
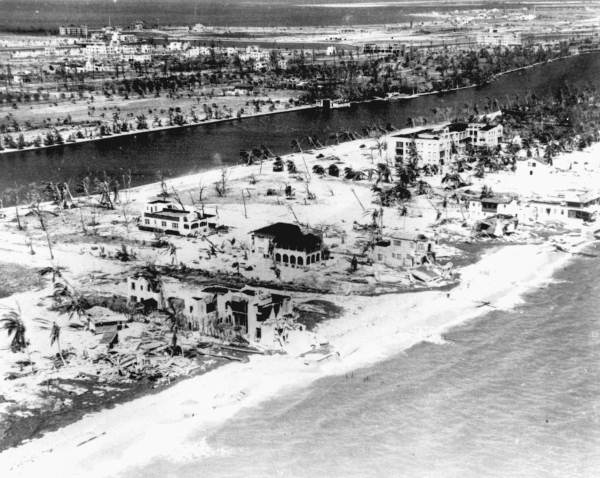
1926 Miami Hurricane

On November 3, 1925 Henry Ford sent off 4 new Stout 2-AT's to Florida with an audience of 5000 spectators from Ford Airport (Dearborn). After a stop in Nashville, Tennessee, the first Stout on takeoff Miss Fort Myers fishtailed on its takeoff run and crashed into Miss Tampa and Miss Miami sparing only Miss St Petersburg. Only three aircraft made it to Florida for initial delivery.

The 1926 Miami hurricane killed 400, and left 50,000 homeless. It blew away a Florida Airways Stout 2-AT Pullman tied down outside.
