= National Air Transport =

United States airline active from 1925 to 1934

IATA	ICAO	Call sign
-	-	-
- Founded: 21 May 1925; 101 years ago
- Ceased operations: 1934; 92 years ago
- Operating bases: Chicago Midway
- Subsidiaries: Stout Air Services
- Fleet size: See Aircraft types operated below
- Parent company: United Aircraft and Transport Corporation

National Air Transport was a large United States airline; in 1930 it was bought by Boeing. The Air Mail Act of 1934 prohibited airlines and manufacturers from being under the same corporate umbrella, so Boeing split into three smaller companies, one of which is United Airlines, which included what had been National Air Transport.

== Formation ==
Clement M. Keys formed North American Aviation in early 1925, for the express purpose of providing organization, finance and inspiration for the development of a large network of airlines, manufacturers and other aviation services, each nurturing the other. Keys contacted Carl B., Fritsche, general manager of the Aircraft Development Corporation of Detroit, with the idea of creating an airline to link Chicago with Detroit and New York City.

To insure a sound base for operations, Keys proposed an initial subscribed share capital of $2 million, many times that of other early airlines. Keys raised $1 million through his New York contacts and Fritsche raised $500,000 from Detroit interests. After further fund raising, the remaining $500,000 was subscribed by the sons of several leading Chicago business men. This enabled National Air Transport Inc. (NAT) to be incorporated in the state of Delaware on 21 May 1925. The total authorized issued share capital was fixed at an unprecedented $10 million.

== Airmail contract bid and commencement of operations ==
Keys and other members of NAT's board realized that an airmail contract would be crucial to the development of the airline, and NAT bid for mail contract CAM 3 from the United States Post Office. This covered the Chicago–Dallas route and was awarded to NAT on 7 November 1925. This was a key link in the US airmail network, connecting two important cities and regions with the transcontinental route through Chicago.

Ten Carrier Pigeon biplane aircraft were built by Curtiss, one of Key's other business interests. These were used to open the NAT airmail service on 12 May 1926 on a route Chicago-Moline-St Joseph-Kansas City-Wichita-Ponca City-Oklahoma City-Dallas.

On 7 May 1930 N.A.T. was acquired by United Aircraft and Transport Corporation, a holding company that already owned several airlines that operated as independent divisions. On 12 September 1930 N.A.T. itself purchased one of these divisions, Stout Air Services, Inc. Stout had purchased Ford Air Transport Service's airmail routes in 1928, and flew Ford Trimotors.

== New York-Chicago mail route ==
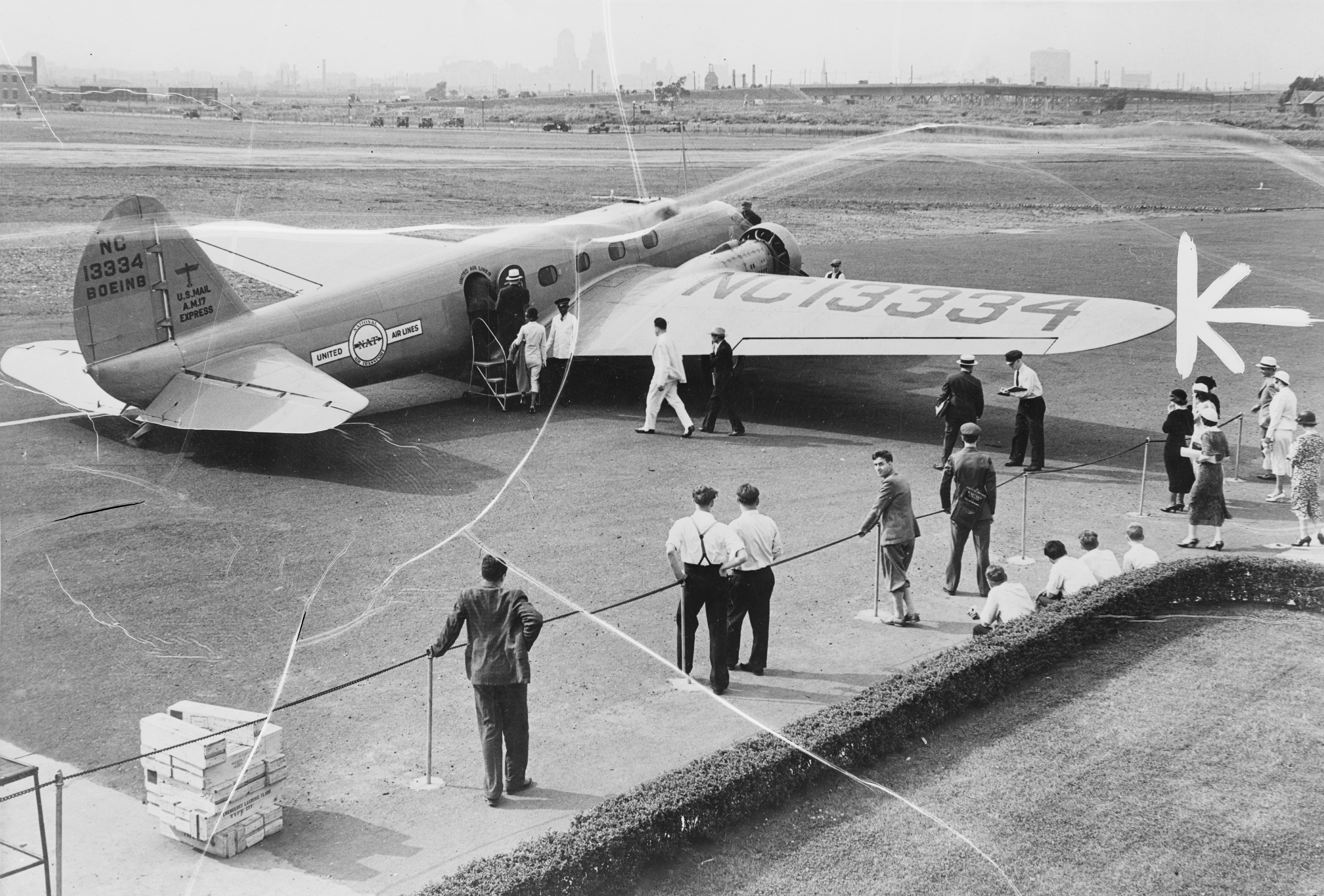
Passengers boarding a National Air Transport-branded Boeing 247D

NAT wished to expand their network and bid for the New York-Chicago airmail route CAM 17. On 2 April 1927 the airline was awarded the contract in competition with three other bidders; the rate was to be $1.24 per pound of airmail carried. 14 pilots were taken on from the Post Office Department and the service over the Allegheny Mountains began 1 September, initially with Curtiss Carrier Pigeons, quickly supplemented by 18 Douglas M-2s taken over from the Post Office. In early 1928 NAT added eight Travel Air 6000s.

NAT passenger flights between New York (Newark) and Chicago began in December 1930, one Ford Trimotor a day each way. Until then NAT had carried occasional passengers on the mail flights to Hadley Field for a $200 one-way fare. One-way fare Newark to Chicago in 1931 was $59.50.

== Aircraft types operated ==
- Curtiss Carrier Pigeon
- Douglas M-2
- Travel Air 5000
- Travel Air 6000
- Ford Trimotor
- Boeing 247D

== See also ==
- Charles Townsend Ludington
- List of defunct airlines of the United States
