= CSC Aircraft Company =

Defunct U.S. aircraft manufacturer

- Company type: Aircraft Manufacturer
- Founded: 1924
- Defunct: 1925
- Fate: Dissolved
- Headquarters: Saginaw, Michigan
- Key people: Walter J. Carr
- Products: Aircraft

CSC Aircraft Company was an American aircraft manufacturer founded to produce early cabin biplanes.

The CSC Aircraft Company was founded by Walter J. Carr, with investors Walter and Edward Savage, and John Coryell. The team developed the Maiden Saginaw cabin biplane aircraft that was more practical for passengers than the contemporary open cockpit planes in the colder climates. The aircraft used a surplus Curtiss OX-5 engine that was underpowered, and resulted in poor performance. The company was soon dissolved, and the founders later tried the concept with a new company, the Paramount Aircraft Corporation.

== Aircraft ==
Summary of aircraft built by CSC Aircraft Company
Model name	First flight	Number built	Type
CSC Maiden Saginaw	1924	1	Cabin Biplane
