= Elinor Smith =

American aviator

- Born: Elinor Regina Patricia Ward; August 17, 1911; New York City, New York, U.S.
- Died: March 19, 2010 (aged 98); Palo Alto, California, U.S.
- Occupation: Aviator
- Spouse: Patrick Sullivan

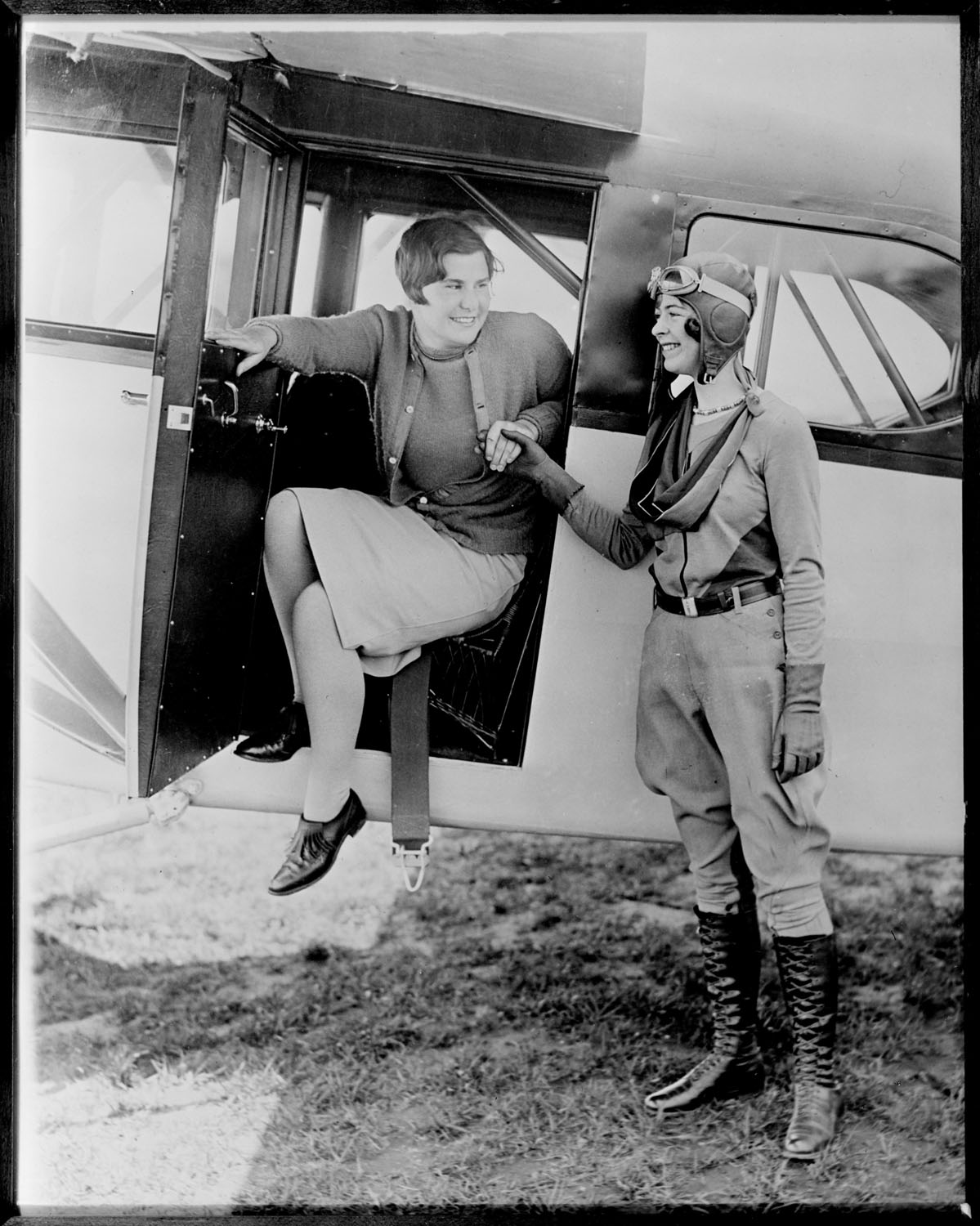
Smith (right) with Helen Hicks around 1928-1930 in Farmingdale, New York

Elinor Smith (August 17, 1911 – March 19, 2010) was a pioneering American aviator, once known as "The Flying Flapper of Freeport". She was the first woman test pilot for both Fairchild and Bellanca (now AviaBellanca). She was the youngest licensed pilot in the world at age 16.

== Early life ==
Smith was born Elinor Regina Patricia Ward (her actor father changed his name to Tom Smith, in order to avoid being mistaken for another performer, thus she became Elinor Smith) in New York City and grew up in Freeport, Long Island, New York. Her mother had been a professional singer before her marriage; her father was a comedian, singer and dancer. He toured extensively (including to Great Britain and France) in the role of the Scarecrow in a stage production of The Wizard of Oz and was a star of the Orpheum Circuit. He wrote his own material for his vaudeville act, and in the 1920s wrote comedy bits for Broadway shows as well.

== Aviation career ==
=== Early flying experience ===
In 1918, at the age of six, along with her brother Joe, she took her first plane ride in a Farman pusher that took off from a potato patch near Hicksville on Long Island. She immediately fell in love with flying, and took numerous rides that summer with the same French pilot, Louis Gaubert. At age 10 she began receiving flying lessons from Clyde Pangborn who tied blocks to the rudder pedals so Elinor's feet could reach. She received further lessons from Frederick Melvin Lund, who piloted her father around the country on the vaudeville circuit and was teaching him to fly as well, and from Bert Acosta. Her father bought a Waco 9 and hired "Red" Devereaux as a pilot and flight instructor for both of them. However, during that time her father directed the instructors to not let her take off or land, because he was concerned for her safety. This prohibition was finally lifted by her mother while her father was out of town, and after ten days of intense instruction from Russ Holderman, she soloed for the first time at age 16. She began taking her father's Waco 9 up to higher altitudes than anyone had ever taken such a plane. (She later wrote in her memoir, "I had no business fooling around up there without oxygen—and I knew it.") Word got around, and it was arranged for her to get a Fédération Aéronautique Internationale (FAI) license and an FAI-certified barograph. Orville Wright finalized her FAI license, and three months after her first solo, she set an official light plane altitude record of 11,889 feet (3,624 m) in the Waco 9. In September 1927, at 16, she became the youngest U.S.-government-licensed pilot on record.

=== Stunt flying under New York bridges ===
To this point, her family had kept publicity to a minimum, to allow her to hone her flying skills without the distraction of public attention. This changed in October 1928; on a dare, she flew a Waco 10 under all four of New York City's East River bridges; according to the Cradle of Aviation Museum, she is the only person to do so. By her own account at the time, she first reconnoitered the route from above the bridges; nonetheless, she had to dodge several ships. Although she did not know it in advance, newsreel crews were there to film her at each bridge; the Curtiss Field regulars had been betting on whether she could really do it, and those who were betting on her side had alerted the media so that there would be clear evidence on film that it was, indeed, her at the controls of the plane. By her own account, the only sanction she received for the unauthorized stunt was a 10-day "grounding" by the city of New York, with Mayor James J. Walker interceding on her behalf to prevent any actual suspension of her license by the United States Department of Commerce. A request for Elinor's autograph accompanied the Department's letter of reprimand. Tom D. Crouch writes that she had her license suspended for 15 days. In any case, the stunt and her devil-may-care attitude made her a celebrity and helped to win her the "Flying Flapper" nickname.

=== Breaking records ===
==== Endurance records ====
Numerous other feats followed close on. Until late 1928, there was no established women's flying endurance record; Smith decided to establish one, but was beaten to it. On December 20, Viola Gentry flew for eight hours, six minutes. As far as Smith was concerned, all that did was to establish a tangible target, one that Red Devereaux said Smith could break "standing on [her] head." However, before Smith could finish her preparations, on January 2, 1929, Evelyn "Bobbi" Trout, flying in California, upped the record to 12 hours. Under FAI rules, endurance records had to be broken by a full hour.

In late January 1929, it became clear that Gentry was ready to have another go at the record. In the depths of a rough New York winter, Smith judged that Roosevelt Field was in no state for a heavily loaded takeoff. With some difficulty, she obtained permission to use the military's nearby Mitchel Field. On January 30, flying an open cockpit Bruner Winkle biplane on a day when the temperature was 0 °F (−18 °C), Smith set a women's solo endurance record of 13½ hours. Her plan was to fly through the night and land in daylight: unbeknownst to those around her, although she had often landed at dusk she had never done a true night landing before. However, the effect of the cold on both her body and that of her aircraft forced her down early. By her own account, she managed to land with a heavy remaining load of fuel only due to the good fortune of being able to follow in Jimmy Doolittle, who had seen her fire her Véry pistol. No one on the ground had seen the flare, so the runway lights had not been turned on. Upon landing she promised herself "never again to display this blend of incompetence and arrogance."

The next day, Gentry crashed on takeoff while attempting to better Smith's achievement; Gentry was unharmed, but her plane was damaged. Bobbi Trout took back the endurance record with a 17-hour flight on February 10–11, but three months later, in April 1929, Smith smashed that record, soloing 26½ hours in a Bellanca CH monoplane. That flight also made her the first woman ever to pilot such a large and powerful aircraft.

==== Speed record ====
The following month she set a woman's world speed record of 190.8 miles per hour (307.1 km/h) in a Curtiss military aircraft. In June 1929 the parachute-maker Irving Parachute Company, hired her to tour the United States, flying a Bellanca Pacemaker on a 6,000-mile (9,700 km) tour, making the 18-year-old Smith the first female Executive Pilot. On this tour, at the air races in Cleveland, Ohio, she was the pilot for an unprecedented seven-man parachute drop.

==== Endurance with mid-air refueling ====
Also in 1929, flying out of Metropolitan Airport (now Van Nuys Airport) in Los Angeles, she and Bobbi Trout (who functioned as co-pilot) set the first official women's record for endurance with mid-air refueling. They were aloft 42½ hours in a Sunbeam biplane powered by a 300-horsepower J-6 Wright engine. Smith did the contact flying while Trout handled the fueling hoses. Their refueling craft, a Curtiss Pigeon with a Liberty L-12 engine, was piloted by Paul Whittier with Pete Reinhart handling the hose. Smith and Trout were hoping for a record of at least 100 hours, and shooting for 164 hours (nearly a week), but this was not to be. The two craft were not terribly well suited to the task at hand. The Pigeon was chosen for its large cargo capacity to carry fuel, but it was an outdated aircraft with a temperamental engine for which spare parts were not easily obtained. In refueling position, the Pigeon's pilot could not see the Sunbeam at all, so there was no way to signal about any engine problems that would mean sudden loss of altitude. The Sunbeam was not a notably stable aircraft; in Smith's words, "it had to be flown every single minute with the concentration of a test flight." Furthermore, the two craft were mismatched in terms of velocity: whenever they were refueling, the Pigeon had to fly near its top speed while the Sunbeam slowed down to just above its stalling speed.

The first attempt at the record nearly ended in disaster around the 12-hour mark. During refueling near Catalina Island, sudden turbulence wrested the hose from Trout's hands, covering her in airplane fuel, while at the other end of the hose Reinhart was left bleeding from cuts. Both planes made it successfully back to Metropolitan Airport, and no one was seriously hurt. A series of additional attempts lasted between 10 and 18 hours; the weak link each time was keeping the Pigeon's engine running. Finally, in late November 1929, with the rainy season approaching, enough of the right factors fell into place to allow them to set a meaningful record, albeit a more modest one than they hoped for. The Sunbeam flew better than usual; the Pigeon's Liberty engine made it through 36 hours, although when it did fail it was dramatic, and forced the refueling craft into an emergency landing with its hose trailing. Smith and Trout flew the Sunbeam nearly dry, stretching their flight out to exactly 42½ hours.

==== Altitude record ====
In March 1930 she added almost 1 mile (1.6 km) to the world altitude record, flying to a height of 27,419 feet (8,357 m). Her articulate performance in an NBC broadcast interview after that flight won her a position as a broadcaster covering the world of aviation, including live broadcasts from air shows and interviews with other prominent aviators. In May 1930, still before her 19th birthday, she became the youngest pilot ever granted a Transport License by the U.S. Department of Commerce. In October 1930 a poll of licensed pilots selected her as the "Best Woman Pilot in America".

In March 1931, flying out of Roosevelt Field on Long Island, she attempted to set the world altitude record, again flying a 6-seater Bellanca with a turbocharged 575 hp P&W Wasp R-1340-23 on two attempts. Her altitude of 32,576 feet (9,929 m) on the second flight gave her back the women's record, and demonstrated the over-the-weather capability of the Bellanca, but fell just short of the overall world record. The first flight nearly ended in calamity. At 26,000 feet (7,900 m) the engine died, and as she was trying to restart it, she lost consciousness (unbeknownst to her, the lead-encased oxygen bottle that she was wearing around her neck had cracked, allowing its content to leak out). The fuel line had probably frozen, and after she lost consciousness the now-powerless airplane went into a steep dive. Smith regained consciousness and began a cautious pullout at about 6,000 feet (1,800 m), and managed to guide the plane to an open spot in a housing development, nosing it over during the landing. For the second attempt ten days later, six upper wing ribs were replaced, the bent propeller was straightened, and another engine was installed (since the company was not sure why the first engine had quit). She ascended to 34,800 feet indicated on her altimeter. However, the barograph cylinder on her recording instrument had stuck at 28,000 feet, destroying hope of an official world's record.

=== Later years ===
The Great Depression scrubbed her hopes of a non-stop solo trans-Atlantic flight in a Lockheed Vega, though she continued for several years to be a prominent stunt flyer, performing numerous fund-raisers for the homeless and needy. In 1934, Smith became the third person—and first woman—to be pictured on a Wheaties box.

Smith married New York State legislator and attorney Patrick H. Sullivan, nephew of Tammany leader Timothy "Big Tim" Sullivan. She kept flying for a while after their 1933 marriage, but once she had a child she retired from flying and spent over 20 years as a suburban housewife, ultimately bearing and raising four children.

Sullivan died in 1956, and Smith returned to the air. Her membership in the Air Force Association allowed her to pilot the Lockheed T-33 jet trainer and to take up C-119s for paratroop maneuvers. In March 2000 at the Ames Research Center, Moffett Federal Airfield, California, as the pilot with an all-woman crew, she took on NASA's Space Shuttle vertical motion simulator, and became the oldest pilot to succeed in a simulated shuttle landing. In April 2001, at the age of 89, she flew an experimental C33 Raytheon AGATE, Beech Bonanza at Langley Air Force Base, Virginia. In 2001, she received the Elder Statesman Award from the National Aeronautic Association.

Smith died on March 19, 2010, in Palo Alto, California.

== Bibliography ==
- Smith, Elinor (1981). Aviatrix. Harcourt Brace Jovanovich. ISBN 0-15-110372-0.
