= Travel Air 5000 =

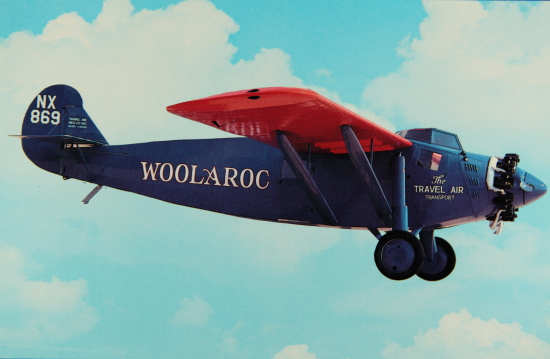

General information
- Type: Airliner and Racer
- National origin: United States of America
- Manufacturer: Travel Air Manufacturing Company
- Designer: Lloyd Stearman and Clyde Cessna and Walter Beech
- Primary user: National Air Transport
- Number built: 13

History
- First flight: March 1926
- Variant: Travel Air 6000

The Travel Air 5000 was an early high-wing monoplane airliner and racing monoplane designed by Clyde Cessna and is chiefly remembered for being the winner of the disastrous Dole Air Race from California to Hawaii.

== Design and development ==
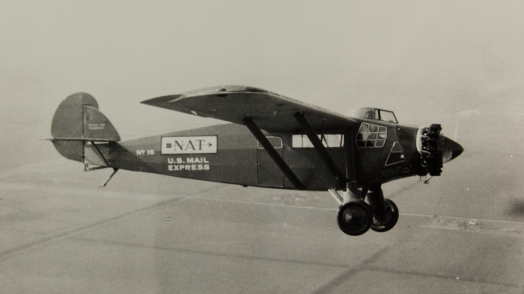
Travel Air 5000 with National Air Transport in flight

Cessna broke away from traditional biplane development with a monoplane in 1926. The first prototype was a 5-passenger aircraft with a 110 hp (82 kW) Anzani engine. The aircraft was modified by Cessna, Lloyd Stearman, and Walter Beech that fall. A second aircraft was built that December, and featured a Wright J-4 Whirlwind as the Travel Air 5000. National Air Transport awarded Travel Air a contract to produce the aircraft with the larger Wright J-5C engine and seating for four passengers. Eight aircraft were built for air mail contract and passenger service.

The Travel Air 5000 was a high-wing monoplane with conventional landing gear. The fuselage was constructed of welded steel tubing. The cockpit was fully enclosed in a canopy above the forward fuselage, but at least one model had the canopy omitted. The Dole racers were modified with 425-gallon fuselage fuel tanks and earth inductor compasses.

== Operational history ==
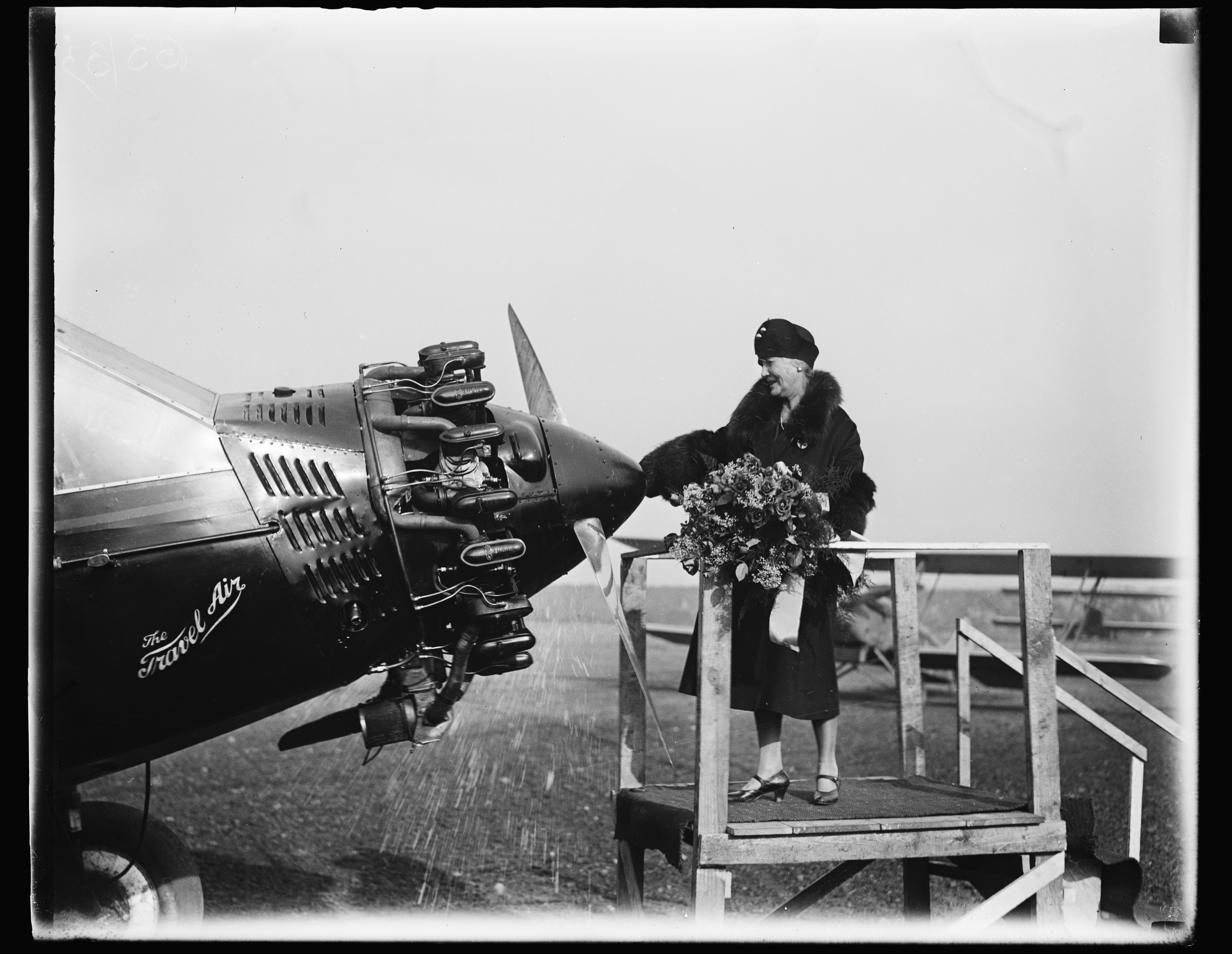
Travel Air 5000 at Hoover Field being christened by Harry Stewart New's wife before an unsuccessful world endurance record, 1928

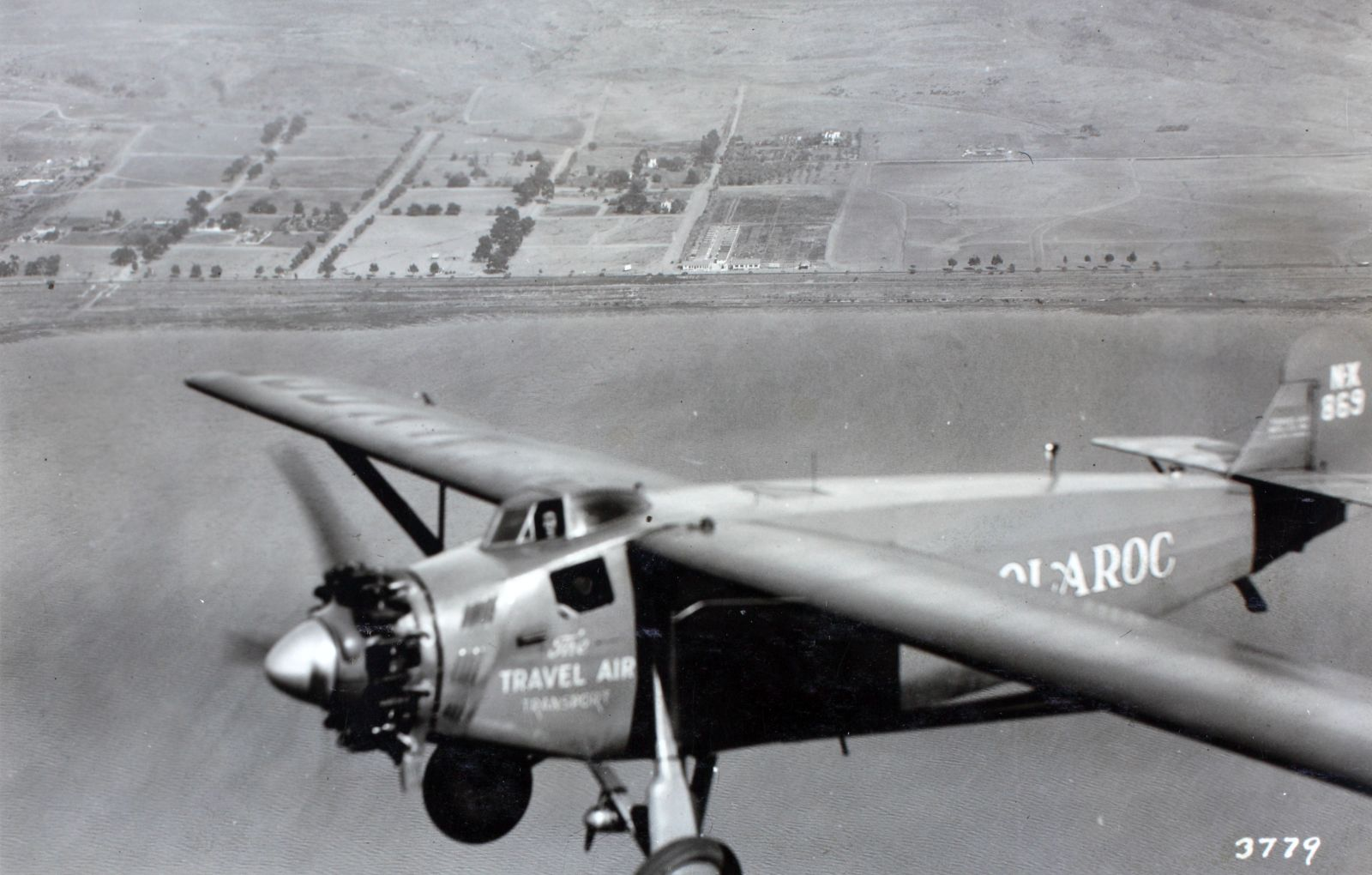
Woolaroc, winner of ill-fated Dole Air Race in flight

The prototype Travel Air 5000, s/n 160 "The Spirit of Oakland" was originally sold to Pacific Air Transport in April 1927 and then resold to Ernest Smith for a 14 July flight from Oakland, California, to Molokai, Hawaii, where it crashed on landing becoming the second aircraft to complete a trans-pacific flight, and the first civilian aircraft to do so.

Orders placed in June 1927 for two custom-built Travel Air model 5000 aircraft to compete in the Oakland, California, to Honolulu, Hawaii, Dole Air Race. Two teams placed $5000 deposits, and were later sponsored by Frank Phillips of Phillips Petroleum to promote their "Nu-Aviation" fuel. The "Oklahoma" was forced to return to land, while the "Woolaroc" completed the flight and won.

Woolaroc was later modified late in 1928 for an unsuccessful transcontinental speed record attempt.

National Air Transport and Royal Airways used the model 5000 in revenue service. Production of the first four airliners was in the West Douglas plant. On 30 June 1927 production of two Modified model 5000's started in the newly constructed East Central factory.

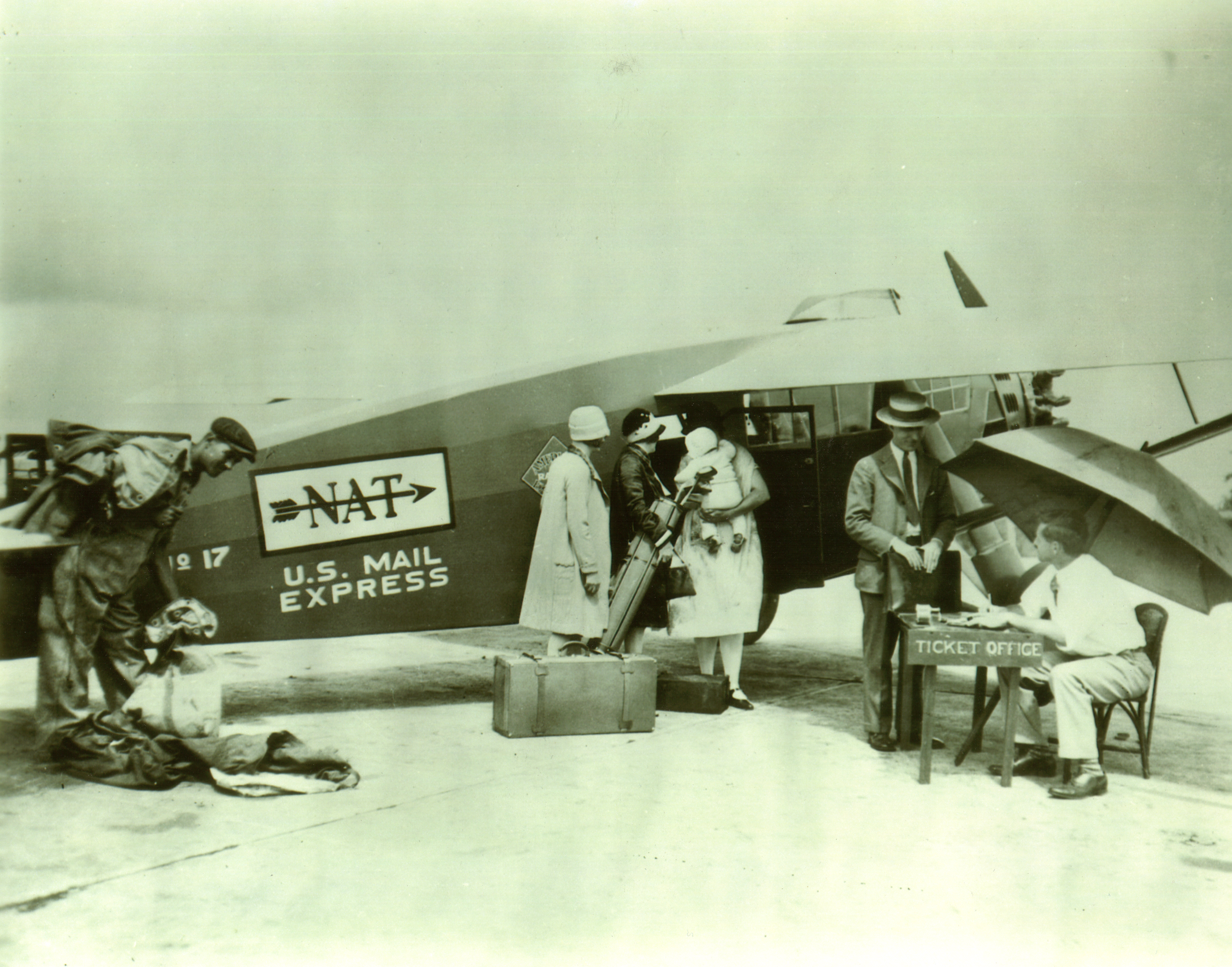
Travel Air 5000 flying as National Air Transport #17

== Operators ==
- National Air Transport
- Pacific Air Transport
- Royal Airways

== Surviving aircraft ==
The Travel Air 5000 "Woolaroc" which won the Dole Race is on display at the Woolaroc Museum near Bartlesville, Oklahoma.

The Travel Air 5000 flying as National Air Transport's #17 aircraft on display at the former Fort Worth Star Telegram headquarters building in downtown Fort Worth, Texas. In 1927, this aircraft was the first to bring passengers and mail in to Dallas & Fort Worth. National Air Transport presented the aircraft to Amon Carter as a gift in 1931. The aircraft was later restored by Harry Hansen of Hamilton, Texas and Cowtown Aerocrafters of Justin, Texas.

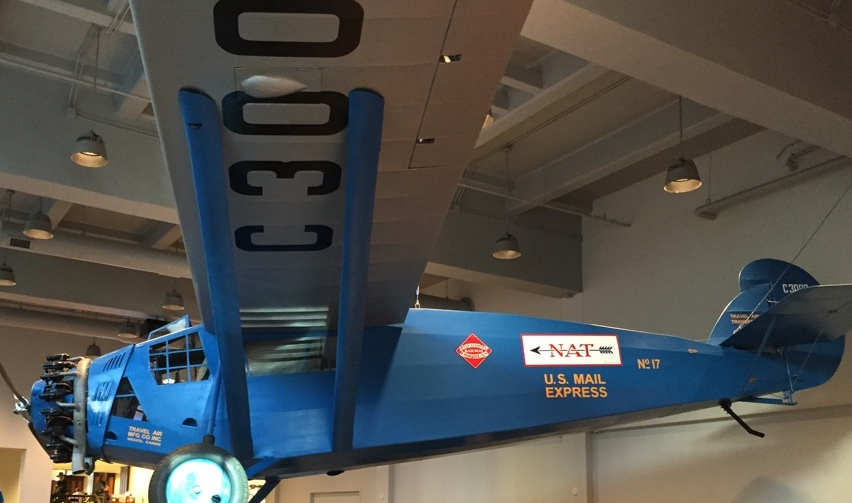
Travel Air 5000, National Air Transport #17

== Specifications (Travel Air 5000) ==
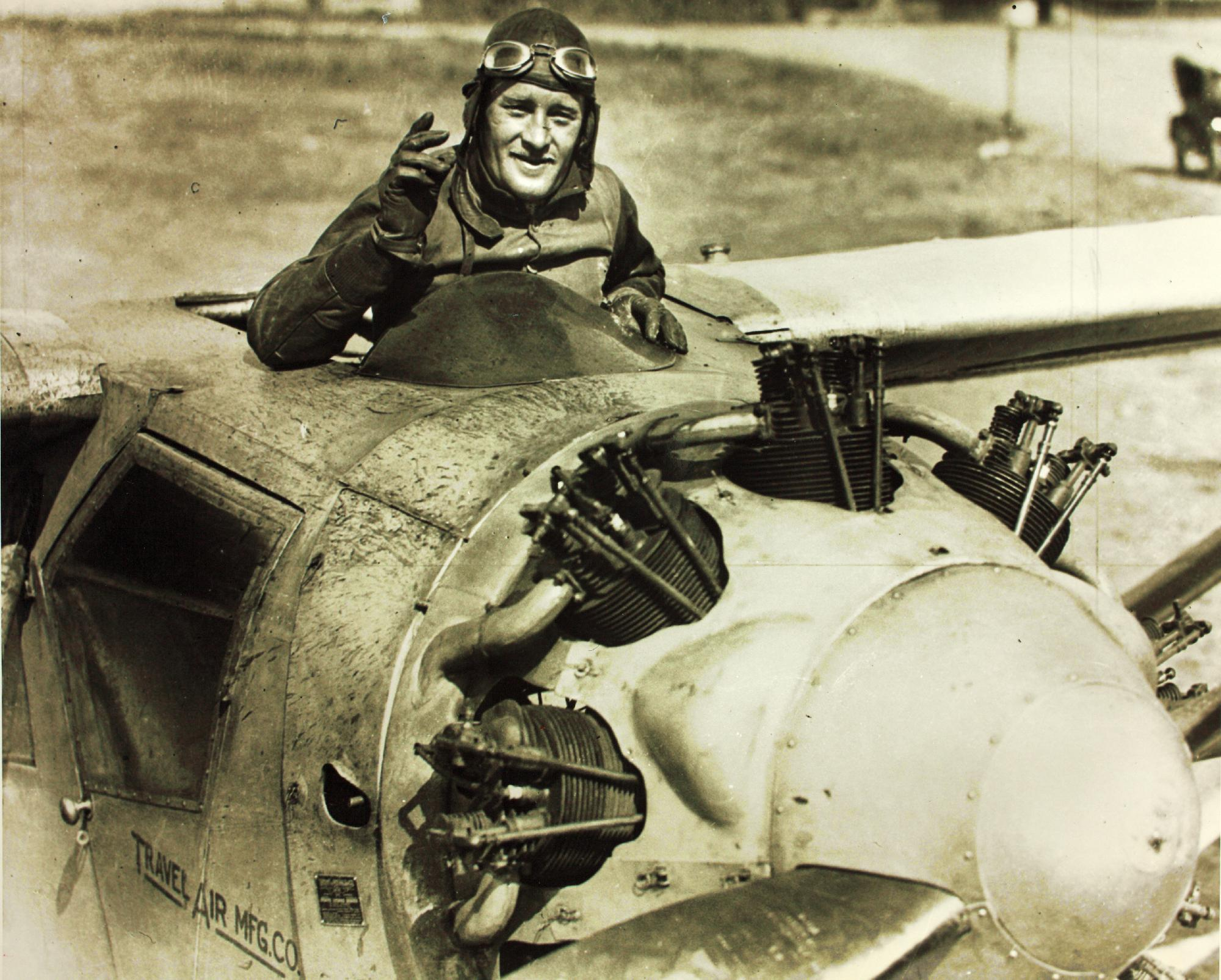
Pilot in prototype Travel Air 5000

Data from Travel Air Restorers Association

General characteristics

- Capacity: 4 passengers
- Length: 30 ft 5 in (9.27 m)
- Wingspan: 51 ft 7 in (15.72 m)
- Height: 8 ft 5 in (2.57 m)
- Wing area: 312 sq ft (29.0 m^{2})
- Airfoil: M6
- Empty weight: 2,160 lb (980 kg)
- Gross weight: 3,600 lb (1,633 kg)
- Fuel capacity: 75 US gallons or 425 US gallons for Dole Racers
- Powerplant: 1 × Wright J-5 Whirlwind 9-cylinder radial, 220 hp (164 kW)

Performance

- Maximum speed: 107 kn (123 mph, 198 km/h)
- Cruise speed: 94 kn (108 mph, 174 km/h)
- Stall speed: 48 kn (55 mph, 89 km/h)
- Service ceiling: 13,600 ft (4,100 m)
- Rate of climb: 750 ft/min (3.8 m/s)

== Bibliography ==
- Goebel, Arthur C (1929). Art Goebel's own story (PDF). United States: CafePress.com (2007 reprint). ASIN B0008BKSWQ.
- Osborn, Earl D., ed. (10 October 1927). "The Travel Air Transport Monoplane". Aviation. New York: Aviation Publishing Corp. pp. 878–880.
- Pelletier, A. J. (1995). Beech Aircraft and their Predecessors. London: Putnam. ISBN 978-0851778631.
- Phillips, Ed (Spring 1985). "Woolaroc!". AAHS Journal.
- Scheppler, R.H. "Travel Air 5000 "Woolaroc"". Aero Modeller. Aircraft described number 213. pp. 221–223 & 227.
- Travel Air Manufacturing Company, ed. (September 1927). ""Travel Air" Commercial Airplane - Type 5000". Aircraft Circulars, National Advisory Committee for Aeronautics No.55. Washington D.C.
