= Curtiss Model 41 Lark =

Curtiss Lark
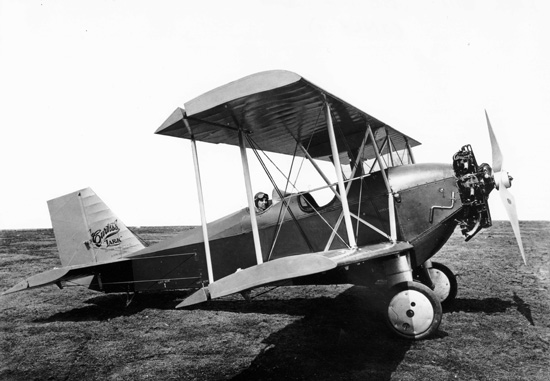

General information
- Type: Biplane
- National origin: United States of America
- Manufacturer: Curtiss Aeroplane and Motor Company
- Number built: 3

History
- Introduction date: 1925
- Developed from: Curtiss Carrier Pigeon

The Curtiss Model 41 Lark was a commercial biplane manufactured by Curtiss Aeroplane and Motor Company that was used by pioneering airmail, airline and bush pilots in the 1920s.

== Development ==
The biplane was based on the Curtiss Carrier Pigeon, a purpose-built aircraft for airmail operations. The Lark also had a longer-span lower wing, similar to the Carrier Pigeon. Some models were converted to floatplane configuration with a central mounted pontoon and wing-mounted floats.

The biplane was made of welded tube with fabric covering. It was available with three engine choices, the Curtiss C-6, the Wright J-4 Whirlwind, and the Wright-Hisso E. All four wing panels were interchangeable, giving the aircraft its unusual longer lower wings.

A 200 hp Wright J-4 variant was tested for the United States Navy. This installation proved superior in performance to the Curtiss engined model. This version eventually became the basis for the Curtiss Fledgling series of aircraft.

== Operational history ==
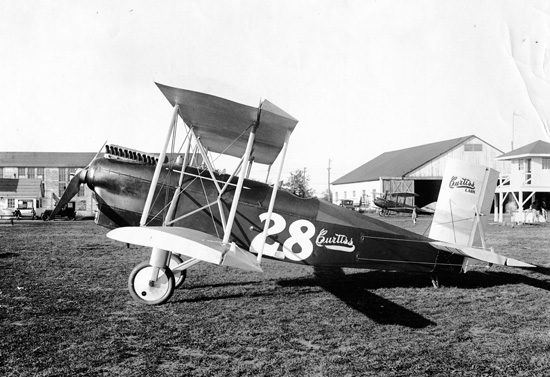
Curtiss Lark at the 1925 National Air Races

Patrica Airways operated a Lark for early bushplane operations. The aircraft flew with floats in warm weather, and skis in the winter. The aircraft was pressed into service as an early hearse once, with the cargo needing to be seated upside down in the open seat and secured with haywire.

Florida Airways operated a Curtiss Lark Miss Tallahassee on its CAM-10 U.S. airmail route between Miami and Atlanta. The aircraft was bought to take the place of two lost Stout 2-AT Pullman aircraft that could not operate out of the poorly prepared airstrips.

Colonial Air Transport owned a Curtiss Lark which was one of the first aircraft to be registered using the new Underwriters Laboratories all-letter system (1921 to 1923). This Lark, registered as N-AABC, was used on the CAM-1 U.S. airmail route.

== Specifications (Curtiss C-6 engine) ==
Data from Curtiss Aircraft 1907 - 1947

General characteristics

- Crew: one
- Capacity: three passengers
- Length: 22 ft 2.5 in (6.769 m)
- Wingspan: 30 ft 7.5 in (9.335 m)
- Height: 8 ft 11 in (2.72 m)
- Wing area: 264.3 sq ft (24.55 m^{2})
- Empty weight: 1,579 lb (716 kg)
- Gross weight: 2,708 lb (1,228 kg)
- Powerplant: 1 × Curtiss C-6 6-cyl water-cooled in-line piston engine, 160 hp (120 kW)

Performance

- Maximum speed: 99 kn (114 mph, 183 km/h)
- Cruise speed: 84 kn (97 mph, 156 km/h)
- Range: 380 nmi (440 mi, 710 km)
- Ferry range: 330 nmi (380 mi, 610 km)
- Service ceiling: 12,500 ft (3,800 m)
- Rate of climb: 860 ft/min (4.4 m/s)
