= CSC Maiden Saginaw =

Maiden Saginaw

General information
- Type: Cabin Monoplane
- National origin: United States of America
- Manufacturer: CSC Aircraft Company
- Designer: Walter J. Carr

History
- First flight: May 1925

The Maiden Saginaw was the only aircraft built by the fledgling CSC Aircraft Company.

== Design and development ==
In 1924 Walter J. Carr found investors Walter Savage, Edward Savage and John Coryell willing to put money into a new enclosed cabin aircraft.

The Maiden Saginaw was a cantilever high-wing cabin monoplane with conventional landing gear with dual wheels and a 100 hp (75 kW) OXX-6 Engine.

== Operational history ==
The Maiden Saginaw suffered from nearly zero forward visibility and an underpowered engine for its size. The prototype flew in May 1925 and did not win over investors. The product was later scrapped.

== Specifications (Maiden Saginaw) ==
Data from Skyways

General characteristics

- Crew: 1
- Capacity: 2
- Wingspan: 42 ft (13 m)
- Gross weight: 1,660 lb (753 kg)
- Powerplant: 1 × Curtiss OXX-6 , 100 hp (75 kW)
