= Curtiss Carrier Pigeon =

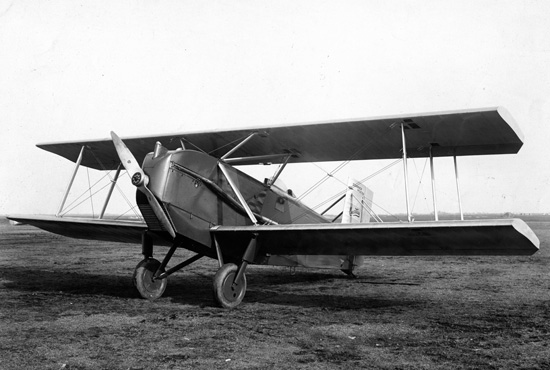

General information
- Type: Mail aircraft
- National origin: United States
- Manufacturer: Curtiss Aeroplane and Motor Company
- Primary user: U.S. Airmail

History
- First flight: 1925
- Variant: Curtiss Lark

The Curtiss Carrier Pigeon was an American mail plane of the 1920s. A single-engined biplane designed and built to replace World War I surplus aircraft such as the DH-4, the Carrier Pigeon was one of the first aircraft designed specifically for U.S. Airmail service.

== Design ==
In 1925 the U.S. Postal Service felt they had excellent operational service with converted Airco D.H.4 biplanes. The eight-year-old designs were considered antiquated by this time, however, and a modern purpose-built machine was desired. While most manufacturers started to build new generation passenger aircraft with mail cargo capability, the Curtiss Carrier Pigeon was the first clean-sheet design specifically made for U.S. air-mail service. The aircraft was intended to be sold directly to the Postal Service, but new legislation that opened up outside contracts brought on a slew of competing models.

The Carrier Pigeon was drawn up to meet or exceed the original postal specifications. Strength, serviceability, and ease of maintenance were the three core design criteria. It was intended to provide service on the nighttime runs between Chicago and New York, with only one stop. The plane was built to take advantage of the powerful and plentiful 400 hp Liberty L-12 engine to meet Postal specifications. Up to 40,000 airmail letters could be carried in the 1,000 lb capacity cargo hold.

The fuselage was a welded steel tube frame covered in fabric. The upper and lower wings were interchangeable and used solid, unspliced spruce spars. The rudder, ailerons, and elevators were also interchangeable, which reduced spares counts. The hinges used heavy replaceable bronze pins to reduce wear.

The watertight cargo hold was at the center of gravity so the aircraft could accommodate a range of loads without affecting the balance. The landing gear used rubber doughnut suspension. The fuel tank could be jettisoned in case of an emergency. A seven quart fire extinguisher was plumbed to the engine compartment for suppression of inflight fires. The pilot could choose between wheel or stick control based on his preference.

== Operational history ==
A prototype Curtiss Carrier Pigeon flown by Charles S. (Casey) Jones placed 7th in the 1925 Edsel B. Ford Reliability Tour. Out of 17 starters, 11 aircraft including the Carrier Pigeon completed with a perfect score, netting a $350 prize. Henry Ford waited at the finish line to greet the winners of the 1,900 mile endurance test.

The Carrier Pigeon was used by National Air Transport Inc. At the time, both Curtiss and NAT were owned and controlled by Clement Keys. Ten Carrier Pigeons were put into service with 35 surplus Liberty engine spares. NAT used the Carrier Pigeon for the Contract Air Mail CAM-3 (Chicago-Dallas) route. The first recorded service was on May 12, 1926 with The route between Chicago, Illinois and Dallas, Texas. Stops were scheduled in Moline, Illinois, Saint Joseph, Missouri, Kansas City, Missouri, Wichita, Kansas, Oklahoma City, Oklahoma and Fort Worth, Texas. The maiden flight was piloted by D A Askew, R L Dobie, R H Fatt, Lawrence H Garrison, P E Johnson, H L Kindred and Edmund Matucha. These pilots logged 776,351 miles of flight in the first year without an accident or loss of any mail.

NAT invested $10 million competing for the nighttime Chicago to New York route (CAM 17). NAT started service on September 1, 1927 using Carrier Pigeons from CAM-3. These planes flew the early lighted airway from Cheyenne to Chicago, and recently extended to New York. The path over the Allegheny Mountains was referred to as the "Hell Stretch". Early in 1929, NAT acquired seven 625 hp Curtiss Falcons, these replaced the smaller Carrier Pigeons. D. A. Askew flew the final Carrier Pigeon flight. He had flown this same aircraft on the inaugural CAM No. 3 flight. On February 9, 1934, the Post Office cancelled all airmail contracts on suspicion that the mail carrying contracts had been awarded through collusion during the previous administration.

One fatal airmail crash was recorded in a Carrier Pigeon. Arthur R. Smith was killed in aircraft #602 when he hit trees near Montpelier, Ohio, en route to Chicago.

=== Use as a tanker aircraft ===
On November 27, 1929, Evelyn "Bobbi" Trout and Elinor Smith took off from Metropolitan Airport in a Commercial Sunbeam biplane in an attempt to set an official record for a refueled endurance flight by women. A Carrier Pigeon was used as the tanker aircraft, which refueled the Sunbeam 3 1/2 times. The Sunbeam was to be refueled in early morning and before sunset. Refueling went well. With shifts of four hours each, two days passed. By Thanksgiving Day, they had been up for 39 hours. While refueling, the Carrier Pigeon began trailing black smoke. Trout quickly tossed the fueling hose over the side as Smith maneuvered away from the ailing Carrier Pigeon. It landed, and the fliers emerged safely.

== Variants ==
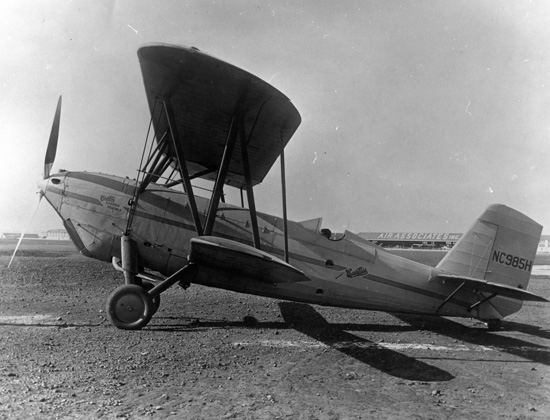
The Carrier Pigeon 2.

- The Carrier Pigeon 2 was built by the Carrier Pigeon Co of Buffalo, New York in 1929. This was a larger and modernized version of its predecessor with a 600 hp geared Curtiss Conqueror and a three-blade prop.
- The Curtiss Lark model 41 was the follow-on aircraft, employing four interchangeable wing panels.

== Specifications (Curtiss Model 40 - Carrier Pigeon I) ==
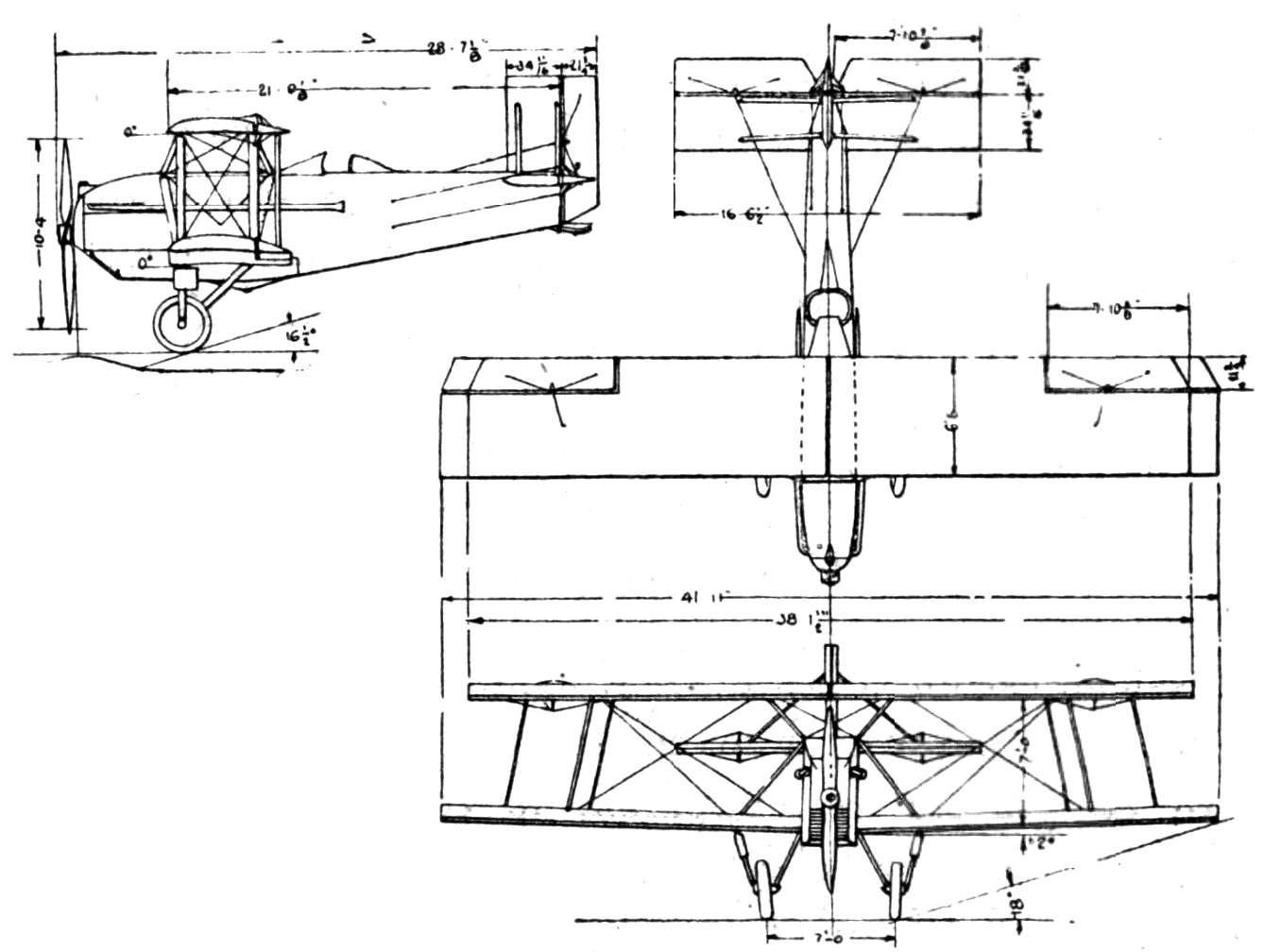
Curtiss Carrier Pigeon 3-view drawing from L'Aéronautique March,1927

Data from Curtiss Aircraft 1907–1947

General characteristics

- Crew: one
- Capacity: 1,000 lb (450 kg) cargo
- Length: 28 ft 9.5 in (8.776 m)
- Wingspan: 41 ft 11 in (12.78 m)
- Height: 12 ft 1 in (3.68 m)
- Wing area: 505 sq ft (46.9 m^{2})
- Airfoil: U.S.A.27
- Empty weight: 3,603 lb (1,634 kg)
- Gross weight: 4,900 lb (2,223 kg)
- Max takeoff weight: 5,620 lb (2,549 kg)
- Powerplant: 1 × Liberty L-12 water-cooled V12 engine, 400 hp (300 kW)

Performance

- Maximum speed: 109 kn (125 mph, 201 km/h)
- Cruise speed: 91 kn (105 mph, 169 km/h)
- Stall speed: 43 kn (50 mph, 80 km/h)
- Range: 456 nmi (525 mi, 845 km)
- Service ceiling: 16,700 ft (5,100 m)
- Rate of climb: 800 ft/min (4.1 m/s)

== See also ==
Aircraft of comparable role, configuration, and era

- Aeromarine AM-1
