= Colonial Air Transport =

1926–1930 American airline

- Founded: 1926; 100 years ago
- Ceased operations: 1929; 97 years ago
- Headquarters: New York
- Key people: Juan Trippe

Colonial Air Transport was an early airline that flew between New York City and Boston, Massachusetts.

== History ==
It was established as Bee Line on 16 March 1923 and operated from Naugatuck, Connecticut; in 1926, the airline was re-organised in New York City by Juan Trippe.

Colonial acquired rights to fly the early U.S. air mail commercial route CAM-1, with the first flight held on July 26, 1926.

On April 15 1929, Colonial started passenger service between New York City and Boston, Massachusetts.

In May 1929, Avco acquired Colonial.

== Fleet ==
The Colonial Air Transport fleet consisted of the following aircraft as of 1926:

Colonial Airlines Fleet
Aircraft	Total	Routes	Notes
Fokker Universal	2	New York – Boston	
Fokker F.VII	2	New York – Boston	
Curtiss Lark	1	New York – Boston	

== See also ==
- List of defunct airlines of the United States
