= Paramount Cabinaire =

Cabinaire
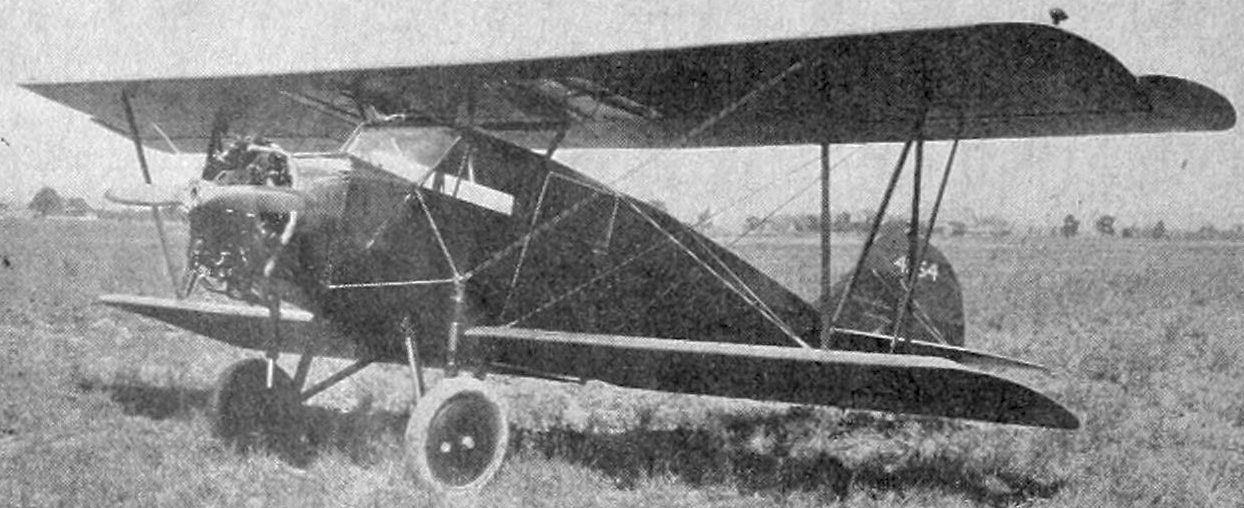
- Cabinaire 110

General information
- Type: Cabin biplane
- National origin: United States of America
- Manufacturer: Paramount Aircraft Corporation
- Designer: Walter J. Carr
- Number built: 8

History
- Introduction date: 1929 National Aircraft Show
- First flight: 1928
- Developed from: Travel Air 2000

The Paramount Cabinaire was a 1920s designed cabin biplane, designed by Walter J. Carr and produced by the Paramount Aircraft Corporation. Only eight were completed before production ceased.

== Design and development ==
Following the failure of Walter J. Carr's first aircraft company, the CSC Aircraft Company, Carr worked as a tester for the new Warner Scarab radial engines. Carr flew with Scarabs on a Travel Air 2000, and later cannibalized the test aircraft to produce the first Cabinaire aircraft design.

The prototype Cabinaire was formed around a welded steel tube Travel Air 2000 fuselage modified for an enclosed cabin. A new center section of wing was added and Travel air wings were reinstalled onto the center sections. The biplane aircraft featured a radial engine, and conventional landing gear. The upper wing was mounted several inches above the enclosed cabin. The entire plane was fabric covered with wooden wing spars and ribs. The upscale cabin used two individual upholstered wicker seats in the front and a wicker bench seat for passengers. The interior used velour finishing, nickel plating, mohair rugs, mahogany panels and roll-down windows.

Prototype #2 was made from parts of the first. Each production model differed slightly from each other with choices of engines, and landing gear and aileron improvements.

== Operational history ==
In 1929, Viola Gentry and Jack Ashcroft attempted an endurance record for flight with aerial refueling in a modified Cabinaire SN#5 named The Answer. The name was chosen in response to the Army aircraft that had completed previous endurance records, the Question Mark. The aircraft had a 55-gallon cabin tank, and 21 gallon wing tanks installed for the attempt. The Answer crew was unable to refuel after the first ten hours of flight due to fog and crashed 28 June 1929, killing Ashcroft. Carr had been the original choice of co-pilot, but had to pass on the opportunity when struck with pneumonia.

In 1930, a Cabinaire was entered in the 4814 mile long Ford National Reliability Air Tour, placing 15th out of 18. The same aircraft has been restored and was still flown in 2011.

== Variants ==
Cabinaire 110
110 hp (82 kW) Warner Radial SN#1-6
Cabinaire 165
165 hp (123 kW) Wright J-6 SN#7
Cabinaire A-70
165 hp (123 kW) - Originally, SN#3 flown as an aerial survey aircraft, it was rebuilt to meet ATC requirements, with a new engine, becoming SN#9.

== Specifications (Paramount Cabinaire 165) ==
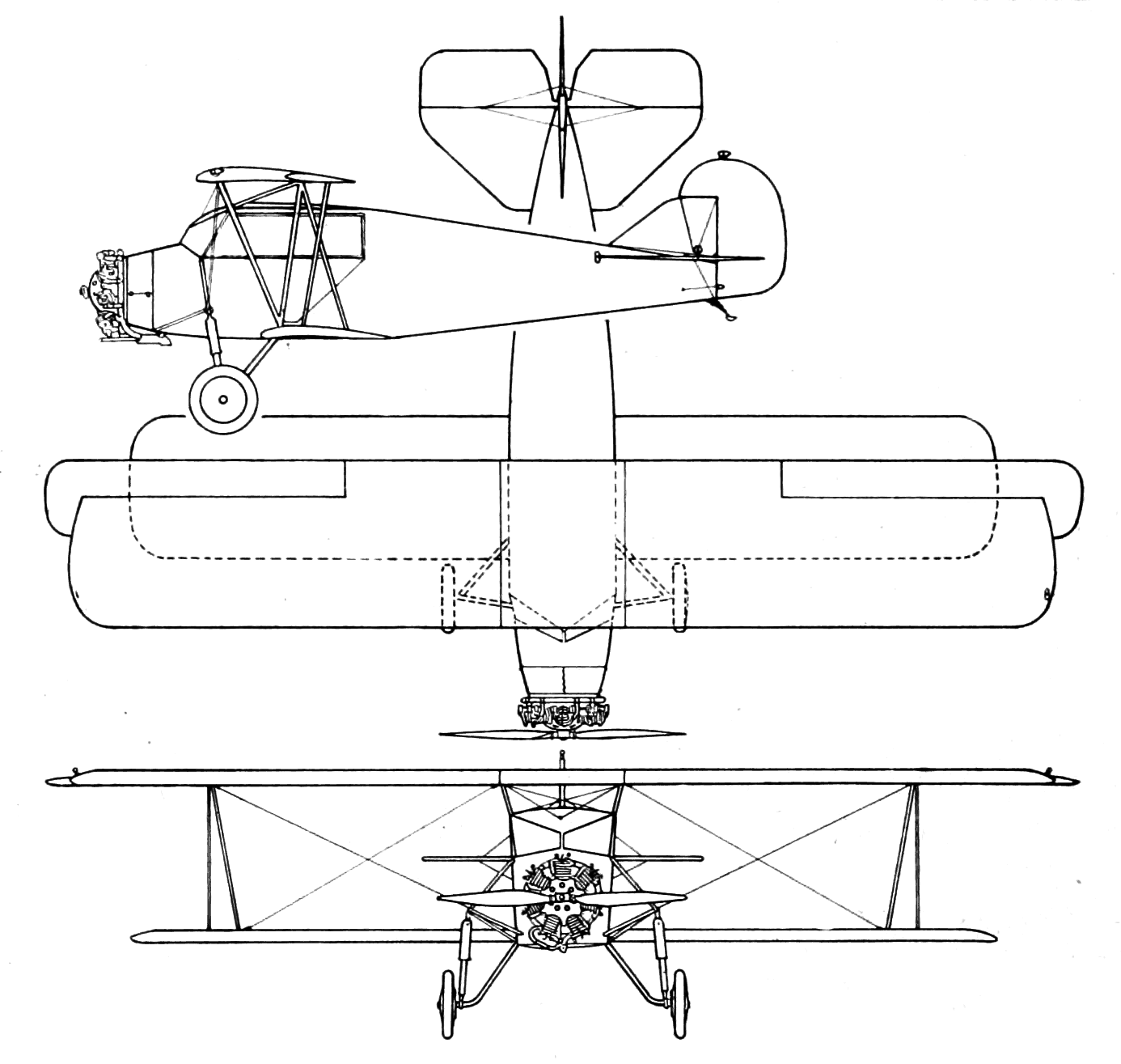
Paramount Cabinaire 110 3-view drawing from Aero Digest February 1929

Data from Skyways, FAA, Popular Aviation

General characteristics

- Crew: one
- Capacity: three
- Length: 24 ft 7 in (7.49 m)
- Upper wingspan: 33 ft 2 in (10.11 m)
- Lower wingspan: 29 ft (8.8 m)
- Height: 9 ft (2.7 m)
- Wing area: 309 sq ft (28.7 m^{2})
- Empty weight: 1,620 lb (735 kg)
- Gross weight: 2,630 lb (1,193 kg)
- Fuel capacity: 50 U.S. gallons (190 L; 42 imp gal)
- Powerplant: 1 × Wright R-540 radial engine, 175 hp (130 kW)

Performance

- Maximum speed: 100 kn (120 mph, 190 km/h)
- Cruise speed: 90 kn (103 mph, 166 km/h)
- Stall speed: 35 kn (40 mph, 64 km/h)
- Range: 350 nmi (400 mi, 640 km)
- Service ceiling: 12,000 ft (3,700 m)
- Rate of climb: 800 ft/min (4.1 m/s)

== See also ==
Aircraft of comparable role, configuration, and era

- Stinson Detroiter
