= Stout Air Services =

American airline

- Founded: 1925; 100 years ago
- Ceased operations: 1930; 95 years ago Purchased by National Air Transport
- Parent company: United Aircraft and Transport Corporation
- Key people: William Bushnell Stout

Stout Air Services was an airline based in the United States. Stout Air Services was the first regularly scheduled passenger airline in America.

== History ==
Stout Air Services was founded by the engineer and businessman, William Bushnell Stout. Stout operated in close conjunction with his aircraft production company, Stout Metal Airplane company. Stout operated from Ford Airport (Dearborn) under the name Detroit-Grand Rapids Airline with round trip fares of $35 in 1926. An airline of firsts, Stout was the first to hire male flight attendants, and the Book Cadillac Hotel became the first airline ticket office by selling Stout Air Services tickets. With expanded services, Stout operated aircraft as Detroit-Cleveland Airline.

In 1928 Stout Air Services purchased airmail routes from Ford Air Transport Service.

On April 29, 1929, Stout Air Services was purchased by United Aircraft and Transport Corporation (UATC). It continued to operate under the Stout name as a separate division. In June 1930, the Universal Air Lines hangar caught fire destroying 27 aircraft, leaving only five. The fire spread to the neighboring Grey Goose Air Lines hangar that housed aircraft leased to Stout Air Lines. On September 12, 1930, National Air Transport (NAT), itself a newly acquired division of UATC, purchased the Stout division. In 1931, NAT in turn became part of the newly formed United Air Lines.

== Destinations ==
- Detroit (Ford Airport (Dearborn))
- Grand Rapids (Airport)
- Cleveland (Cleveland Hopkins International Airport)
- Toledo (Airport)
- Battle Creek and Kalamazoo (Kalamazoo/Battle Creek International Airport)
- South Bend (South Bend International Airport)

== Fleet ==
The Stout Air Services fleet consists of the following aircraft as of 1928:

Stout Air Services Fleet
Aircraft	Total	Routes	Notes
Stout 2-AT Pullman
Ford 4-AT-5	1	Detroit-Cleveland	delivered 23 June 1927
Ford 4-AT-8	1	Detroit-Cleveland	delivered 18 February 1928
Ford 4-AT-34	1		delivered 14 September 1928
Ford 5-AT-15	1		delivered 25 February 1929

== Incidents and accidents ==
Stout Air Service flew over 200,000 miles without an accident or incident.

== See also ==
- List of defunct airlines of the United States
