= Viola Gentry =

American aviator

- Born: Viola Estelle Gentry; 1894; Rockingham, North Carolina, U.S.
- Died: June 23, 1988 (aged 93–94)
- Known for: First woman to set the first non-refueling endurance record for women

Viola Estelle Gentry (1894 – June 23, 1988) was an American aviator, best known for setting the first non-refueling endurance record for women.

== Early life ==
Gentry was born in Rockingham County, North Carolina. She learned to fly an airplane in 1924, becoming the first woman from North Carolina to fly an aircraft.

== Aviation record attempts ==
=== December 1928 ===
On December 20, 1928, Gentry flew 8 hours, 6 minutes and 37 seconds, which set the first non-refueling endurance record for women. She flew a Travel Air 9000. This record was broken in 1929 when Bobbi Trout flew from California for 12 hours straight. Following Elinor Smith's thirteen-and-a-half hour continuous flight, creating a new record for female flight, the Fédération Aéronautique Internationale (FAI) rules were regulated stating that endurance records had to be broken by a full hour.

=== June 1929 ===
In the attempt to reclaim the endurance record, Gentry tried another endurance flight. On June 27, 1929, she took off with her co-pilot Jack Ashcraft, and they managed to remain in flight over Roosevelt Field in Long Island, New York for over nine hours using aerial refueling. However, her aircraft—a Paramount Cabinaire named "The Answer"—crashed in a field in Old Westbury. Ashcraft was killed, but Gentry survived the crash with a fractured skull and crushed shoulders. She was rushed to a hospital in nearby Mineola, where she spent more than six months recovering.

Upon discharge from hospital in Mineola, Gentry took up residence with friends in nearby Freeport. She was unsuccessful in obtaining further work as an endurance pilot although she did return to flying, albeit as a passenger.

=== December 1933 ===
In 1931, Gentry returned to her previous job as a cashier at a Brooklyn restaurant. She continued in her attempts to set flying endurance records. On December 10, 1933, Gentry took off from Miami, Florida, in a new attempt to beat the record, supported by co-pilot Frances Marsalis and a refueling ship manned by Jack Loesing and Fred Fetterman. Gentry intended to remain aloft for ten days and thereby beat the then-current record of eight days, four hours and six minutes, set by Marsalis and Thaden at Valley Stream.

== Later life and death ==
Gentry continued throughout her life to advocate aviation, promoting it among young women and men. In 1934, Gentry and her husband filed for bankruptcy listing their assets as zero. In 1954, Viola Gentry received the Lady Hay Drummond-Hay Air Trophy in recognition of her efforts on behalf of women in aviation. A long-time friend of the aviator Amelia Earhart, Gentry died on June 23, 1988, at the age of 94.
