= Walter J. Carr =

Walter J. Viola
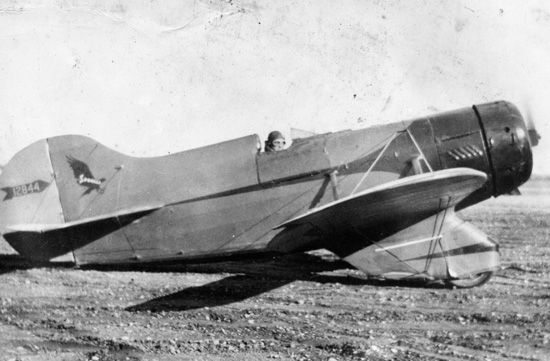
- Born: 1896; Chicago, Illinois
- Spouse: Edieth Deible

Walter J. Carr (1896 – 1970) was an American pilot and aircraft promoter.

== Biography ==
He was born in 1896.

Carr learned for to fly in Chicago, Illinois, soloing in a Curtiss Pusher on 14 June 1914. Car was hired by the Humboldt Exhibition Company to demonstrate flight at fairs. In World War I Carr volunteered as a civilian flight instructor. Afterward, he performed as a barnstormer in a Curtiss Jenny. Carr formed CSC Aircraft Company in 1924 with John Coryell, Walter Savage, and Ed Savage to build a cabin biplane named the Maiden Saginaw. Later Carr became chief test pilot for the Warner Aircraft Corporation testing the Scarab engine. In 1928 Carr formed the Paramount Aircraft Corporation.

In June 1929, Carr was to participate in an endurance record with Viola Gentry flying a Cabinaire named 'The Answer. He was hospitalized with pneumonia, and was replaced with Charles Parkhurst who died in the attempt while landing in fog.

He died in 1970.
