= Travel Air 6000 =

1920s six-seat utility aircraft

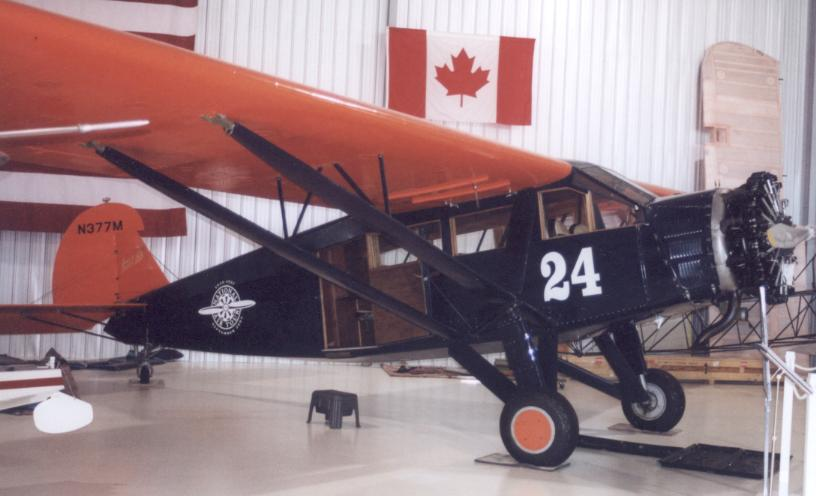
- Travel Air A-6000-A preserved in flying condition carrying the logo of the 2003 National Air Tour

General information
- Type: Civil utility aircraft
- Manufacturer: Travel Air, Curtiss-Wright
- Designer: Herbert Rawdon
- Number built: ca. 150

History
- First flight: April 15, 1928

The Travel Air 6000 (later known as the Curtiss-Wright 6B when Travel Air was purchased by Curtiss-Wright) is a six-seat utility aircraft manufactured in the United States in the late 1920s.

== Design and development ==
It was developed as a luxury version of the Travel Air 5000 marketed principally as an executive aircraft, although its size proved popular with regional airlines, which purchased most of the roughly 150 machines built.

The 6000 was a high-wing braced monoplane with a fuselage constructed of steel tube and covered in fabric. In keeping with its intended luxury market, the fully enclosed cabin was insulated and soundproofed, and included wind-down windows. The basic model was priced at $12,000, but numerous options were offered that could nearly double that price; actor Wallace Beery's aircraft cost him $20,000 and was the most expensive Model 6000 built.

== Operational history ==
=== Airline operation ===
6000s were operated in 1928 by National Air Transport on their US mail and passenger routes from Chicago to New York, Chicago to Dallas and Chicago to Kansas City.

=== Business aircraft ===
Frame number 6B-2012 was delivered to Harry Ogg of Newton, Iowa, on August 20, 1929, who used it as a mobile office and technology demonstrator for his Automatic Washing Machine Company, which eventually morphed into Maytag Corporation. The aircraft was significant in that it included space for a secretary and stenography machine, as well as hook-ups for up to 4 washing machines for demonstration purposes. The aircraft was nicknamed "Smiling Thru" and carried the registration of NC677K.

=== Foreign service ===
Two Travel Air 6000B were purchased by the Paraguayan government during the Chaco War (1932-1935) for the Transport Squadron of its Army Air Arm. These aircraft belonged to TAT with the registrations NC624K (c/n 6B-2011) and NC9815 (c/n 6B-1029); They received the military serials T-2 and T-5 (later re-serialled as T-9). The aircraft were intensively used during the conflict as air ambulances. They both survived the war and continued flying in the Air Arm. In 1945, they were transferred to the first Paraguayan Airline, Líneas Aéreas de Transporte Nacional (LATN) and received the civil registrations ZP-SEC and ZP-SED. They were withdrawn from use in 1947.

=== Exploration ===
American aviator-explorer James "Jimmie" Crawford Angel (1899-1956) was flying a Travel Air 6000B, powered by a Curtiss-Wright J-6-9 engine, registration NC-431W, when he first sighted Angel Falls, Earth's tallest waterfall, on 16 November 1933.

=== Movie appearance ===
A Travel Air 6000 was a "star" in the Howard Hawks 1939 film Only Angels Have Wings which was a fictional depiction of the early mail service in South America whose early days mirrored the aircraft and issues of US civilian mail service. Movie crash is a Hamilton Metal Plane

A Travel Air 6000 also appeared in the 1959 movie, "Edge of Eternity". Registration N377M is still active and it is owned and registered in Mount Pleasant, TX.

A Travel Air 6000 or Curtiss-Wright 6-B performed stunts in the 1939 Laurel & Hardy movie "The Flying Deuces".

== Variants ==
- Model 6000 - six seat version, powered by a 220 hp (164 kW) Wright J-5 engine
- Model 6000A (or A-6000, or A-6000-A) - version powered by 450 hp (336 kW) Pratt & Whitney Wasp engine
- Model SA-6000A - floatplane version of the Model 6000A
- Model 6000B (or B-6000, later 6B) - version powered by 300 hp (224 kW) Wright J-6-9 radial engine.
- Model S-6000-B - floatplane version of the Model 6000B
- Model 6B - 1931 and up Curtiss Wright production. Four built in Wichita, Four Built in San Diego.

== Operators ==
Panama

- Panama Air Force

Paraguay

- Paraguayan Air Force
- LAIN

Peru

- Peruvian Air Force

United States

- Delta Air Lines
- Woodley Airways

== Surviving aircraft ==
- 839 – 6-B airworthy with Henry M. Galpin of Kalispell, Montana.
- 865 – S-6000-B airworthy with Pole Pass Airways in Seattle, Washington.
- 884 – 6-B airworthy with Mid American Flight Museum Mt. Pleasant Texas.
- 967 – S-6000-B on static display at the Alaska Aviation Museum in Anchorage, Alaska.
- 986 – S-6000-B airworthy with Hellgate Equipment in Drummond, Montana.
- 1036 – S-6000-B registered to Philip L. Taylor of Seattle, Washington.
- 1099 – SA-6000-A airworthy with Robert W. Everts of Fairbanks, Alaska.
- A6A-2003 – A-6000-A airworthy with Yellowstone Aviation in Jackson, Wyoming.
- 6B-2005 – S-6000-B registered to Heritage Aircraft in Portland, Oregon.
- 6B-2024 – S-6000-B registered to Richard Livingston of Hamilton, Montana.
- 6B-2040 – 6-B airworthy at the Delta Flight Museum in Atlanta, Georgia.

== Specifications (6000B) ==
Data from Beech Aircraft and their Predecessors

General characteristics

- Crew: 1
- Capacity: 5 passengers
- Length: 31 ft 2 in (9.50 m)
- Wingspan: 48 ft 6 1/2 in (14.80 m)
- Height: 9 ft 0 1/2 in (2.76 m)
- Wing area: 282 sq ft (26.2 m^{2})
- Airfoil: Clark Y (15%)
- Empty weight: 2,700 lb (1,225 kg)
- Gross weight: 4,230 lb (1,919 kg)
- Powerplant: 1 × Wright J-6-9 Whirlwind 9-cylinder air-cooled radial piston engine, 300 hp (220 kW)

Performance

- Maximum speed: 130 mph (210 km/h, 110 kn) at sea level
- Cruise speed: 110 mph (180 km/h, 96 kn)
- Range: 550 mi (890 km, 480 nmi)
- Service ceiling: 16,000 ft (4,900 m)
- Rate of climb: 800 ft/min (4.1 m/s)

== Bibliography ==
- Auliard, Gilles. "Time Machine." Air Classics, April 2006.
- Davies, R.E.G. Airlines of the United States since 1914. Washington, D.C.: Smithsonian Institution Press, 1998. ISBN 1-888962-08-9.
- Hagedorn, Dan and Antonio Luis Sapienza. Aircraft of the Chaco War, 1928-1935. Atglen, Pennsylvania: Schiffer Publishing Co., 1996.
- Pelletier, A. J. Beech Aircraft and their Predecessors. Annapolis, Maryland, USA: Naval Institute Press, 1995. ISBN 1-55750-062-2.
- Sapienza, Antonio Luis (June 2000). "Les premiers avions de transport commercial au Paraguay" [The First Commercial Transport Aircraft in Paraguay]. Avions: Toute l'Aéronautique et son histoire (in French) (87): 45–47. ISSN 1243-8650.
- Taylor, Michael J. H. Jane's Encyclopedia of Aviation. London: Studio Editions, 1989.
