= Bobbi Trout =

American early aviator (1906-2003)

Evelyn "Bobbi" Trout
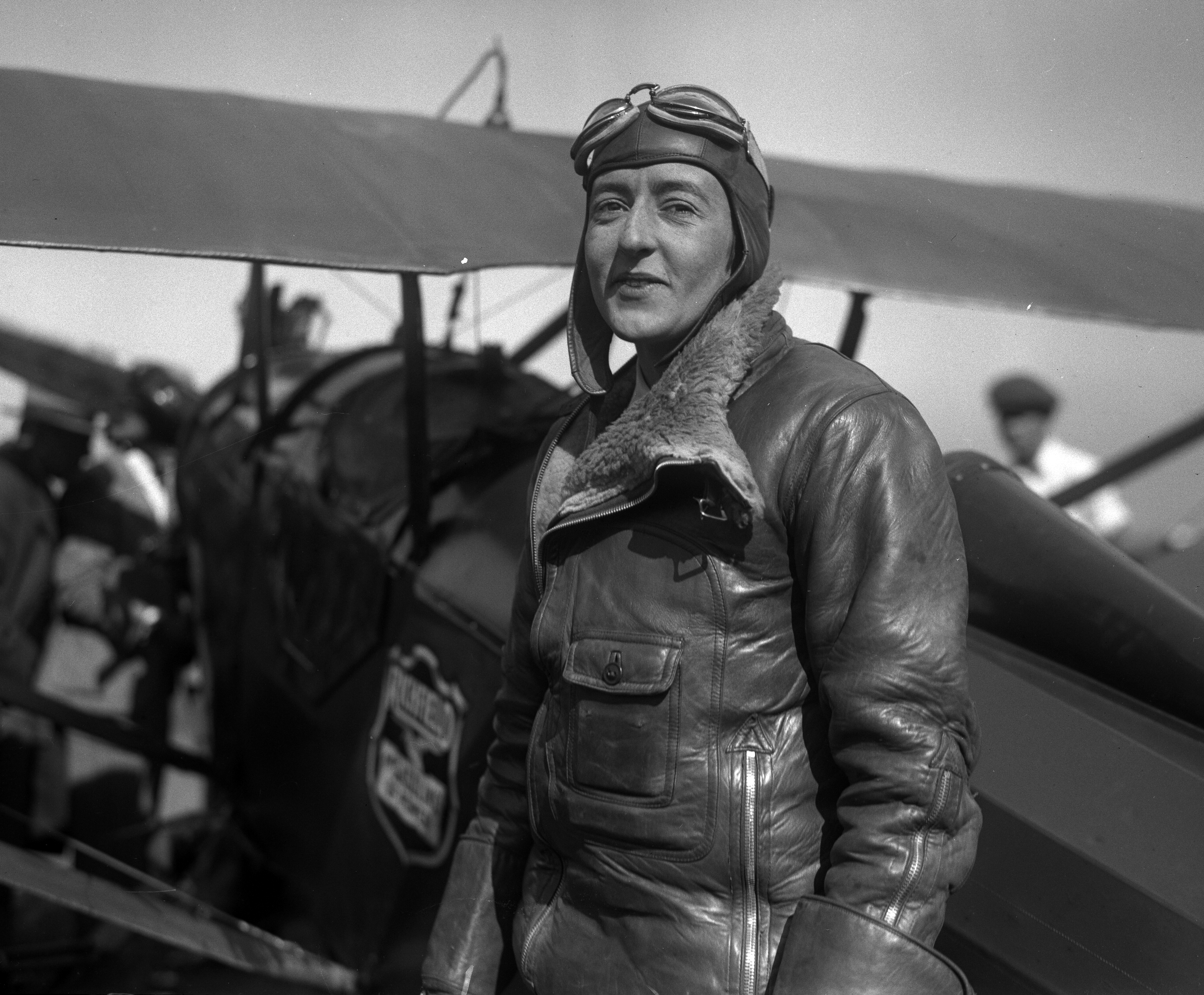
- Trout beside her plane, 1929
- Born: Evelyn Trout; January 7, 1906; Greenup, Illinois, U.S.
- Died: January 24, 2003 (aged 97); San Diego, California, U.S.
- Known for: First woman to set the first non-refueling endurance record for women
- Aviation career
- First flight: December 27, 1922; Curtiss JN-4
- Famous flights: Non-refueling endurance record for women (1929), Powder Puff Derby
- Flight license: September 1, 1928

Evelyn "Bobbi" Trout (January 7, 1906 – January 24, 2003) was an early American aviator and endurance flying record holder. Trout began her aviation career at the age of 16; however, her first solo flight and solo certificate was not until April 30, 1928. In the spring of 1928, Trout’s mother bought her an International K-6 biplane. Trout received her pilot's identification card from the United States Department of Commerce on September 1, 1928. She was the second woman to break the non-refueling endurance record for women when she flew 12 hours straight from California in 1929. The record was previously held by Viola Gentry and was the first record where Fédération Aéronautique Internationale (FAI) rules of endurance were revised stating endurance records had to be broken by a full hour. Trout also participated in the Women's Air Derby of 1929, which was dubbed the Powder Puff Derby. In 2001, she was recognized as the only living participant in the first Women's Air Derby of 1929. Evelyn got her nickname "Bobbi" when she copied the hairstyle of the famous dancer Irene Castle, which was a short "bob" haircut.

== Early life ==
Bobbi Trout was born on January 7, 1906, to Lola Trout and George Trout in Greenup, Illinois. One afternoon in 1918, Trout heard an aeroplane fly overhead. This incident piqued her interest in the field of aviation. Trout moved from Illinois to California with her family in 1920, when they purchased a service station. One day while tending the family business, Trout told her dreams to one of their patrons, W.E. Thomas, who coincidentally owned a Curtiss JN-4. Thomas asked Trout if she wanted a ride on the aircraft, which she accepted on December 27, 1922, taking off from Rogers Airport located in west Los Angeles. Trout saved up approximately $2,500 to enter Burdett Fuller’s flying school (the Burdett Airlines, Inc., School of Aviation) on January 1, 1928. In one of her flight lessons, she was instructed by a young pilot to three-quarter turn at low altitude, which resulted in the biplane spinning out of control. The resulting crash wrecked the plane completely. This accident did not deter Trout from flying, and she completed her first solo flight on April 30, 1928, and received her solo certificate.

== Aviation career ==
After getting her license, Trout flew a Golden Eagle at the Metropolitan Airport in Los Angeles as an official dedication on December 14, 1928. Trout followed this up on January 2, 1929, flying from the same airport for 12 hours 11 minutes, shattering the previous record, held by Viola Gentry, by more than 4 hours. This record was short lived, as aviator Elinor Smith broke the record once again on January 30, 1929. Smith flew 13 and a half hours straight from Mitchel Field using an open cockpit Bruner Winkle biplane. Determined to take back the record, Trout flew from Mines Field on February 10, 1929, returning this time after more than 17 hours. This flight set the record for the first all-night flight by a woman as well as the new women's solo endurance record. In the same year on June 16, Trout flew a 90 horsepower Golden Eagle Chief to an altitude of 15,200 feet (4,600 m) breaking the light class aircraft altitude record. Modifying the same aircraft to use a 100 horsepower engine, Trout flew from Clover Field in Santa Monica, California, to the first Women's Transcontinental Air Derby together with other women aviators including Amelia Earhart. During the nine-day race, they experienced difficulty navigating using road maps. Trout, Earhart, Gentry and the other ladies managed to communicate under difficult circumstances. This led to the development of the Ninety-Nines: International Organization of Women Pilots.

In order to get more sponsorship, Trout asked starlet Edna Mae Cooper if she wanted to go with her to attempt another endurance run. They first tried it on January 1, 1931, but due to technical problems they had to abort the flight. At their next attempt, they were successful in flying straight for 122 hours and 50 minutes, only to end the run on January 9, 1931, due to the spitting off fuel. This record was later recognized by King Carol II of Romania, whose representative gave her a Royal Decree with aviation cross for pilots who made record flights, a distinction shared by two other pilots - Amelia Earhart and Charles Lindbergh.

== Later life ==
Trout celebrated her 80th birthday with an interview from within a helicopter over the Golden Gate Bridge in San Francisco, California, on January 7, 1986. In May of the same year she was honored during the Gathering of Eagles Program at Maxwell Air Force Base in Montgomery, Alabama. In 1999 she was recognized as the only living participant from the first Women's Air Derby of 1929. Trout retired to San Diego, California, and suffered a fatal heart attack on January 24, 2003. She never married and is survived by her sister-in-law Hazel Trout and her nephew Brook Trout.
