= Paramount Aircraft Corporation =

American aircraft manufacturer

- Company type: Aircraft Manufacturer
- Founded: 28 August 1928
- Key people: Walter J. Carr, Joseph Behse

Paramount Aircraft Corporation was an American aircraft manufacturer based out of Saginaw, Michigan The company was formed by Walter J. Carr to produce his highly modified Warner powered Travel Air, the Cabinaire. Eight units were built, with one becoming used for an aerial refueling record attempt. Carr left the company in September 1930 after poor sales of the new aircraft. Behse remained and produced the two-seat side by side open cockpit sportster. During a demonstration flight, the prototype spun in after a steep climb on takeoff and crashed into a lake on 16 May 1931, killing Behse and passenger Whitney Merritt. The company was dissolved as a result.

== Aircraft ==
Summary of aircraft built by
Model name	First flight	Number built	Type
Paramount Cabinaire	1929	8	Cabin Biplane
Paramount Model 120 Sportster	1931	1	2 place floatplane
