= List of aircraft (B–Be) =

This is a list of aircraft in alphabetical order beginning with 'B' as far as 'Be'.

== B–Be ==
=== B&F ===
(B&F Technik Vertriebs gmbh, Germany)

- B&F Fk9
- B&F Fk12
- B&F Fk14 Polaris
- B&F Fk131 Bücker Jungmann
- FK-Lightplanes SW51 Mustang

=== BA ===
see: British Aircraft Manufacturing

=== Baade ===
(Dr. Brunholf Baade, East Germany, see: OKB-1 and VEB)

- Baade 152
- Baade 153, twin-engine medium-range turboprop airliner
- Baade 154 (1955), four-engine long-range turboprop airliner, resembled the Ilyushin Il-18; cancelled due to the Il-18
- Baade 154 (1959), four-engine jetliner
- Baade 155 (1955), twin-engine medium-range turboprop airliner
- Baade 155 (1959), twin-engine short-range jetliner
- Baade 156/157, twin-engine agriculture aircraft; the 157 was a development of the 156
- Baade 160 (1956), four-engine medium-range jetliner, improved 152
- Baade 160-178, a series of jet trainer designs

=== BAaer ===
(BA-Aeroplanos, Buenos Aires, Argentina)

- BAaer Guri

=== Babcock ===
- Babcock 1905 Wright Flyer copy
- Babcock 1909 Wright Flyer copy
- Babcock 1910 Monoplane
- Babcock 1913 Curtiss Pusher Copy
- Babcock 1916 Biplane
- Babcock LC-7
- Babcock LC-11 Cadet
- Babcock LC-13
- Babcock-Vlchek X Airmaster
- Babcock Ranger
- Babcock Series 1
- Babcock Teal

=== BAC ===
see:British Aircraft Company

=== BAC ===
see:British Aircraft Corporation

=== Back Bone ===
(Tallard, France)

- Back Bone Seraph
- Back Bone Shadow
- Back Bone Silver

=== Bach ===
(Bach Aircraft Co, Clover Field, Santa Monica, CA / Morton L. Bach)

- Bach 3-CT Air Yacht
- Bach Air Yacht
- Bach CS-1
- Bach CS-4
- Bach Polar Bear
- Bach Super Transport
- Bach T-11-P

=== Bachem ===
(Erich Bachem / Bachem-Werke)

- Bachem Lerche
- Bachem Ba 349 Natter
- Ba BP 20 - (Manned Flak Rocket) First versions of Ba-349, some Non-VTO fitted with fixed landing gear and solid nose for flight testing

=== Backcountry Super Cubs ===
(Backcountry Super Cubs, LLC, Douglas, WY)

- Backcountry Super Cubs Mackey SQ2
- Backcountry Super Cubs Supercruiser
- Backcountry Super Cubs Super Cub

=== Backstrom ===
(Al Backstrom, Fort Worth, TX)

- Backstrom WPB-1
- Backstrom EPB-1 Flying Plank
- Backstrom Flying Plank II

=== Bacon ===
(Erle L. Bacon Corporation)

- Bacon Super T-6

=== Badez-Giraud-Mercier ===
- Badez-Giraud-Mercier Bagimer

=== BAe ===
see:British Aerospace

=== BAE Systems ===
- BAE Systems HERTI
- BAE Systems Fury
- BAE Systems Nimrod MRA4
- BAE Systems Hawk
- BAE Systems Ampersand
- BAE Systems Mantis
- BAE Systems Taranis
- BAE Systems Demon
- BAE Systems PHASA-35

=== Baco ===
(Bethlehem Aircraft Corp, Bethlehem, PA)

- Baco Skylark

=== BAG ===
(Bahnbedarf AG, Darmstadt)

- BAG D.I (Akaflieg Darmstadt D-8)
- BAG D.II
- BAG E.I
- BAG E.II

=== Bagg ===
(Roy Raymond Bagg, Mooreton, ND)

- Bagg Model 1

=== Bagalini ===
(Marino Bagalini)

- Bagalini Baga 68
- Bagalini Bagaliante
- Bagalini Bagalini
- Bagalini Baganfibio
- Bagalini Colombo

=== Bahl ===
((Brooks B) Harding, (A D) Zook & (Errold G) Bahl, Lincoln, NE)

- Bahl Lark Monoplane

=== Bailey ===
(Charles Bailey, Madison, NC)

- Bailey The Thing

=== Bailey ===
(Dick Bailey)

- Bailey Model B Bitty Bipe

=== Bailey Aviation ===
(Bassingbourn, Royston, United Kingdom)

- Bailey JPX D330
- Bailey Solo
- Bailey V5 paramotor

=== Bailey & Gray ===
(John & Ross Bailey and Marsh Gray, Kingston, NC)

- Bailey & Gray 1911 Monoplane

=== Baja California ===
(designer - Lascurain Y Osio)

- BAJA California BC.1
- BAJA California BC.2
- BAJA California BC.3

=== Bakeng ===
(Gerald Bakeng, Edmonds, WA)

- Bakeng Duce
- Bakeng Double Duce

=== Baker ===
(Al and Ray Baker, Kansas City, MO)

- Baker Pete
- Baker Special
- Shannon-Buente Special

=== Baker ===
(Bobby Baker)

- Baker Supercat
- Baker Bobcat

=== Baker ===
(Gil Baker)

- Baker BCA-1 Amphibian

=== Baker ===
(Baker Air Research, Huron, OH)

- Baker Aquarius
- Baker MB-1 Delta Kitten
- Baker Boo Ray

=== Baker ===
(Art Baker, Kansas City, MO)

- Baker B-2

=== Baker-Scott ===
(Clyde Baker & Tommy Scott, Bartlett Tennessee, US)

- Baker-Scott A

=== Bal-Aire ===
(Ballard Leins, Tinley Park, IL)

- Bal-Aire BA

=== Baldwin ===
(Baldwin Aeroplanes)

- Baldwin Red Devil

=== Baldwin ===
((Gary) Baldwin Aircraft Intl.)

- Baldwin ASP-XJ
- Baldwin ASP-XJS

=== Ball ===
(Clifford Ball, Bettis Field, McKeesport, PA)

- Ball S-T

=== Ballard Sport Aircraft ===
(Ballard Sport Aircraft, Limited, Sherbrooke, Quebec)

- Ballard Pelican

=== Ball-Bartoe ===
(Ball-Bartoe Aircraft Corp, Boulder, CO)

- Ball-Bartoe JW-1 Jetwing

=== Ballou-Whitehair ===
((W J) Ballou-(Walter L) Whitehair Aeroplane Co, Portland, OR)

- Ballou-Whitehair 1929 Aircraft

=== Bally ===
(Jack Bally & Don Smith)

- Bally B-17

=== Baltrun ===
((Joseph) Baltrun Flying Service, Springfield, MA)

- Baltrun 1930 Biplane

=== Bancroft ===
((Basil or Louis) Bancroft Airplane Co, E Hartford, CT)

- Bancroft 1917 Biplane

=== Bánhidi ===
(Antal Bánhidi)

- Bánhidi Gerle

=== Bánhidi-Lampich ===
(Antal Bánhidi and Arpad Lampich)

- Bánhidi-Lampich BL-5
- Bánhidi-Lampich BL-6
- Bánhidi-Lampich BL-7 (BL-5 Redesigned by Rubik and Pap)
- Bánhidi-Lampich BL-16

=== Bannick ===
((Lester) Bannick Copter Co, Phoenix, AZ)

- Bannick Model C Copter
- Bannick Model VW Copter
- Bannick Model T of the Air

=== Barbaro ===
(René Barbaro) Data from:'

- Barbaro RB-10
- Barbaro RB-20
- Barbaro RB-30 (F-WFOT)
- Barbaro RB-40 (F-WFOT)?
- Barbaro RB-50
- Barbaro RB-51
- Barbaro RB-60 (F-PPZG)
- Barbaro RB-70 twin (F-PTEL)
- Barbaro-Gagnant BG.10
- Chagnes-Barbaro CG.10

=== Barber ===
(Bill Barber)

- Barber Snark

=== Barbette ===
(Roland Barbette & Jacky Dessendre)

- Barette AL/BARDE Ruty (Avion Léger/BARbette-DEssendre)

=== Barcala-Cierva-Diaz ===
(Sociedad Industrial de Construcciones Aeronauticas Llamada Barcala-Cierva-Diaz)-(Jose Barcala - Juan de la Cierva - Pablo Diaz)

- Barcala-Cierva-Diaz BCD1 El Cangrejo (The Crab)
- Barcala-Cierva-Diaz BCD2
- Barcala-Cierva-Díaz BCD3

=== Bárcenas ===
(Aeroservicio Bárcenas S.A)

- Bárcenas B-01

=== Barclay ===
(Irwin R Barclay, Bloomington, IN)

- Barclay 1933 Monoplane

=== Barillon ===
(Pierre Barillon)

- Barillon 1909 Monoplane

=== Baritsky ===
- Baritsky Gyroplane A

=== Barker ===
(Art Barker, Kansas City, MO)

- Barker B-2

=== Barker-Bowser ===
(Gailard Barker & Kenneth Bowser, Phoenix, AZ)

- Barker-Bowser B-1 Midniter

=== Barkhoff ===
- Barkhoff Retractable Wing (Con Ellingston Special)

=== Barkley-Grow ===
- Barkley-Grow T8P-1

=== Barkley-Warwick ===
((Archibald S) Barkley & Warwick Aircraft Corp, 7490 Melville St, Detroit, MI)

- Barkley-Warwick BW-1

=== Barlatier ===
(Henri Blanc et Emile Barlatier)

- Barlatier et Blanc 1908 monoplane

=== Barling ===
(Barling Aircraft Co, 526 North 2nd St, St Joseph, MO)

- Barling A
- Barling B-6
- Barling XNBL-1 Bomber

=== Barlow ===
(Carl O. Barlow / Option Air Reno)

- Barlow Acapella 100

=== Barnard ===
(Barnard Aircraft Corp, Syracuse, US)

- New Strandard D-31

=== Barnes ===
(S H Barnes, Escalon CA. 19??: 110 N Cypress St, Burbank, CA)

- Barnes BGX-1

=== Barnett ===
( (K J) Barnett Rotorcraft Co, Olivehurst, CA)

- Barnett J3M
- Barnett J4M
- Barnett J4B

=== Barney ===
(Barney Snyder, 3706 49 St, San Diego, CA)

- Barney S-1
- Barney Sportster
- Barney Wren

=== Barnhart ===
((G Edward) Barnhart, San Diego CA. 1922: Barnhart Aircraft Inc, 44 W Green St, Pasadena, CA)

- Barnhart 1916 Biplane
- Barnhart Twin 15 Wampus Kat (1921) twin-engine biplane transport

=== Barr ===
(Jim Barr / Barr Aircraft, Williamsport, PA)

- Barrsix

=== Barrett ===
(Barrett Aircraft Corp, Anoka, MN)

- Barrett Gyracar

=== Barrett ===
(Barrett Aircraft, 2442 Santa Monica Blvd, Santa Monica, CA)

- Barrett 1931 Monoplane

=== Barritault ===
(Jean Barritault)

- Barritault JB.01

=== Barritt ===
(John E Barritt, Riverside CA, later Berkeley, CA)

- Barritt BM-1

=== Barrón ===
(Eduardo Barrón)

- Barrón España
- Barrón Flecha
- Barrón W
- Barrón Delta
- Barrón Triplano

=== Barrows ===
(Robert Barrows, Virginia)

- Barrows Grasshopper
- Barrows Bearhawk
- Bearhawk Companion
- Barrows Bearhawk Patrol
- Bearhawk LSA

=== Barry ===
(Howard S Barry, Birmingham, Alabama, AL)

- Barry Sport

=== Bartel ===
- Bartel 1918 monoplane
- Bartel BM 1
- Bartel BM 2
- Bartel BM 4
- Bartel BM 5
- Bartel BM 6

=== Bartini ===
(Robert Ludvigovich Bartini)

- Bartini A-57
- (Bartini) Beriev Be-1
- Bartini DAR
- Bartini Stal-6
- Bartini Stal-7
- Bartini Stal-8
- Bartini T-108
- Bartini T-117
- Bartini T-200
- Bartini Beriev VVA-14
- Bartini 14M1P

=== Bartlett ===
(Bartlett Aircraft Corp.)

- Bartlett Zephyr

=== Bartok ===
(Frank Bartok, Dillonvale, OH)

- Bartok KA-32

=== Barton ===
(Wayne F Barton, Northglenn, CO)

- Barton Sylkie One, also known as the Barton Model B-1

=== Basler ===
- Basler BT-67
- Basler Turbo 37

=== Bassan-Gué ===
- Bassan-Gué BN4 night bomber

=== Bassou ===
(André Bassou) (see also Societe de Constructions et d'Aviation Legere - SCAL)

- Bassou FB.20 Rubis
- Bassou FB.31 Rubis
- Bassou FB.41
- Bassou Sport

=== Bastet ===
(Raymond Bastet)

- Bastet 01

=== Bastianelli ===
(Bastianelli brothers see also Societá Industriale l'Aviazone)

- Bastianelli P.R.B.

=== Bastier ===
- Biplan Bastier 1912

=== B.A.T. ===
(British Aerial Transport Company Limited)

- BAT F.K.20
- BAT F.K.21
- BAT F.K.22
- BAT F.K.23 Bantam
- BAT F.K.24 Baboon
- BAT F.K.25 Basilisk
- BAT F.K.26
- BAT F.K.27
- BAT F.K.28 Crow

=== Bat ===
(Noran Aircraft Co Ltd (founders: Robert E McGill & L M Finch), 157 10th St, San Francisco, CA)

- Bat P-1
- Bat P-2

=== Bates ===
((Carl) Bates Aeroplane Co, Chicago IL. 1912: Acquired by Heath Aircraft Co, Chicago, IL)

- Bates 1908 Biplane I
- Bates 1908 Biplane II
- Bates 1911 Monoplane

=== Batson ===
(Matthew Arlington Batson, Union County, IL 1912: Batson Air Navigation Co, Savannah, GA)

- Batson Air Yacht
- Batson Dragonfly

=== Battaille ===
- Battaille Triplane

=== Batwing ===
(Batwing Aircraft Co. (fdr: Walter F McGinty), Alameda, CA)

- Batwing X-1

=== Bauer ===
- Bauer Bz 1
- Bauer Bz 2

=== Bauer Avion ===
(Prague, Czech Republic)

- Bauer BAD-12 Gyrotrainer

=== Bauer-Hueber ===
(J Carl Bauer & Lewis Hueber)

- Bauer-Hueber 1936 Monoplane

=== Baumann ===
(Jack B) Baumann Aircraft Corp, Knoxville, TN

- Baumann B-65
- Baumann B-90
- Baumann B-100
- Baumann B-120
- Baumann BT-120
- Baumann B-250
- Baumann B-290 Brigadier
- Baumann B-360 Brigadier
- Baumann B-480 Super Brigadier
- Custer CCW-5

=== Bäumer ===
(Bäumer Aero GmbH)

- Bäumer B I Roter Vogel
- Bäumer B II Sausewind
- Bäumer B III Alsterkind
- Bäumer B IV Sausewind
- Bäumer B V Puck
- Bäumer B VI Libelle
- Bäumer B VII

=== Baumgärtl ===
(Paul Baumgärtl)

- Baumgärtl Heliofly I
- Baumgärtl Heliofly III/57
- Baumgärtl Heliofly III/59
- Baumgärtl PB-60
- Baumgärtl PB-63
- Baumgärtl PB-64

=== Baumhauer ===
(Albert Gillis von Baumhauer)

- Baumhauer helicopter

=== Baumuster ===
(Flugzeugbaus Wagener & Hamburg-Flughafen)

- Baumuster HW 4a

=== Bay ===
(Bay Aviation)

- Bay Super "V" Bonanza

=== Bayerische Flugzeugwerke AG ===
see BFW

=== BDC Aero ===
(BDC Aero Industrie (aka Puma Aircraft), Lachute, Quebec, Canada)

- BDC Aero Puma

=== BDM ===
- BDM 01

=== Beach ===
(Irl Simeon Beach, 241 E Douglas Ave, Wichita, KS)

- Beach B-5

=== Beach-Whitehead ===
(Stanley Yale Beach & Gustave Whitehead, Bridgeport, CT; Scientific Aeroplane Co, 125 E 23rd St, New York, NY)

- Beach-Whitehead Gyroscopic Biplane

=== Beach-Willard ===
(Stanley Yale Beach & Charles F. Willard, New York)

- Beach-Willard 1909 Monoplane

=== Beachey ===
(Lincoln Beachey)

- Beachey Little Looper
- Beachey-Curtiss Looper
- Beachey-Curtiss Tractor
- Beachey-Eaton 1915 Monoplane
- Beachey-Stupar 1914 Biplane

=== Beachner ===
(Chris Beachner, Tucson AZ. Mizell Enterprises (after Beachner's death), Brighton CO.)

- Beachner V-8 Special

=== Beagle ===
- Beagle A.61 Terrier
- Beagle A.113 Husky
- Beagle A.115 A.O.P. Mk.III
- Beagle B.109 Airedale
- Beagle B.121 Pup
- Beagle B.206
- Beagle B.206R Basset CC.1
- Beagle M.218
- Beagle M.242
- Beagle D.4/108
- Beagle D.5/180
- Beagle D.6/180

=== Beal ===
(Ralph Beal, Kansas City, MO)

- Beal BM-3
- Beal BP-2
- Beal CM-4
- Century Centurion
- Century SMB-4

=== Bealine ===
(Bealine Flying Service (pres: Thomas W Beal), Humble, TX)

- Bealine Sporty

=== Beard ===
(Otis & Louis Beard, St Petersburg, FL)

- Beard Model B

=== Beardmore ===
- Beardmore Inflexible (Rohrbach Ro VI)
- Beardmore W.B.I
- Beardmore W.B.Ia
- Beardmore W.B.II
- Beardmore W.B.IIa Adriatic
- Beardmore W.B.IIb
- Beardmore W.B.III
- Beardmore W.B.IV
- Beardmore W.B.V
- Beardmore W.B.VI
- Beardmore W.B.VIII
- Beardmore W.B.IX flying boat project
- Beardmore W.B.XXIV Wee Bee
- Beardmore W.B.XXV fighter project
- Beardmore W.B.XXVI
- Beardmore BeRo.2 Inverness (Rohrbach Ro IV)

=== Bearhawk ===
(Bearhawk Aircraft)

- Bearhawk 4-Place
- Bearhawk 5
- Bearhawk Patrol
- Bearhawk Companion
- Bearhawk LSA

=== Beattie-Fellers ===
(Ronald Beattie & Walter Fellers)

- Beattie-Fellers S-1

=== Beatty ===
(George W Beatty / Beatty Aviation Company)

- Beatty-Wright 1911 Biplane
- Beatty 1916 biplane

=== Beaujon ===
(Beaujon Aircraft, Ardmore, OK)

- Beaujon BJ-2
- Beaujon Enduro
- Beaujon Flybike
- Beaujon Hardnose
- Beaujon Mach .07
- Beaujon Minimac
- Beaujon Viewmaster
- Beaujon Windward

=== Beaumont ===
(Roland W Beaumont, Buffalo, NY)

- Beaumont 1934 Monoplane

=== Beauregard ===
- Beauregard RB-01

=== Béchereau ===
(Louis Béchereau / Societe et Ateliers Béchereau)

- Béchereau SAB C.1 (Béchereau, Louis Blériot and Adolphe Bernard, supported by Marc Birkigt)
- Béchereau SRAP T.7

=== Becker ===
(Arthur H Becker, Brocton, NY)

- Becker BS-4

=== Beckner ===
(F W Beckner, Victoria, TX)

- Beckner FW-1
- Beckner FW-2

=== Beco ===
((Harvey) Beilgard Co, Beverly Hills, CA)

- Beco B-1
- Beco B-5
- Beco-Brown L-5

=== Bede ===
(Bede Aviation Inc, Chesterfield, MO)

- Bede BD-1
- Bede XBD-2
- Bede BD-2
- Bede BD-3
- Bede BD-4
- Bede BD-5
- Bede BD-6
- Bede BD-7
- Bede BD-8
- Bede BD-9
- Bede BD-10
- Bede BD-11
- Bede BD-12
- Bede BD-14
- Bede BD-16
- Bede BD-17
- Bede BD-18
- Bede BD-22L
- Bede HB-1 Super Demoiselle
- Bede Wing

=== Bedek ===
(Bedek Aviation)

- Bedek B-101

=== Bee Line ===
(Harry T Booth & Arthur L "Mike" Thurston)

- Bee line BR (sometimes referred to as the Thurston racer or the Booth racer)

=== Beebe ===
(Henry J Beebe, Scienceville, OH)

- Beebe 1937 Monoplane

=== [Beebe Aircraft Service]] ===
(Emmett W Beebe, Muskegon, MI)

- 150hp Hisso A-powered 40ft-span parasol monoplane. Pilot in open cockpit behind wing and cabin. One built, crashed near in 1929.

=== Beechcraft ===
(Beech Aircraft Corp. (founders: Walter Beech, Olive Ann Beech), Wichita, KS)

- Beechcraft Model 16
- Beech Model 17 Staggerwing
- Beech Model 18 Twin Beech
- Beech Model 19 Musketeer
- Beech Model 23 Musketeer and Sundowner
- Beech Model 24 Sierra
- Beech Model 33 Debonair
- Beech Model 34 Twin-Quad
- Beech Model 35 Bonanza
- Beech Model 36 Bonanza
- Beech Model 38P Lightning
- Beech Model 45
- Beech Model 50 Twin Bonanza
- Beech Model 55 Baron
- Beech Model 56 Baron
- Beech Model 58 Baron
- Beech Model 60 Duke
- Beech Model 65 Queen Air
- Beech Model 70 Queen Airliner
- Beech Model 73 Jet Mentor
- Beech Model 76 Duchess
- Beech Model 77 Skipper
- Beech Model 80 Queen Air
- Beech Model 88 Queen Air
- Beech Model 90 King Air
- Beech Model 95 Travel Air
- Beech Model 99 Airliner
- Beech Model 100 King Air
- Beech Model 200 King Air
- Beech Model 300 King Air
- Beech Model 350 Super King Air
- Beech King Air 350i
- Beech Model 400 Beechjet
- Beech Model 1300 Airliner
- Beech Model 1900 Airliner
- Beech Model 2000 Starship
- Beech A-38 Grizzly
- Beech AT-6B Wolverine
- Beech AT-7 Navigator
- Beech AT-10 Wichita
- Beech AT-11 Kansan
- Beech C-6 Ute
- Beech C-12 Huron
- Beech C-43 Traveler
- Beech C-45 Expeditor
- Beech CT-128 Expeditor Canadian Armed Forces
- Beech CT-134 Musketeer Canadian Armed Forces
- Beech CT-145 Super King Air Canadian Armed Forces
- Beech CQ-3
- Beech F-2
- Beech GB
- Beech JB
- Beech JRB
- Beech L-23 Seminole
- Beech SNB
- Beech T-1A Jayhawk
- Beech T-6 Texan II
- Beech T-34 Mentor
- Beech T-36
- Beech T-42 Cochise
- Beech T-44 Pegasus
- Beech U-8 Seminole
- Beech U-21 Ute
- Beech U-22
- Beech PD-249
- Beech QA-65

=== Beecraft ===
(Bee Aviation Associates)

- Beecraft Queen Bee
- Beecraft Honeybee
- Beecraft Wee Bee

=== Beese-Boutard ===
(Melli Beese and Charles Boutard)

- Beese-Boutard Flugboot

=== Beets ===
(Glenn Beets, Riverside, CA)

- Beets GB-1 Special

=== Beidenmeister ===
(Karl A Beidenmeister, Indianapolis, IN)

- Beidenmeister 1925 Biplane

=== Beijing Aviation Institute ===
- Beijing-1

=== Beijing Aviation Polytechnic School ===
- Hongqi-1

=== Belcher ===
((Osmond Theron) Belcher Aerial Mfg Co, Los Angeles, CA)

- Belcher B.T.1 Airliner California

=== Bel Geddes ===
(Norman Bel Geddes, New York, NY)

- Bel Geddes Air Liner#4

=== Bélin ===
(Henri Bélin)

- Bélin Zéphir

=== Belite ===
(Belite Aircraft)

- Belite Ultra Cub
- Belite Aircraft 254
- Belite Aircraft Superlite
- Belite Aircraft Trike

=== Bell ===
(Fred Bell)

- Bell Sidewinder

=== Bell ===
(Oscar Perry Bell, Atchison, KS)

- Bell B

=== Bell ===
(John Robert Bell, Belle Vernon, PA)

- Bell LM

=== Bell ===
- Bell 1914 Biplane
- Bell 1
- Bell 2
- Bell 3
- Bell 7
- Bell 8
- Bell 11
- Bell 12
- Bell 13
- Bell 15
- Bell 16
- Bell 17
- Bell 23
- Bell 26
- Bell 27
- Bell 29
- Bell 30
- Bell 32
- Bell 33
- Bell 34
- Bell 37
- Bell 38
- Bell 40
- Bell 41
- Bell 42
- Bell 43
- Bell 44
- Bell 45
- Bell 47
- Bell 48
- Bell 52
- Bell 54
- Bell 58
- Bell 59
- Bell 60
- Bell 61
- Bell 65 ATV
- Bell 68
- Bell 201
- Bell 204
- Bell 205
- Bell 206 Jetranger
- Bell 207 Sioux Scout
- Bell 208
- Bell 209
- Bell 211
- Bell 212
- Bell 214
- Bell 214ST
- Bell 222
- Bell 230
- Bell 249
- Bell 255
- Bell 301
- Bell 309
- Bell 360 Invictus
- Bell 400 Twin Ranger
- Bell 406
- Bell 407
- Bell 409
- Bell 412
- Bell 427
- Bell 429
- Bell 430
- Bell 440 Twin Ranger
- Bell 525 Relentless
- Bell 533
- Bell FCX-001
- Bell A-7 Airacobra
- Bell XF-109
- Bell YFM-1 Airacuda
- Bell AH-1 Cobra
  - Bell AH-1 SuperCobra
  - Bell AH-1Z Viper
- Bell UH-1 Iroquois
  - Bell UH-1Y Venom
  - Bell UH-1N Twin Huey
- Bell H-4 Kiowa
- Bell H-13 Sioux
- Bell H-15
- Bell H-33
- Bell H-40
- Bell H-57 Sea Ranger
- Bell OH-58 Warrior Armed Observation Helicopter
- Bell OH-58 Kiowa
- Bell YAH-63
- Bell H-67 Creek
- Bell ARH-70
- Bell HO-4
- Bell HU-1
- Bell P-39 Airacobra
- Bell XP-45
- Bell XP-52
- Bell P-59 Airacomet
- Bell P-63 Kingcobra
- Bell XP-76
- Bell XP-77
- Bell XP-83
- Bell R-12
- Bell R-13
- Bell R-15
- Bell XV-3 Convertiplane
- Bell XV-15
- Bell X-1
- Bell X-2
- Bell X-5
- Bell X-14
- Bell X-16
- Bell X-22
- Bell XS-1
- Bell XS-2
- Bell XS-5
- Bell FL Airabonita
- Bell F2L Airabonita
- Bell XF3L
- Bell HSL
- Bell HTL
- Bell HUL
- LLRV
- Bell Eagle Eye
- Bell Co-axial Rotor Helicopter
- Bell D-292 ACAP
- Bell L-39
- Bell P-400
- Bell CH-118 Iroquois Canadian Armed Forces
- Bell CH-135 Twin Huey Canadian Armed Forces
- Bell CH-136 Kiowa Canadian Armed Forces
- Bell CH-139 Jet Ranger Canadian Armed Forces
- Bell CH-146 Griffon Canadian Armed Forces
- Bell D-188A
- Bell Wing Ding Experimental compound helicopter

=== Bell-Agusta ===
- Bell/Agusta BA609

=== Bell-Boeing Vertol ===
- Bell-Boeing Vertol V-22 Osprey

=== Bellamy-Hillbourne ===
- BH.1 Halcyon

=== Bellanca ===
(AviaBellanca Aircraft Corporation / Giuseppe Mario Bellanca)

- Bellanca 1911 monoplane
- Bellanca 1923 6-seat biplane
- Bellanca 1923 2-seat biplane
- Bellanca 1924 monoplane
- Bellanca 2-12 - Class KD Target Drone. NASM archives.
- Bellanca 11 Trainer
- Bellanca 14-7 Cruisair Junior
- Bellanca 14-9 Cruisair Junior
- Bellanca 14-10L
- Bellanca 14-12 Cruisair
- Bellanca 14-13
- Bellanca 14-19 Cruisemaster
- Bellanca 14-19A Bravo
- Bellanca 17-20
- Bellanca 17-30 Viking
- Bellanca 17-110 Interceptor - Allison V-1710-33 (1939). NASM archives.
- Bellanca 18-13 - NASM archives.
- Bellanca 18-40 - NASM archives.
- Bellanca 19-25 Skyrocket II
- Bellanca 19-18 - "Important Technical Information." NASM archives.
- Bellanca 19-67 - NASM archives.
- Bellanca 20-115 Pursuit, Turbo Supercharger - (1939). NASM archives.
- Bellanca 22-80 (Alternate) - "VF Proposal Biplane" (1935). NASM archives
- Bellanca 23-55 - NASM archives.
- Bellanca 23-80 - "VF High Wing" (1935). NASM archives.
- Bellanca 24-45 - NASM archives.
- Bellanca 27-50 - NASM archives.
- Bellanca 28-70 Flash
- Bellanca 28-90 Flash
- Bellanca 28-90B
- Bellanca 28-92
- Bellanca 28-100 - NASM archives.
- Bellanca 28-110
- Bellanca 28-140 - NASM archives.
- Bellanca 30-42 Special
- Bellanca 31-40 Pacemaker Senior
- Bellanca 31-42 Pacemaker Senior
- Bellanca 31-50
- Bellanca 31-55 Skyrocket Senior
- Bellanca 33-220 Twin Engine Pursuit - (1939) NASM archives.
- Bellanca 49-42 Liaison Short Range Observation - NASM archives.
- Bellanca 50-210 Trimotor Bomber - NASM archives.
- Bellanca 65-75 - "Group Weight Statement, From Actual Weights of Bellanca C-27B." NASM archives.
- Bellanca 66-67 Aircruiser
- Bellanca 66-70
- Bellanca 66-75 Aircruiser
- Bellanca 66-76 Aircruiser
- Bellanca 66-85 Aircruiser
- Bellanca 66-87 Patrol Utility Airplane, Class VPJ - (1939). NASM archives.
- Bellanca 66-90 Patrol Utility Airplane - NASM archives.
- Bellanca 77-140
- Bellanca 77-320 Junior
- Bellanca 77-160
- Bellanca 77-170
- Bellanca Air Sedan
- Bellanca Airbus
- Bellanca Aircruiser
- Bellanca Aries
- Bellanca Aries T-250
- Bellanca Champion
- Bellanca Champion 115
- Bellanca Decathlon
- Bellanca Decathlon CS
- Bellanca Standard
- Bellanca Standard II
- Bellanca Citabria
- Bellanca Citabria Aurora
- Bellanca Cruisair
- Bellanca Cruisair Junior
- Bellanca Cruisemaster
- Bellanca Pacemaker
- Bellanca Scout
- Bellanca Sport
- Bellanca Standard
- Bellanca Standard II
- Bellanca Super Decathlon
- Bellanca Tandem a.k.a. Blue Streak
- Bellanca Tradewind Special
- Bellanca Viking
- Bellanca Super Viking
- Bellanca Turbo Super Viking
- Bellanca 7ACA
- Bellanca 7ECA
- Bellanca 7GCAA
- Bellanca 7GCAB
- Bellanca 7GCBC Scout
- Bellanca 7KCAB
- Bellanca 7GCAA
- Bellanca 7GCAB
- Bellanca 8GCBC Scout
- Bellanca 8KCAB
- Bellanca 150
- Bellanca - Twin Float Monoplane (1935). NASM archives.
- Bellanca 115-200 NASM archives.
- Bellanca 260 SEE 14–19.
- Bellanca 300-W Pacemaker
- Bellanca C-24-100-P - NASM archives.
- Bellanca C-28-140 - NASM archives.
- Bellanca CD
- Bellanca CE
- Bellanca CF
- Bellanca CG - "Preliminary Figures given to Wright in 1925." NASM archives.
- Bellanca CH-200 Pacemaker
- Bellanca CH-300 Pacemaker
- Bellanca CH-300-W Pacemaker
- Bellanca CH-400 Skyrocket
- Bellanca D Skyrocket de Havilland DH-4 Modified - NASM archives.
- Bellanca E Pacemaker 1932
- Bellanca F Skyrocket
- Bellanca J
- Bellanca J-300
- Bellanca J-2 Pacemaker
- Bellanca J2 Tradewind Special
- Bellanca JE 1938
- Bellanca K 1928
- Bellanca KD-300 - NASM archives.
- Bellanca M Transport - NASM archives.
- Bellanca MP-901 Canadian Mailplane - NASM archives.
- Bellanca P
- Bellanca P-100 Airbus
- Bellanca P-200
- Bellanca P-200-A Airbus
- Bellanca P-300 Airbus
- Bellanca PM-300 Pacemaker Freighter
- Bellanca SE Sport (CF)
- Bellanca T-14-14
- Bellanca T-14-15 Trainer - (1948). NASM archives.
- Bellanca TES Tandem aka Blue Streak
- Bellanca C-27
- Bellanca L-11
- Bellanca SOE
- Bellanca SE
- Bellanca RE
- Bellanca P-2 "Army" - NASM archives.
- Bellanca O-50 (Model 49-42)
  - Bellanca YO-50
- Bellanca VF NASM archives.
- Bellanca XC-942 NASM archives.
- Bellanca XPTBH-2 NASM archives.

=== Bellanca ===
(Bellanca Aircraft Engineering Inc.)

- Bellanca Model 25 Skyrocket

=== Bellanger ===
(Bellanger Freres)

- Bellanger-Denhaut 22

=== Bellotti ===
(Anthony Bellotti, New Bedford, MA)

- Bellotti Sport

=== Belohlavek ===
(John (or Joe) Belohlavek Jr, Sierra Madre, CA)

- Belohlavek M-2

=== Beltrame ===
(Quinto Beltrame)

- Beltrame Colibri

=== Beltran ===
(Christian Beltran)

- Beltran SNJ Corsair

=== Belworthy ===
- Belworthy BEL-7 Figaro

=== Belyayev ===
(Viktor Nikolayevich Belyayev)

- Belyayev DB-LK
- Belyayev Babochka
- Belyayev EI
- Belyayev EOI
- Belyayev PI
- Belyayev PBI
- Belyayev BP-3

=== Ben Showers ===
(Showers-Aero, Milton, PA)

- Ben Showers Skytwister

=== Bendix ===
((Vincent) Bendix Products Corp, 401 Bendix Dr, South Bend IN. 1944: Bendix Personal Airplane Div, Detroit MI.)

- Bendix 51
- Bendix 51A
- Bendix 52
- Bendix 55
- Bendix B-S-1
- Bendix Controlwing

=== Bendix ===
(Bendix Helicopters Inc.)

- Bendix Model J
- Bendix model K

=== Beneš-Mráz ===
(Beneš & Mráz Továrna na Letadla)

- Beneš-Mráz Be-50 Beta-Minor (trainer, 1935, serie)
- Beneš-Mráz Be-51 Beta-Minor (1937, Serie)
- Beneš-Mráz Be-52 Beta-Major (1936)
- Beneš-Mráz Be-53
- Beneš-Mráz Be-56 (1936)
- Beneš-Mráz Be-60 Bestiola (1935, Serie)
- Beneš-Mráz Be-150 Beta-Junior (1936, Serie)
- Beneš-Mráz Be-156 (1935)
- Beneš-Mráz Be-250 Beta Major (1936, Serie)
- Beneš-Mráz Be-251 (1938)
- Beneš-Mráz Be-252 Beta-Scolar ( 1937)
- Beneš-Mráz Be-352(1939, Projekt)
- Beneš-Mráz Be-501
- Beneš-Mráz Be-502
- Beneš-Mráz Be-550 Bibi (1936, Serie)
- Beneš-Mráz Be-555 Super Bibi (1938, Serie)
- Mráz K-65 Čáp Fieseler Fi156 copy
- Mráz M-2 Skaut (1948)

=== Bengston ===
- Bengston Fliverette

=== Benner ===
(Reno Benner, Leavittwon PA.)

- Benner Special

=== Bennett ===
(Bennett Aviation / Bennett Aircraft Co)

- Bennett PL-11 Airtruk

=== Bennett ===
((Frank) Bennett Aircraft Co, Fort Worth, TX, 1942: Reorganized as Globe Aircraft Co., a.k.a. Breese-Bennett)

- Bennett BTC-1

=== Bennett ===
(George Bennett, Kansas City, MO)

- Bennett Airliner

=== Bennett ===
(Grover Bennett & Son, Keosauqua, IA)

- Bennett Seraph

=== Bennett ===
(S C Bennett, Bridgewater NC.)

- Bennett 1928 Monoplane

=== Bennett-Christofferson ===
( (Fred A) Bennett-(Silas) Christofferson Airship Co, Portland, OR)

- Bennett-Christofferson 1910 Biplane

=== Benoist ===
(Benoist Aircraft Co,)

- Benoist 1910/1911 Biplane "Benoist Headless"
- Benoist 1912 Biplane
- Benoist 1912 Covered Fuselage Biplane
- Benoist 1912 Tractor Hydro
- Benoist C
- Benoist E
- Benoist Land Tractor Type XII
- Benoist XIII
- Benoist XIV
- Benoist XV
- Benoist XVII

=== Bensen ===
((Dr Igor B) Bensen Aircraft Corp. Raleigh, NC)

- Bensen B-3 "Bensen-General Electric B-3"
- Bensen B-4 Sky Scooter
- Bensen B-5
- Bensen B-6
- Bensen B-7 Gyro-Glider
- Bensen B-7B Gyro-boat
- Bensen B-7M Gyro-Copter
- Bensen B-7W Hydro-Glider
- Bensen B-8 Gyro-Copter
- Bensen B-8 Gyro-Glider
    - Bensen B-8W Hydro-Glider
- Bensen B-9 Little Zipster
- Bensen B-10 Prop-Copter
- Bensen B-11 Gyro-Copter
- Bensen B-12 Sky-Way
- Bensen B-13
- Bensen B-16
- Bensen B-18 Hover-Gyro
- Bensen B-80
- Bensen Super Gyro-Copter
- Bensen Mid-Jet
- Bensen X-25

=== Benson ===
(George C Benson, San Bernardino, CA)

- Benson Jon B Special

=== Bentley ===
(J Frank Bentley, Phoenix, AZ)

- Bentley HB 4-1

=== Bentzen ===
(William Bentzen, IL)

- Bentzen Sport#1

=== Berca ===
(Jorge Berca)

- Berca JB-3
- Berca JB-4

=== Bereznyak-Isayev ===
- Bereznyak-Isayev BI-1

=== Berckmans ===
((Maurice & Emile) Berckmans Airplane Co, New York)

- Berckmans Speed Scout
- Berckmans B-2
- Berckmans B-3

=== Berg & Storm ===
(Berg & Storm / Burmeister & Wain)

- Berg & Storm B&S I
- Berg & Storm B&S II
- Berg & Storm B&S III

=== Bergamaschi ===
(Cantieri Aeronuatici Bergamaschi / CAB)

- Bergamaschi AR-1
- Bergamaschi AR-2
- Bergamaschi AR-10
- Bergamaschi C-1
- Bergamaschi C-2
- Bergamaschi SC-4
- Bergamaschi SC-5
- Bergamaschi CAB.6
- Bergamaschi CAB.7

=== Berger ===
- Berger HB-25
- Berger BX-50
- Berger BX-110
- Berger BX-111
- Berger BX-200
- Berger BX-300

=== Bergier ===
(Henri Bergier)

- Bergier helicopter

=== Beriev ===
- Beriev A-25 four-seat multipurpose amphibious aircraft
- Beriev A-40 large multipurpose amphibious aircraft
- Beriev A-42 prototype SAR variant of the A-40
- Beriev A-44 military patrol version of A-42
- Beriev A-46 high-wing amphibious aircraft project
- Beriev A-50 Shmel, Il-76 modified into an AWACS role
- Beriev A-60 Il-76 converted into an airborne laser laboratory
- Beriev A-70 ultra-heavy amphibian wing-in-ground-effect aircraft project
- Beriev A-100 modified Il-76MD-90 into an AWACS role
- Beriev A-110 small high-wing multipurpose amphibious aircraft project
- Beriev A-150 transoceanic jet-powered assault transport project
- Antonov-Beriev An-Be-20 trijet regional airliner project, developed in partnership with Antonov; cancelled in favor of the Yakovlev Yak-40
- Beriev Be-1 experimental wing-in-ground-effect aircraft
- Beriev Be-2 two-seat reconnaissance seaplane; originally designated KOR-1
- Beriev Be-4 reconnaissance flying boat; originally designated KOR-2
- Beriev Be-5 three-seat, single-engine catapult-launched seaplane; originally designated KOR-3
- Beriev Be-6 multipurpose flying boat
- Beriev Be-8 prototype passenger/liaison floatplane
- Beriev Be-10 (1948) projected amphibious aircraft based on Be-6
- Beriev Be-10 twin-engine jet-powered patrol bomber flying boat
- Beriev Be-12 Chayka (Seagull), maritime patrol flying boat developed from the Be-6
- Beriev Be-14 prototype SAR aircraft based on the Be-12
- Beriev Be-16 heavy military transport project
- Beriev Be-18 military transport project
- Beriev Be-24 amphibious airliner project
- Beriev Be-26 projected amphibious ASW aircraft
- Beriev Be-30 regional airliner/utility transport
- Beriev Be-32 (1976) light multipurpose STOL aircraft project
- Beriev Be-32 (1993) upgraded version of Be-30
- Beriev Be-34 Be-32 with rear cargo door
- Beriev Be-36 Be-32 with wider fuselage
- Beriev Be-40 projected airliner version of A-40
- Beriev Be-101 four-seat, high-wing amphibious aircraft project
- Beriev Be-103 amphibious seaplane
- Beriev Be-105 wing-in-ground-effect aircraft project
- Beriev Be-107 wing-in-ground-effect aircraft project
- Beriev Be-111 multipurpose amphibious aircraft project
- Beriev Be 112 proposed twin-engine multipurpose amphibious aircraft
- Beriev Be-113 multipurpose passenger flying boat project
- Beriev Be-114 high-wing multipurpose amphibious aircraft project
- Beriev Be-115 high-wing small multipurpose amphibious aircraft project
- Beriev Be-132 projected regional airliner developed from the Be-32K
- Beriev Be-200 large multipurpose amphibious aircraft
- Beriev LL-143 prototype twin-engine flying boat; precursor of Be-6
- Beriev MBR-2 multipurpose flying boat
- Beriev MBR-5 prototype short-range reconnaissance seaplane
- Beriev MBR-7 short-range reconnaissance/bomber flying boat
- Beriev MDR-5 prototype long-range reconnaissance/bomber flying boat; lost to the MDR-6
- Beriev Qing-6 PLAAF Be-6s re-engined with WJ-6 engines
- Beriev R-1 turbojet flying boat
- Beriev S-13 Soviet clone of the Lockheed U-2C
- Beriev SA-20P eight-seat version of Be-103

=== Berk ===
(Glenn W Berk, Blissfield, MI)

- Berk GB-1

=== Berkeley ===
(Berkeley Aviation Services Ltd (Fdr: O A Houfe), Berkeley, CA)

- Berkeley Baby Pursuit

=== Berkmans ===
- Berkmans Speed Scout

=== Berkshire ===
(Berkshire Aircraft Co, 91 Brown St, Pittsfield, MA)

- Berkshire Silver Cloud

=== Berkut ===
(Berkut Engineering)

- Berkut 360
- Berkut VL
- Berkut 540
- Berkut FG540
- Berkut Jet
- Berkut Mobius

=== Berlin ===
see:Akaflieg Berlin

=== Berliner-Joyce ===
- Berliner Basic Trainer
- Berliner CM-3
- Berliner CM-4
- Berliner CM-5
- Berliner CM-6 Dragon
- Berliner CM-9 Flying Boat
- Berliner Model D
- Berliner Model E
- Berliner-Joyce 29-1 Commercial
- Berliner-Joyce CM-4
- Berliner-Joyce FJ
- Berliner-Joyce F2J
- Berliner-Joyce XF3J
- Berliner-Joyce OJ
- Berliner-Joyce P-16
- Berliner-Joyce PB-1

=== Berliner Helicopters ===
- Berliner 1907 Single-Bladed Helicopter
- Berliner 1907 Twin-Bladed Helicopter
- Berliner 1913 Helicopter
- Berliner Model D helicopter ca.1920
- Berliner Helicopter ca.1921
- Berliner Triplane Helicopter ca.1923
- Berliner Helicoplane ca.1924

=== Bernard ===
Etablissements Adolphe Bernard

- Bernard AB 1
- Bernard AB 2
- Bernard AB 3
- Bernard AB 4

Société Industrielle des Métaux et du Bois (S.I.M.B.)

- Bernard SIMB AB 10
- Bernard SIMB AB 12
- Bernard SIMB AB 16
- Bernard SIMB V-1
- Bernard SIMB V-2
- Bernard V.1
- Bernard V.2
- Bernard V-4
- Bernard 1
- Bernard 12
- Bernard 14
- Bernard 15

Société des Avions Bernard (S.A.B.)

- Bernard 18
- Bernard 20
- Bernard H.V.40 - single-seat racing seaplane (1931)
- Bernard H.V.41
- Bernard H.V.42 - single-seat racing seaplane (1931)
- Bernard H.52 - single-seat floatplane fighter (1933)
- Bernard 60T
- Bernard 61T
- Bernard 62
- Bernard 70
- Bernard S-72
- Bernard S-73
- Bernard 74
- Bernard 75
- Bernard 80GR
- Bernard 81GR
- Bernard 81 Bn3
- Bernard 82
- Bernard 84GR
- Bernard 86
- Bernard H.110 - single-seat floatplane fighter (1935)
- Bernard H.V.120 - single-seat racing seaplane (1930)
- Bernard 160
- Bernard 190T
- Bernard 191GR
- Bernard 192T
- Bernard 193T
- Bernard 197GR
- Bernard 200T
- Bernard 201T
- Bernard 202T
- Bernard 203T
- Bernard 204T
- Bernard 205T
- Bernard 207T
- Bernard 210T
- Bernard H.V.220 - single-seat racing seaplane (unflown)
- Bernard 260

=== Berry ===
(Harold O Berry, Anderson IN.)

- Berry H-25
- Berry H-45

=== Bert ===
(Floyd S Bert, Carnegie PA.)

- Bert BF-2
- Bert BF-3
- Bert BF-4

=== Bertin ===
(Léonce Bertin)

- Bertin 1907 helicopter
- Bertin helicoplan
- Bertin-Lieber helicopter
- Bertin 1910 monoplane
- Bertin monoplan 1912

=== Besasie ===
(Ray Besasie, Milwaukee WI.)

- Besasie 1932 Monoplane

=== Bessard-Millevoye ===
(Bessard and Millevoye)

- Bessard-Millevoye Moineau

=== Bessière ===
(Gustave Bessière - see: ESTA)

=== Besson ===
(Société de construction aéronautiques et Navales Marcel Besson, 5 rue Saint-Denis, Boulogne-sur-Seine, France)

- Besson 1911 Canard monoplan
- Besson H-3
- Besson H-5
- Besson H-6
- Levy-Besson (aka LB)
- Besson MB.11
- Besson MB.12
- Besson MB.26
- Besson MB.29
- Besson MB.30 to HB.4 specification
- Besson MB.35
- Besson MB.36
- Besson MB.41
- Besson MB.411

=== Best Off ===
- Best Off Nynja
- Best Off Sky Ranger
- Best Off Skyranger Vfun
- Best Off Skyranger Vmax
- Best Off Skyranger Swift

=== Bestetti ===
(Bestetti-Nardi)

- Bestetti BN.1 (sometimes Bestetti-Nardi BN.1)

=== Bessard-Millevoye ===
- Bessard-Millevoye Moineau

=== Betts ===
(Mike Betts)

- Betts Alliance

=== Beville ===
(Steve Beville, Hammond IN.)

- Beville Special

=== Bezobrasov ===
(Aleksander A. Bezobrazov & F.E. Moska)

- Bezobrazov AA triplane

=== Bezzola ===
(Gion Bezzola)

- Bezzola GB-1 Luftibus
- Bezzola GB-2 Retro
