= EOI =

EOI may refer to:

== Economics and commerce ==
- Economic Opportunity Institute, an American public policy think tank
- Export-oriented industrialization
- Expression of interest

== Other uses ==
- European Ombudsman Institute
- Belyayev EOI, a Soviet fighter aircraft
- Eday Airport, in Orkney, Scotland
- EOI Business School, in Spain
- End of interrupt, a computer signal
- Escuela Oficial de Idiomas, a Spanish network of language schools
- Exhaust over intake, a type of combustion engine

== See also ==
- Encyclopaedia of Islam (EI)
