= BO3 =

BO3 or variant may refer to:

- Borate (boron trioxide) BO_{3}
- Call of Duty: Black Ops III
- Bo.3, see List of aircraft (B)#Borel
- BO3 in IAU Minor Planet
- Acronym for “best of 3” (sports)

== See also ==
- Bo-Bo-Bo
- 3BO FM
