= Bellanca Skyrocket =

The Skyrocket name was used by Bellanca for a number of different aircraft:

- the Bellanca CH-400 Skyrocket
- the Bellanca D Skyrocket
- the Bellanca F Skyrocket
- the Bellanca F-1 Skyrocket
- the Bellanca F-2 Skyrocket

as well as:

- the Bellanca 19-25 Skyrocket II
- the Bellanca 31-50 and 31-55 Skyrocket Senior
