= Bernard 200 =

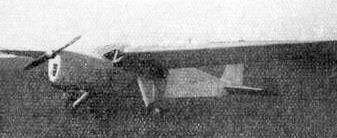
- 201 T

General information
- Type: 3-4 seat touring aircraft
- National origin: France
- Manufacturer: Société des Avions Bernard (S.A.B.)
- Designer: Sigismond-Georges Bruner
- Number built: 4

History
- First flight: 1 December 1932

The Bernard 200 T (T for Tourisme) was the first of a series of French light touring aircraft from the early 1930s. Single engined and seating three or four, they were high cantilever wing monoplanes. Four Bernard 200 T were built and subsequently modified into three further variants.

== Design and development ==
The Bernard 200s were the company's only attempt to break into the growing 1930s market for touring aircraft. They were clean, single-engine, cantilever high-wing aircraft with a cabin carefully thought out for potential buyers.

In plan the wings had straight leading edges and taper on the trailing edges. They were metal structures, built around twin spars and fabric-covered. Full-span ailerons were fitted, with flaps built into the innermost 1.5 m (4 ft 11 in). The tail surfaces were straight-edged, swept only on their leading edges; their control surfaces were all horn balanced and fitted with trim tabs. The square-section, flat-sided fuselage behind the cabin was built around four dural longerons, fabric-covered and tapering rearwards.

The cabin area had a welded steel structure and was dural clad. There were doors on either side for access to the two front seats and a third door, on the port side, to a single rear seat; the fuselage was close enough to the ground to allow even the front-seat occupants to enter the cabin without a step. The cabin, 2 m (6 ft 7 in) long, 1 m (3 ft 3 in) wide and 1.2 m (3 ft 11 in) high, was lit by two pairs of side windows and by three cabin-length, cellon-covered roof windows. The instrument panel was well equipped and the cabin interior styled in the manner of a luxury car of the period. There was an internally accessible space for luggage behind the cabin.

The Bernard 200 T was powered by a 89 kW (120 hp) de Havilland Gipsy III inverted four-cylinder air-cooled piston engine, driving a two-blade propeller, housed under a latched dural cowling which opened like a car bonnet. Its fixed tailwheel undercarriage had aerodynamically clean, cantilever main legs, each built from a single, tapered girder with fairings added to its leading and trailing edges. These legs were mounted on the fuselage immediately behind the front doors and at window-sill height, with pneumatic dampers inside the cabin behind the front seats; this arrangement led to the low fuselage and easy access.

== Operational history ==
The Bernard 200 T flew for the first time on 1 December 1932, piloted by Roger Baptiste at Villacoublay. At the same time the second prototype was on display on the Bernard stand at the 13th Salon de l'Aéronautique, held at the Grand Palais in Paris. Baptiste was killed in March 1933 during an aerobatic demonstration of the 201 T, first flown that January, a crash caused by wing flutter.

Before this accident, Bernard had hopes of an order for 25 201 aircraft from the Armée de l'Air but this was not concluded. The surviving three 200 series aircraft mostly flew with private owners, though one was owned for a time by the Ardèche aero club. At least one remained in operation to mid-1939. One 207 was prepared 1933 for a flight across Africa via Madagascar to the Cape of Good Hope. F-AMGS reached Niger but at that point the leader, René Marchessseau, had to return to France for personal reasons and the aircraft followed, flown by his companions. In 1934 the other 207, F-AMOS, also flew to Africa in the company of two other aircraft from the Aero Club of Oran, travelling some 8,000 km (5,000 mi) to Niger. This aircraft had previously flown in the Angers 12 hour endurance event held in early July 1933, though it was only placed 12th out of 17 after covering 1,824 km (1,133 mi) at an average speed of 152 km/h (94 mph).

== Variants ==
Data from Liron'

200 T
89 kW (120 hp) de Havilland Gipsy III 3 seats. 4 built
200 TS
As 200 T but with leading edge slats.
201 T
97 kW (130 hp) de Havilland Gipsy Major I engine. 3 seats. 2 converted from 200 Ts. First flew 12 January 1933.
202 T
Unbuilt variant with 75 kW (101 hp) Chaise 4A engine.
203 T
Unbuilt variant with 90 kW (120 hp) Chaise 4B engine.
204 T
Unbuilt variant with 90 kW (120 hp) Renault 4P engine
205 T
As 201 T with 4 seats and 3-blade propeller. 1 converted from 201 T.
207 T
As 205 T with strengthened wing and equipped for greater range; minor weight increase. 2-blade propeller. 2 converted from 201 Ts.
210 T
Unbuilt variant with a 100 kW (140 hp) de Havilland Gipsy Major Ic engine. 4 seats, aimed at British market.
510 T
Unbuilt 3 seat variant of 210 T with 101 kW (135 hp) de Havilland Gipsy Major I engine.

== Specifications (201 T) ==
Data from Liron

General characteristics

- Capacity: 3
- Length: 8.18 m (26 ft 10 in)
- Wingspan: 11.9 m (39 ft 1 in)
- Height: 2.00 m (6 ft 7 in)
- Wing area: 17.00 m^{2} (183.0 sq ft)
- Empty weight: 690 kg (1,521 lb)
- Gross weight: 1,030 kg (2,271 lb)
- Powerplant: 1 × de Havilland Gipsy Major III 4-cylinder inverted, air-cooled inline engine, 101 kW (135 hp)
- Propellers: 2-bladed

Performance

- Maximum speed: 193 km/h (120 mph, 104 kn)
- Range: 700 km (430 mi, 380 nmi)
- Service ceiling: 5,500 m (18,000 ft)
- Lift-to-drag: 14.5

== Bibliography ==
- Liron, Jean (1990). Les avions Bernard. Collection Docavia. Vol. 31. Paris: Éditions Larivière. ISBN 2-84890-065-2.
