= Grudieaire GH-4 =

Autogyro

GH-4

General information
- Type: Autogyro
- National origin: United States
- Designer: Grudieaire

The Grudieaire GH-4 is an American autogyro that was designed for homebuilt construction.

== Design and development ==
The GH-4 is a single seat autogyro constructed of welded steel tubing with aircraft fabric covering. The GH-4 uses Timken roller bearings and spruce wood core rotor blades with composite covering.

== Variants ==
Grudieaire GH-4
Homebuilt
Vortech B20

== Specifications (GH-4) ==
Data from Air Progress

General characteristics

- Crew: 1
- Length: 10 ft 2 in (3.10 m)
- Height: 7 ft 1 in (2.16 m)
- Empty weight: 240 lb (109 kg)
- Gross weight: 450 lb (204 kg)
- Fuel capacity: 5 U.S. gallons (19 L; 4.2 imp gal)
- Main rotor diameter: × 20 ft 4 in (6.20 m)

Performance

- Maximum speed: 65 kn (75 mph, 121 km/h)
- Cruise speed: 48 kn (55 mph, 89 km/h)
- Range: 61 nmi (70 mi, 110 km)
- Rate of climb: 1,650 ft/min (8.4 m/s)

== See also ==
Aircraft of comparable role, configuration, and era

- Bannick Model T of the Air
