= Bellanca Pacemaker =

The Pacemaker name was applied to a number of related Bellanca aircraft in the 1920s and 1930s:

- Bellanca CH-200 Pacemaker
- Bellanca CH-300 Pacemaker
- Bellanca 31-40 and 31-42 Pacemaker Senior
- Bellanca 300W Pacemaker
- Bellanca E Pacemaker
