= Bellanger-Denhaut 22 =

- the Bellanger-Denhaut 22 before a test flight in Hauts-de-Seine, France

General information
- Type: Bomber/reconnaissance flying boat
- National origin: France
- Manufacturer: Bellanger
- Designer: François Denhaut
- Number built: 5+

The Bellanger-Denhaut 22 (sometimes known by the military designation Bellanger-Denhaut HB.3) was a 1920s twin-engined bomber/reconnaissance flying boat designed by François Denhaut the technical director for seaplanes for the car manufacturer Bellanger.

== Design and development ==
The B-D 22 was an unequal span biplane powered by two 260 hp (194 kW) Hispano-Suiza 8Fd inline piston engines. It had an open cockpit forward of the wings for the pilot and co-pilot to sit side-by-side and gunner's positions midships and at the bow and the wings could be folded for stowage. The French Naval aviation ordered five and designated them as the HB.3 although they appear to have been little used. A commercial transport version was developed with the gunner's positions removed and a cabin for six passengers installed behind the pilot's cockpit.

== Operators ==
France

- French Navy five as the HB.3

== Specifications (B-D 22) ==
Data from Illustrated Encyclopedia of Aircraft, Aviafrance:Bellanger-Denhaut BD-22, Jane's all the World's Aircraft 1924

General characteristics

- Crew: 3/4
- Length: 14.70 m (48 ft 3 in)
- Upper wingspan: 19.00 m (62 ft 4 in)
- Lower wingspan: 16 m (52 ft 6 in)
- Height: 4.60 m (15 ft 1 in)
- Wing area: 75.2 m^{2} (809 sq ft)
- Empty weight: 2,050 kg (4,519 lb)
- Gross weight: 3,475 kg (7,661 lb)
- Powerplant: 2 × Hispano-Suiza 8Fd V-8 water-cooled piston engines, 190 kW (260 hp) each
- Propellers: 2-bladed fixed-pitch propellers

Performance

- Maximum speed: 170 km/h (110 mph, 92 kn)
- Range: 1,000 km (620 mi, 540 nmi)
- Service ceiling: 5,400 m (17,700 ft)
- Wing loading: 45.5 kg/m^{2} (9.3 lb/sq ft)
- Power/mass: 0.1126 kW/kg (0.0685 hp/lb)

Armament

- Guns: two ring-mounted 7.7 mm (0.303 in) machine guns, one at bow and one midships
- Bombs: bomb-racks fitted under wing

== See also ==
Related lists

- List of flying boats and floatplanes
