= Besson MB.36 =

French monoplane flying-boat

MB.36
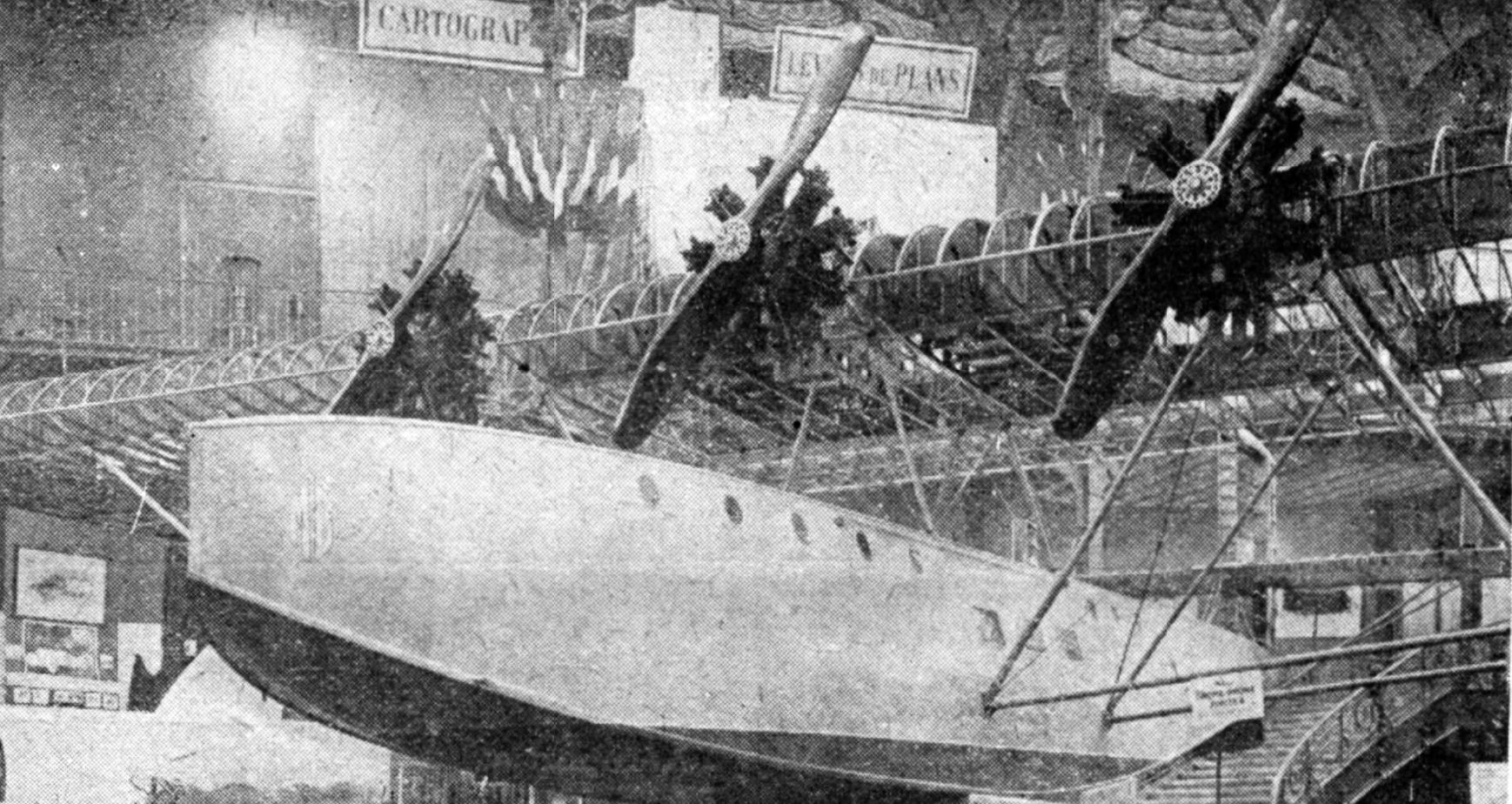

General information
- Type: Transport flying-boat
- National origin: France
- Manufacturer: Besson
- Designer: Marcel Besson
- Number built: 1

History
- First flight: 15 May 1930

The Besson MB.36 was a French monoplane flying-boat designed by Marcel Besson, only one was built.

== Design and development ==
The MB.36 was a parasol-wing monoplane flying-boat for use as either a bomber or commercial transport. It was powered by three 420 hp (313 kW) Gnome-Rhône 9Ad Jupiter radial engines. The prototype, registered F-AKEJ, was a 10-seat commercial variant, designed in 1926 but did not fly until 15 May 1930 because of financial difficulties. By the time of the MB.36 first flight, the company had been taken over by the ANF Mureaux company. After the flying-boat lost a stabilizing float during official tests, and because of poor performance the project was abandoned and the MB.36 scrapped.

== Specifications ==
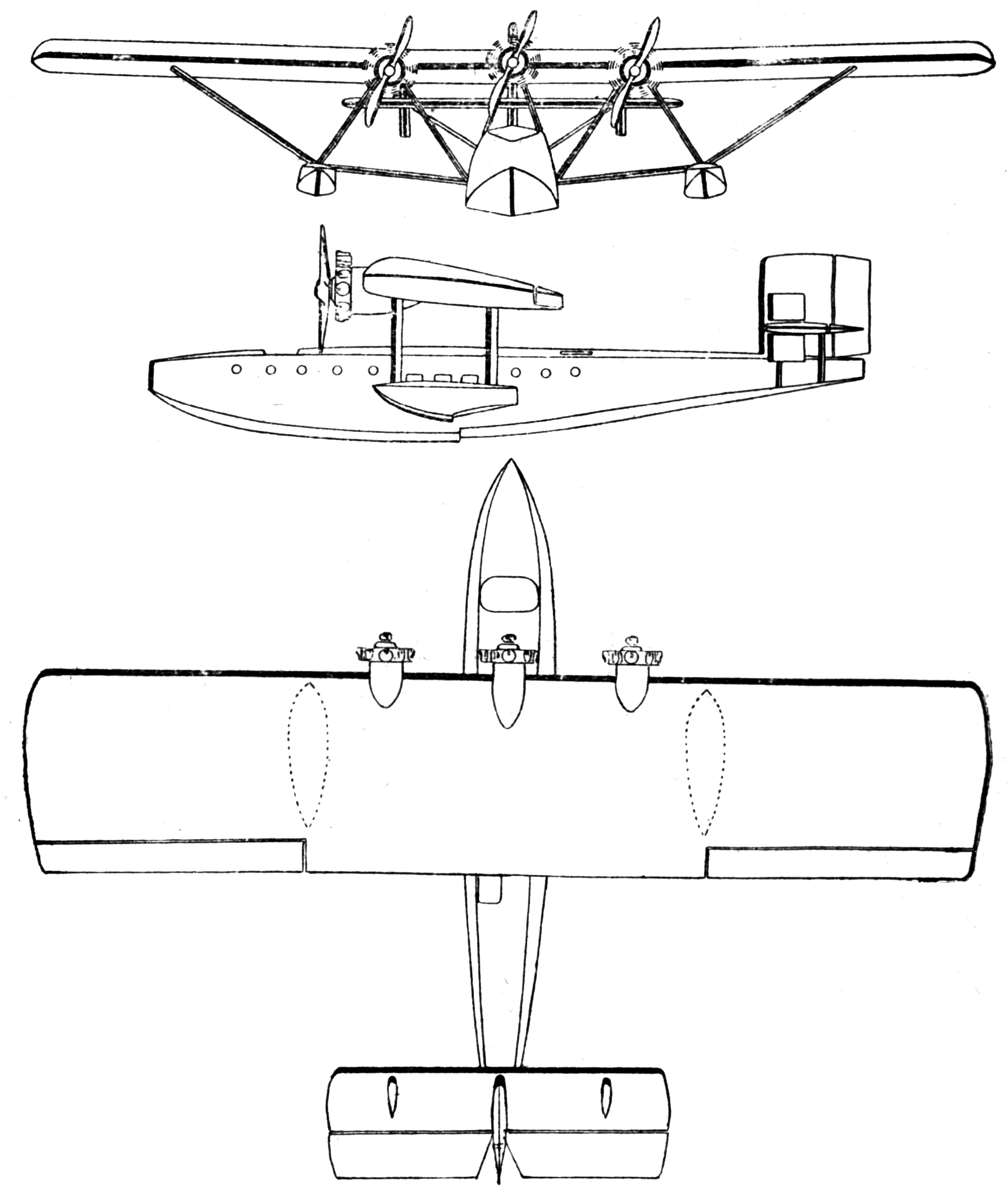
Besson MB 36 3-view drawing from Les Ailes September 1, 1927

Data from The Illustrated Encyclopedia of Aircraft

General characteristics

- Length: 18.75 m (61 ft 6.25 in)
- Wingspan: 25.00 m (82 ft 0.25 in)
- Height: 4.70 m (15 ft 5 in)
- Wing area: 130.00 m^{2} (1,339.35 sq ft)
- Empty weight: 4,870 kg (10,737 lb)
- Gross weight: 7,735 kg (17,035 lb)
- Powerplant: 3 × Gnome-Rhône 9Ad radial piston engine , 313 kW (420 hp) each

Performance

- Maximum speed: 185 km/h (115 mph, 100 kn)
- Range: 1,060 km (659 mi, 573 nmi)

== See also ==
Related lists

- List of flying boats and floatplanes
