= Bensen B-7 =

B-7
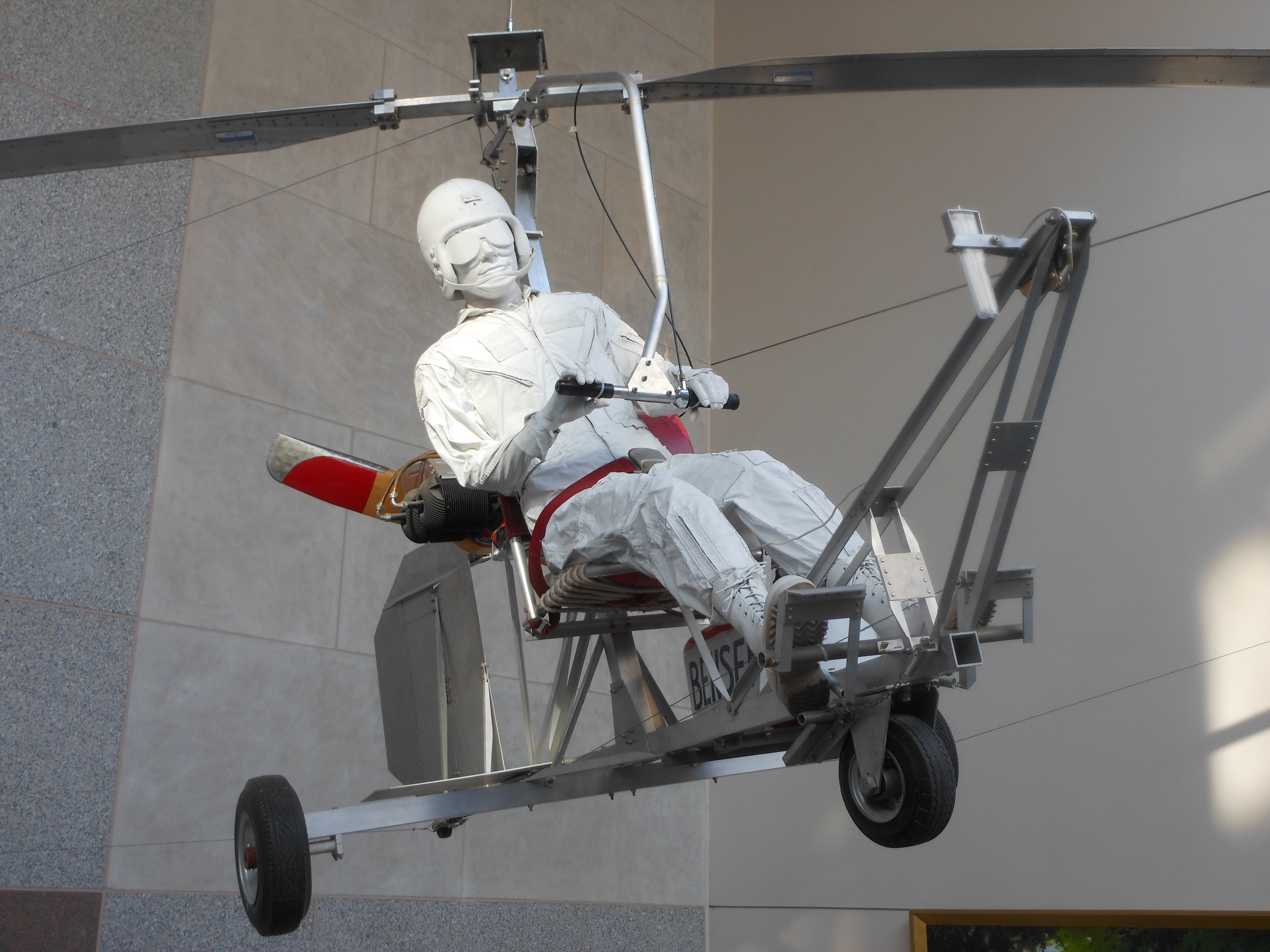

General information
- Type: Recreational rotor kite (Gyroglider)/autogyro
- National origin: USA
- Manufacturer: Bensen Aircraft for homebuilding
- Designer: Igor Bensen

History
- First flight: 17 June 1955

The Bensen B-7 was a small rotor kite developed by Igor Bensen in the United States in the 1950s and marketed for home building. It was a refined to be a slightly larger version of the B-6, replacing the skids with a tricycle undercarriage, and adding a single large fin to the rear of the aircraft.

The B-7 was first towed aloft on 17 June 1955, and on 6 December that year, Bensen flew a motorized version designated the B-7M, a fully autonomous autogyro. The prototype B-7M crashed three days later with Bensen at the controls. Although the machine was soon repaired and in the air again, the incident set Bensen to work on further refinements to the design that would eventually lead to the B-8.

== Variants ==
Data from: Jane's All the World's Aircraft 1958-59

B-7
The basic gyro-glider
B-7B Gyro-boat
A Gyro-glider mounted on a standard sailing dinghy hull.
B-7W Hydro-glider
The B-7W "Hydroglider" was a gyrocopter designed to be towed from a motorboat at 10-20 mph. The B-7W was tested at Cypress Gardens Florida in 1955. It was marketed to be a sport vehicle, with practical uses in fish or submarine spotting. The floats were modified from a Republic Seabee.
B-7M
A powered version of the B-7 with a Nelson H-59 4-cylinder 2-stroke horizontally opposed engine driving a pusher propeller, mounted behind the pilot.

== Specifications (B-7M) ==
Data from Jane's All the World's Aircraft 1958-59

General characteristics

- Crew: 1
- Length: 8 ft 0 in (2.44 m)
- Height: 5 ft 4 in (1.63 m)
- Empty weight: 185 lb (84 kg)
- Gross weight: 435 lb (197 kg)
- Fuel capacity: 6 US gal (5.0 imp gal; 22.7 L)
- Powerplant: 1 × Nelson H-59 4-cylinder air-cooled 2-stroke horizontally-opposed piston engine, 42 hp (31 kW)
- Main rotor diameter: 20 ft 6 in (6.25 m)
- Main rotor area: 330.1 sq ft (30.67 m^{2}) free-turning
- Blade section: Bensen G2
- Propellers: 2-bladed fixed-pitch pusher propeller

Performance

- Maximum speed: 136 mph (219 km/h, 118 kn)
- Cruise speed: 60 mph (97 km/h, 52 kn)
- Minimum speed: 19 mph (17 kn; 31 km/h) in still air
- Range: 120 mi (190 km, 100 nmi)
- Service ceiling: 12,500 ft (3,800 m)
- Rate of climb: 1,000 ft/min (5.1 m/s)
