= Bessard-Millevoye Moineau =

Moineau
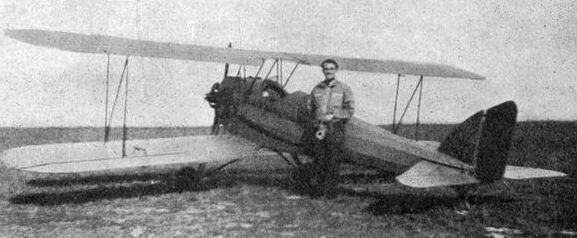

General information
- Type: Single seat sport and trainer aircraft
- National origin: France
- Manufacturer: Bessard and Millevoye
- Designer: Bessard and Millevoye
- Number built: 1

History
- First flight: May-June 1935

Bessard-Millevoye Moineau (Sparrow) was a single seat, low-powered French biplane intended to increase participation in popular aviation. Only one was built.

== Design ==
The single seat Moineau was designed to lower the costs of flying. It was low-powered, making it relatively cheap to build and run, and folding wings made it compact to store. It was capable of being flown by part-time pilots but also able, in more experienced hands, to perform aerobatics.

The Moineau was an equal span single bay biplane with bays defined by N-form interplane struts and wings with only slight stagger. The wings were built around two spruce tubes and had trellissed ribs and plywood leading edges. The lower wing was in two parts and attached to the lower fuselage; the three part upper wing had a short span, reduced chord centre section which was supported over the central fuselage on a tube steel cabane assisted by outward leaning N-form struts from mid-fuselage to the wing and slender forward interplane struts close to the fuselage. Both wings were strongly swept at 20° but only the upper wing had slight (about 1°) dihedral. Apart from the upper centre section the wings had constant and equal chord out to rounded tips. Only the lower wing carried ailerons.

The fuselage was built around four steel tube longerons with frames and diagonals. Spruce stringers and a canvas covering gave the outer fuselage ten faces forming only slightly curved sides and underside but a more rounded upper surface; the fuselage narrowed to the tail. The details of the nose would have depended on the choice of 30 kW (40 hp) engine fitted: options were the two cylinder Centaure, three cylinder Poinsard or four cylinder, inverted in-line Train 4T, though it is not known if the Moineau flew with any of these. The prototype was fitted with a 26 kW (35 hp) Mengin B flat twin, which resulted in a rather blunt nose with engine cylinders exposed for cooling. Its single seat, open cockpit was under the upper wing cut-out, immediately aft of the engine firewall and over the fuel tank; just behind it the upper fuselage was metal covered, part of it easily removable for access and also forming a streamlined headrest. At the rear a triangular tailplane carried unbalanced elevators with a cut-out for the movement of a large balanced rudder which together with a small fin formed a blunted quadrant.

The Moineau had a fixed, wide track, tailskid undercarriage, with large, low pressure balloon tyres on half-axles formed on each side by three struts, a forward pair from the lower and mid-fuselage and a drag strut to the lower fuselage further aft.

== Development ==
The Bessard-Millevoye Moineau first flew in late May or early June 1935 at Toussus-Paris, piloted by Henri Déricourt, chief test pilot of the Paris Aero Club. By mid-July he had demonstrated its aerobatic capabilities. The French aviation journals contain no further references to the Moineau.

== Specifications (Train 4T) ==
Data from Les Ailes 15 August 1935

General characteristics

- Crew: One
- Length: 5.10 m (16 ft 9 in)
- Wingspan: 7.0 m (23 ft 0 in)
- Width: 2.30 m (7 ft 7 in) wings folded
- Wing area: 12 m^{2} (130 sq ft)
- Empty weight: 190 kg (419 lb)
- Gross weight: 312 kg (688 lb)
- Powerplant: 1 × Train 4T 4-cylinder inverted in-line, 30 kW (40 hp)
- Propellers: 2-bladed
- Les Ailes does not specify engine except by power; since trials were with a 26 kW (35 hp) Mengin B engine, performance may have been extrapolated and weights may be a little different.

Performance

- Maximum speed: 130 km/h (81 mph, 70 kn) at ground level
- Range: 350 km (220 mi, 190 nmi)
- Endurance: 3 hr
- Service ceiling: 3,500 m (11,500 ft) practical
- Take-off speed: 55 km/h (34 mph)
- Landing speed: 50 km/h (31 mph)
