= Barbaro RB-50 =

General information
- Type: Two seat homebuilt light aircraft
- National origin: France
- Designer: René Barbaro
- Primary user: Toulouse Aero Club
- Number built: 1

History
- First flight: 9 October 1960

The Barbaro RB-50 was a small, French, high wing single engine light aircraft, amateur built in the 1960s. Only one was completed.

== Design and development ==
René Barbaro was a test flight engineer with Sud Aviation who designed, built and flew several aircraft in the 1960s and early 1970s. Most of these were single engine light aircraft, though he died in July 1972 flying his only twin engine design, the Barbaro RB.70. The Aéro-Club Airbus France Toulouse René Barbaro bears his name.

The RB-50 was of mixed construction. It had a high-mounted, wooden-structured, cantilever wing with a trapezoidal plan, built around a single spar and fabric-covered. Ailerons and slotted flaps filled the wing trailing edges. The flaps were mechanically operated, with a maximum deflection of 37°.

It was powered by a nose-mounted 67 kW (90 hp) Continental C90 air-cooled flat-four engine, driving a two-blade, fixed-pitch propeller. The forward and central sections of the fuselage were formed from a riveted light alloy girder frame with a metal skin. The centre section contained the fuel tank, which was an integral part of the structure supporting the seats and also, indirectly, the main wheel legs of the conventional, tail wheel undercarriage. Short, horizontal aerofoiled extensions from the front of the tank positioned these short, vertical legs safely beyond the cabin and tank, at the same time increasing the undercarriage track. The two occupants sat side by side under the wing leading edge with dual control columns unusually suspended from the roof for ease of access. The cabin had a single-piece windscreen and three separate windows, decreasing in size rearwards, on each side; on the port side the forward window was part of a large door.

The rear fuselage was a wooden semi-monocoque which dropped down behind the cabin. The RB-50's tail unit was also all-wooden, with a cantilever tailplane mounted on top of the fuselage. The port elevator carried a trim tab. Its fin had a swept, straight leading edge, leading to a rounded top and an unbalanced rudder, also tapered with a slightly curved trailing edge and extending down to the keel. The tail wheel was strut-mounted to the extreme rear fuselage.

According to Gaillard, the RB-50 flew for the first time on 9 October 1960, though Chillon suggests 9 October 1963. It was registered on 30 July 1964 to the Toulouse Aero Club. Little is known about the modifications that were made that led to a new type number, RB-51. Gaillard suggests this happened in 1963, but the record gives the name change date as May 1969. The Certificate of Airworthiness was suspended on 30 March 1970, then removed, and the aircraft's record marked destroyed.

== Variants ==
RB-50
Original version
RB-51
Original aircraft modified

== Specifications (RB-50) ==
Data from Jane's All the World's Aircraft 1966/1967, p.33

General characteristics

- Capacity: Two
- Length: 6.27 m (20 ft 7 in)
- Wingspan: 8.50 m (27 ft 11 in)
- Wing area: 9.70 m^{2} (104.4 sq ft)
- Empty weight: 380 kg (838 lb)
- Max takeoff weight: 6.25 kg (14 lb)
- Powerplant: 1 × Continental C90 air-cooled flat-four engine, 67 kW (90 hp)
- Propellers: 2-bladed , fixed pitch

Performance

- Cruise speed: 190 km/h (120 mph, 100 kn) at 1,500 m (4,921 ft)
- Range: 850 km (530 mi, 460 nmi) with maximum fuel
- Take-off run: 300 m (984 ft)
