= Baker Supercat =

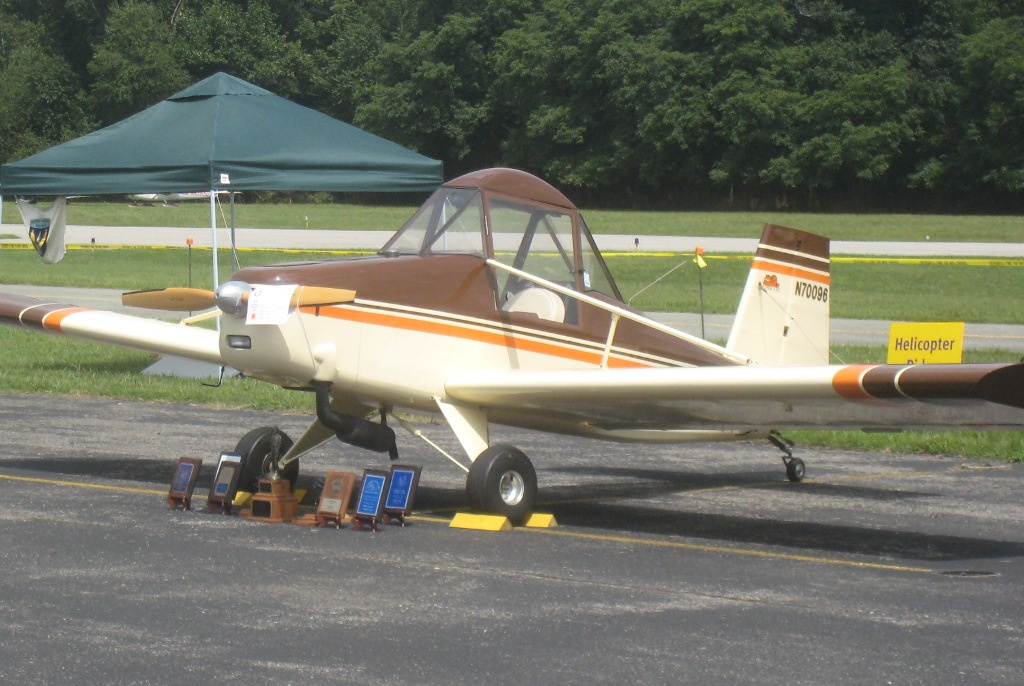
- Supercat at College Park Airport 100th anniversary

General information
- Type: Homebuilt aircraft
- National origin: United States
- Designer: Bobby Baker

History
- Introduction date: 1984

The Baker Bobcat and the follow-on Baker Supercat are American homebuilt aircraft that were designed by Bobby Baker.

== Design and development ==
The Baker Supercat is a low-wing, strut-braced, open cockpit, conventional landing gear-equipped aircraft with all-wooden construction. The aircraft was originally designed to be an ultralight aircraft and the wings are removable. In 1994 Bowdler Aviation purchased the rights to the plans.

== Operational history ==
In 1994, an enclosed Supercat with a modified NACA 4415 airfoil and an inverted 50 hp (37 kW) Rotax 503 installation engine was awarded Grand Champion Light Plane at the EAA AirVenture Oshkosh airshow.

== Variants ==
Baker Bobcat
Ultralight version powered by a KFM 107 engine and without wing struts
Baker Supercat
Development version

== Specifications (Baker Supercat) ==
Data from Sport Aviation, Ultralight News

General characteristics

- Crew: one
- Length: 15 ft 8 in (4.78 m)
- Wingspan: 27 ft 4 in (8.33 m)
- Wing area: 108 sq ft (10.0 m^{2})
- Empty weight: 325 lb (147 kg)
- Fuel capacity: 8 U.S. gallons (30 L; 6.7 imp gal)
- Powerplant: 1 × Rotax 503 Twin cylinder, two-stroke aircraft engine, 50 hp (37 kW)

Performance

- Cruise speed: 65 kn (75 mph, 121 km/h)
- Stall speed: 26 kn (30 mph, 48 km/h)
- Never exceed speed: 83 kn (95 mph, 153 km/h)
- Range: 120 nmi (140 mi, 230 km)
- Rate of climb: 900 ft/min (4.6 m/s)

== See also ==
Aircraft of comparable role, configuration, and era

- Evans VP-1 Volksplane
- Mini-MAX
