= Bell XH-15 =

1948 utility helicopter prototype

XR-15/XH-15

General information
- Type: Four-seat utility helicopter
- National origin: United States
- Manufacturer: Bell Helicopter
- Status: Canceled
- Primary user: United States Air Force
- Number built: 3

History
- First flight: 1948

The Bell XH-15 (Bell Model 54) was an American two-seat utility helicopter designed and built by Bell Helicopter, to meet a requirement for a liaison and utility helicopter for the United States Army and United States Air Force.

== Development ==
The Model 54 was a conventional pod-and-boom four-seat helicopter with wheeled, fixed tricycle landing gear, powered by a single 275 hp Continental XO-470-5 piston engine located in the rear cabin, driving a single two-bladed rotor. The United States Army Air Forces (USAAF) ordered three in February 1946 as the XR-15. The first flight was made in March 1948 with the new designation XH-15, but no orders were forthcoming following evaluation by the United States Air Force (USAF) and the project ended in 1950.

== Variants ==
XR-15
Military designation for three Model 54s ordered for evaluation.
XH-15
XR-15 redesignated before delivery.

== Operators ==
United States

- United States Air Force

== Specifications ==
Data from Bell Aircraft since 1935

General characteristics

- Crew: two
- Capacity: two passengers
- Length: 44 ft 9 in (13.64 m) (overall length)
- Height: 8 ft 1 1/2 in (2.48 m)
- Max takeoff weight: 2,800 lb (1,270 kg)
- Powerplant: 1 × Continental XO-470-5 piston engine, 275 hp (205 kW)
- Main rotor diameter: 37 ft 4 in (11.38 m)

Performance

- Maximum speed: 105 mph (169 km/h, 91 kn)
- Range: 200 mi (320 km, 170 nmi)
- Service ceiling: 20,000 ft (6,100 m) (absolute ceiling)

== See also ==
Related lists

- List of helicopters
