= Back Bone =

French aircraft manufacturer

- Company type: Privately held company
- Industry: Aerospace
- Founder: Thierry Simonet
- Defunct: before 2015
- Headquarters: Tallard, France
- Products: Paramotors

Back Bone was a French aircraft manufacturer based in Tallard and founded by Thierry Simonet. The company specialized in the design and manufacture of paramotors in the form of ready-to-fly aircraft for the US FAR 103 Ultralight Vehicles rules and the European microlight regulations.

The company was active in the mid-2000s, but seems to have gone out of business by 2015.

The company produced a line of paramotors that included the Seraph, Shadow and Silver models.

== Aircraft ==
Summary of aircraft built by Back Bone
Model name	First flight	Number built	Type
Back Bone Seraph	2000s		Paramotor
Back Bone Shadow	2000s		Paramotor
Back Bone Silver	2000s		Paramotor
