= Chaise 4B =

1930s aircraft engine

- Type: Inverted air-cooled V4 piston engine
- National origin: France
- Manufacturer: Societe Anonyme Omnium Metallurgique et Industriel

The Chaise 4B is an aircraft engine designed and built in France during the 1930s, unusual in being an inverted air-cooled 14º V4.

== Design and development ==
During the early 1930s Societe Anonyme Omnium Metallurgique et Industriel / Etablissements Chaise et Cie, commonly known as Moteurs Chaise, designed and produced a compact lightweight four-cylinder aircraft engine developing 130–155 hp (97–116 kW). To reduce overall dimensions and length of crankshaft Chaise designed an inverted V4 with a very small vee angle of 14º. With staggered banks the 4B was both narrow and short.

The light alloy (R.R.50) crankcase supported the major components of the engine. Heat treated steel cylinders were bolted to the crankcase and light alloy (R.R.50) cylinder heads were screwed onto the barrels. Accessories were mounted at the rear with magnetos driven by camshafts running either side of the crankcase, which also operated the valves by pushrods and rocker arms with triple concentric return springs.

== Variants ==
4B
Standard production engine
4Ba
the 4B with improvements

== Specifications (4B) ==
Data from Le moteur Chaise 4-B 4 cylindres inversés

=== General characteristics ===
- Type: air-cooled inverted 14º V4
- Bore: 125 mm (4.9 in)
- Stroke: 140 mm (5.5 in)
- Displacement: 7 L (430 cu in)
- Length: 660 mm (26 in)
- Width: 480 mm (19 in)
- Dry weight: 135 kg (298 lb)

=== Components ===
- Cooling system: Air

=== Performance ===
- Power output: 130 hp (97 kW) at 2100 rpm, 155 hp (116 kW) at 2300 rpm
