= Bannick Model T of the Air =

Model T

General information
- Type: Autogyro
- National origin: United States
- Designer: Lester J. Bannick

The Bannick Model T of the Air was the first of series of homebuilt autogyro designs.

== Design and development ==
The Bannick Copter is a homebuilt autogyro design of the early 1960s similar to the more popular Bensen B-8 design. The airframe is constructed of aluminum tubing with a tricycle landing gear.

== Variants ==
Bannick Model T of the Air
65 hp (48 kW) Lycoming O-145B single place
Bannick Model C Copter
125 hp (93 kW) two place with fiberglass streamlining
Bannick Model VW Copter
Volkswagen air-cooled engine version

== Specifications (Bannick 125hp two place) ==
Data from Air Progress

General characteristics

- Crew: one
- Capacity: one passenger
- Length: 10 ft 5 in (3.18 m)
- Height: 7 ft 4 in (2.24 m)
- Empty weight: 352 lb (160 kg)
- Gross weight: 800 lb (363 kg)
- Fuel capacity: 8 U.S. gallons (30 L; 6.7 imp gal)
- Powerplant: 1 × Lycoming horizontally opposed piston aircraft engine
- Main rotor diameter: 2 × 26 ft 8 in (8.13 m)

Performance

- Maximum speed: 70 kn (80 mph, 130 km/h)
- Cruise speed: 52 kn (60 mph, 97 km/h)
- Rate of climb: 900 ft/min (4.6 m/s)

== See also ==
Aircraft of comparable role, configuration, and era

- Grudieaire GH-4
