= Barnhart Twin 15 =

Twin 15 "Wampus-Kat"
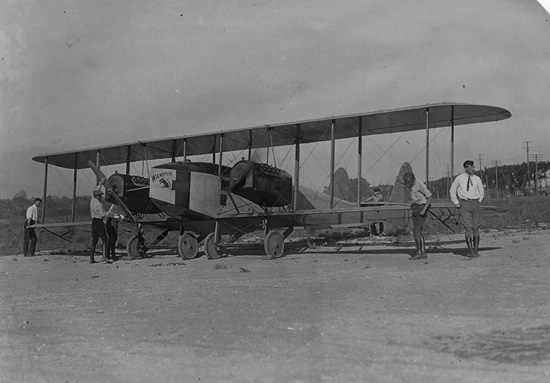

General information
- Type: Biplane
- National origin: United States of America
- Manufacturer: C.R. Little Aircraft Works
- Designer: G. Edward Barnhart
- Number built: 1

History
- First flight: 1921

The Barnhart Twin 15 "Wampus-Kat" was a twin engine biplane built in 1920.

== Design and development ==
The prototype was built in Pasadena, California in 1920 by G.E. Barnhart, an engineer for the Handley Page program.

The "Wampus-Kat" was a twin engine conventional landing gear-equipped biplane with folding wings. There were ailerons on both upper and lower wings. The wooden fuselage had a small nose-mounted door that allowed access for four passengers inside and one pilot in an open cockpit above. All surfaces were fabric covered except the cabin. The main fuel tank was below the fuselage with a small gravity feeder tank.

== Operational history ==
The Wampus-Kat was christened with a spray of roses in Pasadena in August 1921. Four passengers flew in a flight demonstration. It was wrecked in a windstorm at the (Altadena golf course) Makepeace Airport in California. Financing for a rebuild was not obtained, and further development stopped.

== Specifications (Barnhart Twin "Wampus-Kat") ==
Data from Flight: THE BARNHART TWIN 15 "WAMPUS-KAT, Aerofiles BA

General characteristics

- Crew: 1
- Capacity: 4 pax / 1,404 lb (637 kg)
- Length: 30 ft 10 in (9.40 m)
- Wingspan: 50 ft (15 m)
- Width: 22 ft (6.7 m) wings folded
- Height: 11 ft (3.4 m)
- Wing area: 484.9 sq ft (45.05 m^{2})
- Airfoil: R.A.F. 6A
- Empty weight: 2,611 lb (1,184 kg)
- Gross weight: 4,015 lb (1,821 kg)
- Fuel capacity: fuel and oil 540 lb (240 kg)
- Powerplant: 2 × Curtiss OX-5 V-8 water-cooled piston engines, 90 hp (67 kW) each
- Propellers: 2-bladed fixed pitch propellers

Performance

- Maximum speed: 90 mph (140 km/h, 78 kn)
- Stall speed: 40 mph (64 km/h, 35 kn)
- Service ceiling: 11,600 ft (3,500 m)
- Rate of climb: 350 ft/min (1.8 m/s)
- Time to altitude: 3,500 ft (1,100 m) in 10 minutes (fully loaded)
- Wing loading: 8.23 lb/sq ft (40.2 kg/m^{2})
- Power/mass: 22.3 lb/hp (13.6 kg/kW)

== See also ==
Aircraft of comparable role, configuration, and era

- Handley Page Type O
