= Bernard 60 =

1920s French transport aircraft

Bernard 60 T
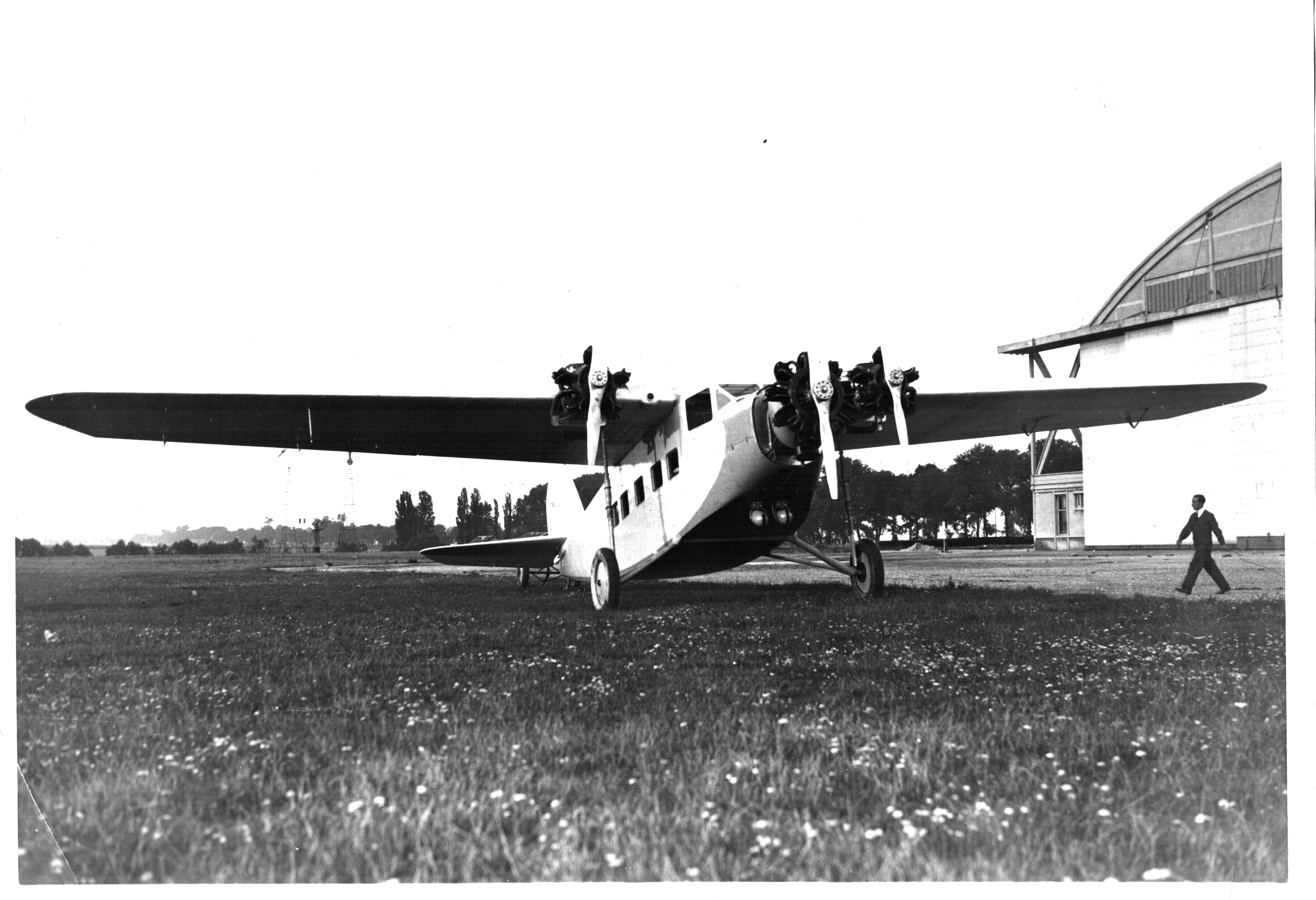

General information
- Type: Fourteen seat passenger aircraft
- National origin: France
- Manufacturer: Société des Avions Bernard (S.A.B)
- Designer: Jean Gaultier
- Number built: 1

History
- First flight: August 1929

The Bernard 60 T and 61 T were closely similar, three engine, twelve seat passenger transports designed in France between 1929 and 1933. They were not a success and only one of each was built.

== Design and development ==
The 60 T (T for transport) was the result of a decision made in May 1929 to turn a current military transport project into a civil, passenger carrying aircraft. The resulting design also owed much to the earlier, single engine Bernard 190 civil transport, though the 60 T had three engines and a greater span. Even though it retained only the wing from the military design, construction began on 11 June and was completed on 20 August.

The Bernard 60 was an all wood aircraft. Like the Barnard 190, it was a high wing cantilever monoplane. In plan the thick wing was straight tapered with rounded tips. The fuselage was flat sided with a curved underside. The crew's enclosed cabin was just ahead of the wing leading edge and the 3.80 m (12 ft 6 in) long passenger compartment, with twelve seats in all and five windows on each side, was lower down beneath the wings. Despite the rapid build, the accommodation was heated, ventilated and sound-proofed; entry was via a port side door which included the rearmost window. The sound proofing was assisted by silencers on the engines.

The empennage of the Bernard 60 was conventional with a rounded fin and rudder and a tailplane with a swept leading edge mounted on top of the fuselage. It had a split axle undercarriage with single mainwheels mounted on V-form struts from the lower fuselage longerons and landing loads taken by vertical struts to the wing just inboard of the engines, combined with a tailskid. The trimotor Bernard 60 was unusual in having different engines in the nose and on the wings. The central engine was a nine-cylinder, 313 kW (420 hp) Gnome-Rhône 9Ady Jupiter, with five cylinder, 180 kW (240 hp) Gnome-Rhône 5Bc Titan engines on the wings. The designers would have preferred about 225 kW (300 hp) from each of three identical engines but early in 1929 there were no available homologated types of this power.

== Flight history ==
The Bernard 60 flew for the first time at the end of August 1929, piloted by Antoine Paillard. Tests revealed a serious problem due to the mixture of engine powers: the Bernard 60 could fly satisfactorily with one wing motor shut down but could not reach the altitude of 1,000 metres (3,281 feet) required for certification on the power of the two wing motors alone, so in October 1930 Bernard proposed to install three seven-cylinder, 224 kW (300 hp) Gnome-Rhône 7Kdrs Titan-Major engines. It first flew in this form in July 1931 but was seriously damaged in a night landing on 22 December 1931 and did not fly again, being scrapped in 1934.

It was succeeded by the Bernard 61 T, similar but with a metal fuselage. The wing was unchanged, weights up by about 100 kg (220 lb) and maximum speed and ceiling increased by 27 km/h (17 mph) and 2,500 m (8,202 ft) respectively. It was powered by three Gnome-Rhône 7Kb Titan-Major engines with the same output as those used on the 60. The 61 T flew for the first time on 28 March 1933, piloted by Jean-Charles Bernache-Assollant.

== Operational history ==
The 60 T never received certification but the 61 T was approved after tests by the STAé in July 1933. It was registered as F-AKBY; the 60 T had flown with the same letters. In May 1934 Georges Barbot tested the performance of the 61 T, now technically dated and always with poor handling characteristics and not of interest to the recently formed Air France. It was modified again in September 1934 and delivered to the Centre d'Essais de Matériels Aériens (CEMA; Aerial Equipment Test Center) at Villacoublay airfield in October 1934, making its last flight the following February.

== Variants ==
=== 60 T ===
- All wood, originally powered by 2×Titans and 1×Jupiter, replaced by 3×Titan-Majors.

=== 61 T ===
- Metal fuselage, 3×Titan-Majors

== Specifications (61 T) ==
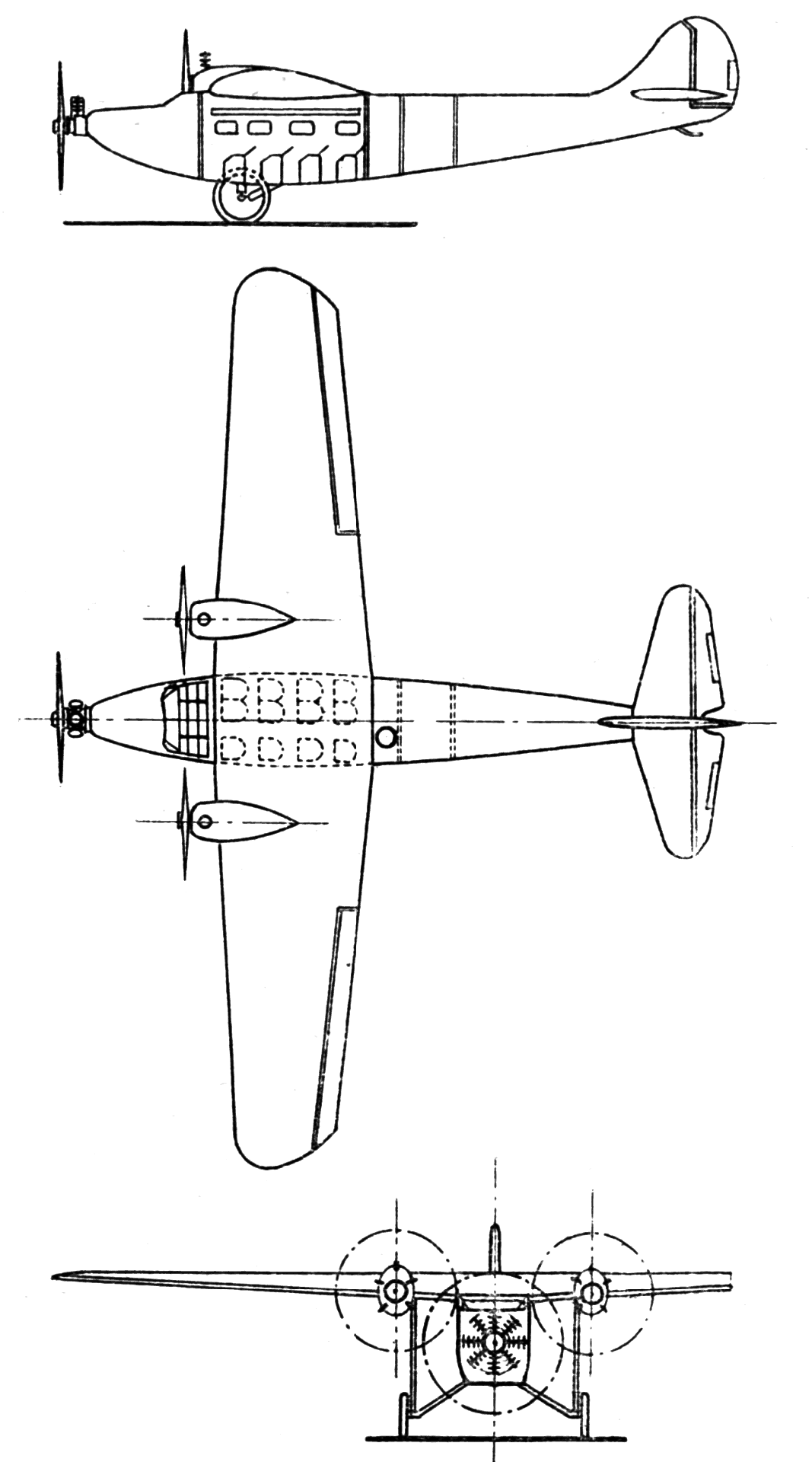
Bernard 60 T 3-view drawing from L'Aérophile September,1929

Data from Liron

General characteristics

- Crew: 2
- Capacity: 12 passengers
- Length: 15.57 m (51 ft 1 in)
- Wingspan: 21.50 m (70 ft 6 in)
- Height: 4.05 m (13 ft 3 in)
- Wing area: 66.0 m^{2} (710 sq ft)
- Empty weight: 3,500 kg (7,716 lb)
- Gross weight: 5,405 kg (11,916 lb)
- Powerplant: 3 × Gnome-Rhône 7Kb Titan-Major 7-cylinder radial, 220 kW (300 hp) each
- Propellers: 2-bladed

Performance

- Maximum speed: 245 km/h (152 mph, 132 kn)
- Range: 800 km (500 mi, 430 nmi)
- Service ceiling: 6,500 m (21,300 ft)

== Bibliography ==
- Liron, Jean (1990). Les avions Bernard. Collection Docavia. Vol. 31. Paris: Éditions Larivière. ISBN 2-84890-065-2.
