= Bergamaschi C-1 =

Bergamaschi C-1 and C-2
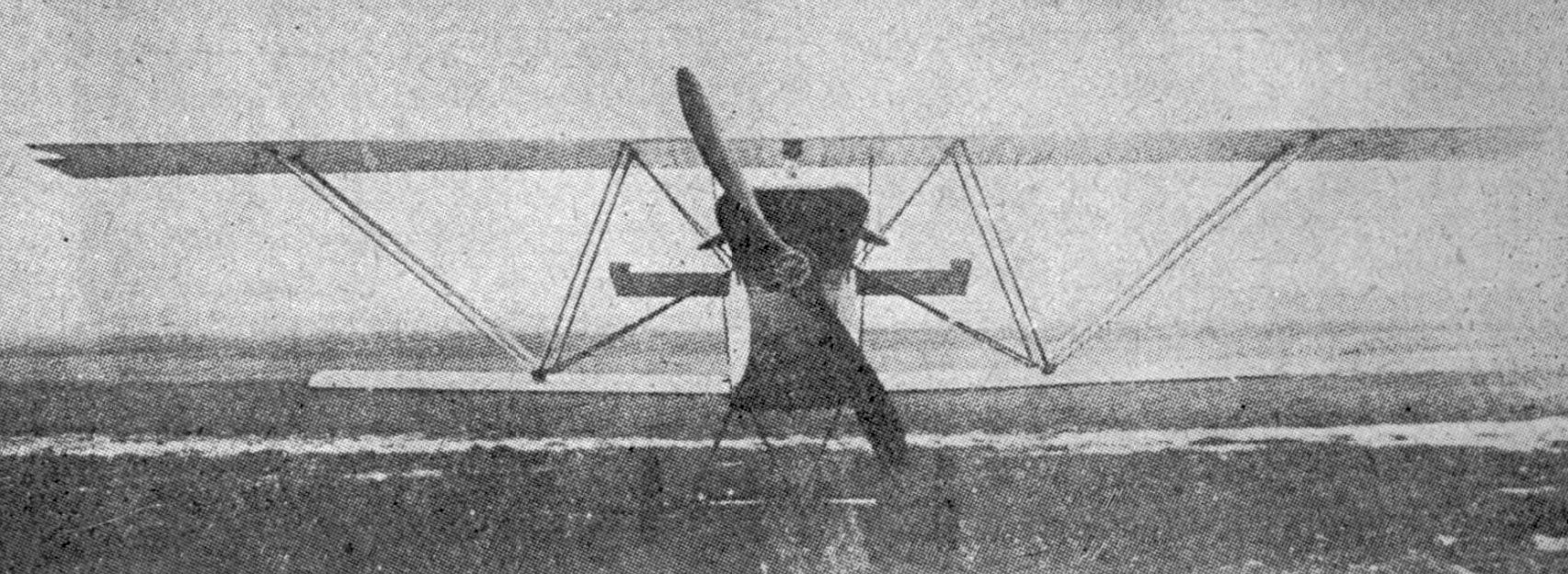
- CAB C-1

General information
- Type: Light trainer
- Manufacturer: Cantieri Aeronautic Bergamaschi

History
- First flight: 1920s

The Bergamaschi C-1 and C-2 were Italian single-engined light trainers built by Cantieri Aeronautici Bergamaschi for the Bergamo flying school.

== Design and development ==
During the 1920s the flying school at Bergamo developed a light training aircraft. Original for use in its own flying school it was also for sale to other flying schools and private individuals. A new company Cantieri Aeronautici Bergamaschi was established to build the aircraft.

== Variants ==
C-1
was an unequal-span biplane of conventional wood and fabric construction. The fuselage structure included an open cockpit for the pilot just aft of the upper wing trailing edge. It had a fixed tailskid type landing gear. Powered by a Hispano-Suiza inline engine.
C-2
was generally similar differing only in having two seats.

== Specifications (C-2) ==
Data from Jane's all the World's Aircraft 1928

General characteristics

- Crew: 2 (C-1 1 seat)
- Length: 6.92 m (22 ft 8 in)
- Wingspan: 9.6 m (31 ft 6 in)
- Height: 2.78 m (9 ft 1 in)
- Empty weight: 727 kg (1,603 lb)
- Gross weight: 947 kg (2,088 lb)
- Powerplant: 1 × Hispano-Suiza 6Pa 6-cylinder water-cooled in-line piston engine, 110 kW (150 hp)
- Propellers: 2-bladed fixed pitch propeller

Performance

- Maximum speed: 188 km/h (117 mph, 102 kn)

C-1 192 km/h (119 mph; 104 kn)

- Stall speed: 85 km/h (53 mph, 46 kn)
- Endurance: 1 hour 30 minutes
- Time to altitude: 3,000 m (9,800 ft) in 40 minutes

C-1 1,000 m (3,300 ft) in 3 minutes 50 seconds; 2,000 m (6,600 ft) in 9 minutes; 3,000 m (9,800 ft) in 17 minutes; 4,000 m (13,000 ft) in 32 minutes; 4,750 m (15,580 ft) in 49 minutes

- Wing loading: 44.7 kg/m^{2} (9.2 lb/sq ft)
- Power/mass: 1.095 kW/kg (0.666 hp/lb)
