= Béchereau SRAP T.7 =

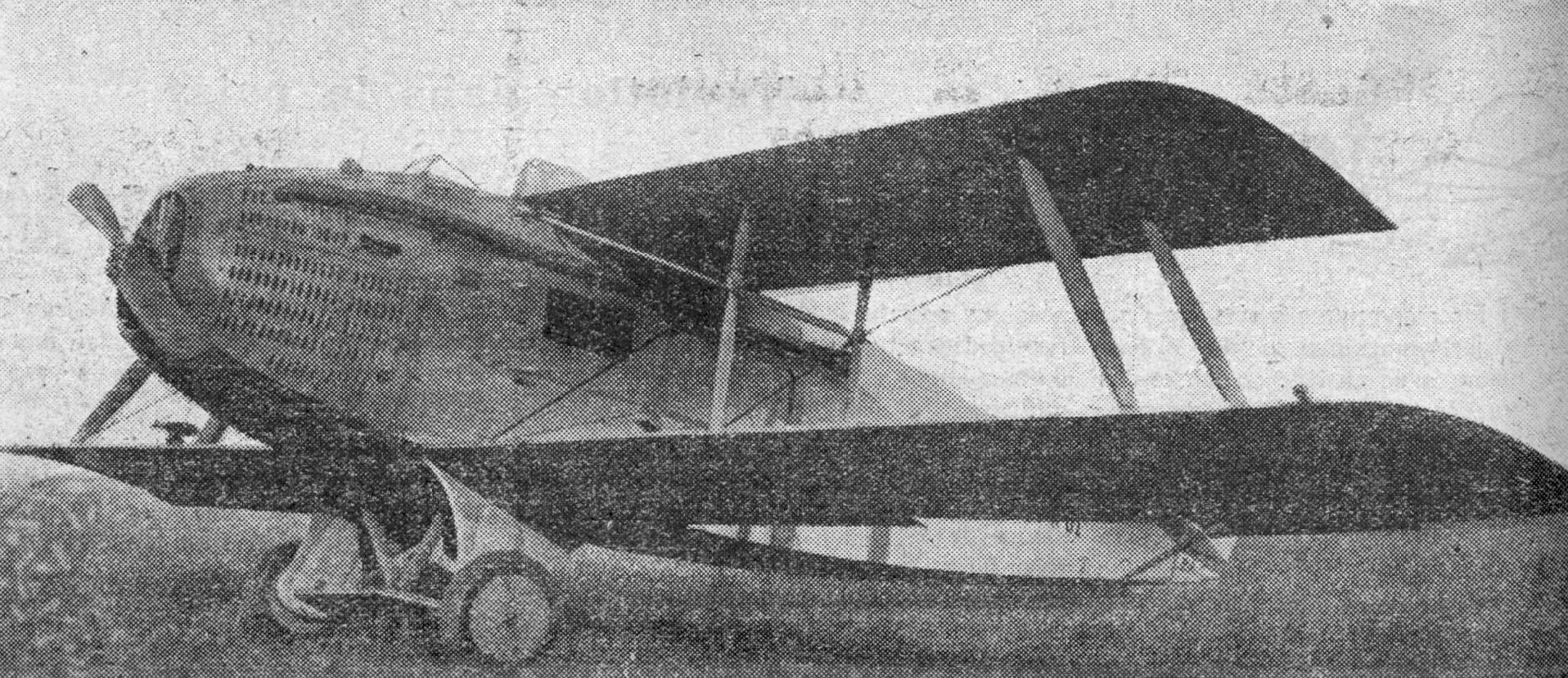

General information
- Type: Sesquiplane airliner
- National origin: France
- Manufacturer: Société pour la Réalisation d'Appareils
- Designer: Louis Béchereau
- Number built: 1

History
- First flight: 1926

The Béchereau SRAP T.7 was a French single-engined seven-passenger sesquiplane airliner designed by Louis Béchereau who had designed biplane fighters for SPAD including the SPAD S.VII. The aircraft was built by the Société pour la Réalisation d'Appareils.

== Design and development ==
The T.7 was an inverted Sesquiplane, the lower wing had a longer span than the upper. Forward of the upper wing was an open cockpit for the pilot and mechanic, between the wings was an enclosed cabin for seven passengers. It was powered by a 520 hp (388 kW) Salmson 18Cmb inline radial piston engine. The aircraft failed to find any buyers and did not enter production.

== Specifications ==
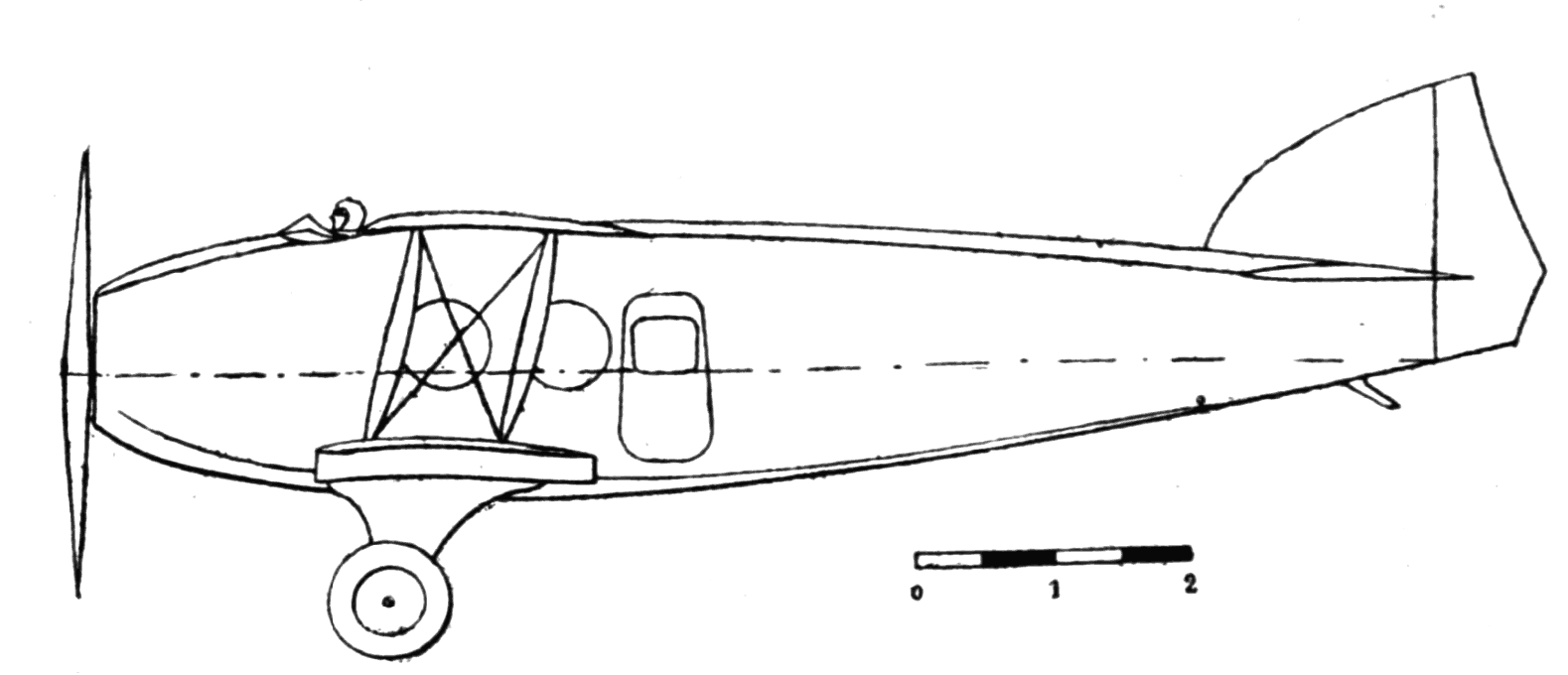
Béchereau SRAP T.7 profile drawing L'Aéronautique December,1926

Data from The Illustrated Encyclopedia of Aircraft

General characteristics

- Crew: 2 (pilot, mechanic)
- Capacity: 7 passengers
- Length: 10.70 m (35 ft 1.25 in)
- Wingspan: 16.90 m (55 ft 5.25 in)
- Height: 3.25 m (10 ft 8 in)
- Wing area: 60.0 m^{2} (645.86 sq ft)
- Empty weight: 2,370 kg (5,225 lb)
- Gross weight: 4,050 kg (8,928 lb)
- Powerplant: 1 × Salmson 18Cmb 18 cylinder water-cooled in-line radial piston engine , 388 kW (520 hp)

Performance

- Maximum speed: 200 km/h (124 mph, 108 kn)
