= Bakeng Deuce =

American homebuilt aircraft

Deuce
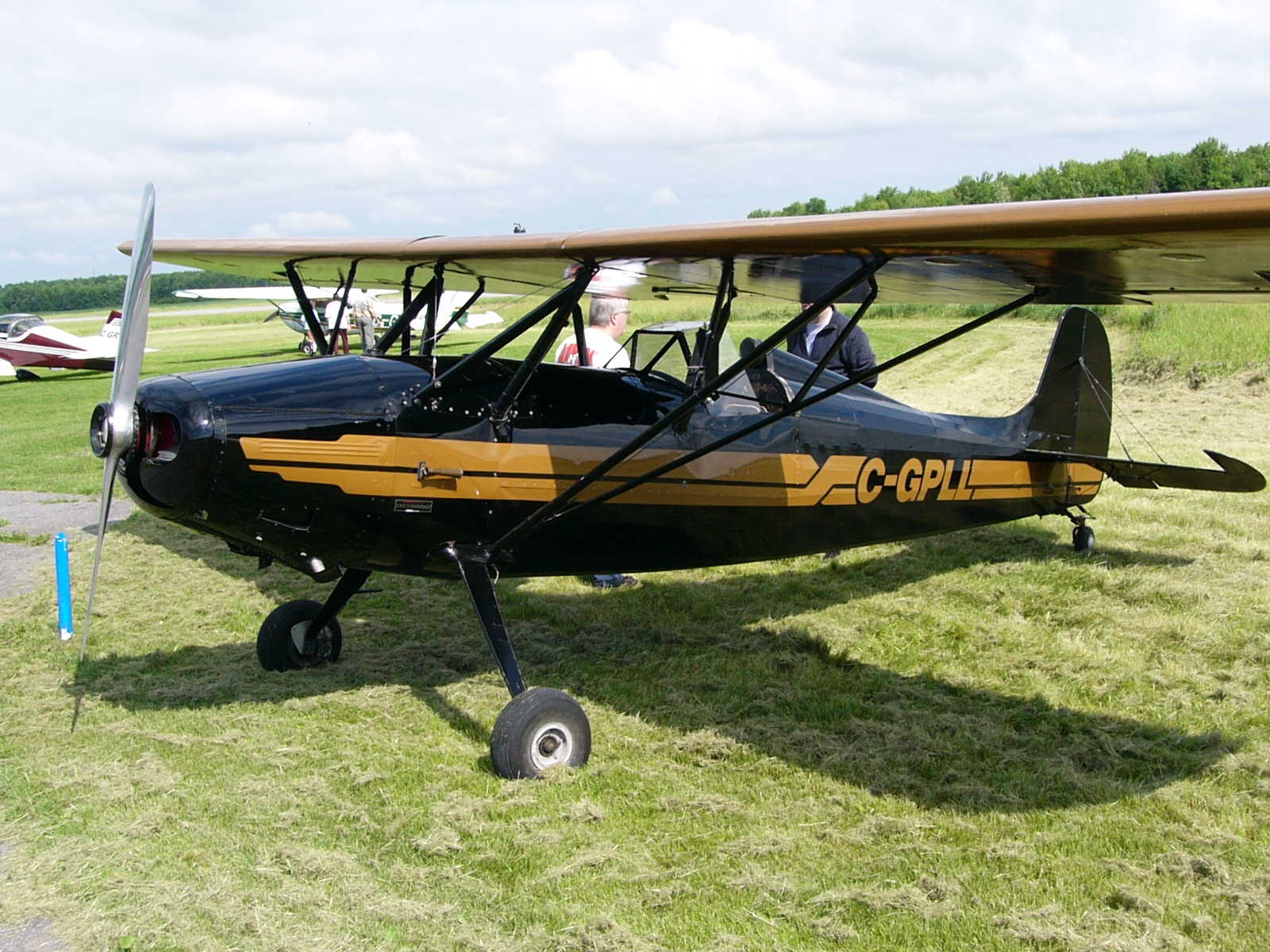

General information
- Type: Homebuilt aircraft
- Manufacturer: Bakeng Deuce Airplane Factory
- Designer: Jerry Bakeng
- Status: In production (2011)
- Number built: 112 (2011)

History
- First flight: 2 April 1970

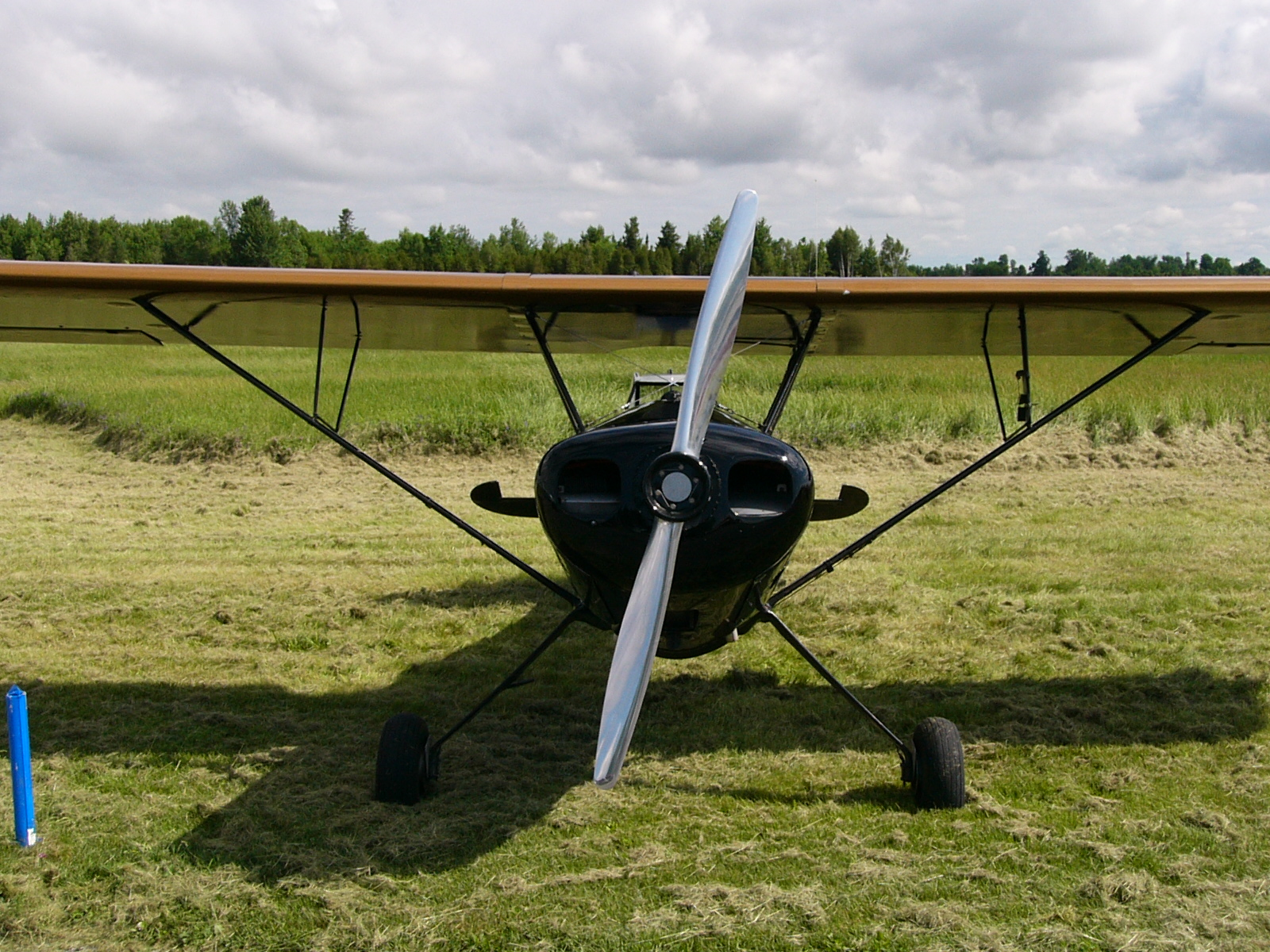
Bakeng Duce front view

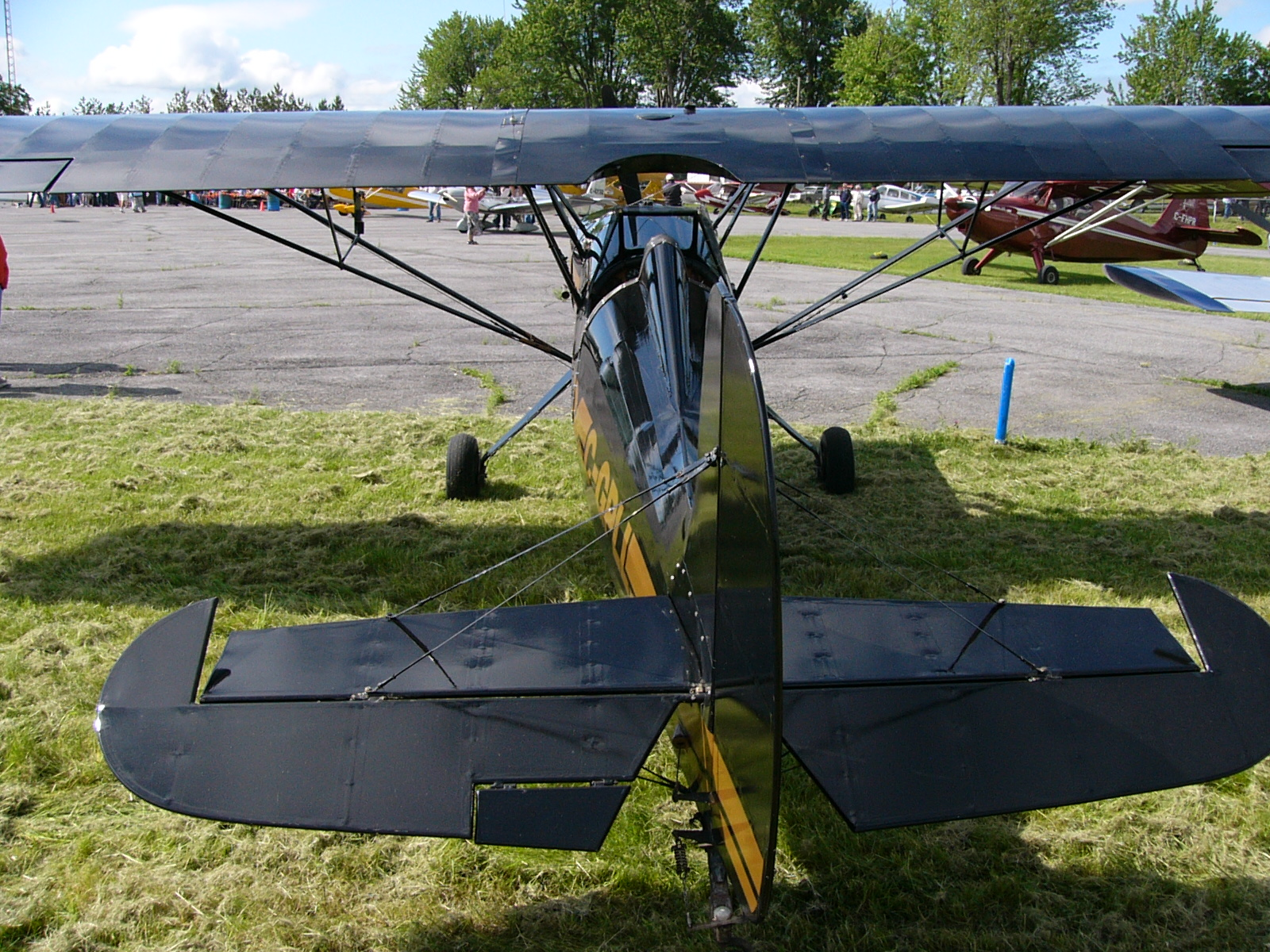
Bakeng Duce rear view

The Bakeng Deuce (formerly the Duce) is a parasol-wing monoplane designed in the United States in the early 1970s and marketed for homebuilding. Plans and parts were still available in 2007, although the rights have changed hands in the intervening years.

A biplane derivative, the Double Duce was also available at one time.

== Design and development ==
The aircraft's configuration as a two-seat open cockpit, parasol wing monoplane, with fixed tailwheel undercarriage evokes 1930s designs, however, it was a new design by former Boeing engineer Jerry Bakeng, which won the Outstanding New Design Trophy at the 1971 EAA fly-in at Oshkosh, Wisconsin. Two hundred sets of plans had been sold by 1979. The fuselage construction is of welded steel tube with the forward part skinned in metal and the rear in fabric. The wings are constructed of wooden ribs and spars with fabric covering and are removable for transport or storage.

Rights to the Deuce were purchased by the Bakeng Deuce Airplane Factory in March 1999 and the spelling of the aircraft's name was changed at this point.

== Specifications (Deuce) ==
General characteristics

- Crew: one pilot
- Capacity: one passenger
- Length: 20 ft 9 in (6.33 m)
- Wingspan: 30 ft 4 in (9.25 m)
- Height: 7 ft 0 in (2.13 m)
- Empty weight: 1,050 lb (476 kg)
- Gross weight: 1,650 lb (748 kg)
- Powerplant: 1 × Lycoming O-290 , 150 hp (112 kW)

Performance

- Maximum speed: 140 mph (225 km/h, 120 kn)
- Service ceiling: 12,000 ft (3,660 m)
- Rate of climb: 1,000 ft/min (5.1 m/s)
