= Belyayev EOI =

EOI

General information
- Type: Fighter
- National origin: USSR
- Manufacturer: Belyayev
- Designer: Viktor Belyaev

The EOI (experimental single-seat fighter) was a fighter aircraft designed and built in the USSR from August 1939.

== Development ==
Viktor Nikolayevich Belyayev had an illustrious early career with TsAGI, AVIAVnito, Aeroflot, OMOS, AGOS, KOSOS and the Tupolev OKB. He also designed and built several gliders from 1920, including flying wing designs.

Belyayev was authorised to design and build this twin-boom experimental pusher-engined fighter in August 1939. The prototype aircraft and the vast majority of drawings, paperwork and photographs were destroyed in October 1941 during the German invasion. A fighter-dive bomber version of the EOI, called PBI (dive bomber fighter), was in the planning stages.

== Specifications (EOI) ==
Data from Gunston, Bill. "Encyclopaedia of Russian Aircraft 1875–1995". London:Osprey. 1995. ISBN 1-85532-405-9

General characteristics

- Crew: 1
- Wingspan: 11.4 m (37 ft 5 in)
- Wing area: 19 m^{2} (205 sq ft)
- Airfoil: max speed
- Powerplant: × Klimov M-105 (VK-105) , 783 kW (1,050 hp)

Performance

== See also ==
- Twin-boom aircraft

Aircraft of comparable role, configuration, and era

- SAAB J21
- Vultee XP-54

Related lists

- List of aircraft
