= Bellanca 31-40 =

1935 American utility aircraft family

31-40 Senior Pacemaker
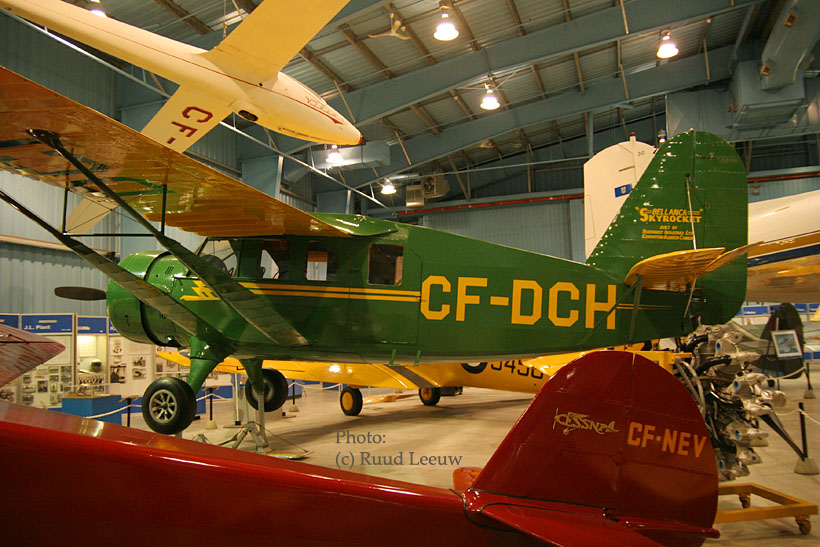
- CF-DCH Reynolds-Alberta Museum c. 2006, photo by Ruud Leeuw

General information
- Type: Civil utility aircraft
- Manufacturer: Bellanca, Northwest Industries (under licence)
- Number built: ca. 20 + 13 under licence

History
- First flight: 1935

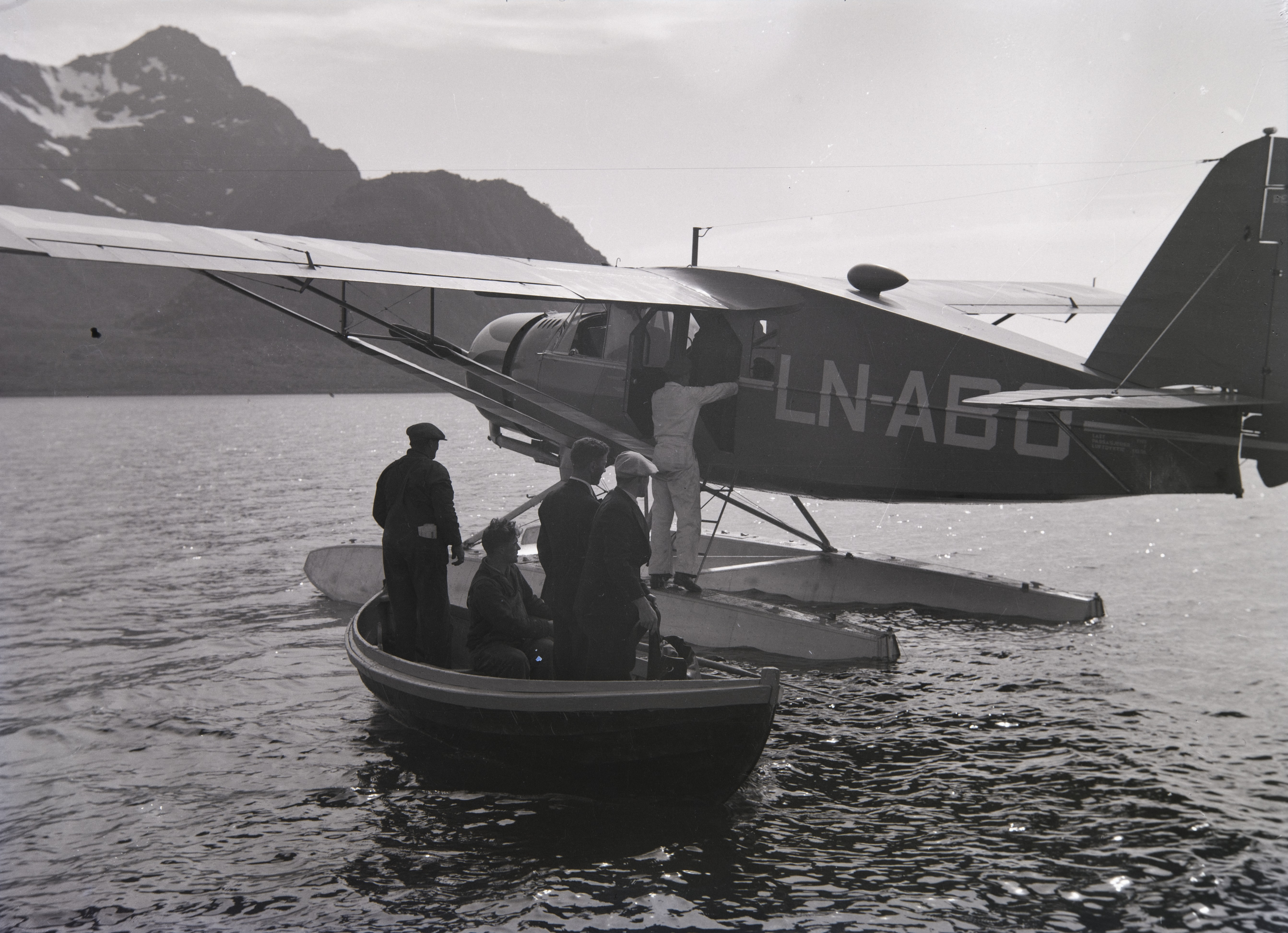
A Bellanca Senior Pacemaker "LN-ABO" pictured in Northern Norway late 1930s

The Bellanca 31-40 Senior Pacemaker and its derivatives were a family of a six- and eight-seat utility aircraft built in the United States in the late 1930s. They were the final revision of the original late 1920s Wright-Bellanca WB-2 design. The model numbers used by Bellanca in this period reflected the wing area (in this case, 310 square feet) and engine horsepower (400 and up in this series), each divided by ten. Like their predecessors, these were high-wing braced monoplanes with conventional tailwheel undercarriage.

A single Senior Skyrocket was bought by the United States Navy in 1938 for use as a utility transport, designated JE-1. Senior Skyrockets were also built under licence by Northwest Industries in Canada following World War II.

In 2007, two examples remains extant – the first Canadian-built aircraft (registration CF-DCH), preserved at the Reynolds-Alberta Museum, and one in storage at the Alaska Aviation Museum.

== Variants ==
- 31-40 Senior Pacemaker - Wright Cyclone engine, 400 hp (298 kW).
- 31-42 Senior Pacemaker - Fitted with a redesigned tail surface, accommodation for one pilot and five passengers, powered by a 550-hp (410-kW) Pratt & Whitney Wasp S3H1 radial piston engine.
- 31-50 Senior Skyrocket - Pratt & Whitney Hornet engine, 550 hp (410 kW).
  - L-11 - One 31-50 impressed into service by the United States Army Air Forces in Alaska in 1942.
- 31-55 Senior Skyrocket
  - JE-1 - Senior Skyrocket version for US Navy with 570 hp (425 kW) engine.
  - de Luxe Senior Skyrocket - 31-55 with improved instrumentation and superior interior and exterior finishes, powered by a 525-hp (391-kW) Pratt & Whitney Wasp radial piston engine.
  - Model 31-55A - Built under licence in Canada by Northwest Industries.

== Operators ==
United States

- United States Army Air Forces
- United States Navy

Norway

- Widerøes Flyveselskap

== Specifications (31-55 Senior Skyrocket) ==
Data from American Planes and Engines for 1939

General characteristics

- Crew: 1
- Capacity: 5 passengers
- Length: 27 ft 11 in (8.51 m)
- Wingspan: 50 ft 6 in (15.39 m)
- Height: 8 ft 6 in (2.59 m)
- Wing area: 359.0 sq ft (33.35 m^{2})
- Empty weight: 3,440 lb (1,560 kg)
- Gross weight: 5,600 lb (2,540 kg)
- Fuel capacity: 200 US gal (170 imp gal; 760 L)
- Powerplant: 1 × Pratt & Whitney Wasp air-cooled 9-cylinder radial engine, 550 hp (410 kW)

Performance

- Maximum speed: 190 mph (310 km/h, 170 kn) at 5,000 ft (1,500 m)
- Cruise speed: 180 mph (290 km/h, 160 kn) at 12,000 ft (3,700 m)
- Stall speed: 64 mph (103 km/h, 56 kn)
- Range: 600 mi (970 km, 520 nmi)
- Service ceiling: 25,000 ft (7,600 m)
- Rate of climb: 1,240 ft/min (6.3 m/s)
