= Mráz Bonzo =

M-3 Bonzo
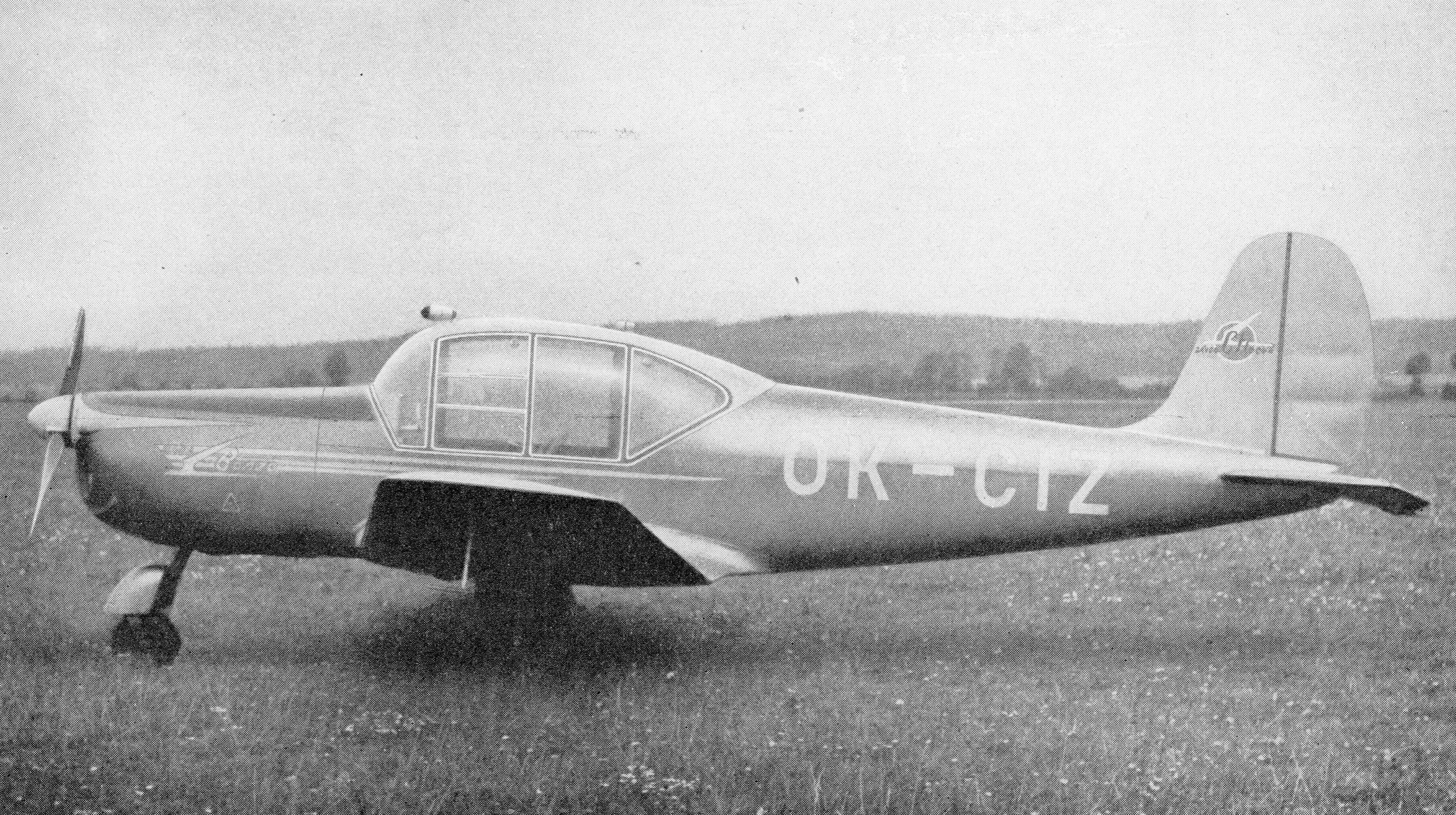

General information
- Type: Utility aircraft
- National origin: Czechoslovakia
- Manufacturer: Mráz
- Designer: Zdeněk Rublič
- Number built: 1

History
- First flight: April 1948

The Mráz M-3 Bonzo was a light aircraft built in Czechoslovakia in 1948 as a further development in the family of light aircraft that had commenced with the M-1 Sokol.

== Design and development ==
After the end of the Second World War, the Czechoslovak company Beneš-Mráz, which had been a successful producer of light aircraft prior to the war, came under the control of Automobilov Zavody, with Beneš-Mráz's Choceň factory being renamed Orlican Narodny Podnik in 1946. Mráz's designer Zdeněk Rublič, who had secretly designed the Mráz Sokol, which first flew in 1946, during the war, envisioned a series of related light aircraft, including a two-seat trainer, which became the M-2 Skaut, and a four-seater, the M-3 Bonzo.

The Bonzo was based on the Sokol airframe, but with a redesigned wing and substantial changes to the fuselage. These included lengthening it to allow for the addition of a fourth seat, reducing the height of the rear fuselage to allow for a new cabin with all-around visibility, and the addition of a semi-retractable nosewheel in place of a tailwheel. Like the Sokol, the Bonzo (which was named after Rublič's dog) was a low-wing monoplane of all-wood construction. Two rows of two seats were accommodated in a spacious and extensively glazed cabin, while dual controls were fitted, with a luggage compartment fitted behind the rear seats. The mainwheels of the tricycle landing gear retracted completely into the wing, while the nosewheel partly protruded when retracted. The prototype was powered by a single inverted Walter Minor 6-III six-cylinder air-cooled inline engine, rated at 118 kW (158 hp), driving a fixed two-bladed wooden propeller (which was later replaced by an electrically operated variable-pitch propeller).

While an initial proposal to the Czechoslovak Ministry of Transport asked for funds to build two flying prototypes and a third airframe for static testing, the proposal was rejected and only a single prototype was built. This flew for the first time in April 1948. Testing was generally successful, although the prototype was overweight, and it was planned to introduce a turbocharged version of the Walter Minor engine rated at 136 kW (182 hp) for short periods to improve performance. It was planned that production could begin in 1950, and the Bonzo was exhibited at the 1949 Paris Air Show, where it attracted favourable attention. This interest did not turn into sales, however, as the 1948 Czechoslovak coup d'état stopped sales to the west, and the twin-engined Aero 45 was preferred for domestic air-taxi duties, with production plans being stopped and testing suspended.

The Bonzo was used as a runabout at the Choceň factory until the end of 1949, and was then passed to the Slovak Institute of Cartography in Bratislava where it served until 1952. It was then transferred to the Czechoslovak paramilitary youth training organisation Svazarm. In October–November 1961, the Bonzo was used to set a number of national and international speed records, but was withdrawn from use soon afterwards and was not preserved.

== Specifications ==
Data from Jane's All The World's Aircraft 1951–52

General characteristics

- Crew: 1
- Capacity: 3 passengers
- Length: 7.72 m (25 ft 4 in)
- Wingspan: 10.60 m (34 ft 9 in)
- Height: 2.25 m (7 ft 5 in)
- Wing area: 15.9 m^{2} (171 sq ft)
- Empty weight: 580 kg (1,279 lb)
- Gross weight: 1,100 kg (2,425 lb)
- Fuel capacity: 165 L (36 imp gal; 44 US gal)
- Powerplant: 1 × Walter Minor 6-III air-cooled six-cylinder inverted inline engine, 120 kW (160 hp)

Performance

- Maximum speed: 266 km/h (165 mph, 144 kn)
- Cruise speed: 240 km/h (150 mph, 130 kn)
- Range: 1,000 km (620 mi, 540 nmi)
- Service ceiling: 5,000 m (16,000 ft)
- Rate of climb: 3.0 m/s (590 ft/min)

== See also ==
Related development

- Mráz Sokol
