= Beneš-Mráz Beta-Scolar =

1930s Czechoslovak light aircraft

Be.252 Beta-Scolar
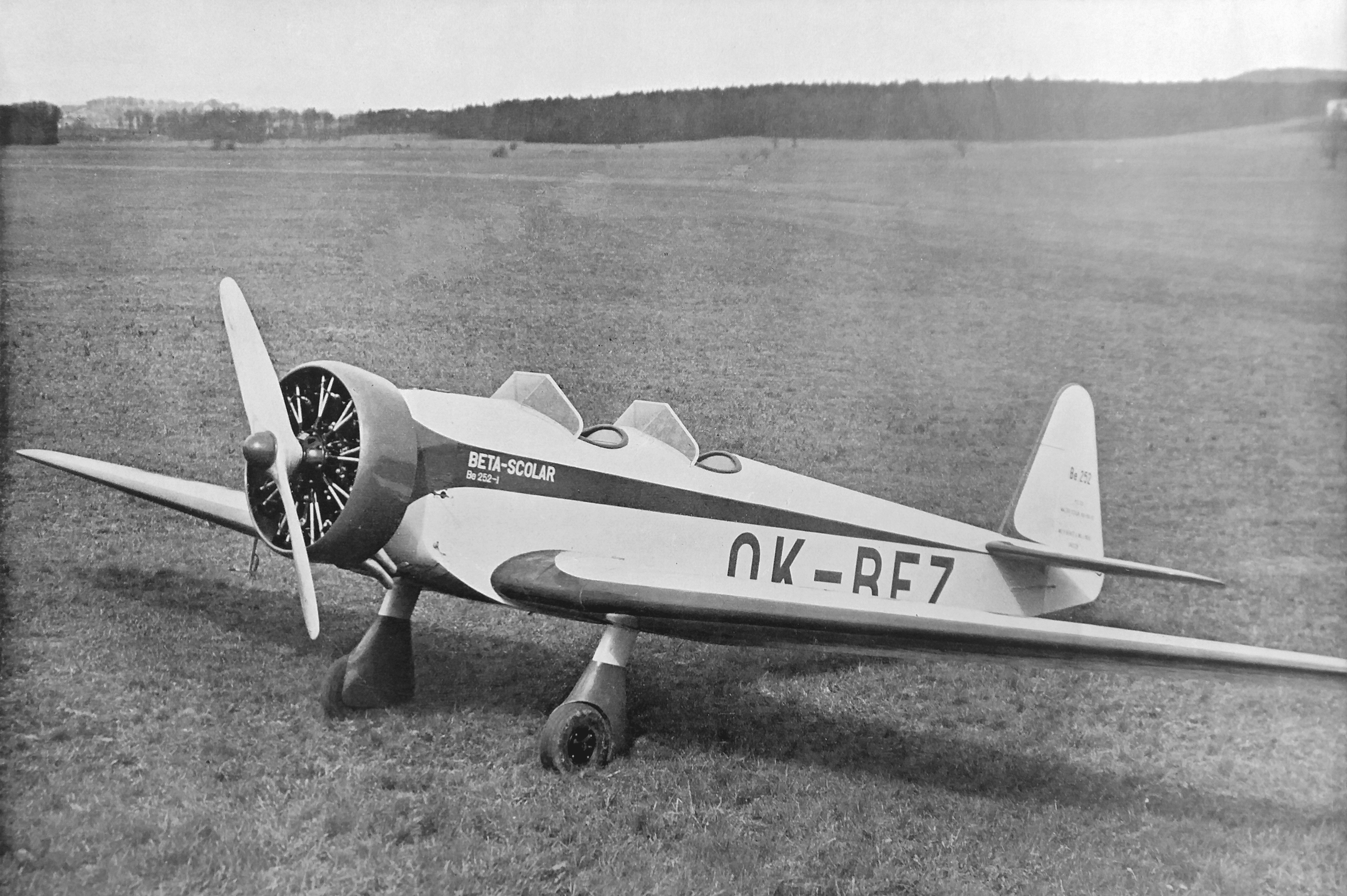

General information
- Type: Aerobatic sports plane
- Manufacturer: Beneš-Mráz
- Designer: Pavel Beneš and Jaroslav Mráz

History
- First flight: 1937

The Beneš-Mráz Be.252 Beta-Scolar was an aerobatic aircraft manufactured in Czechoslovakia shortly before World War II. Based on the Beneš-Mráz Beta-Minor, it had a structure considerably strengthened for aerobatics and a more powerful radial engine in place of the Beta-Minor's inline engine.

== Variants ==
- Be.252C Beta-Scolar

== Specifications ==
Data from

General characteristics

- Crew: 2
- Length: 7.45 m (24 ft 5 in)
- Wingspan: 10.966 m (36 ft 0 in)
- Height: 2.02 m (6 ft 8 in)
- Wing area: 14 m^{2} (150 sq ft)
- Empty weight: 610 kg (1,345 lb)
- Max takeoff weight: 890 kg (1,962 lb)
- Powerplant: 1 × Walter Scolar 7-cyl. air-cooled radial piston engine, 134 kW (180 hp)
- Propellers: 2-bladed fixed pitch wooden propeller

Performance

- Maximum speed: 250 km/h (160 mph, 130 kn) at sea level
- Cruise speed: 215 km/h (134 mph, 116 kn)
- Range: 500 km (310 mi, 270 nmi)
- Service ceiling: 7,000 m (23,000 ft)
- Rate of climb: 4.2 m/s (830 ft/min)

== See also ==
Related development

- Beneš-Mráz Be-50 Beta-Minor
