= Kubicek Balloons =

Manufacturing company

Coordinates: 49°12′52.88″N 16°39′32.86″E

Kubíček Factory s.r.o.
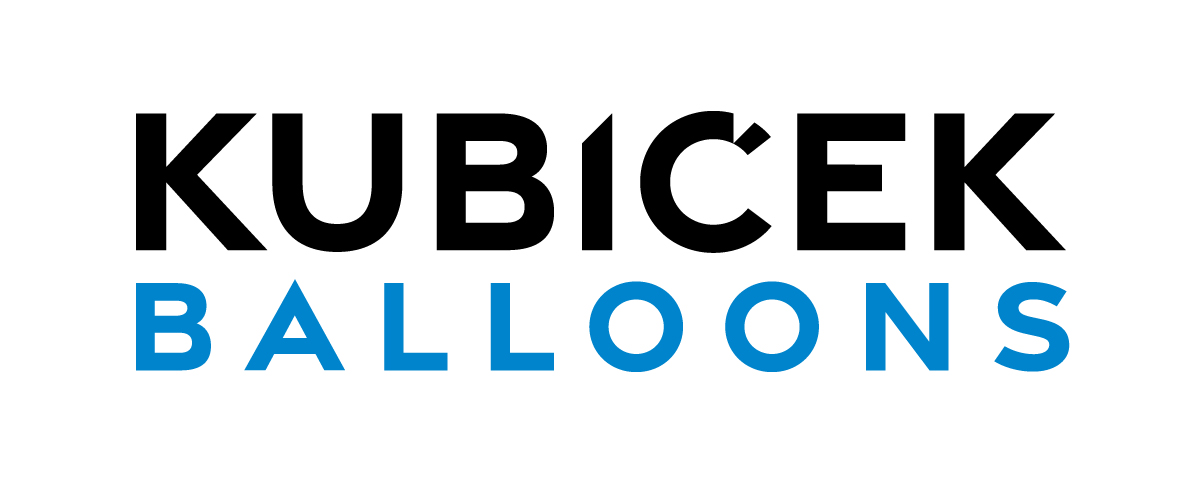

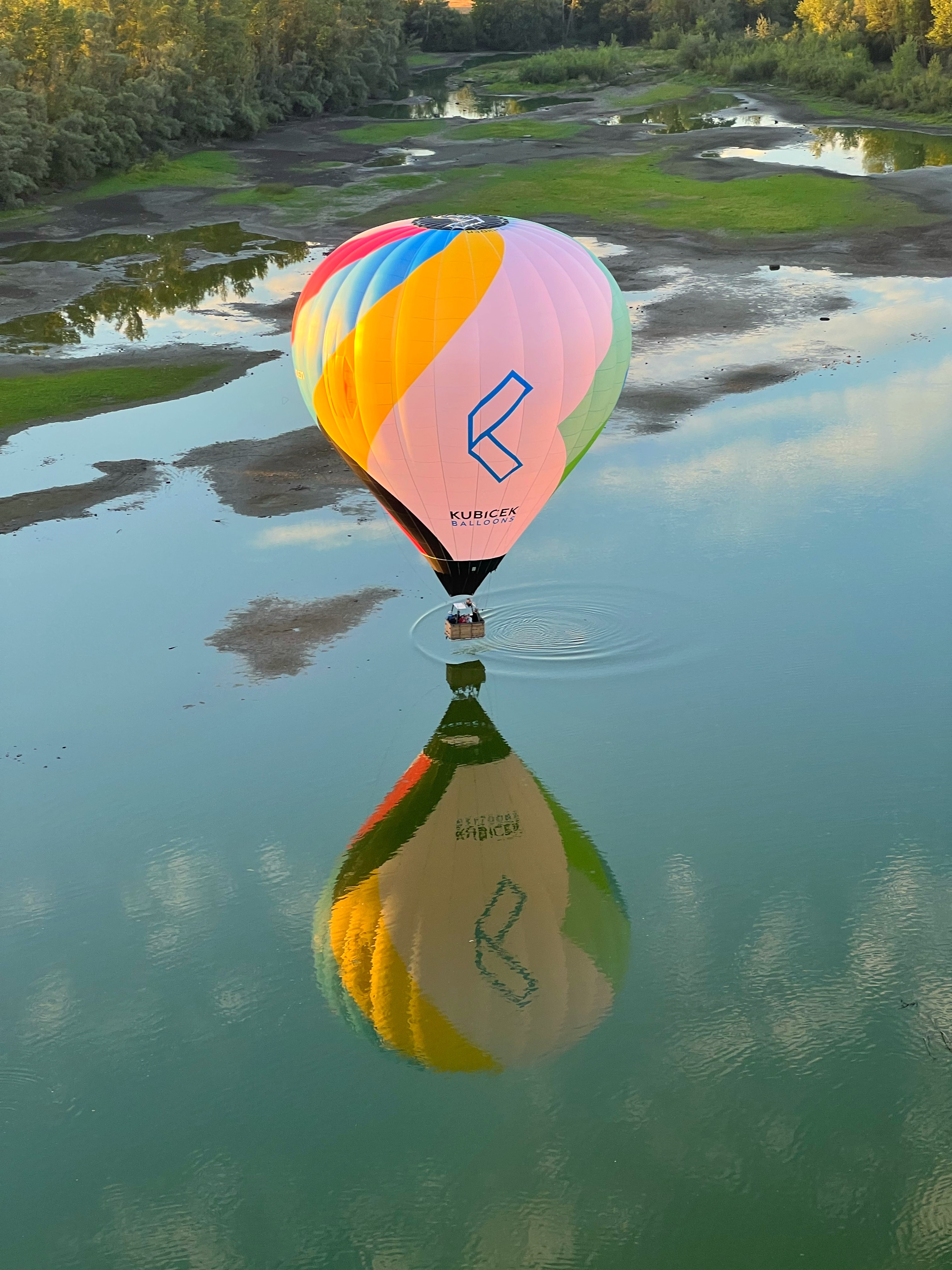
- Type: Limited
- Industry: Aircraft industry
- Founded: 1991
- Founder: Aleš Kubíček
- Headquarters: Brno, Czech Republic
- Area served: Global
- Products: Hot-air balloons
- Owner: Aleš Kubíček
- Number of employees: 139
- Website: kubicekballoons.com

Kubíček Balloons is a Czech manufacturer of hot-air balloons and airships based in Brno. It exports most of its production and is among the world’s largest balloon manufacturers. The company also makes exhibition structures and advertising inflatables under the Kubíček Visionair name.

Aleš Kubíček founded the company in 1991, following his work building balloons with Brno’s Aviatik club during the 1980s. In 2022, it adopted the name Kubíček Factory s.r.o., while continuing to sell balloons as Kubíček Balloons.

The related company Kubíček Aircraft has developed the M-2 Scout and M-4 Irbis light aircraft.

== History ==
Aleš Kubíček and other members of the Aviatik club in Brno began building a hot-air balloon in the early 1980s. Registered as OK-3010, it made its first public tethered ascent at Brno-Medlánky on 5 June 1983. Production continued in Brno under the aircraft manufacturer Aerotechnik.

After the Velvet Revolution, Kubíček started his own business in 1990. The following year, he established KUBÍČEK spol. s r.o., which made balloons in a building on Francouzská Street. Its early customers included buyers in Austria and Belgium. A Belgian distributor helped the company enter the Western European market.

The company began developing its own polyester balloon fabric during the 1990s and set up textile production in Černá Hora near Brno. To expand sales abroad, it recruited a former sales director of the British balloon manufacturer Thunder and Colt. It changed its name to BALÓNY KUBÍČEK spol. s r.o. in 2000.

The company moved balloon production to Brno-Maloměřice in 2005. Unlike the old premises, the new factory had room to inflate and test balloons on site. Expansion into the US followed, although obtaining certification took several years. In 2021, Kubíček was described as one of the world’s three largest hot-air balloon manufacturers.

The company changed its name to Kubíček Factory in 2022, while continuing to sell its balloons under the Kubíček Balloons name.

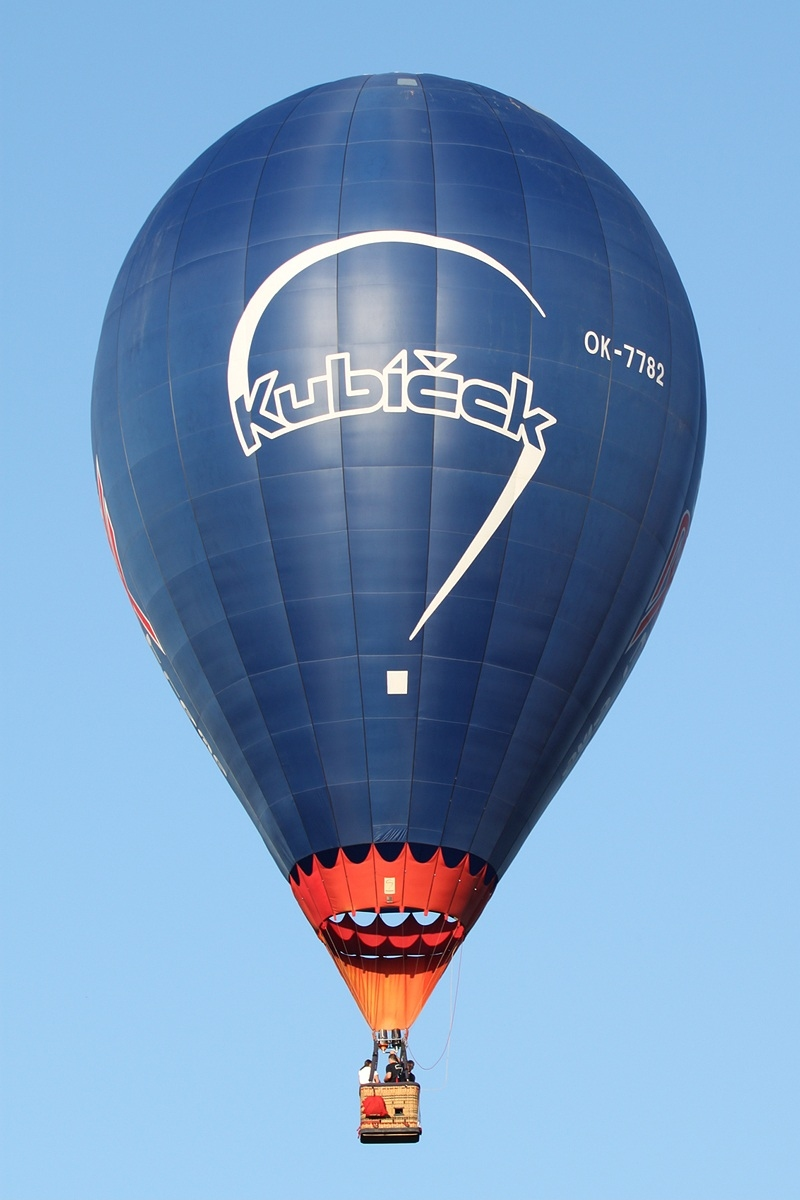
Kubicek balloon

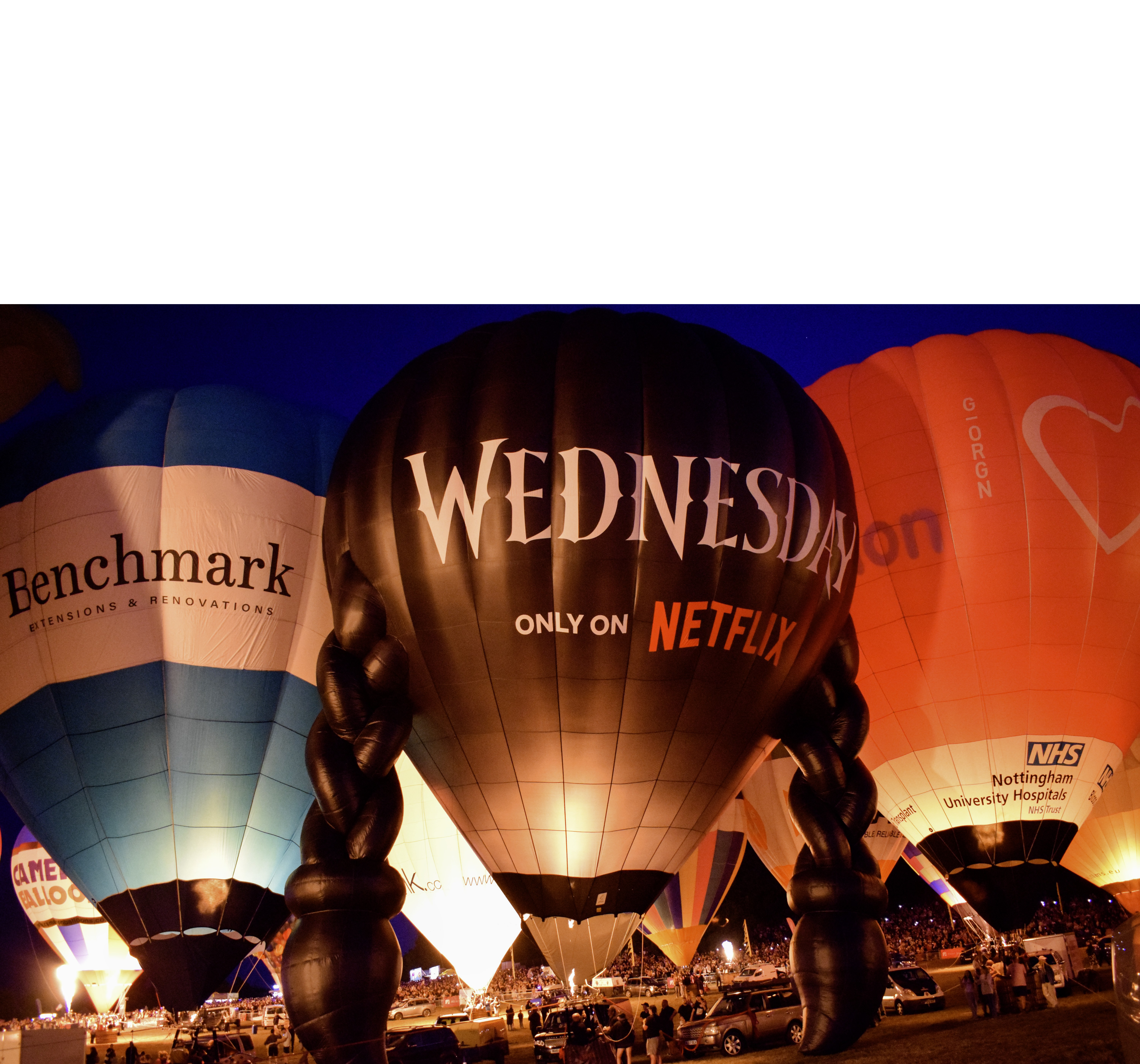
Branded hot air balloons built by Kubicek Balloons at the famous Bristol Balloon Fiesta Nightglow

== Operations and products ==
Kubíček manufactures hot-air balloons for recreational flying, competitions, commercial passenger flights and advertising. It makes balloon envelopes, baskets, burners and fuel cylinders, as well as specially shaped balloons built to customers’ designs. Its largest passenger balloons accommodate up to 32 passengers and a pilot.

At the Brno factory, fabric panels are cut and sewn into balloon envelopes, while baskets are woven by hand from rattan. Some baskets have doors to make boarding easier.

Kubíček makes up to 190 balloons a year, with roughly nine out of ten sold abroad. Germany and the United States are its main export markets.

The company produces its own polyester envelope fabric in Černá Hora near Brno, where it is woven, coloured and coated. The Fédération Aéronautique Internationale described Kubíček as the only balloon manufacturer to produce, coat and colour its own fabric.

Kubíček also supplies spare parts and provides factory servicing and maintenance training. Pilot training for its customers is offered through Balónový zámek at the château in Radešín.

== Inflatable structures ==
Kubíček Factory produces exhibition structures, theatrical scenery and art installations under the Kubíček Visionair name. It has worked with design studio Visualove and Brno Observatory and Planetarium on large inflatable astronomical models. Their collaboration began with a ten-metre model of the Moon, unveiled in 2019. Models of Earth, Mars and the Sun followed.

Visionair made the inflatable ring for Air Square, a portable pavilion designed by architecture studio KOGAA. The pavilion has been installed in cities including Berlin, Paris and Seattle. Its inflatable ring rests on a modular plywood frame, providing shade during the day and lighting at night.

Besides that, Kubíček Factory also develops inflatable military decoys with JISR Institute. The partners exhibited replicas of the Titus armoured vehicle and CV90 infantry fighting vehicle at IDET in Brno in 2025. These are designed to imitate both the appearance of real vehicles and their heat, radar and radio signatures.

== Fixed-wing aircraft ==
Kubíček Aircraft was founded in 2009 to develop and build light aircraft. Its first model, the two-seat M-2 Scout, began as a student project at Brno University of Technology, with support from the Kubíček business. The students based it on the Mráz M-2 Skaut of 1948, replacing the original wooden construction with metal. The Scout made its first flight on 7 May 2009.

The next model was the M-4 Irbis, a two-seat, all-metal aircraft with a high wing and landing gear suited to unpaved airstrips. It was designed for recreational flying and pilot training. The first prototype flew in September 2015, but the aircraft was then redesigned by a new team. The revised plane first flew on 25 September 2023.
