= List of aircraft of the Egyptian Air Force =

Roundel of the Egyptian Air Force

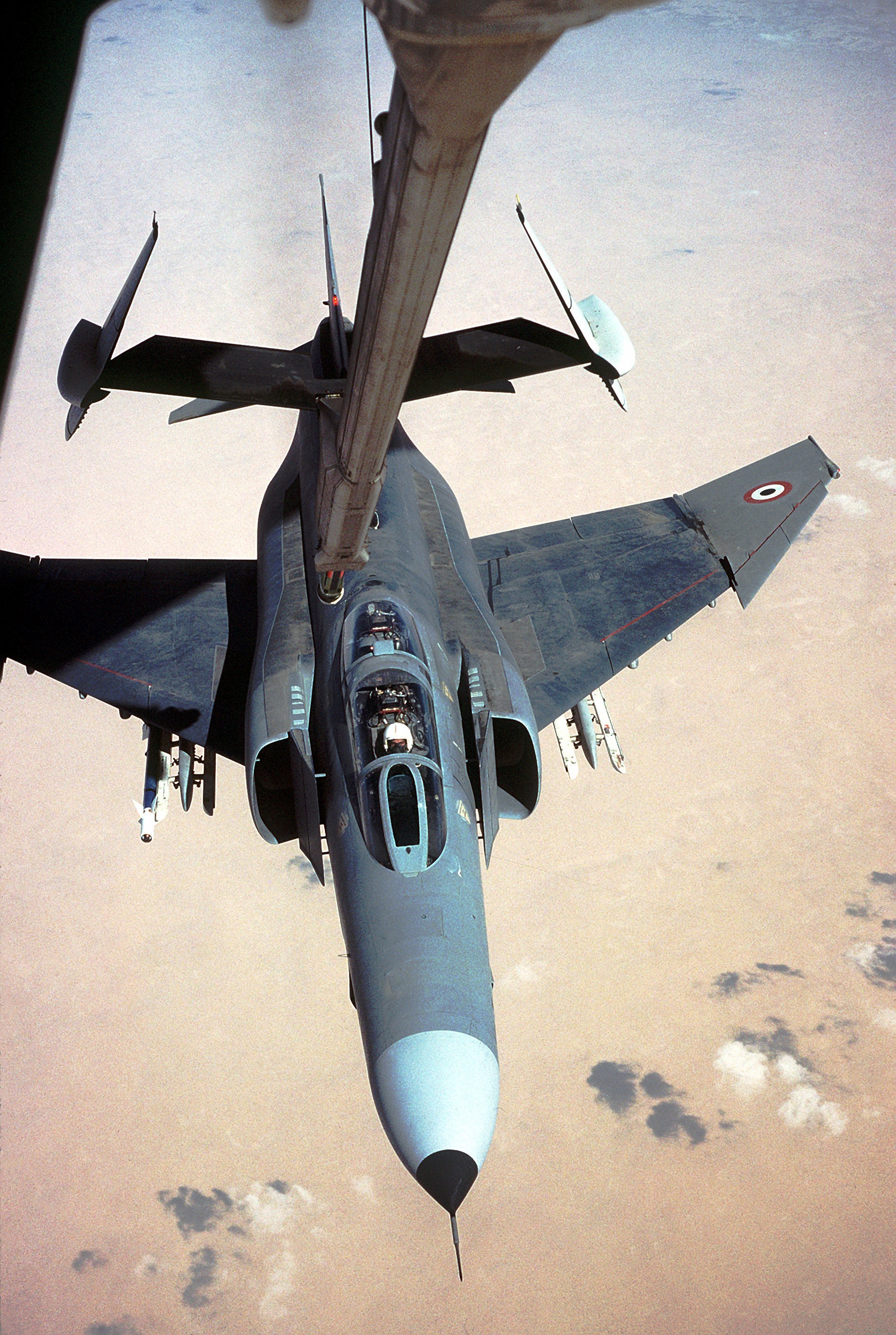
Egyptian Air Force F-4E

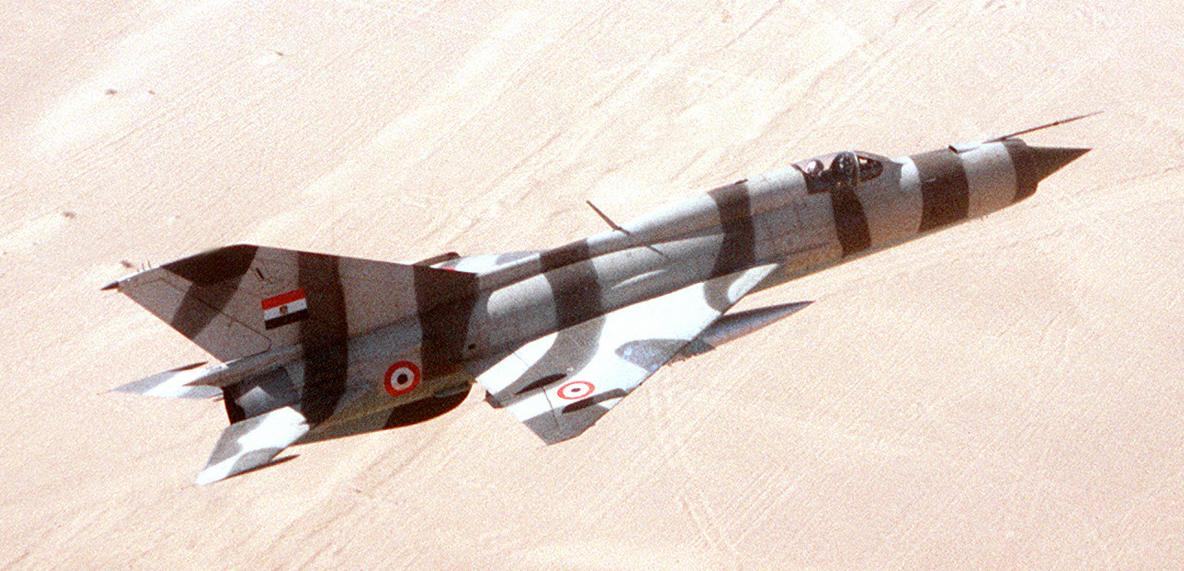
Egyptian Air Force MiG-21 PFM during Operation Bright Star in 1982

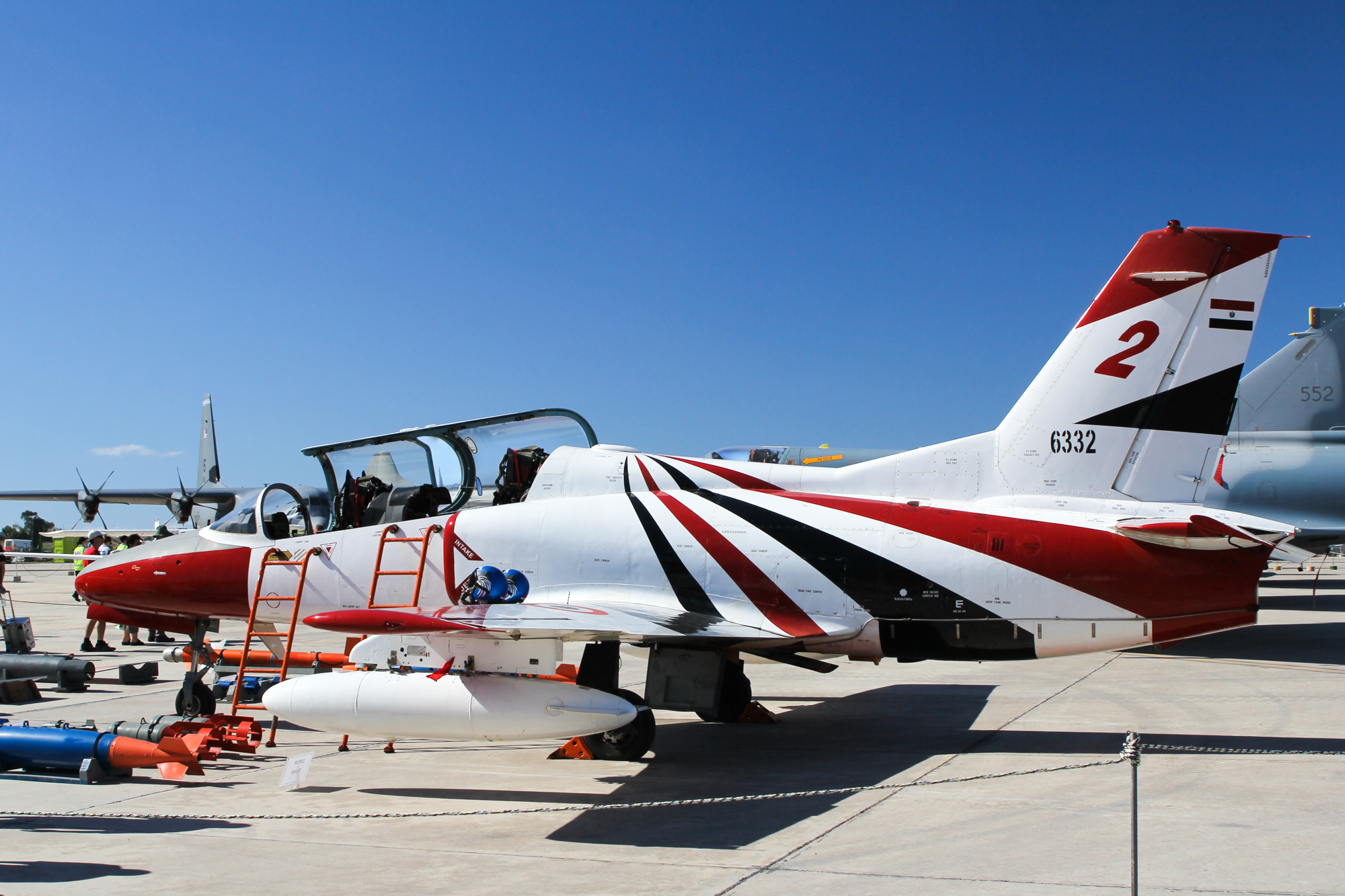
Egyptian Air Force K-8E on display at the 2015 Malta International Airshow

The following is a list of the aircraft operated by the Egyptian Air Force throughout its history.

== List of aircraft used by the Egyptian Air Force ==
=== Fixed Wing ===
Type	Origin	Class	Role	Introduced	In service	Total	Notes
Multi-Role Combat Aircraft
Dassault Mirage 2000BM	France	Jet	Fighter		3		
Dassault Mirage 2000EM	France	Jet	Fighter		15		
Dassault Rafale	France	Jet	Fighter		24	30	30 on order.
Lockheed F-16A Fighting Falcon	United States	Jet	Fighter		32		
Lockheed F-16B Fighting Falcon	United States	Jet	Fighter		8		
Lockheed F-16C Fighting Falcon	United States	Jet	Fighter		218		
Lockheed F-16D Fighting Falcon	United States	Jet	Fighter		42		
Mikoyan MiG-29M/M2	Russia	Jet	Multirole fighter		46		
Attack
Dassault Mirage V 5SDD	France	Jet	Attack		82		(Total refers to all variants)
Dassault Mirage V 5E	France	Jet	Attack		82		(Total refers to all variants)
Dassault Mirage V 5SDE	France	Jet	Attack		82		(Total refers to all variants)
Dassault Mirage V 5DDR	France	Jet	Attack		82		(Total refers to all variants)
AEW
Northrop Grumman E-2C Hawkeye	United States	Propeller	AEW		8		
Reconnaissance / Maritime Patrol
Beech 1900C	United States	Propeller	Maritime Patrol ELINT		8		
Transport
Antonov An-24	Soviet Union	Propeller	Transport				
Antonov An-74T-200	Ukraine	Jet	Transport		13		
Boeing 707	United States	Jet	Transport		1		Presidential Fleet
Boeing 737	United States	Jet	Transport		4		Presidential Fleet
Dassault Falcon 20	France	Jet	Transport				Presidential Fleet
EADS CASA C-295	Spain	Propeller	Transport		20 (24)		
Gulfstream III	United States	Jet	executive transport				Presidential fleet.
Gulfstream IV	United States	Jet	executive transport		4		Presidential fleet.
Ilyushin Il-76MF	Russia	Jet	Transport		2		
Trainer Aircraft
Aero L-29 Delfin	Czechoslovakia	Jet	Trainer		120		
Aero L-39 Albatros	Czechoslovakia	Jet					
Aero L-59E Super Albatros	Czechoslovakia	Jet	Trainer		48		
Dassault-Dornier Alpha Jet MS1	France/Egypt	Jet	Trainer		30		
Dassault-Dornier Alpha Jet MS2	France/Egypt	Jet	Trainer		14		
Grob G-115E	Germany	Propeller	Trainer				
Hongdu K-8E Karakorum	China/Pakistan	Jet	Trainer		120		
Zlin Z 142C	Czechoslovakia	Propeller	Trainer		48		
Utility
de Havilland Canada DHC-5D Buffalo	Canada	Propeller	Utility		9		
PZL-104 Wilga	Poland	Propeller	Utility				
Reserve aircraft
Chengdu F-7B Airguard	China	Jet	Fighter		in reserve		
Chengdu F-7M Airguard	China	Jet	Fighter		in reserve		
McDonnell Douglas F-4E Phantom II	United States	Jet	Fighter		in reserve		all of them are out of service
Mikoyan-Gurevich MiG-21F-13	Soviet Union	Jet	Fighter		in reserve		Upgraded in Ukraine with advanced avionics and JHMCS to fire the R-73 missile
Mikoyan-Gurevich MiG-21MF	Soviet Union	Jet	Fighter		in reserve		Upgraded in Ukraine with advanced avionics and JHMCS to fire the R-73 missile
Mikoyan-Gurevich MiG-21PF	Soviet Union	Jet	Fighter		in reserve		Upgraded in Ukraine with advanced avionics and JHMCS to fire the R-73 missile
Mikoyan-Gurevich MiG-21UM	Soviet Union	Jet	Fighter		in reserve		Upgraded in Ukraine with advanced avionics and JHMCS to fire the R-73 missile
Mikoyan-Gurevich MiG-21R	Soviet Union	Jet	Fighter		in reserve		Upgraded in Ukraine with advanced avionics and JHMCS to fire the R-73 missile

=== Helicopters ===
Type	Origin	Class	Role	Introduced	In service	Total	Notes
Attack helicopters
Boeing AH-64D Apache	United States	Rotorcraft	Attack	Unknown	46	Unknown	About to get more upgraded
Kamov Ka-52	Russia	Rotorcraft	Attack/Scout	Unknown	46	Unknown	Mostly used in navy
Mil Mi-35	Russia	Rotorcraft	Attack	Unknown	14	Unknown	
Assault helicopters
Mil Mi-8T	Soviet Union	Rotorcraft	Assault/ Medium Lift	Unknown		Unknown	(Total refers to all variants)
Mil Mi-8TVK	Soviet Union	Rotorcraft	Assault/ Medium Lift	Unknown		Unknown	(Total refers to all variants)
Mil Mi-8PPA	Soviet Union	Rotorcraft	Assault/ Medium Lift	Unknown		Unknown	(Total refers to all variants)
Mil Mi-8MV	Soviet Union	Rotorcraft	Assault/ Medium Lift	Unknown		Unknown	(Total refers to all variants)
Mil Mi-8R	Soviet Union	Rotorcraft	Assault/ Medium Lift	Unknown		Unknown	(Total refers to all variants)
Mil Mi-8MB	Soviet Union	Rotorcraft	Assault/ Medium Lift	Unknown		Unknown	(Total refers to all variants)
Mil Mi-8K	Soviet Union	Rotorcraft	Assault/ Medium Lift	Unknown		Unknown	(Total refers to all variants)
Mil Mi-17H	Russia	Rotorcraft	Assault/ Medium Lift	Unknown	27	Unknown	
Sikorsky UH-60A	United States	Rotorcraft	Assault/CSAR	Unknown	22	Unknown	
Sikorsky UH-60M	United States	Rotorcraft	Assault/CSAR	Unknown	4	Unknown	
Transport helicopters
Boeing CH-47C	United States	Rotorcraft	Heavy Lift	Unknown	3	Unknown	
Boeing CH-47D	United States	Rotorcraft	Heavy Lift	Unknown	16	Unknown	
Westland Commando Mk. 1	United Kingdom	Rotorcraft	Medium Lift	Unknown	5	Unknown	including 2 in Presidential fleet.
Westland Commando Mk. 2	United Kingdom	Rotorcraft	Medium Lift	Unknown	19	Unknown	including 2 in Presidential fleet.
Westland Commando Mk. 2E	United Kingdom	Rotorcraft	Medium Lift	Unknown	4	Unknown	including 2 in Presidential fleet.
Reconnaissance helicopters
Aérospatiale SA-342K Gazelle	France	Rotorcraft	Scout	Unknown	108	Unknown	(Total refers to both variants)
Aérospatiale SA-342L Gazelle	France	Rotorcraft	Scout	Unknown	108	Unknown	(Total refers to both variants)
Hiller UH-12E	United States	Rotorcraft	Multipurpose	Unknown	18	Unknown	
Helicopter
Kaman SH-2G Super Seasprite	United States	Rotorcraft	ASW	Unknown	13	Unknown	(Total refers to both variants)
Kaman SH-2E Super Seasprite	United States	Rotorcraft	ASW	Unknown	13	Unknown	(Total refers to both variants)
Sikorsky SH-3 Sea King	United States	Rotorcraft	ASW/Utility	Unknown	28	Unknown	
Westland Sea King Mk. 47	United Kingdom	Rotorcraft	ASW	Unknown	6	Unknown	

== Historical use ==
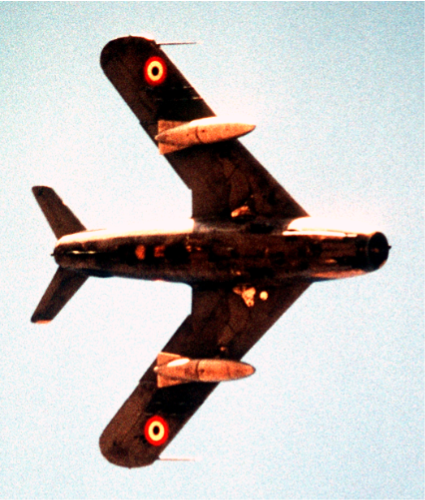
Egyptian Air Force MiG-17

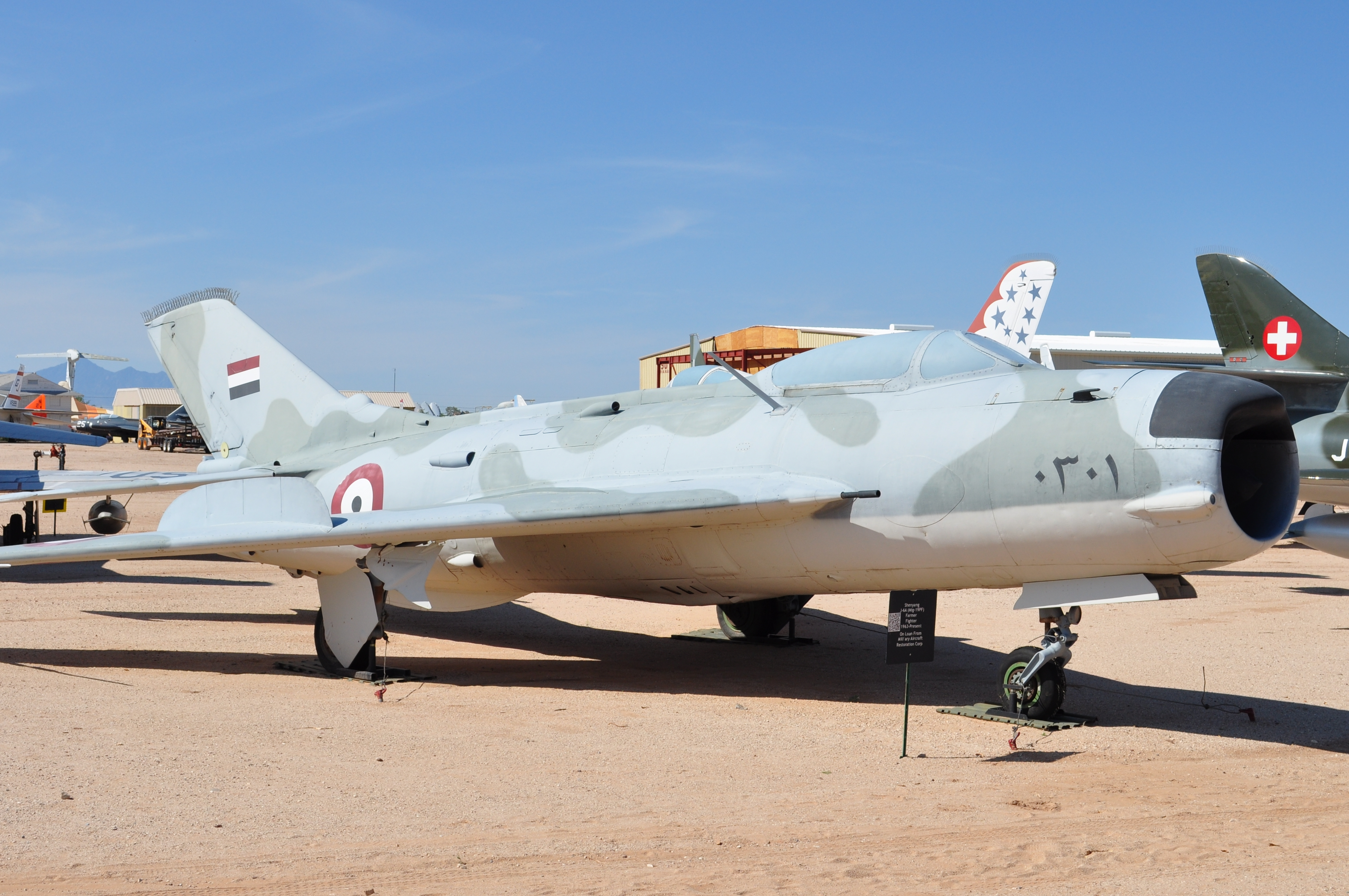
Egyptian Air Force Shenyang J-6

Type	Origin	Class	Role	Introduced	Retired	Total	Notes
Fighters
Curtiss P-40 Tomahawk IIA	United States	Propeller	Fighter				
de Havilland Vampire FB.52	United Kingdom	Jet	Fighter				
de Havilland Vampire T.55	United Kingdom	Jet	Fighter				
Fiat G55	Italy	Propeller	Fighter		reserve		
Gloster Gladiator I	United Kingdom	Propeller	Fighter				
Gloster Gladiator II	United Kingdom	Propeller	Fighter				
Gloster Meteor F.4/F.8	United Kingdom	Jet	Fighter				
Gloster Meteor F.7	United Kingdom	Jet	Fighter				
Gloster Meteor NF.13	United Kingdom	Jet	Fighter				
Hawker Hurricane IIC	United Kingdom	Propeller	Fighter				
Hawker Sea Fury NX798 prototype	United Kingdom	Propeller	Fighter	1948		1	
Hawker Sea Fury FB.11	United Kingdom	Propeller	Fighter	1949		14	2 Iraqi aircraft + 12 newly built examples.
Macchi MC205V	Italy	Propeller	Fighter				
Mikoyan-Gurevich MiG-17F	Soviet Union	Jet	Fighter		in reserve		
Lim-6	Poland	Jet	Fighter				Polish version license MiG-17
Mikoyan-Gurevich MiG-19SF	Soviet Union	Jet	Fighter		in reserve		
Mikoyan-Gurevich MiG-23B	Soviet Union	Jet	Fighter		in reserve		
Republic P-47	United States	Propeller	Fighter				
Supermarine Spitfire V	United Kingdom	Propeller	Fighter				
Supermarine Spitfire IX	United Kingdom	Propeller	Fighter				
Supermarine Spitfire F.22	United Kingdom	Propeller	Fighter				
Attack
Sukhoi Su-7BMK	Soviet Union	Jet	Attack		in reserve		
Sukhoi Su-20C	Soviet Union	Jet	Attack		in reserve		
Bombers
Avro 674	United Kingdom	Propeller	Light Bomber				
Avro Lancaster B.I	United Kingdom	Propeller	Bomber				
Fairey Gordon	United Kingdom	Propeller	Light Bomber				
Handley Page Halifax	United Kingdom	Propeller	Bomber				
Hawker Egyptian Audax	United Kingdom	Propeller	Light Bomber			34	
Hawker Hart	United Kingdom	Propeller	Light Bomber				
Ilyushin Il-28	Soviet Union	Jet	Medium Bomber			80	
Short Stirling IV	United Kingdom	Propeller	Bomber				
Tupolev Tu-16	Soviet Union	Jet	Bomber			30	
Transport
Antonov An-12	Soviet Union	Propeller	Transport			32	
Avro 618 Ten	United Kingdom	Propeller	Transport				
Avro 652	United Kingdom	Propeller	Transport				
Avro Commodore	United Kingdom	Propeller	Transport				
Curtiss C-46D Commando	United States	Propeller	Transport				
de Havilland DH.104 Dove	United Kingdom	Propeller	Transport				
de Havilland Dragon Rapide	United Kingdom	Propeller	Transport				
Douglas C-47 Dakota	United States	Propeller	Transport/ Bomber				
Ilyushin Il-14P	Soviet Union	Propeller	Transport			70	
Lockheed Lodestar	United States	Propeller	Transport				
Noorduyn Norseman	Canada	Propeller	Transport	1948		2	2 captured Israeli examples.
Westland Wessex	United Kingdom	Propeller	Transport			1	
Trainer
Airspeed Oxford	United Kingdom	Propeller	Trainer				
Avro 626	United Kingdom	Propeller	Trainer				
Avro Anson I	United Kingdom	Propeller	Trainer				
Avro Anson XIX	United Kingdom	Propeller	Trainer				
Avro Anson XXII	United Kingdom	Propeller	Trainer				
Beech D-18S	United States	Propeller	Trainer				
de Havilland DH.60T Moth	United Kingdom	Propeller	Trainer				
de Havilland Canada DHC-1 Chipmunk	Canada/United Kingdom	Propeller	Trainer				
EMB-312 Tucano	Brazil	Propeller	Trainer			54	
HA Gomhouria	Egypt	Propeller	Trainer				Locally produced version of the Bücker Bü 181.
HA-200 Al-Qahirah	Egypt	Jet	Trainer				Locally produced version of the Hispano HA-200.
Helwan HA-300	Egypt	Jet	Trainer		1969		Experimental, never went into production.
Mikoyan-Gurevich MiG-15bis	Soviet Union	Jet	Trainer				
Mikoyan-Gurevich MiG-15UTI	Soviet Union	Jet	Trainer				
Miles M.14A Magister	United Kingdom	Propeller	Trainer			42	
Miles M.19 Master II	United Kingdom	Propeller	Trainer				
North American T-6 Texan	United States	Propeller	Trainer				
Shenyang FT-6	China	Jet	Trainer			18	
Supermarine Spitfire T.9	United Kingdom	Propeller	Trainer				
Yakovlev Yak-11	Soviet Union	Propeller	Trainer				
Yakovlev Yak-18	Soviet Union	Propeller	Trainer				
Zlín Z-226T	Czechoslovakia	Propeller	Trainer				
Presidential
Airbus A340-200	France	Jet	Presidential			1	Used by The President
Boeing 747	United States	Jet	Presidential				
Flying Boat
Consolidated PBY Catalina	United States	Propeller	Flying Boat				
Grumman Mallard	United States	Propeller	Flying Boat				
Supermarine Sea Otter	United Kingdom	Propeller	Flying Boat				
Utility
Macchi MB.308	Italy	Propeller	Utility				
Morane-Saulnier MS-502	France	Propeller	Utility				
Mráz M.1D Sokol	Czechoslovakia	Propeller	Utility				
Műegyetemi Sportrepülő Egyesület M-24	Hungary	Propeller	Utility			2	
Percival Q.6 Petrel	United Kingdom	Propeller	Utility				
Piper Super Cub	United States	Propeller	Utility				
Westland Lysander	United Kingdom	Propeller	Utility				
Transport helicopters
Mil Mi-2	Poland	Rotorcraft	Utility				
Mil Mi-4	Soviet Union	Rotorcraft	Medium Lift			70	
Mil Mi-6	Soviet Union	Rotorcraft	Heavy Lift			20	
Sikorsky S-61AD	United States	Rotorcraft	Medium Lift	1975		2	
Westland Dragonfly	United Kingdom	Rotorcraft	Utility			2	

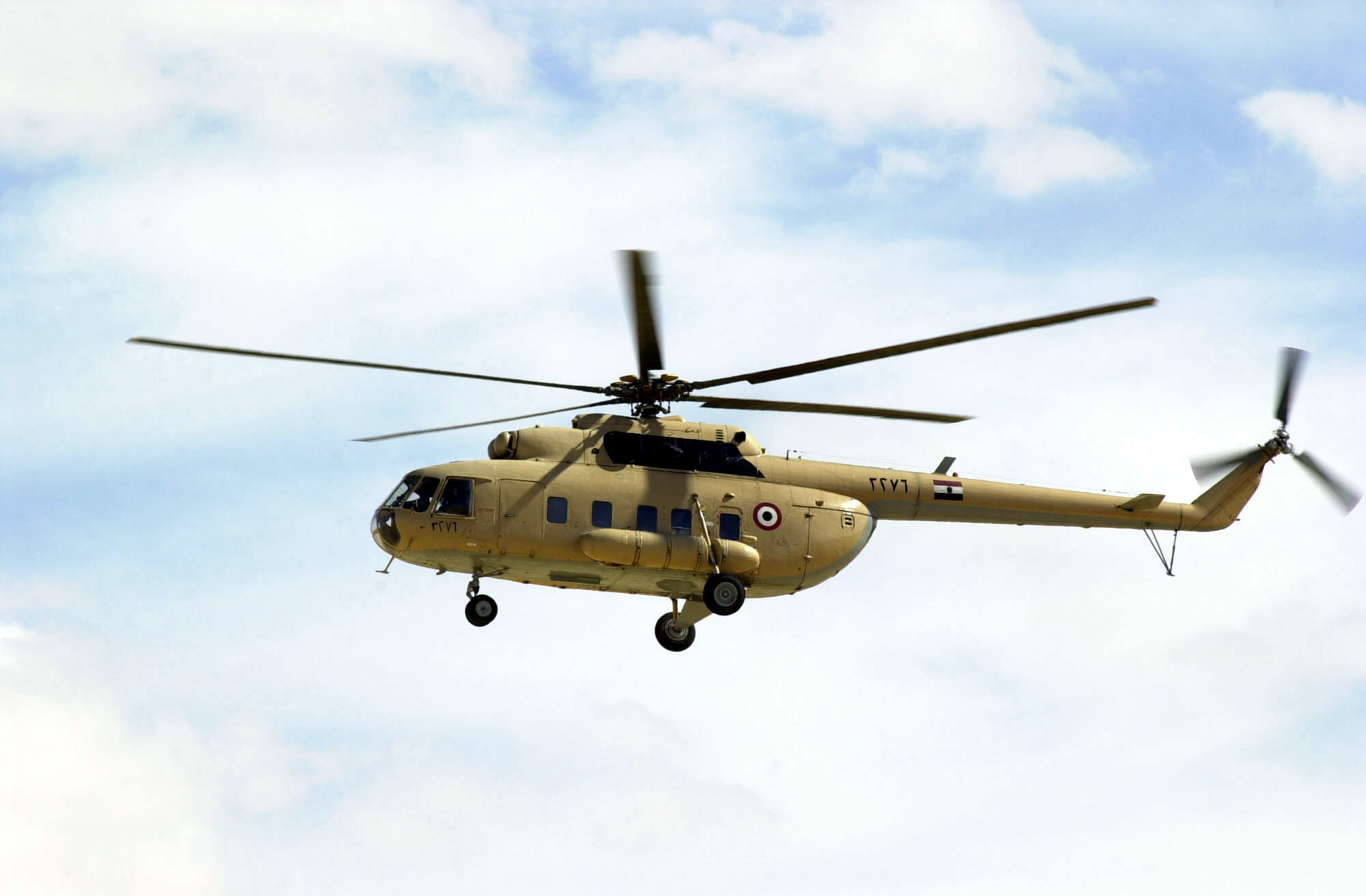
Egyptian Air Force Mi-8 Hip
