= NPR-1 =

NPR-1 may refer to:

- NPR-1, the original designation of PWS-35 Ogar aircraft
- Naval Petroleum Reserve No. 1, the former name of Elk Hills Oil Field

== See also ==
- NPR1, human gene
- NPR One, radio app
