= Beneš-Mráz Be-56 Beta-Major =

1930s Czech aircraft

Be-56 Beta-Major
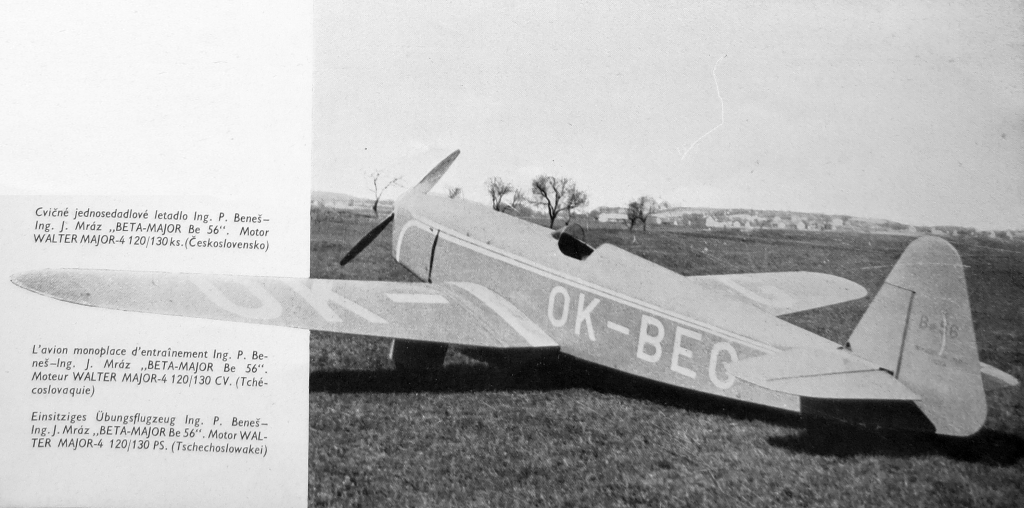
- Be-56 Beta-major single-seater

General information
- Type: Sports plane
- Manufacturer: Beneš-Mráz
- Designer: Pavel Beneš and Jaroslav Mráz
- Number built: 1 x Be-52; 1 x Be-56

History
- First flight: 20 July 1936
- Developed from: Beneš-Mráz Be-50 Beta-Minor

The Beneš-Mráz Be-56 Beta-Major was a single-seat aerobatic advanced trainer manufactured in Czechoslovakia shortly before World War II.

== Design and development ==
First flown in 1936, the Be-56 was a low-wing cantilever monoplane of wooden construction, with a single open cockpit and fixed tailwheel undercarriage. A two-seat version was produced as the Beneš-Mráz Be-52 Beta-Major, with tandem open cockpits

== Variants ==
Be-52 Beta-Major
Two-seat aerobatic trainer derived from the Be-51, but powered by a Walter Major engine; one built.
Be-56 Beta-Major
Single-seat version of the Be-52; one built (OK-BEG).

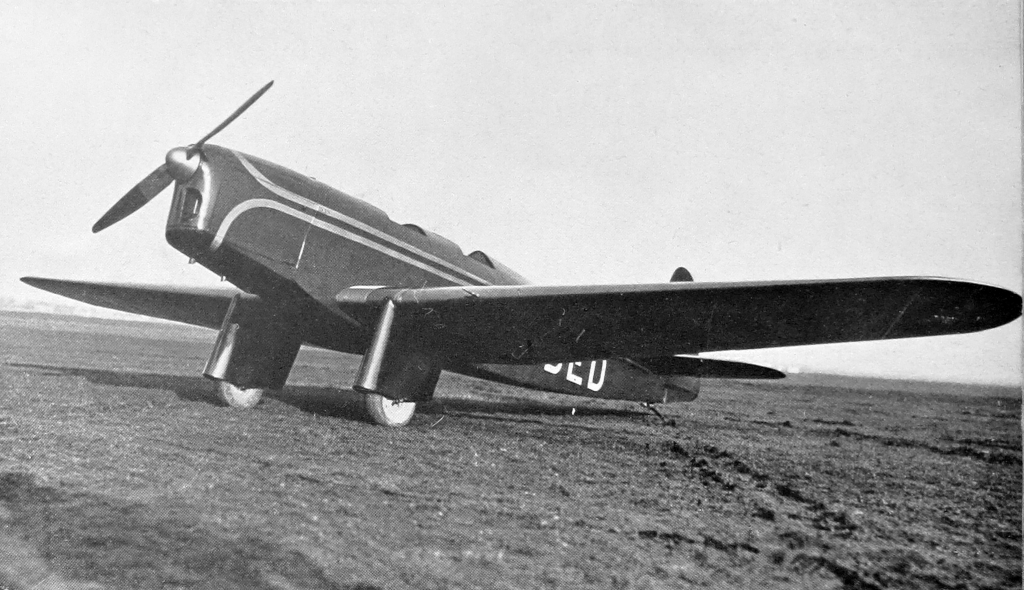
Be-52 Beta-Major two-seater

== Operational history ==
The sole Be-56, registered OK-BEG, was used by the Slovak Air Force after the German takeover of Czechoslovakia in 1939.

== Operators ==
Slovakia

- Slovak Air Force (1939–1945)

== Specifications (Be-56) ==
Data from Jane's all the World's Aircraft 1937

General characteristics

- Crew: 1
- Length: 7.55 m (24 ft 9 in)
- Wingspan: 10.66 m (35 ft 0 in)
- Height: 2.02 m (6 ft 8 in)
- Wing area: 14.00 m^{2} (150.7 sq ft)
- Empty weight: 530 kg (1,168 lb)
- Max takeoff weight: 710 kg (1,565 lb)
- Fuel capacity: 100 L (26 US gal; 22 imp gal) in two wing root tanks
- Powerplant: 1 × Walter Major 4-cyl. inverted air-cooled in-line piston engine, 97 kW (130 hp) for take-off
- Propellers: 2-bladed fixed-pitch propeller

Performance

- Maximum speed: 240 km/h (150 mph, 130 kn) at sea level
- Cruise speed: 205 km/h (127 mph, 111 kn)
- Landing speed Be-52: 62 km/h (39 mph; 33 kn)
- Range: 600 km (370 mi, 320 nmi)
- Service ceiling: 6,000 m (20,000 ft)
- Absolute ceiling: 6,500 m (21,300 ft)
- Time to altitude: 1,000 m (3,300 ft) in 3 minutes, 3,000 m (9,800 ft) in 11 minutes 30 seconds
- Wing loading: 50.7 kg/m^{2} (10.4 lb/sq ft)
- Power/mass: 7.23 kg/kW (11.88 lb/hp)
