= PZL.27 =

P.Z.L. 27
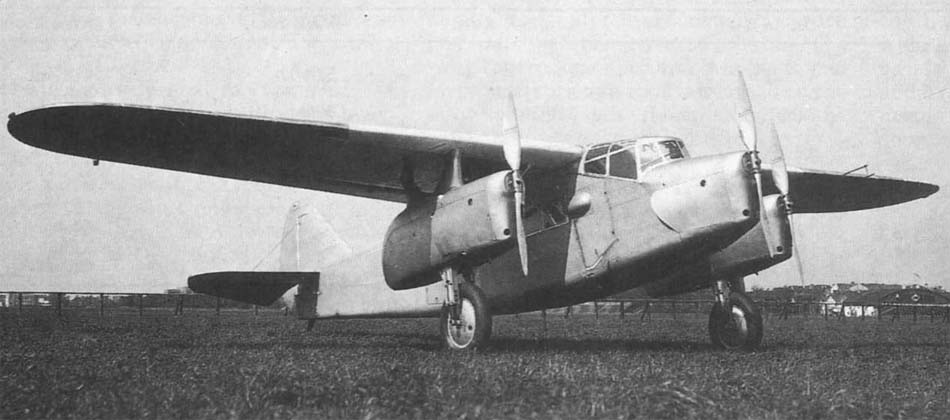
- P.Z.L. 27 prototype

General information
- Type: Airliner / Mail-plane
- Manufacturer: P.Z.L.
- Designer: Zbysław Ciołkosz
- Status: prototype only
- Primary users: LOT Polish Airlines (P.L.L. - Polskie Linie Lotnicze LOT S.A.) Polish Air Force
- Number built: 1

History
- First flight: September 1934

The P.Z.L. 27 was a prototype airliner/mail plane designed by Zbysław Ciołkosz and constructed at P.Z.L. in 1933.

== Design and development ==
Ordered by the Polish Ministry of Transport as a fast mail-plane, the prototype flew for the first time in September 1933 and was the first P.Z.L. aircraft with a retractable landing gear. Several tests made at the Institute of Aviation in 1935–1936 showed that the plane had poor performance and was uneconomical to operate.

== Technical design ==
Construction of the P.Z.L. 27 consisted of a welded steel tube fuselage and tail-unit covered with fabric and a wooden 2-spar wing. Three 130 hp (97 kW) de Havilland Gipsy Major I engines were fitted, one in the nose and two in strut-mounted nacelles under the high-set wings. The retractable landing gear retracted manually into the rear of the engine nacelles, with a non-retractable tail-skid at the extreme rear of the fuselage.

== Operational history ==
After initial flight testing the prototype P.Z.L. 27 the aircraft was returned to P.Z.L. to have a revised wing fitted to alleviate problems with insufficient stiffness and poor lateral stability. After a second phase of testing a Certificate of Airworthiness was issued and the aircraft was equipped for use as an airliner, being delivered to P.L.L. (LOT). LOT used the aircraft for proving flights on mail routes but regarded it as obsolete, refusing to order production aircraft. The RWD 11, designed in competition with the P.Z.L. 27, was regarded as superior but this aircraft also failed to attract production orders.

After accumulating 70 hours flying with LOT, the P.Z.L. 27 was bought by the Polish Air Force for the I.T.L. (Instytut Techniczny Lotnictwa – Technical Aviation Institute). It was used for transport, but crashed in an accident near Piaseczno in 1937, when piloted by Andrzej Włodarkiewicz.

== Operators ==
Poland

- LOT Polish Airlines operated the sole prototype.
- Polish Air Force

== Specifications (P.Z.L. 27) ==
Data from Polish Aircraft 1893–1939.

General characteristics

- Crew: 2
- Capacity: 5
- Length: 10.74 m (35 ft 3 in)
- Wingspan: 13.6 m (44 ft 7 in)
- Height: 2.52 m (8 ft 3 in)
- Wing area: 25.2 m^{2} (271 sq ft)
- Empty weight: 1,470 kg (3,241 lb) (fully equipped, including radio)
- Gross weight: 2,320 kg (5,115 lb)
- Powerplant: 3 × de Havilland Gipsy Major I 4-cyl. inverted in-line air-cooled piston engine, 97 kW (130 hp) each
- Propellers: 2-bladed Szomański wooden, fixed pitch

Performance

- Maximum speed: 266 km/h (165 mph, 144 kn) at sea level
- Cruise speed: 238 km/h (148 mph, 129 kn)
- Range: 700 km (430 mi, 380 nmi)
- Service ceiling: 4,800 m (15,700 ft)
- Rate of climb: 4.6 m/s (910 ft/min)
- Time to altitude: 1,000m in 3min 37s
- Wing loading: 92.5 kg/m^{2} (18.9 lb/sq ft)
- Power/mass: 0.125 kW/kg

== See also ==
Aircraft of comparable role, configuration, and era

- RWD-11
