= Beneš-Mráz Bibi =

Be-550 Bibi
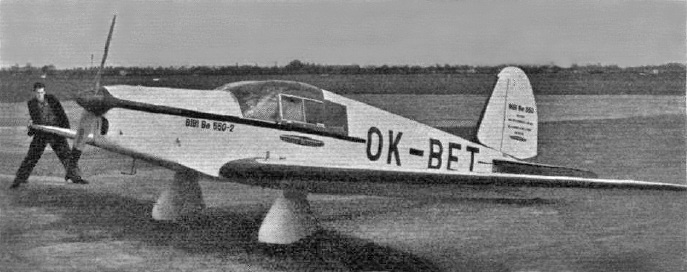
- Beneš-Mráz Be.550 Bibi, 1939

General information
- Type: Sporting aircraft
- Manufacturer: Beneš-Mráz
- Designer: Pavel Beneš and Jaroslav Mráz
- Number built: ca. 18

History
- Introduction date: 1936
- First flight: 1936

The Beneš-Mráz Bibi was a 1930s Czechoslovak two-seat touring aircraft.

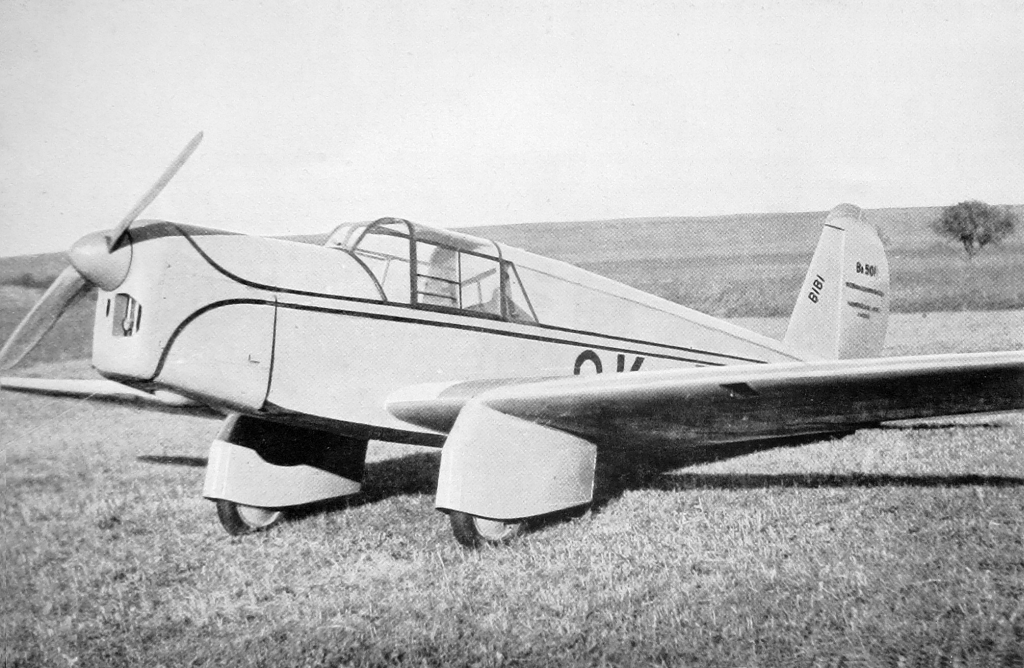
Walter Mikron and Beneš-Mráz Be-501 Bibi (1936)

== Design and development ==
The Bibi was designed and manufactured by Beneš-Mráz, developed from the Beta-Minor design. The Bibi was a lighter, smaller aircraft in which the seats were side-by-side instead of in tandem, and the cockpits were fully enclosed, retaining the Beta-Minor's cantilever low-wing cantilever monoplane layout, with fixed tailwheel undercarriage. Development of the Bibi began with the Be-501 two-seat cabin tourer, and culminated with the Be-555 Super Bibi.

== Operational history ==
One example of the Be-550 Bibi (OK-BET) was imported into the United Kingdom, stored during World War II, then registered as G-AGSR until a fatal crash in 1951.

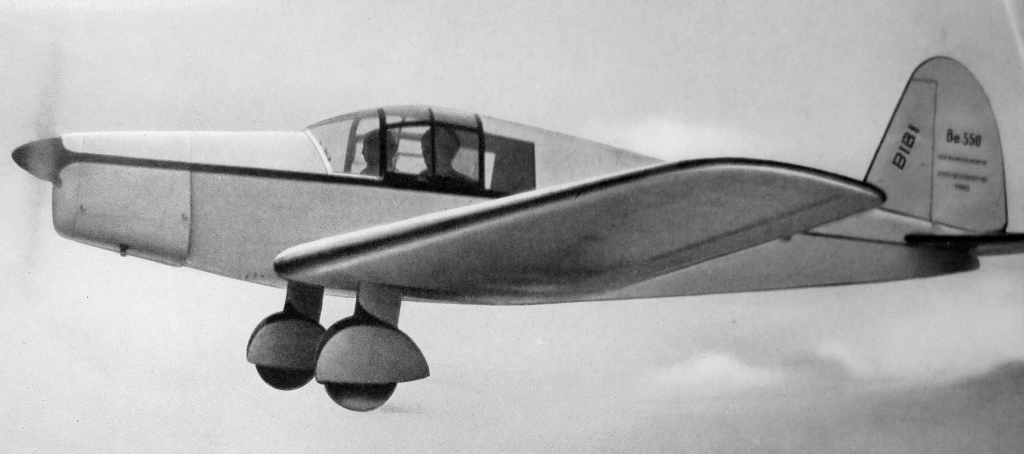
Walter Mikron and Beneš-Mráz Be-550 Bibi (1936)

== Variants ==
Be-501 Bibi
Single seat, initial development aircraft for the Bibi cabin tourer.
Be-502 Bibi
Single seat development prototype for the Bibi series.
Be-550 Bibi
Initial production version introduced in 1936, with at least six built, including single exports to Egypt and the UK.
Be-555 Super Bibi
The final iteration of the Bibi with many improvements. Production continued after the start of WWII, with at least ten built.

== Specifications (Be-550) ==
Data from L'Année Aéronautique 1938–1939

General characteristics

- Crew: Two
- Length: 7.31 m (24 ft 0 in)
- Wingspan: 11.51 m (37 ft 9 in)
- Height: 1.90 m (6 ft 3 in)
- Wing area: 14.0 m^{2} (151 sq ft)
- Empty weight: 330 kg (728 lb)
- Gross weight: 560 kg (1,235 lb)
- Powerplant: 1 × Walter Mikron II air-cooled 4-cylinder inverted inline engine, 45 kW (60 hp)

Performance

- Maximum speed: 200 km/h (120 mph, 110 kn) at 100 m (330 ft)
- Cruise speed: 175 km/h (109 mph, 94 kn)
- Range: 780 km (480 mi, 420 nmi)
- Service ceiling: 5,200 m (17,100 ft)
- Time to altitude: 6 min 30 s to 1,000 m (3,300 ft)
