= Walter Scolar =

1930s Czech piston aircraft engine

Scolar
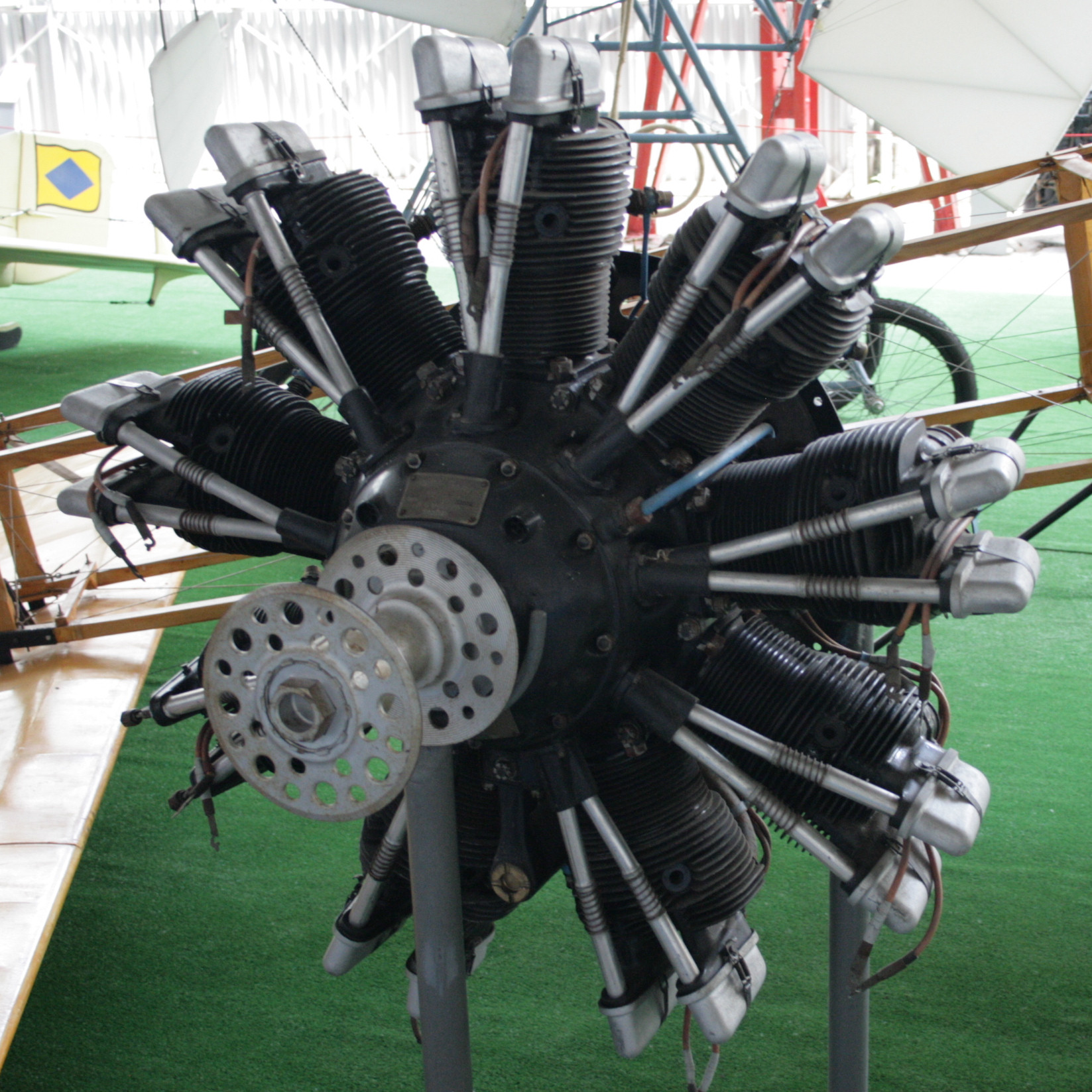
- Walter Scolar
- Type: Radial aero engine
- National origin: Czechoslovakia
- Manufacturer: Walter Aircraft Engines
- First run: 1936

The Walter Scolar was a Czechoslovak nine-cylinder, air-cooled radial engine for powering light aircraft that first ran in 1936. With a displacement of 8 litres (490 cu in), it produced 132 kW (180 hp) at 2,500 rpm.

== Applications ==
- Beneš-Mráz Beta-Scolar

== Engines on display ==
Preserved examples of the Walter Skolar engine are on display at the following museums:

- Muzeum Letectva, Košice
- Prague Aviation Museum, Kbely

== Specifications (Scolar) ==
Data from Kosice Air Museum

=== General characteristics ===
- Type: 9-cylinder radial piston engine
- Bore: 105 mm (4.13 in)
- Stroke: 100 mm (3.94 in)
- Displacement: 7.8 L (488 cu in)
- Dry weight: 155 kg (342 lb)

=== Components ===
- Valvetrain: One intake and one exhaust valve per cylinder
- Fuel system: Carburettor
- Fuel type: Petrol
- Cooling system: Air-cooled

=== Performance ===
- Power output: 132 kW (180 hp) at 2,500 rpm
- Compression ratio: 5.4:1
- Power-to-weight ratio: 0.85 kW/kg (0.52 hp/lb)

== See also ==
Comparable engines

- Alvis Leonides
- Siemens-Halske Sh 12
- Wolseley Aries

Related lists

- List of aircraft engines
