= Beneš-Mráz Be-60 Bestiola =

Beneš-Mráz Be-60
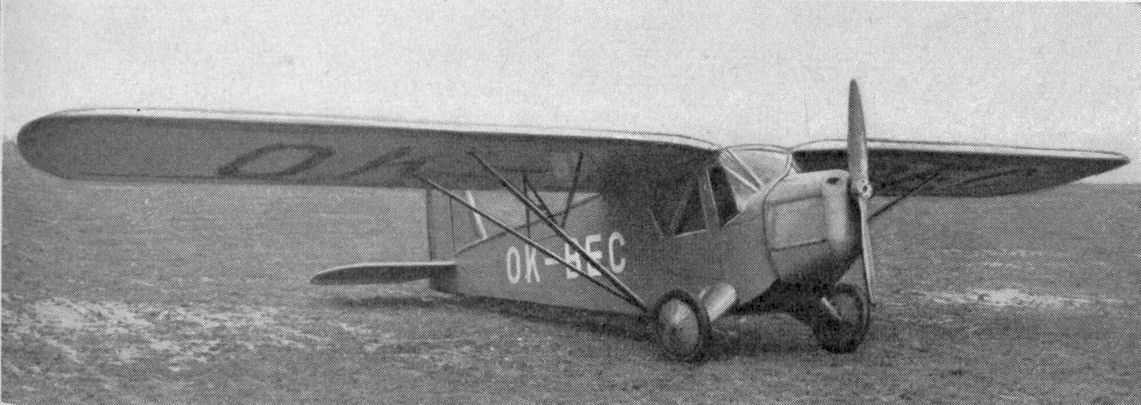

General information
- Type: Light aircraft
- National origin: Czechoslovakia
- Manufacturer: Beneš-Mráz

History
- First flight: November 1935

The Beneš-Mráz Be-60 Bestiola was a Czechoslovak light aircraft produced in the 1930s. The highwing monoplane had two side-by-side seats in an enclosed cabin, braced wings, and a fixed undercarriage. It was first flown in 1935, undergoing testing quickly. Twenty of these aircraft were then sent out to Czechoslovak flying clubs from April to November 1936.

== Specifications ==
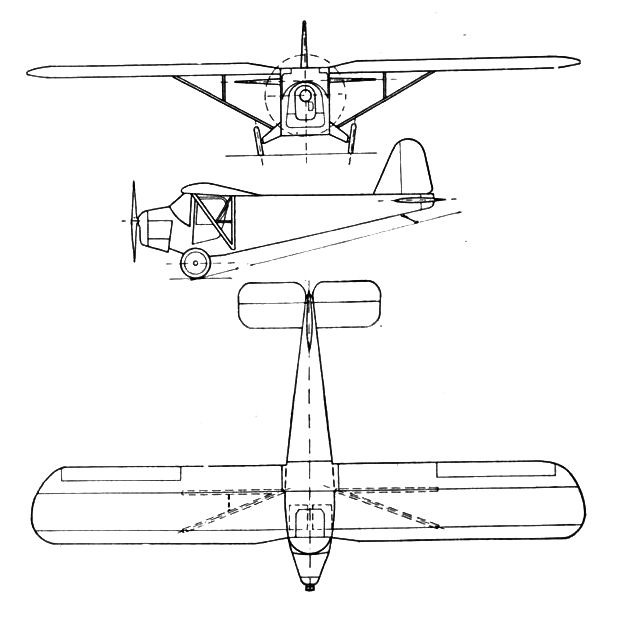
Beneš-Mráz Be-60 3-view drawing from L'Aerophile June 1936

General characteristics

- Crew: 2
- Length: 6.65 m (21 ft 10 in)
- Wingspan: 11.2 m (36 ft 9 in)
- Wing area: 15.2 m^{2} (164 sq ft)
- Empty weight: 290 kg (639 lb)
- Gross weight: 490 kg (1,080 lb)
- Powerplant: 1 × Walter Mikron II inline piston engine, 48 kW (65 hp)

Performance

- Maximum speed: 150 km/h (93 mph, 81 kn)
- Cruise speed: 125 km/h (78 mph, 67 kn)
- Range: 470 km (290 mi, 250 nmi)
- Service ceiling: 3,400 m (11,200 ft)
