= Zlín XIII =

Czech light aircraft

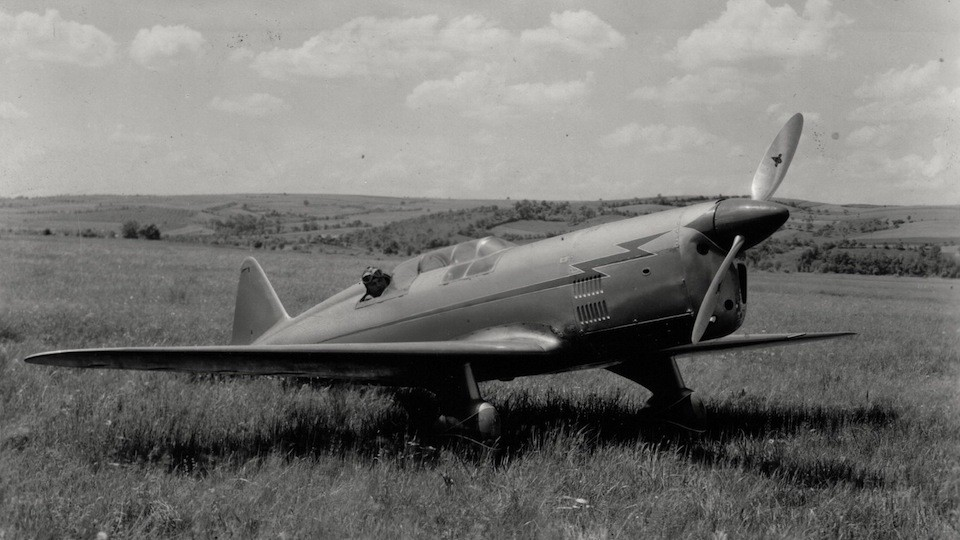
- In two seat configuration

General information
- Type: Racing aircraft
- National origin: Czechoslovakia
- Manufacturer: Zlínská letecká společnost, a. s. (Zlín)
- Designer: Jaroslav Lonek
- Status: Museum
- Number built: 1

History
- First flight: 1937

The Zlín XIII was a fast single or two seat aircraft, designed and built in Czechoslovakia in the late 1930s. Its development was ended by the disruption of Czechoslovakia in the approach to World War II.

== Design and development ==
The Zlín XIII was a very aerodynamically clean, low-powered, all wood monoplane with a one-piece, low set, tapered wing equipped with flaps. It was powered by a 97 kW (130 hp) Walter Minor four cylinder inverted engine, driving a two blade propeller and with a fixed, faired tailwheel undercarriage. The enclosed cockpit placed the pilot well behind the wing trailing edge with a passenger seat ahead of him; a change of canopy to a shorter version, together with a forward fairing, removed the forward seat. This versatility was intended to allow the type XIII to operate as either a high speed executive transport or as a single seat competition aircraft.

The Zlín XIII was displayed as a two seater at the 10th Prague Aero Show in July 1937, having made its first flight earlier in the year. It was entered into the French Circuit de l'Est race, but arrived late too late to compete. The German annexation of the Sudetenland in 1938, and the subsequent fragmentation of Czechoslovakia ended development and prevented production, so only the prototype was built.

== Aircraft on display ==
The sole Zlín XIII, in single seat form, is on exhibit at the National Technical Museum in Prague, Czech Republic.

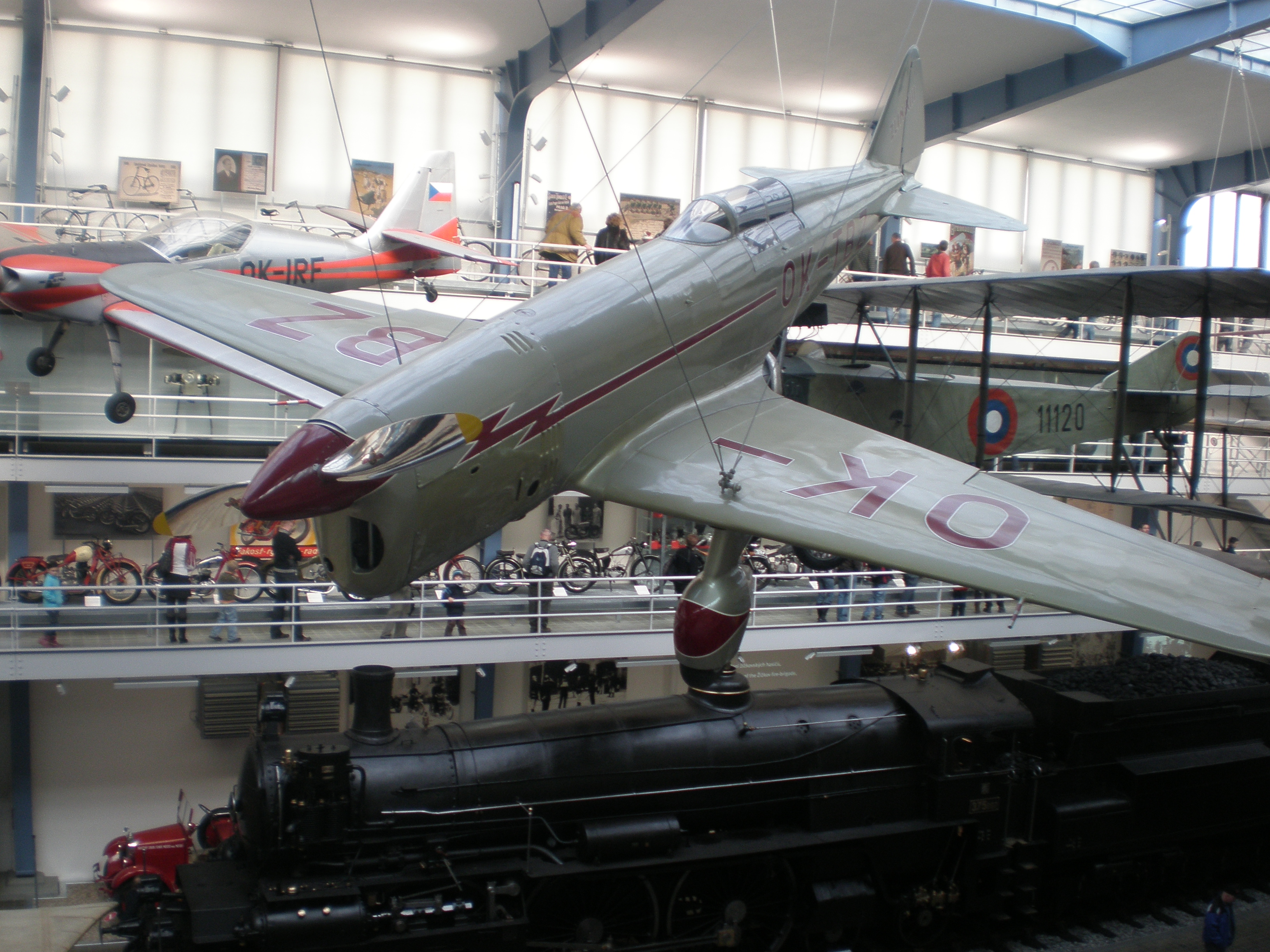
In single seat form

== Specifications ==
Data from National Technical Museum (Prague)

General characteristics

- Crew: 1 or 2
- Length: 6.8 m (22 ft 4 in)
- Wingspan: 7.0 m (23 ft 0 in)
- Empty weight: 450 kg (992 lb)
- Gross weight: 650 kg (1,433 lb)
- Powerplant: 1 × Walter Major-4 four cylinder inverted inline, air cooled, 97 kW (130 hp)
- Propellers: 2-bladed Ratier

Performance

- Maximum speed: 300 km/h (190 mph, 160 kn)
- Range: 700 km (430 mi, 380 nmi)
- Service ceiling: 5,600 m (18,400 ft)
- Time to altitude: 3.25 min to 1,000 m (3,281 ft)
