= Walter Major =

1930s Czech piston aircraft engine range

Major
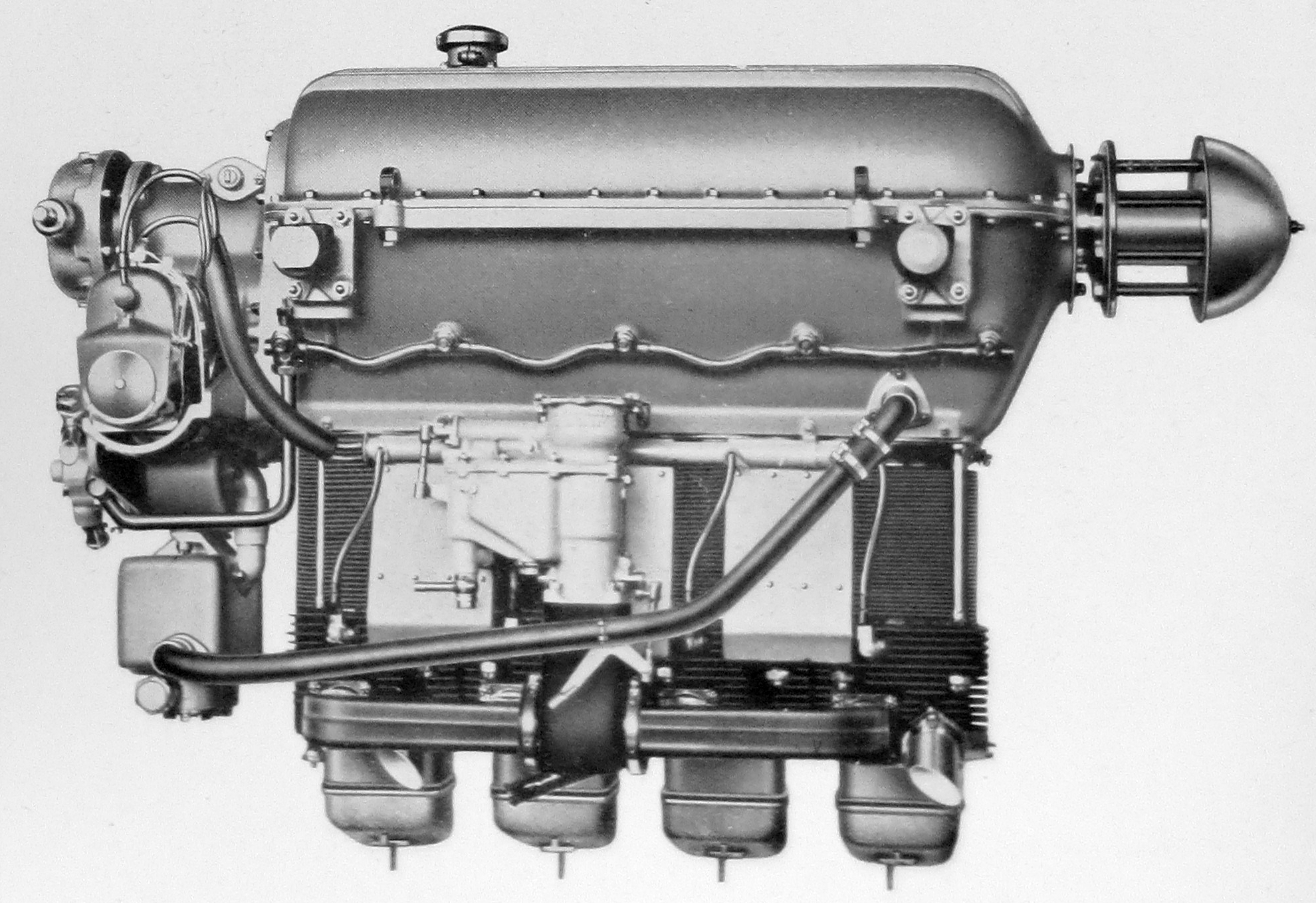
- Walter Major 4 (1934)
- Type: Inline piston engine
- National origin: Czechoslovakia
- Manufacturer: Walter Aircraft Engines
- First run: 1934

Walter Major was a family of Czechoslovak aircraft inline engines developed by Walter Aircraft Engines in the 1930s.

== Design and development ==
Available in either four or six cylinder configuration, with identical bore and stroke of 118 mm (4.6 in) and 140 mm (5.5 in), respectively, the Walter Majors were primarily used in light aircraft. License-built in Poland by the state-owned Państwowe Zakłady Inżynieryjne (as the PZInż. Major 4), the engine was used in, among others, Zlin Z-XIII, RWD-11 and one of the PWS-35 Ogar prototypes.

== Applications ==
=== Walter Major 4 ===
- Beneš-Mráz Be-50 Beta-Minor
- Beneš-Mráz Be-52
- Beneš-Mráz Be-56
- Beneš-Mráz Be-250
- Beneš-Mráz Be-251
- González Gil-Pazó GP-4
- PWS-35 Ogar
- RWD 13
- RWD 20
- Spartan Cruiser
- Zlin Z-XIII
- Rubik R-18 Kánya

=== Walter Major 6 ===
- Breda Ba.44
- Caproni Ca.308 Borea
- RWD 11
- Rogožarski SIM-XII-H

== Specifications (Major 4) ==
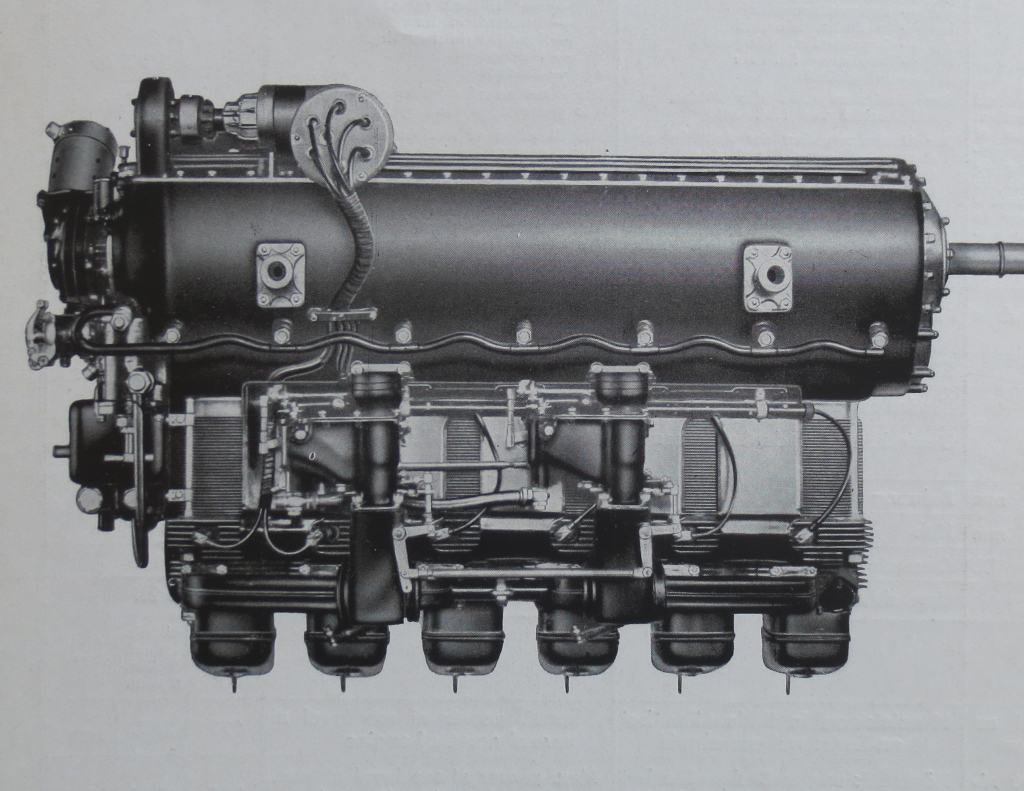
Walter Major 6 (1936)

Data from

=== General characteristics ===
- Type: 4-cylinder inverted inline engine
- Bore: 118 mm
- Stroke: 140 mm
- Dry weight: 140 kg

=== Components ===
- Cooling system: Air-cooled

=== Performance ===
- Power output: 130 hp
- Compression ratio: 5.2:1

== See also ==
Comparable engines

- de Havilland Gipsy Major
- de Havilland Gipsy Six

Related lists

- List of aircraft engines
