= Kubicek M-2 Scout =

Czech ultralight aircraft

M-2 Scout

General information
- Type: Ultralight aircraft and Light-sport aircraft
- National origin: Czech Republic
- Manufacturer: Kubicek Aircraft
- Status: In production (2012)

History
- Introduction date: 2009
- First flight: May 2009
- Developed from: Mráz Skaut

The Kubicek M-2 Scout is a Czech ultralight and light-sport aircraft, designed and produced by Kubicek Aircraft. It was first flown in May 2009. The aircraft is supplied as a complete ready-to-fly-aircraft.

In Czech the manufacturer refers to itself as Kubíček Aircraft but in English they call themselves Kubicek Aircraft.

== Design and development ==
The aircraft was intended as an update to the 1948 Mráz M-2 Skaut (English: Scout) design. The original M-2 was made from wood, and so the two aircraft resemble each other only superficially. The new M-2 was designed to comply with the Fédération Aéronautique Internationale microlight rules and US light-sport aircraft rules. It features a cantilever low-wing, a two-seats-in-side-by-side configuration enclosed cockpit under a bubble canopy, fixed tricycle landing gear and a single engine in tractor configuration. The cockpit is 120 cm (47 in) wide.

The aircraft is made from riveted and bonded aluminum sheet and is completely corrosion-treated after assembly. Its 9.6 m (31.5 ft) span wing has an area of 12.4 m^{2} (133 sq ft) and flaps. The standard engine available is the 100 hp (75 kW) Rotax 912ULS four-stroke powerplant.

== Variants ==
M-2 Scout LSA
Model for the US light-sport category with a gross weight of 600 kg (1,323 lb)
M-2 Scout UL
Model for the European ultralight category with a gross weight of 472.5 kg (1,042 lb)

== Specifications (M-2 Scout LSA) ==
Data from Bayerl and Kubicek Aircraft

General characteristics

- Crew: one
- Capacity: one passenger
- Length: 6.87 m (22 ft 6 in)
- Wingspan: 9.6 m (31 ft 6 in)
- Height: 2.35 m (7 ft 9 in)
- Wing area: 12.4 m^{2} (133 sq ft)
- Empty weight: 320 kg (705 lb)
- Gross weight: 600 kg (1,323 lb)
- Fuel capacity: 90 litres (20 imp gal; 24 US gal)
- Powerplant: 1 × Rotax 912ULS four cylinder, liquid and air-cooled, four stroke aircraft engine, 75 kW (101 hp)

Performance

- Maximum speed: 220 km/h (140 mph, 120 kn)
- Cruise speed: 180 km/h (110 mph, 97 kn)
- Stall speed: 72 km/h (45 mph, 39 kn) in the landing configuration
- Never exceed speed: 260 km/h (160 mph, 140 kn)
- Endurance: 6 hours
- g limits: +4/-2
- Rate of climb: 5 m/s (980 ft/min)
- Wing loading: 48.4 kg/m^{2} (9.9 lb/sq ft)
