= Beneš-Mráz =

- Industry: Aerospace
- Founded: April 1, 1935
- Founders: Pavel Beneš; Jaroslav Mráz
- Headquarters: Choceň, Czechoslovakia

inž. P. Beneš a inž. J. Mráz, továrna na letadla was a Czechoslovak aircraft manufacturer of the 1930s.

== History ==
Beneš-Mráz was established at Choceň by Pavel Beneš and Jaroslav Mráz on 1 Apr 1935 and manufactured a series of light aircraft of their own design until the Nazi-German occupation. In 1939/40, the company was renamed Ing. J. Mráz, továrna na letadla - Ing. J. Mráz, Flugzeugfabrik. During the war, the factory was used to produce Fieseler Fi 156 "Storch"s and DFS Kranich training gliders for the German Luftwaffe. Following the war, the company was reconstituted as Ing. J. Mráz, továrna na letadla, národní správa.

== Aircraft ==
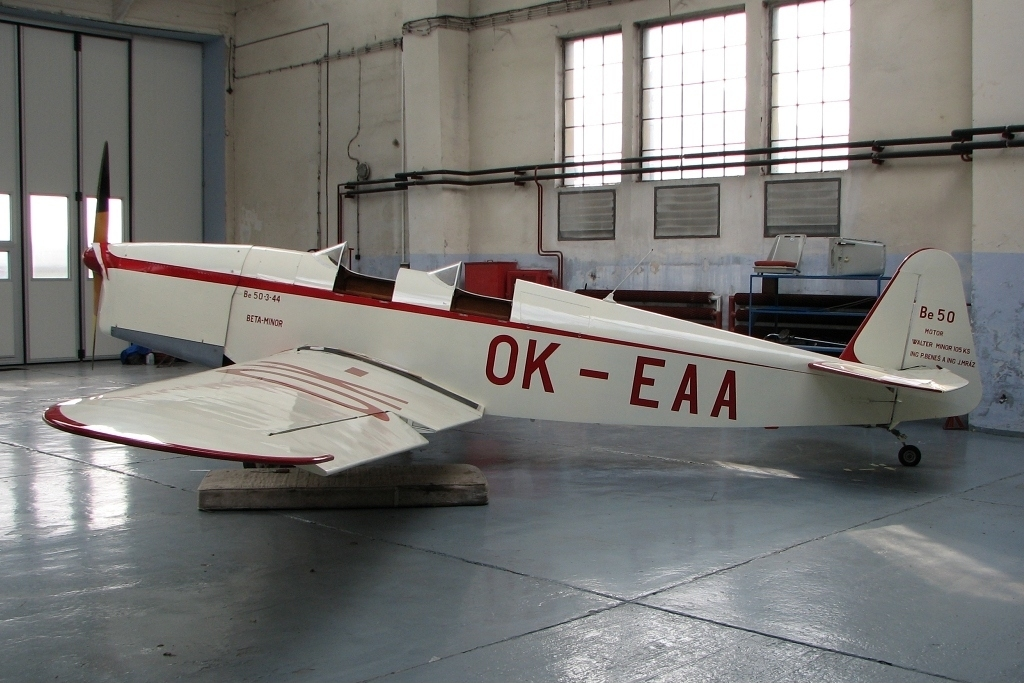
B-50 Beta Minor

Model name	First flight	Number built	Type
Beneš-Mráz Be-50 Beta-Minor	1935	43	Single engine sport airplane
Beneš-Mráz Be-51	1936	65	Single engine sport airplane
Beneš-Mráz Be-52 Beta-Major	1936	1	Single engine sport airplane; two-seat version of Be-56
Beneš-Mráz Be-53			
Beneš-Mráz Be-56 Beta-Major	1936	1	Single engine sport airplane
Beneš-Mráz Be-60 Bestiola	1935	23	Single engine utility airplane
Beneš-Mráz Be-150 Beta-Junior	1937	3	Single engine sport airplane
Beneš-Mráz Be-156			
Beneš-Mráz Be-250 Beta-Major	1936	1	Single engine sport airplane
Beneš-Mráz Be-251			Single engine sport airplane
Beneš-Mráz Be-252 Beta-Scolar	1937	1	Single engine sport airplane
Beneš-Mráz Be-352			
Beneš-Mráz Be-501	1936	1	Single engine touring airplane
Beneš-Mráz Be-502	1936	1	Single engine touring airplane
Beneš-Mráz Be-550 Bibi	1936	25	Single engine touring airplane
Beneš-Mráz Be-555 Super Bibi	1938	10	Single engine touring airplane
Mraz Kranich II			License built glider
Mraz DFS 230		14	License built assault glider
Mráz Zobor I	1942	10	Single engine touring airplane
Mráz K-65 Čáp		138	License built single engine liaison airplane
Mraz M-1 Sokol	1946	287	Single engine touring airplane
Mráz M-2 Skaut	1948	1	Single engine sport airplane
Mraz M-3 Bonzo	1948	1	Single engine utility airplane

== See also ==
- Aero Vodochody
- Avia
- Let Kunovice
- Letov Kbely
- Zlin Aircraft
