= RWD 11 =

RWD-11
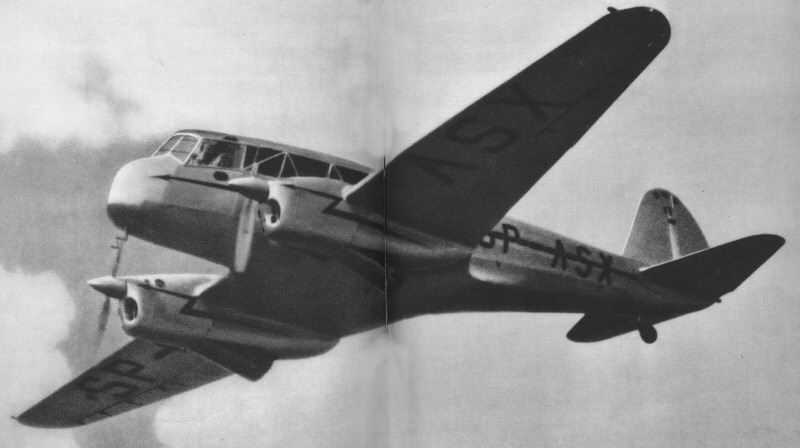
- RWD-11 in its initial shape

General information
- Type: Feederliner
- National origin: Poland
- Manufacturer: Doświadczalne Warsztaty Lotnicze
- Designer: Stanisław Rogalski, Jerzy Drzewiecki and Stanisław Wigura
- Number built: 1

History
- First flight: February 1936

The RWD-11 was a six-passenger feeder-liner designed and built in Poland from 1932.

== Development ==
In 1932 the Polish ministry of Transport let it be known that they wanted a multi-engined feeder-liner to operate low frequency routes with challenging. Designer Zbysław Ciołkosz was given the task and his design resulted in the PZL.27. In addition to Ciołkosz's design DWL (Doświadczalne Warsztaty Lotnicze) started the design of a competitor, with support promised by the Ministry, hoping that their design would be superior and win orders in place of the officially sanctioned PZL.27.

Two airframes were built, with one intended for static testing, the low-wing cantilever monoplane was of mixed construction with a one-piece two-spar wooden wing, tapering in chord and thickness, covered with plywood forward of the mainspar and the under sides with fabric covering the rest. Four section Handley-Page automatic slats were fitted to the entire leading edges out board of the engine nacelles and differential slotted ailerons at the trailing edges.

The fuselage of the RWD-11 comprised a welded chrome-molybdenum-steel tubing structure, covered with plywood from the nose, aft to the cabin door, with fabric aft of the door to the fabric covered wooden tail-section. The cockpit had excellent visibility for the two pilots who sat side by side forward of the comfortable passenger compartment which seated six in three pairs on adjustable seats, with electric lighting, controlled ventilation and controlled heating from heat exchangers on the engine exhausts. The cabin had a cargo compartment aft of the seats and could be converted to all freight or postal duties. Two retractable main undercarriage legs were fitted with oleo-pneumatic shock-absorbers, medium pressure braked Dunlop wheels, as well as the non-retractable castoring Dowty tailwheel. Provision for fitting a retractable tailwheel undercarriage was also provided.

Two 220–250 hp (160–190 kW) engines were intended to be fitted to the welded steel tube engine nacelles but the prototype was fitted with two 205 hp (153 kW) Walter Major 6 engines, with instruments fitted to the inner sides of the nacelles where they were clearly visible to the flight crew. Two fuel tanks of 140 L (37 US gal; 31 imp gal) each were housed in the wings with oil tanks in the engine nacelles.

Flight trials were relatively successful but no orders were forthcoming, meanwhile several improvements were carried out to the nose, which was elongated, and at a later stage a twin tail was fitted in lieu of the original single tail. During flight trials it was noticed that the RWD-11 was prone to wing flutter which built up gradually as speed increased, giving plenty of warning, so the RWD 11 was fitted with a rudimentary vibration recorder using a modified phonograph recorder, for research into flutter. At the time of the German invasion of Poland in September 1939 the RWD-11 was in use as an executive aircraft for the company, but suffered a collapsed undercarriage during taxiing, being left behind for capture by German forces. The RWD-11 was sent to Germany and was seen later near Berlin in German markings but did not survive World War II.

== Specifications (RWD-11 modified nose) ==

Data from Polish Aircraft 1893–1939, Jane's all the World's Aircraft 1937, Polskie konstrukcje lotnicze 1893-1939

General characteristics

- Crew: 2 (pilot with flight engineer/radio operator)
- Capacity: 6
- Length: 10.12 m (33 ft 2 in)
- Wingspan: 15.2 m (49 ft 10 in)
- Height: 3 m (9 ft 10 in)
- Wing area: 25 m^{2} (270 sq ft)
- Empty weight: 1,740 kg (3,836 lb)
- Gross weight: 2,650 kg (5,842 lb)
- Fuel capacity: 280 L (74 US gal; 62 imp gal)
- Powerplant: 2 × Walter Major 6 6-cyl air-cooled inverted in-line piston engines, 150 kW (200 hp) each
- Propellers: 2-bladed metal propellers

Performance

- Maximum speed: 300 km/h (190 mph, 160 kn) at sea level
- Landing speed: 88 km/h (55 mph; 48 kn)
- Cruise speed: 255 km/h (158 mph, 138 kn)
- Minimum control speed: 215 km/h (134 mph, 116 kn)
- Range: 800 km (500 mi, 430 nmi)
- Service ceiling: 4,100 m (13,500 ft) service ceiling
- Single engine ceiling: 1,200 m (3,900 ft)
- Rate of climb: 3.33 m/s (656 ft/min)
- Time to altitude: 1,000 m (3,300 ft) in 5 minutes
- Wing loading: 106 kg/m^{2} (22 lb/sq ft)
- Power/mass: 0.1149 kW/kg (0.0699 hp/lb)

== See also ==
Related development

- RWD-22

Aircraft of comparable role, configuration, and era

- Airspeed Consul
- General Aircraft Monospar ST-25
