= PWS-35 Ogar =

PWS-35
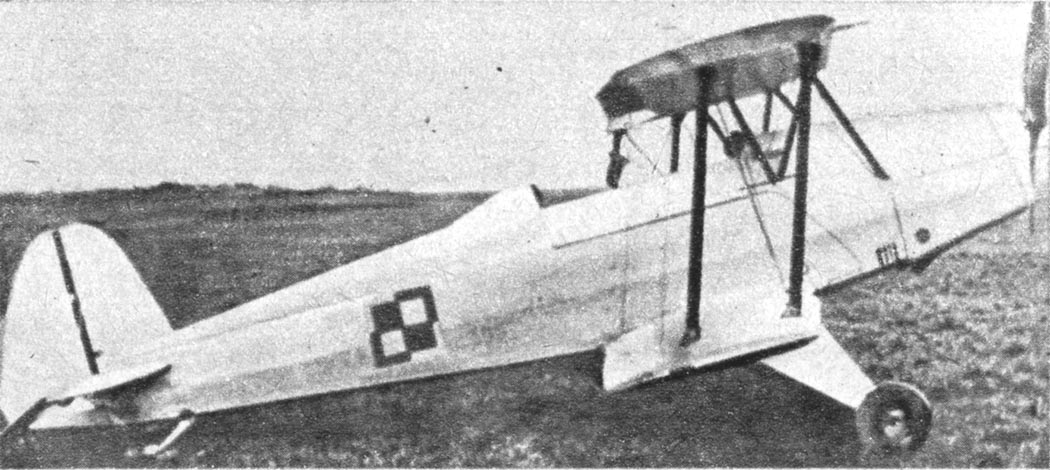
- PWS-35

General information
- Type: Aerobatic trainer aircraft
- National origin: Poland
- Manufacturer: Podlaska Wytwórnia Samolotów
- Number built: 2 prototypes (+17 incomplete)

History
- First flight: July 1938

The PWS-35 Ogar (English: Polish Hound) was a two-seat, aerobatic training biplane that was designed by Kazimierz Nowicki, Marian Piątka and Michał Rosnowski at the Politechnika Lwowska in 1935/1936.

== Design and development ==
The aircraft was designed by three young scientists at the Lvov University of Technology ("Polytechnic") as their thesis. The designers initially planned to build a single aircraft (designated as the NPR-1, after the initials of the design team's members), but in 1937 the Podlaska Wytwórnia Samolotów became interested in their design and hired professional designers to modify it to fit the needs of the Polish Air Force. At the time the PAF was looking for an advanced trainer and it was decided that Ogar would be perfect for that role.

The prototype was completed in 1937 and in early 1938 underwent static tests. In the summer of 1938 it was successfully test-flown by S. Szubka. The first prototype, equipped with a de Havilland Gipsy Major engine, was heavier than anticipated and as a result the aircraft had poor stall characteristics and stability issues. By the end of the summer a second prototype, with an enlarged vertical stabilizer and a stronger PZInż. Major engine was completed and sent to the Institute of Aviation in Warsaw for further tests. Michał Rosnowski designed further modifications and the aircraft was scheduled to enter serial production in late 1938, however, numerous problems with handling and weight and balance postponed the start of serial production until late 1939. Out of the initial order of 150, 50 were finally ordered in the summer of 1939. Out of the first batch of 17 airframes started in July 1939, none were delivered to the Polish Air Force by the invasion of Poland. The first prototype was provided to the air force but was destroyed near Lubartów shortly afterwards. The other prototype was destroyed in an air raid on Warsaw's Okęcie Airport.

The aircraft was powered by a four-cylinder PZInż. Major 4 engine, with 120 hp (89 kW).

== Variants ==
PWS-35/I
First prototype.
PWS-35/II
Second prototype.

== Specifications (PWS-35/II) ==
General characteristics

- Crew: 2
- Capacity: 250kg
- Length: 6.8 m (22 ft 4 in)
- Wingspan: 8 m (26 ft 3 in)
- Height: 2.5 m (8 ft 2 in)
- Wing area: 17 m^{2} (180 sq ft)
- Empty weight: 610 kg (1,345 lb)
- Max takeoff weight: 860 kg (1,896 lb)
- Powerplant: 1 × PZInż. Major 4 4-cylinder inverted inline, 89 kW (120 hp)

Performance

- Maximum speed: 200 km/h (120 mph, 110 kn)
- Cruise speed: 170 km/h (110 mph, 92 kn)
- Stall speed: 80 km/h (50 mph, 43 kn)
- Range: 550 km (340 mi, 300 nmi)
- Service ceiling: 3,500 m (11,500 ft)
- Rate of climb: 3 m/s (590 ft/min)
- Wing loading: 50.59 kg/m^{2} (10.36 lb/sq ft)
