= Mráz Skaut =

1940s Czechoslovak light aircraft

M-2 Skaut
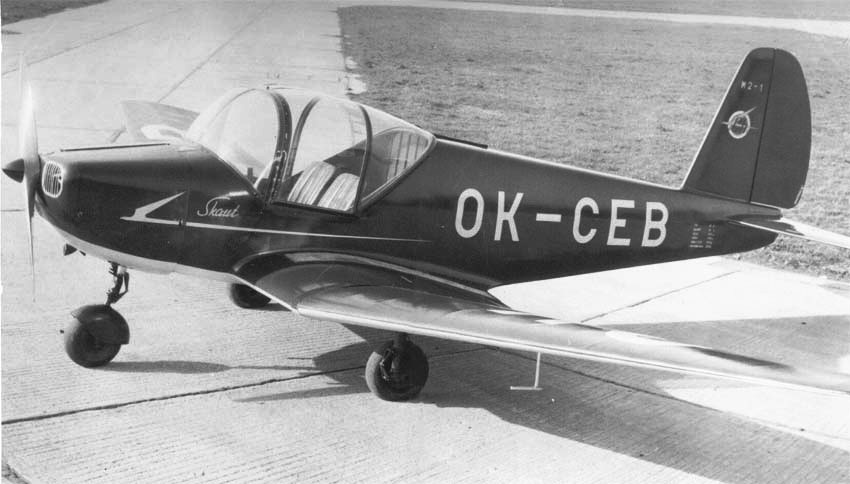

General information
- Type: Sports plane
- Manufacturer: Beneš-Mráz, Choceň
- Designer: Zdeněk Rublič
- Number built: 1 prototype in 1948, 1 in 2009.

History
- First flight: mid-1948
- Variant: Kubicek M-2 Scout

The Mráz M-2 Skaut was a Czechoslovak wooden two-seat, single engine, low wing sports aircraft of the late 1940s. In 2005 the design was revisited, resulting in the metal framed, modernised Scout which first flew in 2009 with plans for production and first deliveries in 2011.

== Design and development ==
The Czechoslovak aircraft factory Mráz introduced several new sport aircraft after World War II. One of them was the M-2 Skaut, designed by Zdeněk Rublič, who later designed the Aero L-29 Delfín trainer jet. His aim was to design an easily flyable and reliable aircraft for basic club pilot training, with moderate operating costs and requiring little maintenance. To simplify production, the wing and tail from his earlier, successful M-1C Sokol design was used. The prototype, first flown in mid-1948, showed that the Skaut was a stable and safe aircraft, pleasantly controllable and with a good field of view. These characteristics together with a side-by-side cockpit and a tricycle landing gear made it a promising civil trainer aircraft. However, the new communist government nationalised the Mráz factory and directed it to produce military aircraft, so only the prototype Skaut was completed in the 20th century.

Like the Sokol, the Skaut was a wood framed, fabric covered aircraft. Their shared straight tapered wing had a swept leading edge but no sweep on the trailing edge They had marked dihedral beyond a very short centre section. The fin also had a swept leading edge and carried a rounded rudder. The tailplane was set well to the rear and near the top of the fuselage with a single piece elevator; the rudder moved above it. The Skaut had fixed tricycle landing gear.

In 2005 Petr Kubiček, encouraged by aerospace engineering students at Brno University, began to design a modernised Skaut with the hope of production. The first Kubicek M-2 Scout (the name was Anglicised) of the 21st century appeared, unflown, at Aero '09 held in Friedrichshafen in the spring of 2009 and flew for the first time on 7 May 2009. The Scout design began with the original plans reassessed with modern methods and using a metal rather than wood structure, supplemented with some composite materials for the engines cowling and flying surface tips. Two versions are being developed, one to meet the US Light Sport requirement with a maximum take-off weight (MTOW) of 598 kg (1,320 lb) and a second for the European Ultralight MTOW limit of 450 kg (992 lb). Both these MTOWs are less than that of the original Skaut and empty weight are also less. Certification was proceeding in 2010, with the aim of first deliveries during 2011.

Externally the old and new aircraft are similar, wings and tail having the same features and the side-by-side seating retained. Electrically operated flaps are fitted to the Scout and there is a central trim tab on the elevator. Its fixed tricycle undercarriage is mounted on the fuselage with cantilever composite mainlegs. The mainwheels have brakes operated with a central lever and the nosewheel has helical springing. All wheels are spatted. It is powered by a 73.5 kW (98.6 hp) Rotax 912ULS flat four air- and water- cooled piston engine, driving a three blade propeller with ground adjustable blade pitch. The higher engine power and lighter weight gives the Scout UL a much improved rate climb of 5.0 m/s (984 ft/min) over the Skaut's 3.5 m/s (689 ft/min) and the Scout LSA climbs faster still. (6.0 m/s or 1.181 ft/min). Wing tanks give a fuel capacity of 90 L (23.5 US gal; 19.8 Imp gal).

== Operational history ==
The only wooden prototype Skaut, OK-CEB Svazák, served at several flying clubs, mostly in Vrchlabí, and became very popular. There are rumours that it was flown solo by glider pilots without any previous experience of powered aircraft. In the early 1960s it was damaged during an emergency landing after an engine failure and was scrapped.

After its first flight in the early summer of 2009, the Scout prototype appeared at several Czech airshows and fly-ins.

== Specifications (Skaut) ==
Data from Jane's All The World's Aircraft 1951–52

General characteristics

- Crew: 2
- Length: 6.75 m (22 ft 2 in)
- Wingspan: 10 m (32 ft 10 in)
- Height: 1.9 m (6 ft 3 in)
- Wing area: 13.8 m^{2} (149 sq ft)
- Empty weight: 370 kg (816 lb)
- Gross weight: 660 kg (1,455 lb)
- Fuel capacity: 70 L (18 US gal; 15 imp gal)
- Powerplant: 1 × Praga D air-cooled horizontally-opposed engine, 56 kW (75 hp)
- Propellers: 2-bladed fixed pitch

Performance

- Maximum speed: 185 km/h (115 mph, 100 kn)
- Cruise speed: 150 km/h (93 mph, 81 kn)
- Range: 700 km (430 mi, 380 nmi)
- Service ceiling: 4,200 m (13,800 ft)
- Rate of climb: 2.7 m/s (530 ft/min)

== See also ==
Aircraft of comparable role, configuration, and era

- Zlín Z-22 Junák

Related lists

- List of civil aircraft
