= Mráz Sokol =

1940s Czechoslovak light aircraft

M-1 Sokol
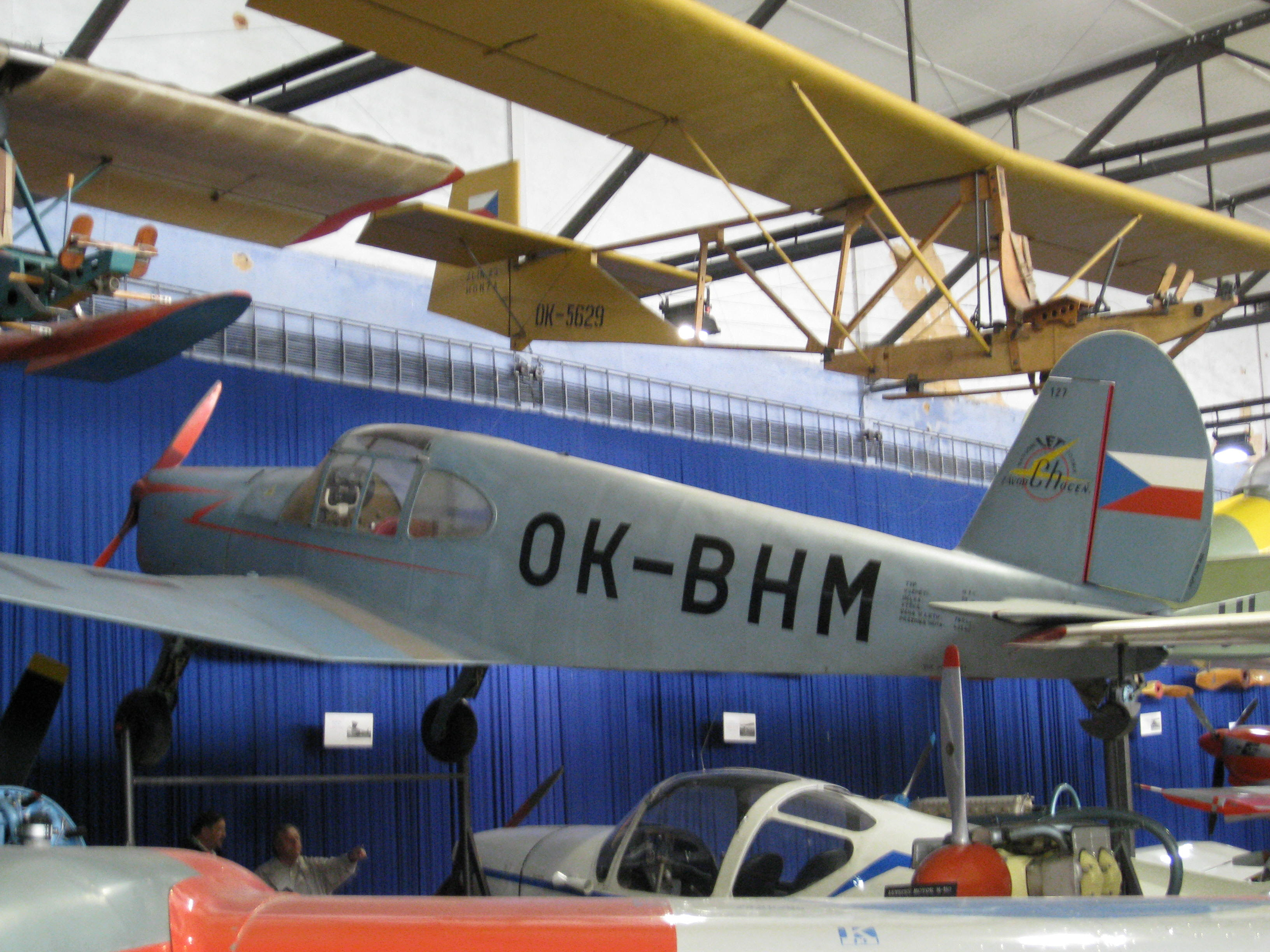
- M-1C in the Prague Aviation Museum, Kbely

General information
- Type: Utility aircraft
- National origin: Czechoslovakia
- Manufacturer: Beneš-Mráz, Choceň
- Designer: Zdeněk Rublič
- Number built: 287

History
- First flight: 9 March 1946

The Mráz M.1 Sokol (English: "Falcon") was a light aircraft built in Czechoslovakia in the years following the end of the Second World War. Designed in secret by Zdeněk Rublič at the Beneš-Mráz factory during the German occupation, the type was put into production in 1946.

== Design and development ==
The Sokol was a conventional, low-wing monoplane that took the pre-war Beneš-Mráz Bibi as its starting point. Two seats were provided side-by-side in an enclosed cabin, and the main units of the tailwheel undercarriage were retractable. Construction throughout was of wood.

The prototype, designated the M.1/1 and registered as OK-ZHA, first flew on 9 March 1946. After testing, the prototype was redesignated the M.1A, as the type entered production. A re-engined two-seater was built designated the M.1B with a 105 hp (78 kW) ZLAS Toma 4 engine, flying for the first time on 19 May 1946 but no more M.1Bs were built. Instead, the M.1A was modified by adding a third seat in the rear, becoming the M.1C and first flying on 16 February 1947. The M.1C became the main production variant with 183 aircraft built.

In 1948 the M.1C was further developed as the M.1D with an enlarged single-piece canopy and a revised rudder. The M.1D first flew on 4 October 1948 and 104 were built. One M.1D was fitted with locally produced floats and re-designated the M.1E, it first flew in September 1949. A minor variant was the Para-Sokol which was fitted with rearward sliding canopy to allow parachutists to leave the aircraft.

Around 287 aircraft were built but the deterioration of the Urea-based glue used caused many examples to be condemned in the early 1960s and withdrawn from use. Nineteen Sokols were recorded as still being registered in 2013 with only a few still flyable.

== Variants ==
- M-1A – original two-seat version with Walter Minor engine
- M-1B – similar to M-1A but with ZLAS Toma 4 engine (1 built)
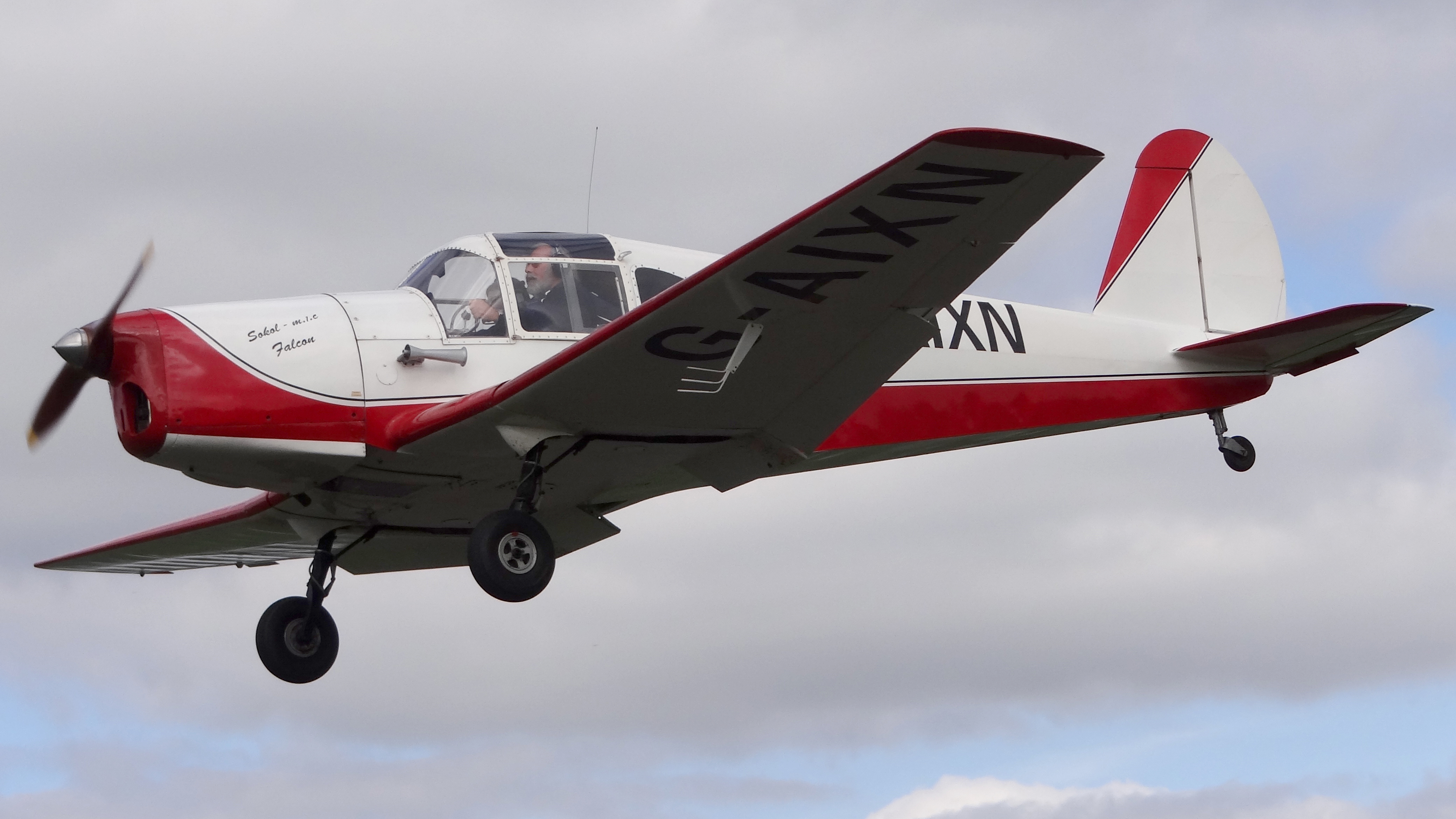
- G-AIXN landing at its home base of Turweston Aerodrome in the United Kingdom in 2017
  M-1C – revised version, with longer fuselage and third seat, and swept leading edges on wing (183 built)
- M-1D – similar to M-1C with new, single-piece canopy and larger rear windows (104 built)
- M-1E – similar to M-1D but equipped with pontoons (at least 1 built)

== Operators ==
Czechoslovakia

- Czechoslovak National Security Guard

Egypt

- Egyptian Air Force

== Surviving aircraft ==
An M-1C, registration G-AIXN is maintained in flyable condition in the UK and is based at Turweston Aerodrome Other airworthy examples exist in the Czech Republic at Prague Točná Airport (2016) and in Germany (2012).

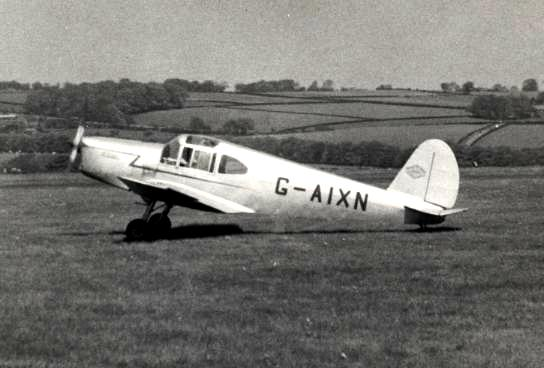
M1C Sokol G-AIXN at Leeds (Yeadon) in 1954, and is still airworthy in 2021

- M.1C OK-AHN is on display at the National Technical Museum, Prague, Czech Republic.
- M.1C OK-BHM is on display at the Prague Aviation Museum, Kbely, Czech Republic
- M.1C HA-REA is on display at the Hungarian Technical and Transportation Museum, Budapest, Hungary.
- M.1C 03 is on display at the Beijing Air and Space Museum (previously known as Beijing Aviation Museum), Beijing, China.
- M.1C 04 is on display at the Chinese Aviation Museum, Datangshan, China

== Specifications (M-1D) ==
Data from Jane's All The World's Aircraft 1951–52

General characteristics

- Crew: 1
- Capacity: 2 passengers
- Length: 7.35 m (24 ft 1 in)
- Wingspan: 10.0 m (32 ft 10 in)
- Height: 2.20 m (7 ft 3 in) (tail up)
- Wing area: 13.8 m^{2} (149 sq ft)
- Empty weight: 425 kg (937 lb)
- Gross weight: 780 kg (1,720 lb)
- Powerplant: 1 × Walter Minor 4-III air-cooled four-cylinder inverted inline engine, 78 kW (105 hp)

Performance

- Maximum speed: 240 km/h (150 mph, 130 kn)
- Cruise speed: 212 km/h (132 mph, 114 kn)
- Range: 1,000 km (620 mi, 540 nmi)
- Service ceiling: 4,800 m (15,700 ft)
- Rate of climb: 3.0 m/s (590 ft/min)

== See also ==
Related development

- Beneš-Mráz Bibi
