= Beneš-Mráz Be-50 Beta-Minor =

Be-50 Beta-Minor
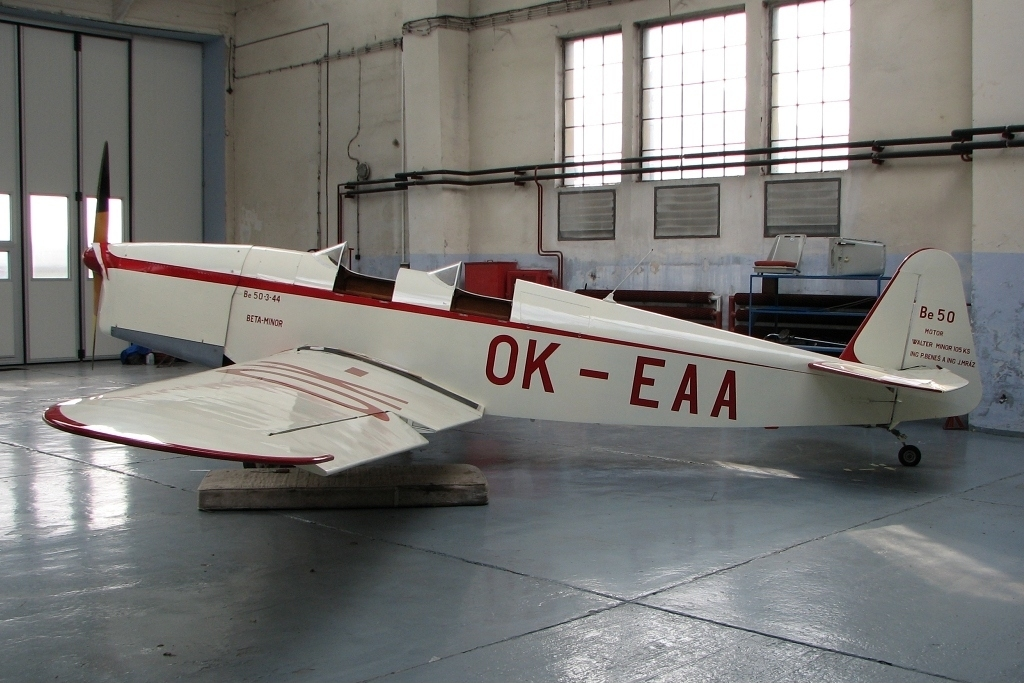
- Be-50 Beta-Minor

General information
- Type: Sports plane
- Manufacturer: Beneš-Mráz
- Designer: Pavel Beneš and Jaroslav Mráz

History
- First flight: 1935

The Beneš-Mráz Be-50 Beta-Minor was a light airplane manufactured in Czechoslovakia shortly before World War II.

== Design and development ==
First flown in 1935, it was a low-wing cantilever monoplane of wooden construction, with tandem open cockpits and fixed tailwheel undercarriage. The aircraft proved popular with Czechoslovakia's aeroclubs and was successful in international competitions. In 1937, the designers created a modernised version, the Be-51, which featured a reduced wingspan and fully enclosed cockpits. A final variant, the Be-52 Beta-Major retained the Be-50's open cockpits but featured improved aerodynamics and a more powerful Walter Major engine.

== Operational history ==
Like other Czechoslovak aircraft, all available machines were impressed into Air Force service at the outbreak of war. Several Be-51s survived to be used by the Luftwaffe as liaison aircraft and trainers during the occupation.

In 2015, replica of Be-50 started operating. It crashed at airshow in August 2018, killing its pilot.

== Variants ==
Be-50 Beta-Minor
Tandem open cockpits and 12.66 m (41.5 ft) span wings.
Be-51 Beta-Minor
tandem seats in an enclosed cabin and 11.44 m (37.5 ft) span wings.
Be-52 Beta-Major
Strengthened and more powerful two-seat aerobatic trainer, with 10.66 m (35.0 ft) span wings.
Be-56 Beta-Major
Strengthened and more powerful single-seat aerobatic trainer, with 10.66 m (35.0 ft) span wings.

== Operators ==
Independent State of Croatia

- Air Force of the Independent State of Croatia

Germany

- Luftwaffe

Slovakia

- Slovak Air Force (1939–1945)

== Specifications (Be-51 Beta-Minor) ==
Data from

General characteristics

- Crew: 2
- Length: 7.76 m (25 ft 6 in)
- Wingspan: 11.44 m (37 ft 6 in)
- Height: 2.05 m (6 ft 9 in)
- Wing area: 15.3 m^{2} (165 sq ft)
- Empty weight: 480 kg (1,058 lb)
- Max takeoff weight: 760 kg (1,676 lb)
- Powerplant: 1 × Walter Minor 4-cyl. inverted air-cooled in-line piston engine, 71 kW (95 hp) for take-off
- Propellers: 2-bladed fixed pitch propeller

Performance

- Maximum speed: 205 km/h (127 mph, 111 kn) at sea level
- Cruise speed: 180 km/h (110 mph, 97 kn)
- Range: 800 km (500 mi, 430 nmi)
- Service ceiling: 5,000 m (16,000 ft)
- Time to altitude: 1,000 m (3,300 ft) in 6 minutes
