= Nieuport-Delage NiD 450 =

NiD 450

General information
- Type: Schneider Trophy racing aircraft
- National origin: France
- Manufacturer: Nieuport-Asra
- Designer: Charles Pilon and Eugène Tracy
- Number built: 3

History
- First flight: April–May 1930

The Nieuport-Delage NiD 450 was a French racing floatplane, originally intended to compete for the 1929 Schneider Trophy. After the French decided not to participate that year, the type was used as the NiD 650 to speed the development of the proposed entrants to the 1931 event, the NiD 651 and NiD 652. Delays in producing the latters' engines left these unflown.

== Design and development ==
In the summer of 1928 the French government contracted Nieuport-Astra and Société des Avions Bernard to produce racing seaplanes to compete in the 1929 Schneider Trophy. The resulting aircraft were the Bernard H.V.40 and the NiD 450. Design work on the latter was led by Charles Pilon, assisted by Eugène Tracy. Construction of three airframes, two for flight and one for structural tests, began together after wind tunnel and hydrodynamic tests were concluded.

The NiD 450 was a low cantilever wing aircraft. The wing, built around two duralumin spars and with a thin profile, was trapezoidal in plan out to rounded tips, with sweep only on the leading edges. Much of the wing surface was formed by thin, smooth radiators for the liquid-cooled engine; the rest was wood-covered with spruce leading edges.

Its engine was a 890 kW (1,200 hp) Hispano-Suiza 18R, a W18 engine with three cylinder banks separated by 80°, each individually tightly cowled. The cockpit was well behind the wing trailing edge where the upper engine bank cowling merged, unbroken in line, into the upper fuselage, so the pilot had little forward vision. Structurally the fuselage was a light metal-covered monocoque. The fin had Nieuport's characteristic elliptical profile and the horizontal tail, set low on the fuselage, was a broad oval in plan.

The NiD 450's floats, designed by Bonnemaison, were 6 m (19 ft 8 in) long and of the single step type. Each was attached to the fuselage centre-line by a pair of wide-chord, faired, steel struts and contained a 195 L (43 imp gal; 52 US gal) fuel, enabling 45 min of flight.

In August 1929, following a dispute with the Trophy organizers, France decided to pull out of the contest but the aircraft development programme continued; delayed by engine problems it was not until February 1930 that flight trials, piloted by Sadi Lecointe, began. On 10 April long runs on the water at Hourtin were made. The exact date of the first flight is not known but had occurred by 1 June when, during a high speed run, a section of cowling came adrift. The aircraft sustained damage which took it back to the factory for several more months.

It was recognised that the Hispano-Suiza engine was not competitive with the 1,400 kW (1,900 hp) Rolls-Royce R, so French designs with more powerful but untested engines were planned. These included the Nieuport-Delage NiD 651 and NiD 652, so Nieuport continued to develop the second NiD 450 as the NiD 650. Modifications to it were based on the lessons of the earlier tests; externally, the principal alteration was a much larger aperture in the nose to assist engine cooling. A three-bladed Levasseur propeller was probably used for the first flight on 12 March. Only four more flights had been made by the end of April, with the NiD 650 reluctant to take-off, so new floats of greater area and with two steps were tried. Strong propeller torque made it hard to keep on line at take-off so the fin was modified and the floats fuelled asymmetrically. More unsuccessful take-off tests followed; on 22 July the NiD 650, just leaving the water, crashed at high speed. Pilot and engineer survived and the airframe was recovered, but with its wings and floats badly damaged.

A second NiD 650 was built, probably using the airframe of the first NiD 450, incorporating the modifications made to the first NiD 650 and also a new, geared-down Hispano-Suiza 18R which produced 890 kW (1,200 hp). It first flew on 31 August, fitted with a larger fin but was soon abandoned, having missed the deadline for the 1931 Schneider Trophy.

The NiD 651 and NiD 652, respectively powered by a Lorraine 12 Rcr, 1,500 kW (2,000 hp) and a Renault 12 Ncr, 1,500 kW (2,000 hp) liquid-cooled V-12 engines, and with dimensions similar to those of the NiD 450 were the original French hopes for the 1931 Schneider Trophy. Neither engine was ready in time; the NiD 651 was complete but engineless and the NiD 652 airframe unfinished.

== Variants ==
NiD 450
Two built, plus one airframe for structural testing. Hispano-Suiza 18R, 890 kW (1,200 hp) engine.
NiD 650
Two built, first powered as NiD 450 and second, probably built from the second NiD 450 airframe, with geared Hispano-Suiza 18R, 1,250 kW (1,680 hp).
NiD 651
Airframe completed but without engine. Lorraine 12Rcr Radium, 1,500 kW (2,000 hp).
NiD 652
Airframe incomplete. Renault 12Ncr, 1,500 kW (2,000 hp).

== Specifications ==
Data from Nieuport 1909-1950, p.234

General characteristics

- Crew: One
- Length: 7.45 m (24 ft 5 in)
- Wingspan: 9.7 m (31 ft 10 in)
- Height: 2.82 m (9 ft 3 in)
- Wing area: 15.46 m^{2} (166.4 sq ft)
- Empty weight: 1,441 kg (3,177 lb)
- Gross weight: 1,721 kg (3,794 lb)
- Powerplant: 1 × Hispano-Suiza 18R liquid cooled, W18, 890 kW (1,200 hp)
- Propellers: 2-bladed

Performance

- Maximum speed: 560 km/h (350 mph, 300 kn)
- Range: 380 km (240 mi, 210 nmi)
