= Nakajima A6M2-N =

Japanese floatplane fighter

A6M2-N
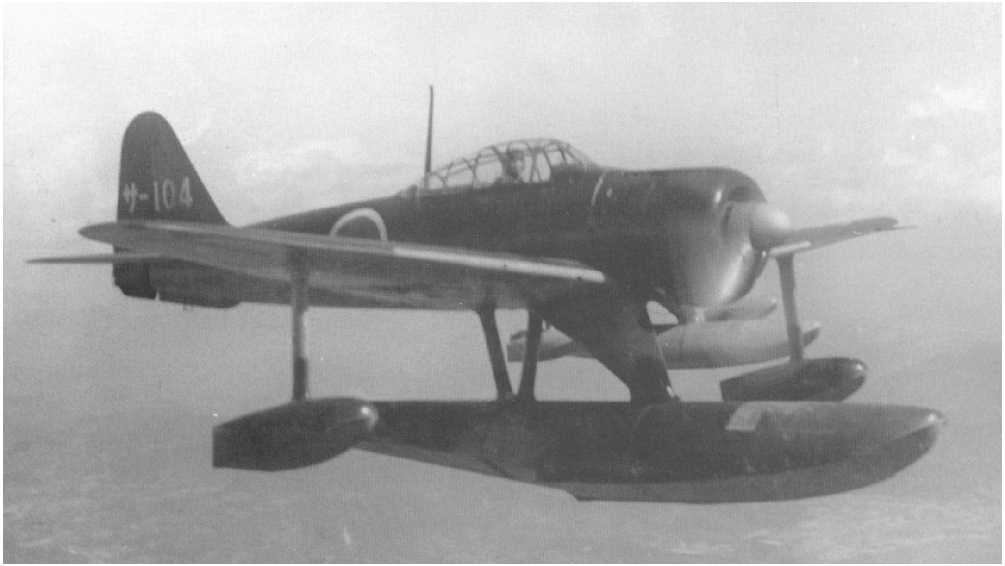
- A6M2-N

General information
- Type: Interceptor/fighter-bomber floatplane
- National origin: Japan
- Manufacturer: Nakajima Aircraft Company
- Primary user: Imperial Japanese Navy
- Number built: 327

History
- Introduction date: 1942
- First flight: 7 December 1941
- Developed from: Mitsubishi A6M Zero

The Nakajima A6M2-N (Navy Type 2 Interceptor/Fighter-Bomber) was a single-crew floatplane based on the Mitsubishi A6M Zero Model 11. The Allied reporting name for the aircraft was Rufe.

== Design and development ==
While waiting on the completion of the Kawanishi N1K, Nakajima was chosen by the Imperial Japanese Navy to provide an interim floatplane, which they did by modifying Mitsubishi's A6M-2 Model 11. Mitsubishi was not offered the contract as they were already overburdened. Nakajima proposed that they could churn out 900 aircraft in under a year. The design of the plane itself wasn't much different than the A6M-2 it was based on. The retractable, wheeled undercarriage was removed and plated over. This was replaced by a large central float and one cantilever stablizer float under each wing. The tail was straightened out and the under fuselage received a type of two-section "keel" designed to counteract movement by the central float. The engine, cockpit, and armament remained stock. The first prototype of the A6M2-N flew on 7 December 1941, ten months after the initial request, and an order for 500 units was placed. Despite their boasts about production capability, Nakajima was unable to deliver more than 327 aircraft, including the prototype.

== Operational history ==
The aircraft, referred to as the "Suisen 2" ("Hydro fighter type 2"), was deployed in 1942 in both the Aleutians and Solomon Islands operations. On 7 August 1942, almost all of the Rufes in the Solomons were destroyed by a raid made up of 15 Grumman F4F Wildcats launched from the USS Wasp. The A6M2-N proved its worth in the Aleutians at Kiska, where they weren't hampered by the lack of airfields and allowed land-based fighters in the Kuril Islands to be freed up for tasks elsewhere.

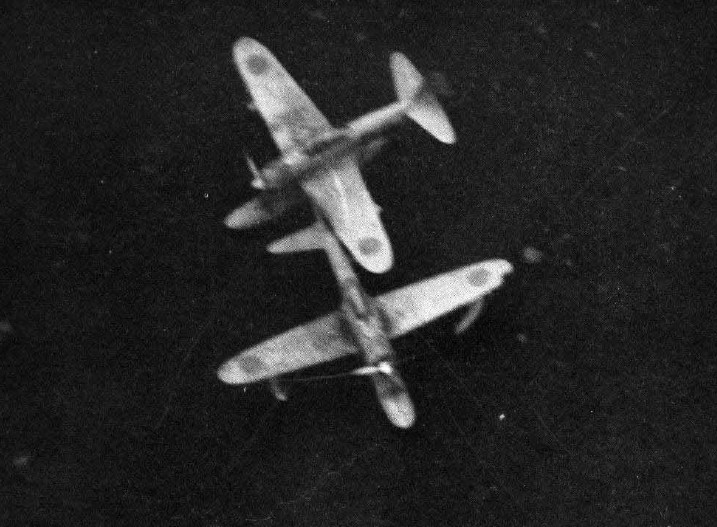
A6M2-Ns at Holtz Bay in Attu Island, Alaska

The seaplane also served as an interceptor for protecting fueling depots in Balikpapan and Avon Bases (Dutch East Indies), and they reinforced the Shumushu base (North Kuriles) in the same period. Such fighters served aboard seaplane carriers Kamikawa Maru in the Solomons and Kuriles areas and aboard Japanese raiders Hokoku Maru and Aikoku Maru in Indian Ocean raids. Later in the conflict, the Otsu Air Group utilized the A6M2-N as an interceptor alongside Kawanishi N1K1 Kyofu ("Rex") aircraft based in Biwa lake in the Honshū area, suffering heavy losses. By this time it was already well-known that the Rufe simply could not compete against modern fighter designs, so production ceased in September 1943.

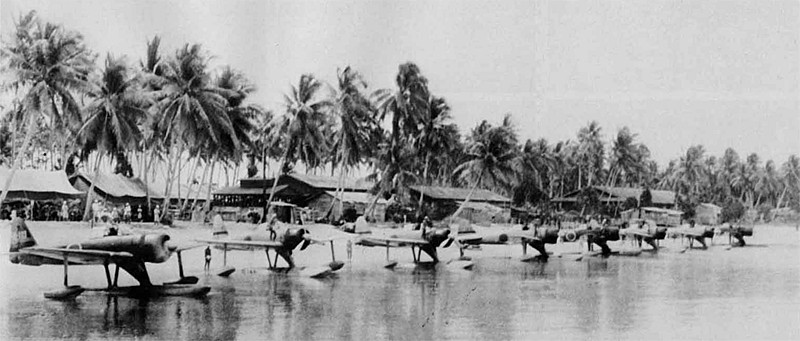
A6M2-Ns lined up along a beach.

The last A6M2-N in military service was a single example recovered by the French forces in Indochina after the end of World War II. It crashed shortly after being overhauled.

== Operators ==
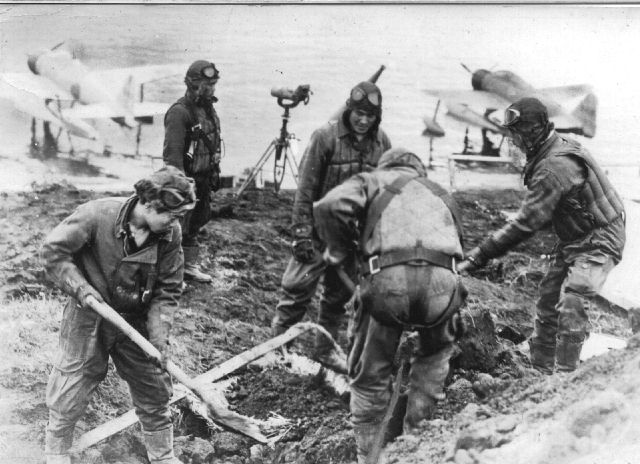
Japanese pilots at an A6M2-N plane anchorage. Two Rufe planes are visible in the background.

Japan

- Imperial Japanese Navy Air Service
  - Yokohama Air Group
  - Toko Air Group
  - Otsu Air Group
  - Yokosuka Naval Air Group (technical evaluation unit)
  - 11th Air Fleet
  - 5th Air Fleet
  - 36th Air Fleet
  - 452nd Air Fleet
  - 934th Air Fleet

France

- French Navy - Postwar, one Nakajima A6M-2N was captured in Indo-China, and after an overhaul was placed in service with the French Navy in late 1945, crashing shortly afterwards.

== Specifications (Nakajima A6M2-N) ==
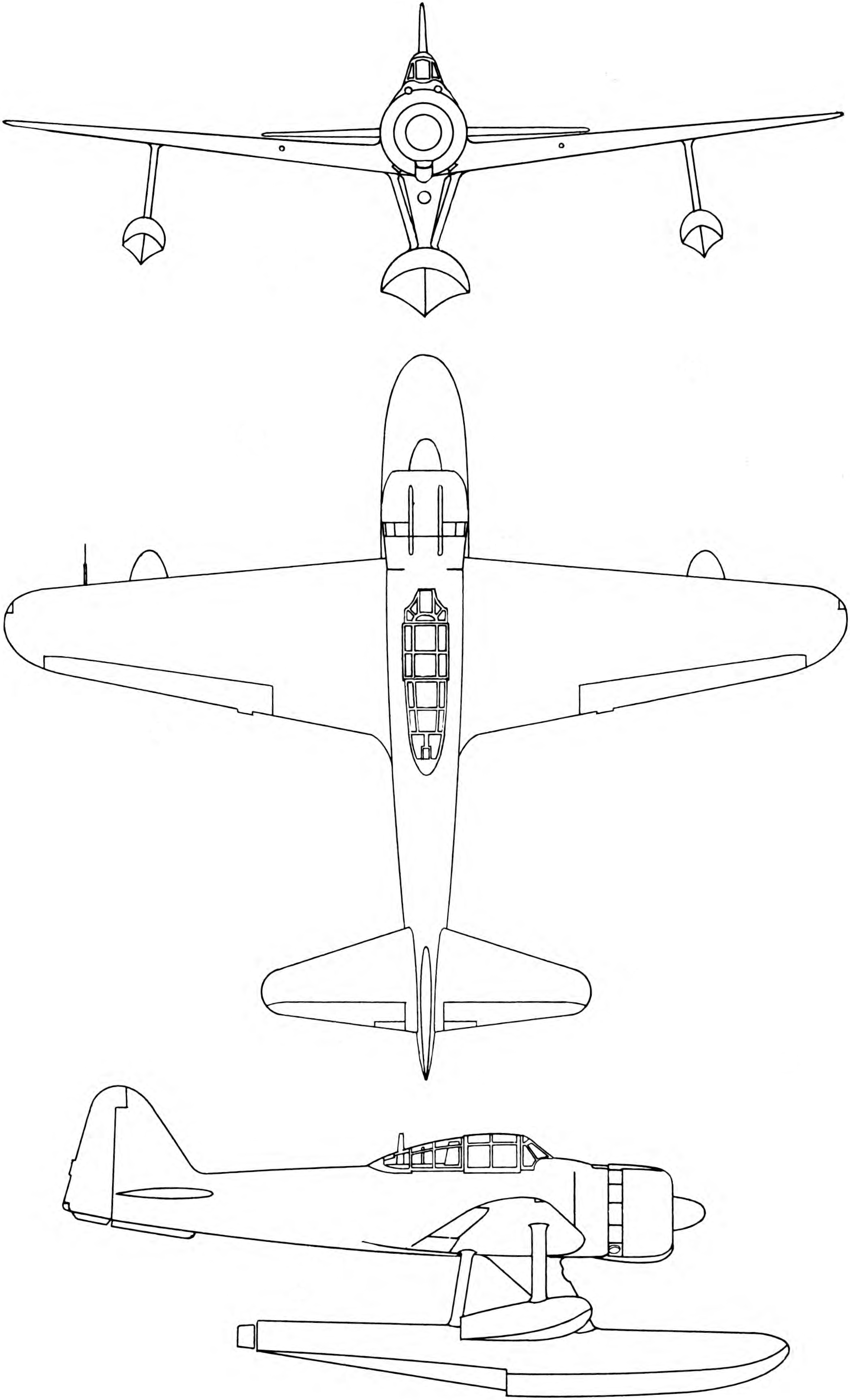
3-view drawing of the Nakajima A6M2-N

Data from Japanese Aircraft of the Pacific War

General characteristics

- Crew: 1
- Length: 10.1 m (33 ft 2 in)
- Wingspan: 12 m (39 ft 4 in)
- Height: 4.3 m (14 ft 1 in)
- Wing area: 22.44 m^{2} (241.5 sq ft)
- Empty weight: 1,912 kg (4,215 lb)
- Gross weight: 2,460 kg (5,423 lb)
- Max takeoff weight: 2,880 kg (6,349 lb)
- Powerplant: 1 × Nakajima NK1C Sakae 12 14-cylinder air-cooled radial piston engine, 700 kW (940 hp) for take-off

950 hp (710 kW) at 4,200 m (13,800 ft)

- Propellers: 3-bladed constant-speed metal propeller

Performance

- Maximum speed: 435 km/h (270 mph, 235 kn) at 5,000 m (16,000 ft)
- Cruise speed: 296 km/h (184 mph, 160 kn)
- Range: 1,148 km (713 mi, 620 nmi)
- Ferry range: 1,783 km (1,108 mi, 963 nmi)
- Service ceiling: 10,000 m (33,000 ft)
- Time to altitude: 5,000 m (16,000 ft) in 6 minutes 43 seconds

Armament

- Guns:
  - 2 × 7.7 mm (0.303 in) Type 97 machine guns in forward fuselage
  - 2 × 20 mm (0.787 in) Type 99 Mark 1 autocannon in the outer wings
- Bombs: 2 × 60 kg (132 lb) bombs

== See also ==
Related development

- Mitsubishi A6M Zero

Aircraft of comparable role, configuration, and era

- Bernard H 110
- Dewoitine HD.780
- Grumman F4F-3S Wildcatfish
- Kawanishi N1K1 Kyōfū
- Loire 210
- Supermarine Spitfire floatplanes

Related lists

- List of aircraft of Japan during World War II
- List of aircraft of World War II
- List of fighter aircraft
- List of military aircraft of Japan

== Bibliography ==
- Dorr, Robert F. and Chris Bishop. Vietnam Air War Debrief. London:Aerospace |Publishing, 1996. ISBN 1-874023-78-6.
- Francillon, R.J. Japanese Aircraft of the Pacific War. London:Putnam, 1970. ISBN 0-370-00033-1.
- Green, William. War Planes of the Second World War, Volume Six: Floatplanes. London: Macdonald & Co., (Publishers) Ltd., 1962.
- Green, William and Gordon Swanborough. The Complete Book of Fighters. New York: Smithmark, 1994. ISBN 0-8317-3939-8.
- Jackson, Robert. Combat Legend: Mitsubishi Zero. Ramsbury, Marlborough, Wiltshire, UK: Airlife Publishing, 2003. ISBN 1-84037-398-9.
- Janowicz, Krzystof. Mitsubishi A6M2-N Rufe (Kagero Famous Airplanes 4) (in Polish/English). Lublin, Poland: Kagero, 2004. ISBN 83-89088-42-8.
- Mikesh, Robert C. Warbird History: Zero, Combat & Development History of Japan's Legendary Mitsubishi A6M Zero Fighter. Osceola, Wisconsin: Motorbooks International, 1994. ISBN 0-87938-915-X.
- Sakaida, Henry. Imperial Japanese Navy Aces, 1937–45. Botley, Oxford, UK: Osprey Publishing Ltd., 1999. ISBN 1-85532-727-9.
- Gunston, Bill. The Illustrated Encyclopedia of Combat Aircraft of World War II. London, UK: Salamander Books Ltd., 1978 ISBN 0-89673-000-X
