= Bernard H.52 =

1930s French floatplane fighter aircraft

H.52
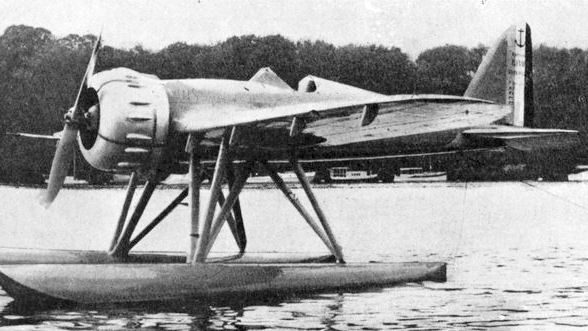

General information
- Type: Floatplane fighter
- National origin: France
- Manufacturer: Société des Avions Bernard
- Number built: 2

History
- First flight: 16 June 1933

The Bernard H.52 was a French floatplane fighter aircraft of the 1930s. It was a single-engine, single-seat monoplane built in the hope that the French Navy would select it. Two prototypes were built, but no production followed.

== Design and development ==
In late 1932, the Société des Avions Bernard proposed to build a floatplane fighter to meet the requirements of the French Navy for a shipboard fighter suitable for operation from the catapults of its battleships and cruisers. The Bernard design, the H.52, was a mid-winged monoplane based on its Bernard 260 landplane fighter, using the same wings, rear fuselage and tail surfaces as the earlier design. It was of all-metal construction, principally duralumin, with a monocoque fuselage and stressed skin cantilever wings that were integrally constructed with the centre fuselage. Leading edge slots and large flaps were fitted to the wing to lower its landing speed, while its undercarriage consisted of two main floats. A single supercharged Gnome-Rhône 9Kdrs radial engine powered the aircraft

The first of two prototypes flew on 16 June 1933, with the second flying in 1934. No production followed, with Bernard choosing to develop a new fighter to meet the requirements of the French Navy, the Bernard H.110. This had a similar layout, with wooden wings and a more powerful engine fitted, but had no more success in attracting orders than the H.52, the French Navy eventually selecting the Loire 210.

== Specifications ==
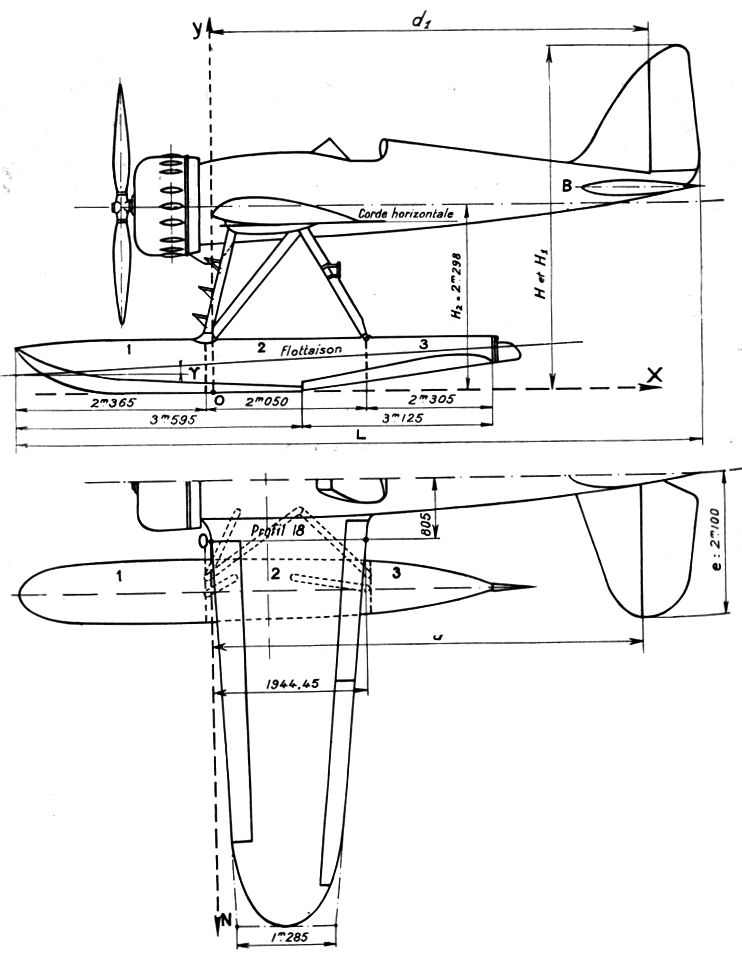
Bernard H.52 2-view drawing from L'Aerophile May 1934

Data from The Complete Book of Fighters

General characteristics

- Crew: 1
- Length: 9.30 m (30 ft 6 in)
- Wingspan: 11.50 m (37 ft 9 in)
- Height: 4.27 m (14 ft 0 in)
- Wing area: 18.2 m^{2} (196 sq ft)
- Empty weight: 1,480 kg (3,263 lb)
- Gross weight: 1,888 kg (4,162 lb)
- Powerplant: 1 × Gnome-Rhône 9Kdrs 9-cylinder air-cooled radial engine, 370 kW (500 hp)

Performance

- Maximum speed: 328 km/h (204 mph, 177 kn) at 4,000 m (13,125 ft)
- Stall speed: 61 km/h (38 mph, 33 kn)
- Range: 600 km (370 mi, 320 nmi)
- Service ceiling: 8,500 m (27,900 ft)
- Time to altitude: 9 minutes to 4,000 m (13,125 ft)

Armament

- Guns: 2× 7.5 mm Darne machine guns under wings

== See also ==
Related lists

- List of flying boats and floatplanes

== Bibliography ==
- Green, William and Gordon Swanborough. The Complete Book of Fighters. New York, Smithmark, 1994. ISBN 0-8317-3939-8.
- Liron, Jean (1990). Les avions Bernard. Collection Docavia. Vol. 31. Paris: Éditions Larivière. ISBN 2-84890-065-2.
- "New Aircraft:The Bernard 52 C I". Flight, 22 March 1934. p. 286.
- "The Fourteenth Paris Airshow". Flight, 22 November 1934, pp. 1236–1250.
