= Bernard SIMB AB 12 =

1920s French fighter aircraft prototype

AB 12
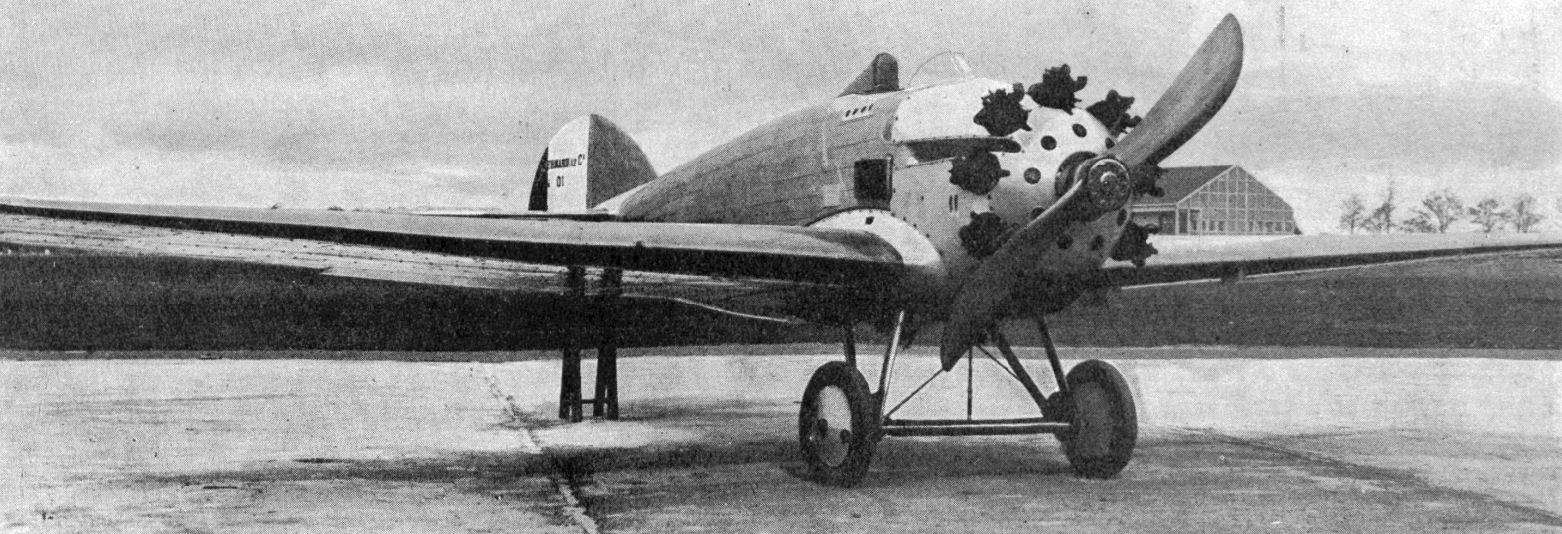

General information
- Type: Single-seat fighter
- National origin: France
- Manufacturer: Société Industrielle des Métaux et du Bois (SIMB), sometimes referred to as Ferbois
- Designer: Jean Galtier
- Number built: 1

History
- First flight: May 1926

The Bernard SIMB AB 12 was a French single engine, single-seat monoplane fighter aircraft built in the 1920s. Though advanced for its time, it failed to gain a production order and only one was built.

== Design and development ==
Like the Bernard SIMB AB 10, the AB 12 was an all-metal, single-seat, monoplane fighter with a low cantilever wing. It differed from the AB10 in having a radial engine, a more conventional undercarriage and four machine guns. The wing plans of both aircraft were similar, straight tapered with squared tips, though the AB 12 had a span 1 m (3 ft 3 in) greater. The empennage of both designs was also similar: the AB 12 had a tailplane with swept leading edges and separate elevators mounted on top of the fuselage and a wide chord, almost straight edged fin, though its rudder, moving between the elevators, ended on the upper fuselage line. The fuselage had an oval cross section with the open cockpit over the wing, a short, faired headrest behind it.

The AB 12 was powered by a 313 kW (420 hp) Gnome-Rhône 9Ab radial, a licence-built Bristol Jupiter. By the standards of the day this was quite well cowled-in for a radial but the cylinder heads protruded for cooling. The details of the gun mounting are not clear, but images show at least one on the starboard side firing through a slot in the nose just above mid-height, the opening extending between two cylinders. The undercarriage of the AB 12 was quite conventional and very different from that of the AB 10. It had a pair of single mainwheels mounted on a single, faired axle, with V-form legs attached to the lower fuselage. The tricycle gear was completed by a tailskid.

Overall, the AB 12 was 40% more powerful but less aerodynamically clean and 7% heavier than the AB 10, so its maximum speed was only 6% higher. Monoplanes in a biplane era, neither design received a production order and only one of each was built.

== Specifications ==
Data from Liron

General characteristics

- Crew: 1
- Length: 7.20 m (23 ft 7 in)
- Wingspan: 12.00 m (39 ft 4 in)
- Height: 2.70 m (8 ft 10 in)
- Wing area: 21.00 m^{2} (226.0 sq ft)
- Empty weight: 900 kg (1,984 lb)
- Gross weight: 1,450 kg (3,197 lb)
- Powerplant: 1 × Gnome-Rhône 9Ab 9-cylinder radial, 310 kW (420 hp)
- Propellers: 2-bladed

Performance

- Maximum speed: 260 km/h (160 mph, 140 kn)
- Service ceiling: 8,500 m (27,900 ft)

Armament

- Guns: 4×7.7 mm (0.303 in) machine guns, 2 Vickers and 2 Darne

== Bibliography ==
- Liron, Jean (1990). Les avions Bernard. Collection Docavia. Vol. 31. Paris: Éditions Larivière. ISBN 2-84890-065-2.
- Bruner, Georges (1977). "Fighters a la Francaise, Part One". Air Enthusiast (3): 85–95. ISSN 0143-5450.
