= Hispano-Suiza 18R =

Water-cooled piston engine used in racing aircraft in the 1920s

18R
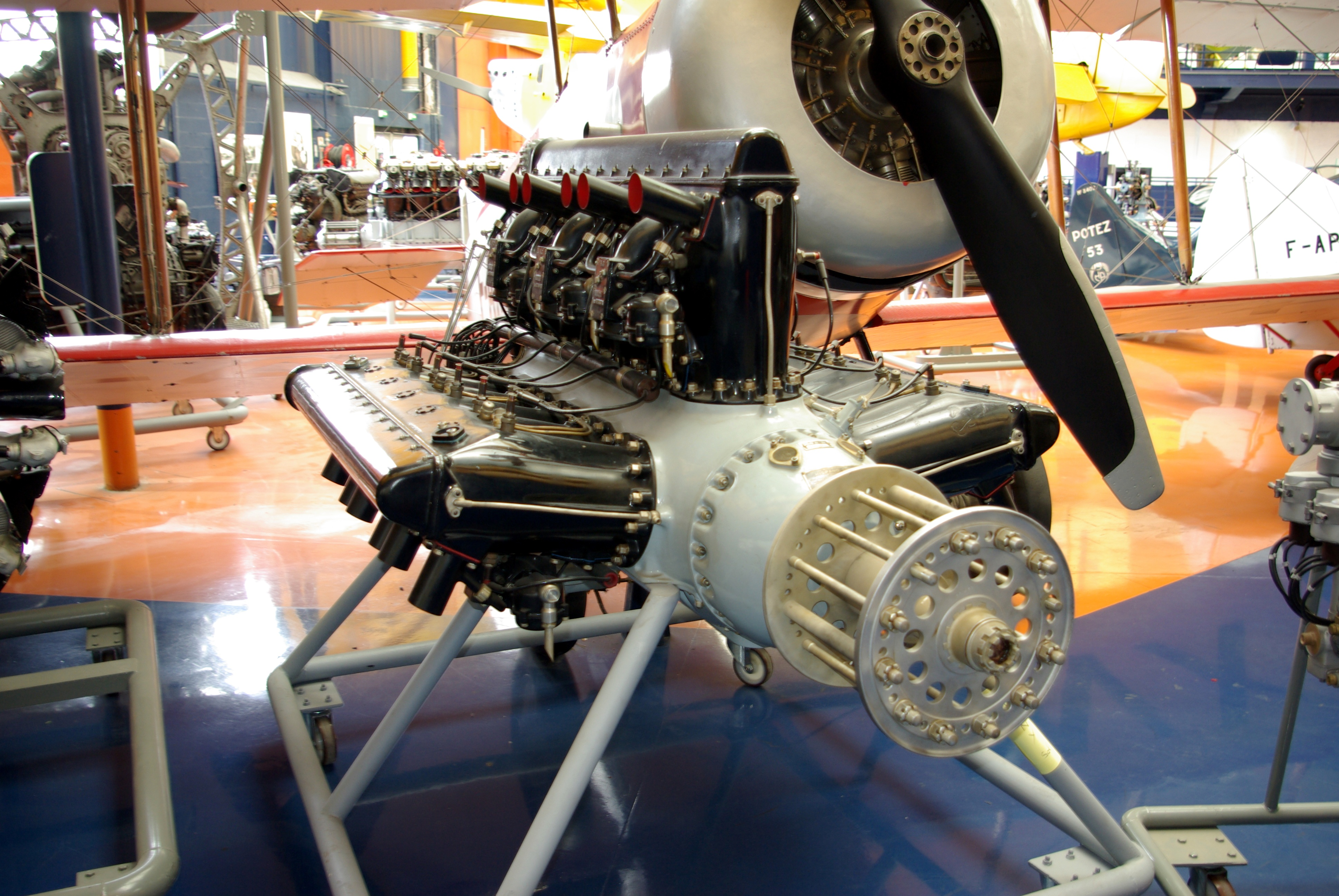
- Hispano-Suiza 18Sbr W-18 engine on display in the Musée de l’Air et de l’Espace in Le Bourget, France.
- Type: W-18 high performance Aeor-engine
- National origin: France
- Manufacturer: Hispano-Suiza
- First run: 1929
- Major applications: Nieuport-Delage NiD 450; Nieuport-Delage NiD 650; Bernard H.V.120; Bernard V-4; Ford 14A
- Developed from: Hispano-Suiza 12N

The Hispano-Suiza 18R was an eighteen-cylinder high performance water-cooled piston engine, in an 80° W or broad arrow layout, for use in racing aircraft, built in France during the latter half of the 1920s.

== Design and development ==
The French Ministère de l’Air did not enter the Schneider Trophy seaplane race for several years, but decided to enter the 1929 competition. Two companies were tasked with designing and building floatplane racers to compete with the entries from Italy and Great Britain, resulting in the Nieuport-Delage NiD-450 and Bernard H.V.120, both of which were powered by the specially designed Hispano-Suiza 18R engines.

To power the racers Hispano-Suiza married three six-cylinder blocks from the Hispano-Suiza 12Nb to a common crankshaft/crankcase, set at 80° to each other. Retaining the 150 mm (5.91 in) bore and 170 mm (6.69 in) stroke of the 12Nb, the 18R had the compression ratio increased from 6.25:1 to 10:1 with a total displacement of 54.075L (3,299.8ci). Each cylinder aspirated through two valves operated by single overhead camshafts with ignition from two spark plugs set on opposite sides of the combustion chamber supplied by magnetos at the rear of the engine. Fuel metering was carried out by nine carburetors each supplying two cylinders.

Construction of the 18R was largely of Elektron magnesium alloy for body components, with high-strength steels for highly loaded parts such as the crankshaft. In common with many multiple-bank and radial engines the pistons were connected to the crankshaft via master and slave connecting rods; the central vertical bank was served by the master rod, which housed the big-end bearing with connecting rods articulating from this to the other two banks. The 18R was available with or without a Farman (bevel planetary) reduction gear.

Development issues delayed production of the engine, with the first geared-drive engine delivered to Nieuport-Delage in October 1929, a month after the 1929 Schneider Trophy race. Despite the effort put into its development the 18R proved to be unreliable and unable to achieve the expected power output. The poor performance of the 18R prompted the development of the 18S, a de-rated version intended for commercial use. Reducing the compression ratio to 6.2:1 at a maximum rpm of 2,000 and replacing the Elektron with aluminium alloy, the 18S was available with or without the Farman reduction gear, but was not a success, only powering the Ford 14A trimotor in the pylon-mounted central nacelle.

== Operational history ==
The 18R and 18S did not have successful careers, only powering four aircraft types in very small production numbers, proving to be totally outclassed by contemporary racing engines, such as the Rolls-Royce R which powered the Supermarine S.6 family of floatplane racers.

== Variants ==
Data from:

18R
The original racing engine with 10:1 compression ratio, available with or without the Farman reduction gearing.
18Sb
The de-rated. 6.2:1 compression ratio, commercial version without the Farman reduction gearing.
18Sbr
The 18Sb with the Farman reduction gearing.

== Applications ==
Data from:

- Nieuport-Delage NiD 450
- Nieuport-Delage NiD 650 (converted from the 2 NiD 450 aircraft)
- Bernard H.V.120
- Bernard V-4 (landplane conversion of the H.V.120-01)
- Ford 14A

== Engines on display ==
One Hispano-Suiza 18Sbr engine is preserved at the Musée de l’Air et de l’Espace (Air & Space Museum), Le Bourget, France.Data from:

== Specifications (18R) ==
Data from

=== General characteristics ===
- Type: W-18 80° water-cooled in-line engine
- Bore: 150 mm (5.91 in)
- Stroke: 170 mm (6.69 in)
- Displacement: 54.1 L (3,301.38 cu in)
- Length: 1,640 mm (64.57 in) without reduction gear, 1,990 mm (78.35 in) with reduction gear
- Width: 1,330 mm (52.36 in)
- Height: 1,170 mm (46.06 in)
- Dry weight: 540 kg (1,190 lb) 18R without reduction gear, 600 kg (1,300 lb) 18R with reduction gear

516 kg (1,138 lb) 18Sb without reduction gear, 590 kg (1,300 lb) 18Sbr with reduction gear

=== Components ===
- Valvetrain: single shaft driven overhead camshaft with one exhaust and one inlet valve per cylinder
- Fuel system: nine carburretors feeding two cylinders each
- Fuel type: gasoline
- Oil system: pressure fed
- Cooling system: water-cooled
- Reduction gear: optional Farman (bevel planetary) geared drive, which weighed 60 kg (130 lb).

=== Performance ===
- Power output: 1,253 kW (1,680 hp) at 2,400 rpm (18S – 745 kW (999 hp) at 2,000 rpm)
- Compression ratio: 10:1 (18S – 6.2:1)

== See also ==
Comparable engines

- Napier Lion

Related lists

- List of aircraft engines
