= Bernard H.V.40 =

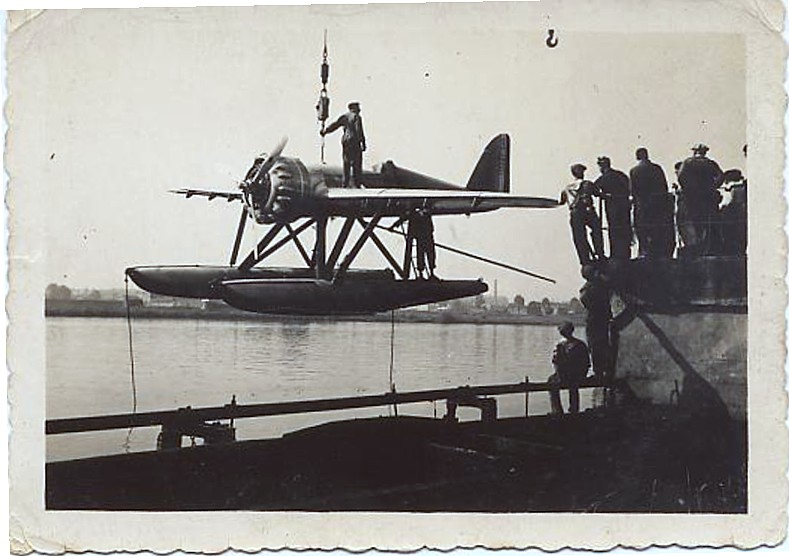

General information
- Type: Single-seat racing seaplane
- National origin: France
- Manufacturer: Société des Avions Bernard
- Designer: Georges Bruner
- Number built: 1

History
- First flight: July 1931

The Bernard H.V.40 was a racing seaplane designed by Société des Avions Bernard for the French government to compete in the 1929 Schneider Trophy.

== Design and development ==
The H.V.40 and H.V.41 were two designs ordered for use by the French team in the 1929 Schneider Trophy. The H.V.40 was designed by Georges Bruner and was similar to the Bernard 20 landplane fighter. It was a streamlined single-seat cantilever monoplane and had two metal floats attached underneath the fuselage on inverted vee-struts. The H.V.40 was to powered by a Gnome-Rhône 9Kfr Mistral radial engine. The aircraft was ready for testing by May 1929 but due to delays with the engine it did not fly and the French government withdrew the team from the 1929 race.

Originally designed to produce 1,000 hp (746 kW) the Mistral never achieved the required power output and the H.V.40 did not fly until July 1931. The first flight was from Lake Berre the base of the French team for the 1931 race. The H.V.40 flew well but had poor high-speed performance and was only used for a number of training flights.

== Specifications ==
Data from The Illustrated Encyclopedia of Aircraft

General characteristics

- Crew: 1
- Length: 7.41 m (24 ft 3.75 in)
- Wingspan: 8.70 m (28 ft 6.5 in)
- Height: 3.60 m (11 ft 9.75 in)
- Wing area: 10.00 m^{2} (107.64 sq ft)
- Powerplant: 1 × Gnome-Rhône 9Kfr Mistral radial piston engine , 597 kW (800 hp)

Performance

- Maximum speed: 420 km/h (261 mph, 227 kn) (estimated)

== See also ==
- Schneider Trophy

Related development

- Bernard H.V.41
- Bernard H.V.42

Related lists

- List of flying boats and floatplanes
