= Bernard H 110 =

Single engine, single seat monoplane floatplane fighter

General information
- Type: floatplane fighter
- National origin: France
- Manufacturer: Société des Avions Bernard (S.A.B.)
- Number built: 1

History
- First flight: June 1935
- Developed from: Bernard H 52

The Bernard H 110 was a single engine, single seat monoplane floatplane fighter designed for a French Navy competition. It flew in 1935 but had only made four test flights when the Bernard company was declared bankrupt, preventing further development.

== Design and development ==
In the early 1930s the French Navy became interested in catapult launched floatplane fighters and the Société des Avions Bernard produced the twin float Bernard H 52 in response, deriving it from their earlier Bernard 20, 74 and 260 land based fighter aircraft. The H stood for the new Naval Hydravion class. The Navy did not adopt the H 52 but put forward a specification which called for supercharging to 4,000 m (13,100 ft) and a stalling speed of less than 100 km/h (62 mph). This brought designs from four manufacturers; one of these, the Bernard H 110, was a H 52 development, slightly larger and with a more powerful engine.

The Bernard H 110 had a mid mounted cantilever wing. In plan, it was straight tapered with elliptical tips. Following the methods used on earlier Bernard aircraft, the wing was a single piece structure which incorporated part of the fuselage. In the place of spars it had six span-wise cells formed from vertical alloy plates separated by spacers close to the wing surface. Each cell was separated from the next by wider spacers, all of which were shaped to the airfoil profile. The H 52 was metal skinned but the H 110 was fabric covered as the Navy found this easier to repair. The cells were vertically expanded at the centre of the wing structure to form the cockpit area of the fuselage between the engine and the rear part. On its trailing edge the wing carried horn balanced ailerons and inboard flaps, with pilot controlled, full span Handley Page slots on the leading edge.

The rear fuselage, beginning just behind the open cockpit and the trailing edge of the wing, was built around four longerons. These connected, via four steel members in the wing centre section, to the engine mountings. The fuselage tapered rearwards to a mid set tailplane and fin. The rudder and separate elevators were both balanced. Ahead of the wing leading edge, the 530 kW (710 hp) Hispano-Suiza 9Vbs nine cylinder radial engine was enclosed by a long chord cowling with small superimposed fairings, two per cylinder, for the valve mechanisms and drove a three blade propeller. The H 100 had a pair of floats close in length to that of the fuselage and fitted with mid-length steps and water rudders at the stern. They were made from védal, duralumin plated with pure aluminium to improve their salt water resistance. Each float was mounted by five streamlined struts, two outwards and upwards to the wing and three upwards to the lower fuselage. This arrangement left the central fuselage to carry bombs if required. The H 110 carried a pair of Darne 7.5 m (0.295 in) calibre machine guns, mounted in the wings just above the floats and firing outside the propeller disc.

The H 110 flew from the Seine in June 1935 without incident, taking off with slots open in six seconds. Three more flights were made before S.A.B. was declared bankrupt. The H 110 then became the property of the administrators and was scrapped and the Navy ordered the Loire 210.

== Specifications ==
Data from Liron

General characteristics

- Crew: 1
- Length: 9.30 m (30 ft 6 in)
- Wingspan: 11.60 m (38 ft 1 in)
- Height: 3.75 m (12 ft 4 in)
- Wing area: 19.00 m^{2} (204.5 sq ft)
- Gross weight: 1,900 kg (4,189 lb)
- Powerplant: 1 × Hispano-Suiza 9Vbs 9-cylinder radial, 530 kW (710 hp)
- Propellers: 3-bladed

Performance

- Maximum speed: 329 km/h (204 mph, 178 kn)
- Service ceiling: 4,000 m (13,000 ft)Armament

Armament

- Guns: 2 × Darne 7.5 mm (0.30 in) machine guns

== Bibliography ==
- Liron, Jean (1990). Les avions Bernard. Collection Docavia. Vol. 31. Paris: Éditions Larivière. ISBN 2-84890-065-2.
