= Bernard 82 =

French long-range bomber prototype

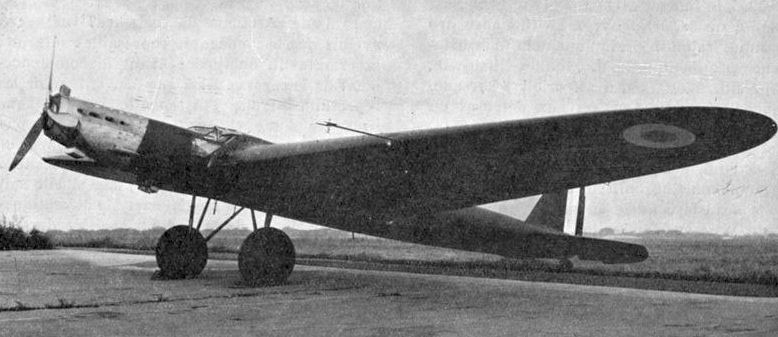
- Bernard 82-B.3 (ca 1934)

General information
- Type: Long-range bomber
- National origin: France
- Manufacturer: Société des Avions Bernard
- Number built: 2

History
- First flight: 11 December 1933
- Developed from: Bernard 80 GR

The Bernard 82 was a French single-engined long-range monoplane bomber designed and built by Société des Avions Bernard. Only two prototypes were built and the type did not enter production.

The Bernard 82 was developed from the long-range Bernard 80 GR, which had been designed to set long-distance-flight records. The all-metal Bernard 82 was a three-seat long-range bomber, known at the time as a bombardier de représailles or reprisal bomber. It was fitted with a relatively large wing, a complex retractable landing gear mechanism, and powered by a single nose-mounted Hispano-Suiza 12Ybrs inline piston engine.

A total of two prototypes were produced; the first made its maiden flight in December 1933 while the second prototype followed during March 1934. Flight testing revealed the landing gear retraction system to be unreliable, forcing more than one belly landing to be performed as a result. Reliable operation was never achieved as testing was wound down following the French government’s decision to cancel the sole order for 10 aircraft that it had placed. While development continued at a much reduced pace for a time, the second prototype being reengined with the intention of participating in air races, both aircraft were eventually scrapped.

== Design and development ==
The Bernard 82 was a cantilever mid-wing monoplane bomber aircraft. It was effectively a scaled-up successor to the Bernard 80 GR, a long range aircraft built to set new endurance records. Specifically, the two aircraft were very similar in terms of their general design; however, the Bernard 82 was provisioned with a higher fuselage and different wings, the latter possessing a greater span, deeper chord, a larger area, and more thickness, the latter being beneficial to the carriage of bombs. While the wing sections belonged to the same family, those used on the Bernard 82 generated greater lift and were set at angle of incidence of four degrees instead of two.

The exterior of the aircraft featured numerous clean lines, which were well suited towards high speed and high-altitude flight, which was a recognised requirement for long-distance bombers at that time. The Bernard 82 was envisioned to evade pursuit by making use of its speed. Further self-defence measures included the provision of several machine guns; these included twin guns in the rear and above the fuselage as well as a single gun that was positioned beneath the fuselage.

The wing comprised a central section, a pair of ailerons with compensating flaps, and two detachable trailing edges. From a structural perspective, the wing design confirmed with traditional practices for the company at that time, using a combination of box spars, boxed main ribs, longitudinal longerons, and a covering composed of plywood. The arrangement of the spar flanges, which was built up from glued piles, formed a sizable manhole that roughly corresponded with the corridor within the fuselage. The fuel tanks were located within the wing, each tank having a capacity of 1,290 liters (340.8 gallons), and provisioned with a mechanism to dump fuel if required to do so.

The fuselage comprised two sections, each of which were attached to the wing via four ball joints. While the rear section was formed of four spruce longerons, frames, and false frames, the forward section comprised a pair of lateral webs and three sturdy box frames. The engine mount was attached to the fuselage at four separate points via bolts directly into the longerons, The engine bearer was composed of L.2 R alloy while the supports were made of welded chrome-molybdenum steel tubing. The aircraft was powered by a single nose-mounted Hispano-Suiza 12Ybrs inline piston engine, capable of generating up to 860 hp (641 kW).

The principal armament comprised up to eight bombs weighing between 100 kg to 200 kg each. These were carried within the wing, each bomb having its own door, which was opened at the moment of release simply by the weight of the bomb; after the bomb passed through, the door would close automatically. The release mechanism was entirely electrical. The mounting of the bombs was achieved from above via openings in the upper surface of the wing.

The Bernard 82 was furnished with divided retractable landing gear, the upper ends of which were directly attached to the wing. While the retractable landing gear system incurred a slightly greater weight, the greater aerodynamic efficiency throughout a long distance flight was felt by the designers to justify the adoption of the complex mechanism.

The landing gear was retracted via the movement of stirrup at the upper end of the oleo strut which slid along an oblique rail that was mounted to the front of the forward longeron. The pilot commanded the raising and lowering of the landing gear via a push button in the cockpit that activated an electric motor, causing the door to open; upon reaching the end of its backward slide, it closed an electric contact and illuminated a signal lamp. A lever released a pair of locking cones as well as starting the oil pump and closing a valve on the jack. The plunger of the jack was depressed and engaged one of the four pulleys for the cables attached to the ends of the oleo struts and the linkages slide along the oblique rails. Upon reaching the end, the door again closed a contact and lit a lamp on the instrument panel, after which the pilot pulled the lever back again. The whole operation took roughly one minute to complete. The lowering of the landing gear also consisted of two distinct operations, the opening of the cover plate and the lowering proper.

The vertical strut carried a Messier-built shock absorber while the wheels were outfitted with differential brakes, also supplied by Messier, that were linked to the rudder bar. The tail skid was fitted with an oleo-pneumatic shock absorber as well as a steerable tail wheel.

The first prototype performed its maiden flight from Le Bourget on 11 December 1933. During March 1934, it was joined by the second prototype. Flight testing showed that the original twin lateral radiators to be inadequate; accordingly, they were replaced by a front-mounted radiator arrangement. Landing gear-related deficiencies were the most persistent difficulty encountered during this phase of development. The retraction mechanism would fail to operate fairly frequently, compelling multiple wheel-up belly landings to be conducted. The problematic system was never fully resolved; flight testing was halted in mid-1935. Around this time, the production contract for ten aircraft was cancelled.

Despite the cancellation, the aircraft continued to be worked on by the company. In August 1936, the second prototype was re-engined with a 650 hp (485 kW) CLM Lille 6As, a licence-built Jumo 205 diesel engine. The diesel-powered aircraft, redesignated Bernard 86, was entered into the 1936 Paris-Saigon-Paris air race. The race was held during September, but the aircraft was not ready by then, thus it did not participate as planned. There were no further flight tests and both prototypes were ultimately scrapped.

== Specifications ==
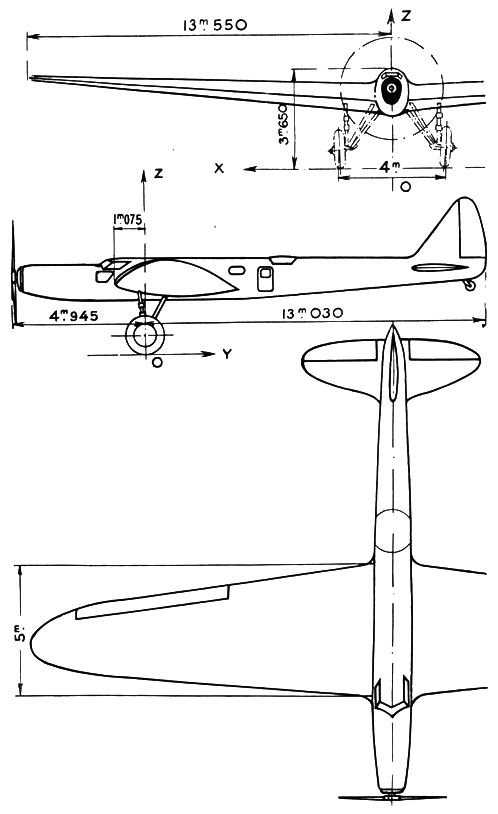
Bernard 82 B3 3-view drawing from L'Aerophile March 1935

Data from The Illustrated Encyclopedia of Aircraft, National Advisory Committee for Aeronautics

General characteristics

- Crew: 3
- Length: 17.98 m (58 ft 11.75 in)
- Wingspan: 27.10 m (88 ft 11 in)
- Wing area: 90.00 m^{2} (968.75 sq ft)
- Empty weight: 2,823 kg (6,224 lb)
- Gross weight: 5,083 kg (11,206 lb)
- Powerplant: 1 × Hispano-Suiza 12Ybrs inline piston engine , 641 kW (860 hp)

Performance

- Maximum speed: 317 km/h (197 mph, 171 kn)
- Cruise speed: 260 km/h (162 mph, 141 kn)
- Range: 2,800 km (1,740 mi, 1,510 nmi)

Armament

- Single or twin 7.7mm (0.303in) dorsal machine-guns
- 4×200kg (441b) and 2×100kg (220lb) bombs (internal)

== See also ==
Aircraft of comparable role, configuration, and era

- Tupolev DB-1
- Vickers Wellesley
