= Lorraine 12Rcr Radium =

1930s French aircraft piston engine

12Rcr Radium
- Type: V12 inverted water-cooled racing piston engine
- National origin: France
- Manufacturer: Lorraine-Dietrich
- First run: March 1931
- Number built: Three complete engines with other part-completed engines used as mock-ups

The Lorraine 12Rcr Radium was an inverted liquid-cooled 60º V12 piston engine, designed specifically for use by French racing seaplanes competing in the Coupe d'Aviation Maritime Jacques Schneider (commonly known as the Schneider Trophy) air races in the early 1930s.

== Design and development ==
From the first Schneider Trophy race in 1913, France had a deep desire to fulfil the requirements of Jacques Schneider by winning the competition three times consecutively. Despite this desire, success for French aircraft was not forthcoming. To help address shortcomings, the STIAé ( service technique et industriel de l'aéronautique) issued a specification to three companies for a racing float-plane to compete in the 1932 Schneider Trophy. Power for the three aircraft was to be supplied by an engine specifically designed for the task, the Lorraine 12Rcr Radium.

The 12 Rcr was an inverted V12 liquid-cooled engine with supercharger and reduction gearbox. Designed to deliver 2,000–2,200 hp (1,500–1,600 kW) at 4,000 rpm, the 12 Rcr had a high specific power from a displacement of only 28.7 L (1,750 cu in) and weight of 510 kg (1,120 lb). Testing on the bench was also carried out with Rateau Turbo-chargers, but

== Operational history ==
Six engines were ordered, but it is unclear how many were completed, as the examples supplied to Bernard and Nieuport-Delage were merely empty shells for use as mock-ups. Bench testing commenced in March 1931, two months after the intended delivery to the airframe manufacturers, progressing slowly, leading to the first delivery of a complete engine to Dewoitine in July 1931. The second engine was tested at the Lorraine plant up to 3,000 rpm, but this highlighted concerns over the airworthiness of the engine, which was rejected for flight use. Once Great Britain had permanently secured the Schneider Trophy, further development of the Schneider racers and their specialised engines was abandoned.

== Applications ==
The 12Rcr was intended to power the following racing seaplanes:

- Bernard H.V.220
- Dewoitine HD.412
- Nieuport-Delage NiD.651

== Specifications (12Rcr) ==
Data from

=== General characteristics ===
- Type: V12 inverted liquid-cooled piston engine
- Bore: 145 mm (5.7 in)
- Stroke: 145 mm (5.7 in)
- Displacement: 28.7 L (1,750 cu in)
- Dry weight: 510 kg (1,120 lb) dry

=== Components ===
- Supercharger: Rateau mechanical two-stage supercharger with a hydromechanical drive running at 7:1 crankshaft speed.

=== Performance ===
- Power output: 1,500–1,600 kW (2,000–2,200 hp) at 4,000 rpm
- Specific power: 0.3487 kg/kW (0.5733 lb/hp)}
