= Bernard H.V.42 =

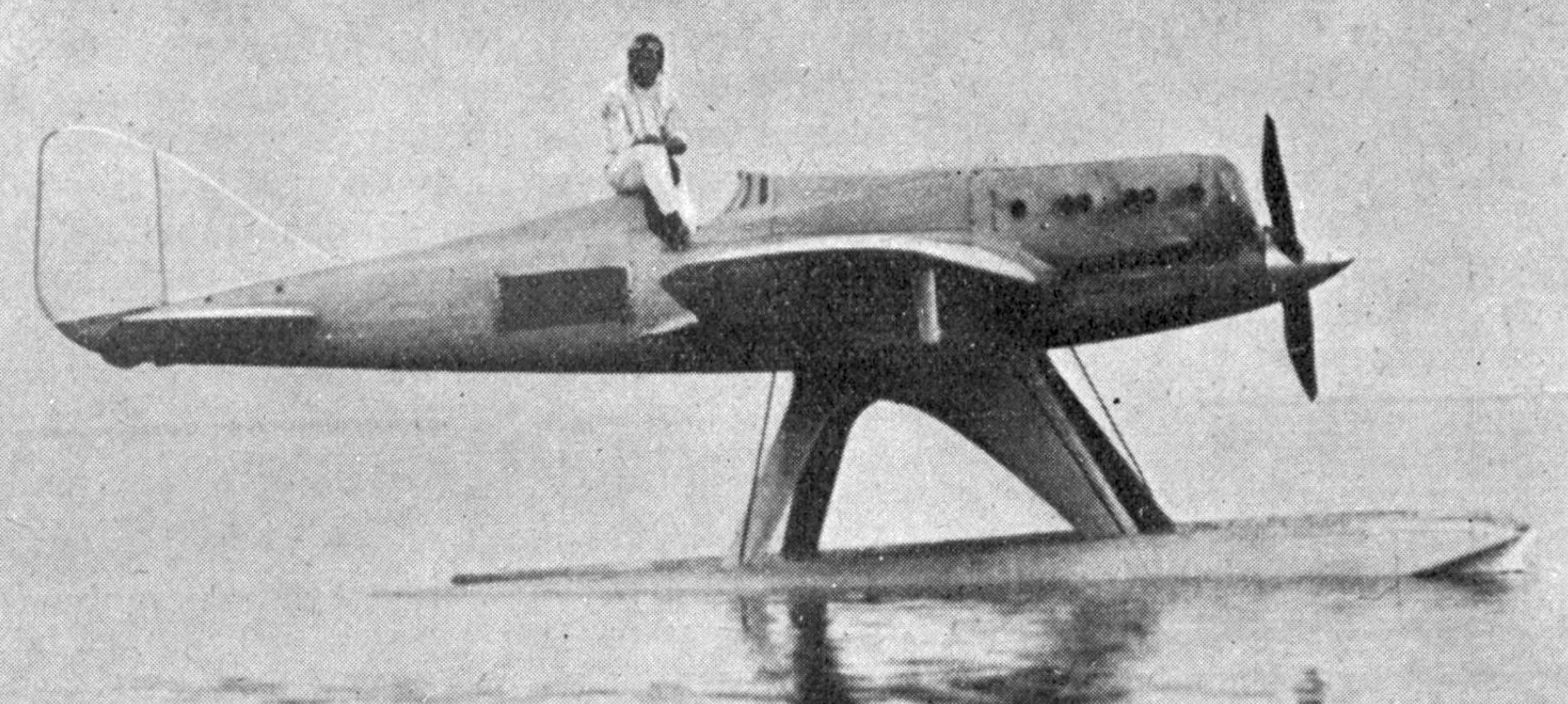
- Bernard H.V.41 photo from L'Aérophile December, 1929.

General information
- Type: Single-seat racing seaplane
- National origin: France
- Manufacturer: Société des Avions Bernard
- Number built: 3

History
- First flight: 10 March 1931

The Bernard H.V.42 was a racing seaplane designed by Société des Avions Bernard for the French government for use of the French Schneider Trophy team.

== Design and development ==
Three H.V.42s were ordered by the French government for use as trainers for the French Schneider Trophy team at Lake Berre. Similar to the earlier H.V.41 they were streamlined single-seat cantilever monoplanes with twin floats. The first H.V.42 flew on 10 March 1931 and was soon joined by the other two. Marked as "1" "2" and "3" they were used during the summer of 1931 to train the French team for the 1931 race.

== Specifications ==
Data from The Illustrated Encyclopedia of Aircraft

General characteristics

- Crew: 1
- Length: 7.99 m (26 ft 2.5 in)
- Wingspan: 9.20 m (30 ft 2.25 in)
- Height: 3.60 m (11 ft 9.75 in)
- Wing area: 12.00 m^{2} (129.17 sq ft)
- Powerplant: 1 × Hispano-Suiza 12Nsr Special inline piston engine , 746 kW (1,000 hp)

Performance

- Maximum speed: 450 km/h (280 mph, 240 kn) (estimated)

== See also ==
- Schneider Trophy

Related development

- H.V.40
- H.V.41

Related lists

- List of flying boats and floatplanes

== Bibliography ==
- Liron, Jean (1990). Les avions Bernard. Collection Docavia. Vol. 31. Paris: Éditions Larivière. ISBN 2-84890-065-2.
- Meurillon, Louis (October 1976). "La Coupe Schneider et la Société des Avions Bernard (4)" [The Schneider Cup and the Bernard Company, Part 4]. Le Fana de l'Aviation (in French) (83): 3–7. ISSN 0757-4169.
- Meurillon, Louis (November 1976). "La Coupe Schneider et la Société des Avions Bernard (5)" [The Schneider Cup and the Bernard Company, Part 5]. Le Fana de l'Aviation (in French) (84): 3–7. ISSN 0757-4169.
- The Illustrated Encyclopedia of Aircraft (Part Work 1982-1985). Orbis Publishing.
