= Bernard AB 1 =

French WW1 bomber aircraft

AB 1

General information
- Type: night bomber
- National origin: France
- Manufacturer: Ets Adolphe Bernard
- Designer: Louis Béchereau
- Status: abandoned
- Primary user: Armée de l'Air
- Number built: 11

History
- First flight: 1918-9

The Adolphe Bernard AB was a twin-engined French biplane aircraft, built near the end of the First World War. Ten AB 1 BN2 bombers were produced for the Armée de l'Air but did not reach squadron service; post-war, two civil derivatives were considered but only one aircraft was built.

== Design and development ==
The AB 1, built near the end of the First World War, was the first original design from the Adolphe Bernard factory, which had previously produced SPAD aircraft to government contracts. It was a twin engine biplane bomber, carrying 600 kg (1,300 lb) of bombs.

The AB 1 BN2 was a wooden three bay biplane, without stagger but with greater span on the upper planes. Only the lower wings carried dihedral. The outer and mid interplane struts were outward leaning pairs but the inner bay was defined by a complex of struts supporting the engines midway between the wings. Head on, these appeared as a V based on the lower wing but had M and W arrangements seen side-on above and below the engine. The AB 1 used Hispano-Suiza V-8 piston engines, of which type there was a surplus after the Armistice. It had ailerons on both upper and lower wings, externally connected.

The fuselage of the AB 1 BN2 was flat-sided, with a narrowed but flat-topped decking. There was a gunner's position in the extreme nose fitted with a 7.7 mm (0.303 in) machine gun on a TO 4 mounting. The fuselage tapered rearwards with the cantilever tailplane, which carried separate elevators, mounted on top. The fin carried a horn balanced rudder which extended down to the bottom of the fuselage, moving between the elevators.

Its main undercarriage had a wide track, with twin wheels on short axles mounted below each engine on inverted V struts, themselves further braced to the lower fuselage longerons.

The first AB 1 BN2 was built in 1918 and probably flew that year. There were plans for a variant using more powerful Hispano-Suiza 8Ba engines, the AB 2, but this was not built. Post war, two civilian variants were started, the post-carrying AB 3 and the passenger only or passenger plus post AB 4. The AB 3, one of which was completed in 1920, could carry a useful load of 905 kg (1,995 lb). The AB 4, which had the same engines as the proposed AB 2, would have carried a maximum of seven passengers. Its fuselage was on display at the 6th Paris Aero Show in December 1919, but it was not completed.

== Operational history ==
Ten AB 1s were produced after the Armistice but do not seem to have achieved squadron service.

== Variants ==
AB 1 BN2
Night Bomber to the 1918 BN2 Service Technique de l'Aéronautique (STAe) specification, as supplied to the Armée de l'Air, powered by two 180 hp (130 kW) Hispano-Suiza 8 Ab water-cooled v-8 engines: Eleven built.
AB 2
Proposed version with 200 hp (150 kW) Hispano-Suiza 8Ba engines: Not built.
AB 3
Post carrying civil version of AB 1, powered by two 180 hp (130 kW) Hispano-Suiza 8 Ab or 200 hp (150 kW) Hispano-Suiza 8Ba engines, with 19.47 m (63.9 ft) span wings: One built 1920.
AB 4
Airliner/post carrier version of AB 2, powered by two 200 hp (150 kW) Hispano-Suiza 8Ba engines. Maximum seven passengers, depending on postal load: One partly built 1919.

== Specifications (AB 1 BN2) ==
Data from Les avions Bernard, French aircraft of the First World War

General characteristics

- Crew: 2
- Length: 11.30 m (37 ft 1 in)
- Wingspan: 18.95 m (62 ft 2 in)
- Height: 3.65 m (12 ft 0 in)
- Wing area: 83 m^{2} (890 sq ft)
- Empty weight: 1,660 kg (3,660 lb)
- Gross weight: 2,895 kg (6,382 lb)
- Powerplant: 2 × Hispano-Suiza 8 Ab water cooled V-8 piston engine, 130 kW (180 hp) each
- Propellers: 2-bladed (later 4)

Performance

- Maximum speed: 161 km/h (100 mph, 87 kn) at 2,000 m (6,600 ft)
- Service ceiling: 4,900 m (16,100 ft)
- Rate of climb: 2.1 m/s (410 ft/min) to 2,000 m (6,600 ft)
- Time to altitude: 4,000 m (13,000 ft) in 15 minutes 45 seconds

Armament

- Guns: 1 × 7.7 mm (0.303 in) machine gun in nose
- Bombs: 600 kg (1,300 lb)
