= Bernard H.V.41 =

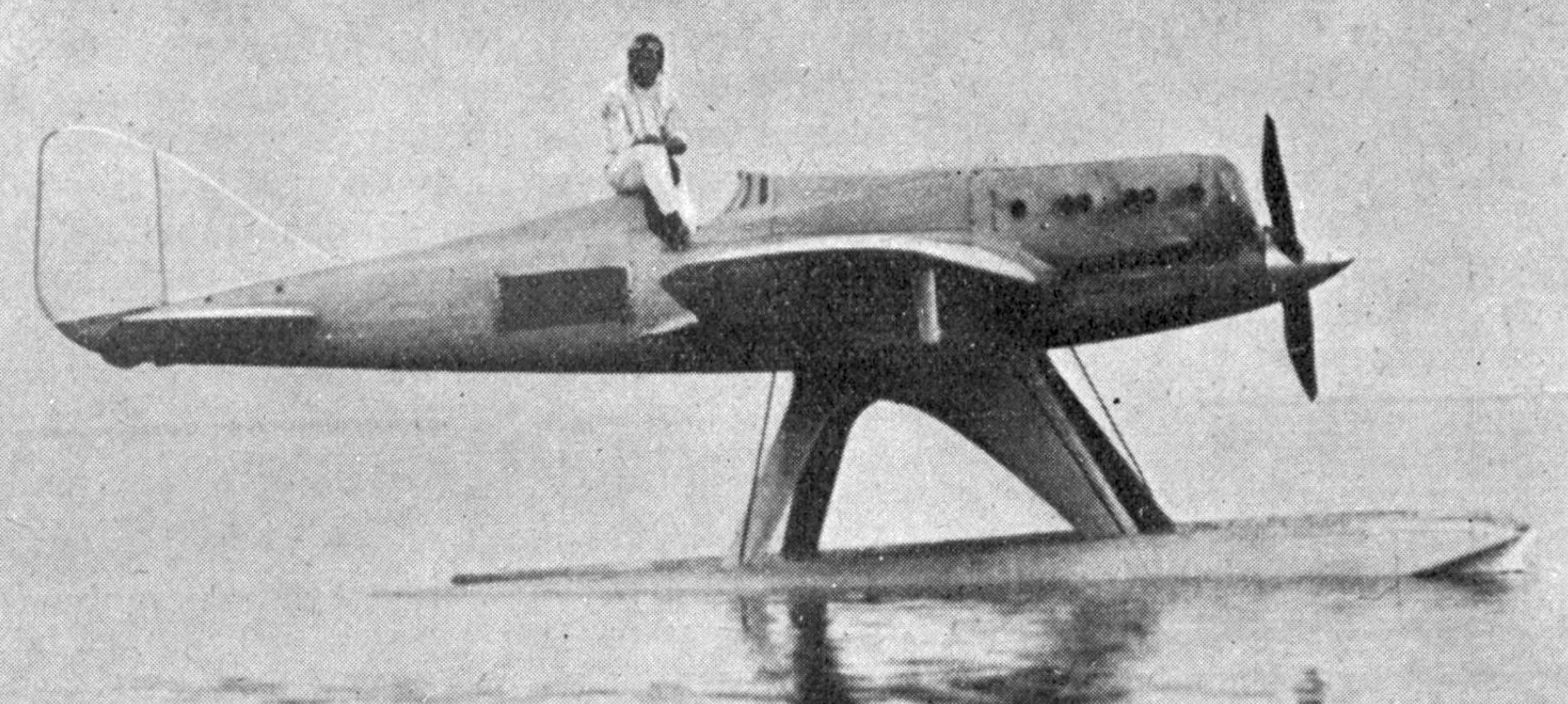

General information
- Type: Single-seat racing seaplane
- National origin: France
- Manufacturer: Société des Avions Bernard
- Number built: 1

History
- First flight: August 1929

The Bernard H.V.41 was a racing seaplane designed by Société des Avions Bernard for the French government to compete in the 1929 Schneider Trophy.

== Design and development ==
The H.V.41 and H.V.40 were two designs ordered for use by the French team in the 1929 Schneider Trophy. Although the H.V.40 was to be powered by a radial engine, the H.V.41 was to use a new liquid-cooled Hispano-Suiza 12Ns Special. It was a streamlined single-seat cantilever monoplane and had two metal floats attached underneath the fuselage on inverted vee-struts. The H.V.41 was ready for testing by July 1929 but due to delays with the engine it did not fly until August and the French government withdrew the team from the 1929 race. The aircraft was then used for training by the French Schneider Trophy team.

== Specifications ==
Data from The Illustrated Encyclopedia of Aircraft

General characteristics

- Crew: 1
- Length: 7.99 m (26 ft 2.5 in)
- Wingspan: 9.20 m (30 ft 2.25 in)
- Height: 3.20 m (10 ft 6 in)
- Wing area: 12.00 m^{2} (129.17 sq ft)
- Powerplant: 1 × Hispano-Suiza 12Ns inline water cooled piston engine , 746 kW (1,000 hp)

Performance

- Maximum speed: 450 km/h (280 mph, 240 kn) (estimated)

== See also ==
- Schneider Trophy

Related development

- H.V.40
- H.V.42

Related lists

- List of flying boats and floatplanes
