= Bernard 80 GR =

French experimental long-range aircraft

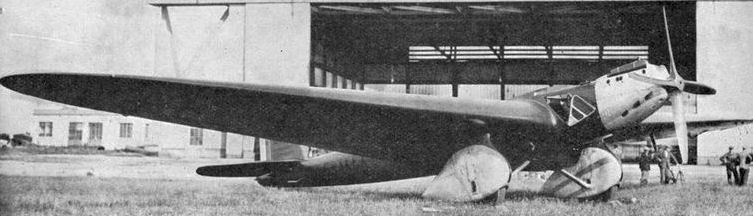
- Bernard 81 GR

General information
- Type: Long-range aircraft
- National origin: France
- Manufacturer: Société des Avions Bernard (S.A.B.)
- Designer: Jean Galtier
- Number built: 1

History
- First flight: 27 November 1930
- Variant: Bernard 82

The Bernard 80 GR was one of three types built by different French constructors in response to a government call for an aircraft capable of setting new long-distance records. A single-engine monoplane with a crew of two, the 80 GR set an absolute record for flight over a closed circuit in April 1931, covering 8,960 km (5,569 mi). Modifications led to a new designation as the Bernard 81 GR but no more records were set despite several attempts.

== Design and development ==
In 1929 France regained the world straight line and closed circuit distance records with the Breguet 19 TR Point d'Interrogation. Both non-stop flights in this open cockpit aircraft covered about 8,000 km (4,970 mi), and it was obvious that longer flights would require better crew protection. Albert Caquot, executive director of the French Air Ministry, therefore announced a prize of one million francs for the prototype of an aircraft that could fly for 10,000 km (6,214 mi) against a 35 km/h (22 mph) headwind. Three manufacturers responded, resulting in the Blériot 110, the Dewoitine 33 Trait d'Union and the Bernard 80 GR L'Oiseau Tango. "Tango" referred both to the orange colour of the aircraft and to an earlier Bernard aircraft, a Bernard 18 GR named L'Oiseau Tango. The "GR" designation used for both Bernard designs and by other long-range French aircraft stood for Grand Raid (French: Grand Foray), meaning extreme long-distance flight. The last of the three to fly, the Bernard was flown for the first time on 27 November 1930 by Antoine Paillard.

The Bernard 80 was a monoplane with a cantilever wing of high aspect ratio (8.6). The wing planform was straight-tapered with elliptical tips. Five fuel tanks on each side provided a total capacity of 7,000 L (1,540 imp gal; 1,849 US gal). Differential ailerons were fitted. The wing was a single-piece wooden structure with two spars and plywood ribs, plywood-skinned with canvas covering. It thickened continuously towards the centre, where its depth increased rapidly to form part of the fuselage. This centre section contained four parallel steel tubes which joined the front and rear fuselage sections to it. An oval internal opening, 0.7 m (28 in) high and 0.45 m (18 in) wide, gave access from the nose to the rear.

The nose section contained the V-12 Hispano-Suiza 12Nb engine, which produced 462 kW (620 hp) at 2,000 rpm and drove a two-blade propeller. A chin radiator was mounted below the fuselage firewall, with a long, prominent fairing behind it. The engine mountings were extended rearwards beyond the pilot's cabin to join the steel tubes in the wings. The cabin, fitted with dual controls, was accessed via glazed triangular doors, which provided sufficient sideways vision for cruising flight. A hatch, provided with a small windscreen, was used for take-offs and landings by raising the pilot's seat. The navigator sat alongside the pilot on a drop seat. His space, 2 m (79 in) long and 1 m (39 in) wide, had side and roof windows for sightings. Internally, the rear part of the fuselage, mounted on the other end of the wing's four steel tubes, provided a space for the crew to rest during a long flight. The aerodynamically clean, tapered, elliptical rear section was built around four longerons, with a plywood skin and outer fabric sheath. The tailplane was mounted on top of the fuselage and the fin and rudder together were roughly elliptical. The fixed, tailwheel undercarriage had split axles hinged to the bottom of the fuselage, with the wheels and main legs enclosed in narrow, wide-chord fairings.

After the successful record flight of March 1931 described below, the aircraft returned to the factory at Bourget to be modified for further record attempts. The wing area was increased by a 2 m (79 in) span extension, the wheel fairings were refined and, most noticeably, the chin radiator was removed and replaced with ones in the wing leading edges. The engine was replaced by a similar-but-geared-down version, the Hispano-Suiza 12Nbr, driving a three-blade propeller, which was later replaced by one with four blades. Post-modification, the aircraft was re-designated as the Bernard 81 GR. It first flew in this form in August 1931, named the Antoine Paillard in memory of its first pilot, who had died suddenly under surgery for appendicitis two months before. Later it was renamed the L'Oiseau Canari II, recalling the earlier record breaking Bernard 191GR L'Oiseau Canari.

== Operational history ==
In response to several fatal crashes the French government had imposed restrictions on the long-range flights from France required by attempts on the straight-line distance record. Bernard therefore concentrated on the closed-circuit record, which at the time of the 80 GR's first flight was held by the Italians Umberto Madalena and Fausto Cecconi. They had flown 8,188 km (5,089 mi) in a Savoia-Marchetti S.64. The 80 GR was taken to Oran in Algeria, then part of Metropolitan France, in February 1931. In a first attempt, flying a 15 km (9.3 mi) for over 50 hours, Paillard and Louis Mailloux (Professor of Navigation at the École d'Aéronautique de Versailles) covered 8,168 km (5.076 mi). Higher-than-expected fuel consumption was blamed on the fixed-pitch Chauvière propeller, so this was replaced by a variable pitch Ratier. Whilst this was being done, a new record of 8,822 km (5,483 mi) was set on 1 March by Maurice Rossi and Lucien Bossoutrop in the Blériot 110. On 30 March the Bernard took off again, piloted this time by Jean Mermoz and Paillard, to set a new record of 8,960 km (5,569 mi) in a time of 52 hours 44 minutes. They landed on 2 April with fuel still available, brought down by loss of coolant; during the last part of the flight, they pumped champagne, eau de Vittel and coffee into the radiator. The record was short-lived, for on 10 June 1931 Doret and Le Brix flew the Dewoitine 33 a distance of 10,371 km (6,446 mi).

After completing the transformation into the 81 GR in August, planning began for an attempt on the straight-line record with a flight from Oran to South America, which would also win a one-million-franc prize. The attempt was blocked by the unwillingness of the French authorities to grant clearance, partly in response to the recent Dewoitine 33 crash. Instead, there was an attempt to regain the closed-circuit record. On 29 December the 81 GR, carrying 8,500 L (1,870 Imp gal, 2,245 USgal) of fuel and piloted by Mermoz, attempted to take off. After a deliberately long run the tail lifted and the large propeller hit the ground, the undercarriage collapsed, and the 81 GR slid on its belly, fortunately without catching fire. Mermoz and Mailloux escaped with a few bruises.

After its repair the 81 GR made a second and final attempt to regain the record. Even during take-off from Istres on 18 October 1932, Mermoz noticed the aileron controls were slack. The ailerons themselves vibrated and there were large oscillations of the wings, with amplitude as much as 1 m (39 in). He dumped most of the fuel and returned, landing safely. It turned out that the wing oscillations were excited by a very stiff undercarriage suspension that transmitted ground forces into the wings, the motion of which damaged the aileron control runs.

Almost a year later, after a new administration lifted the ban on long-range flights, an attempt on the straight-line record was made at last. By this time the record was held by Rossi and Codos in the Blériot 110 at 9,104 km (5,658 mi). L'Oiseau Canari II left Oran on 4 October 1933, crewed by Jean Assolant and René Lefèvre, hoping to reach Saigon in French Indochina. After 24 hours they realized that the engine was consuming 10 litres (2.2 imp gal; 2.6 US gal) of fuel per hour more than expected, an excess of about 0.6%. This put the record just out of reach: the Fédération Aéronautique Internationale's (FAI's) stipulation that the old record had to be beaten by 100 km (62.1 mi) left them an estimated 200 km (124 mi) short. They therefore landed in Karachi, having flown 6,600 km (4,100 mi) in 27 hours. An inaccurate revolution counter may have been partly to blame for the over-consumption.

The L'Oiseau Canari II was later re-engined with a 671 kW (900 hp) two-row radial Gnome-Rhône 14Kfs engine, perhaps because Hispano-Suiza reclaimed their loaned engined. It was designated the 84 GR but never flew. There was also a proposed bomber project, the unbuilt Hispano-powered 81 Bn3, which led to the Bernard 82 and its own variants.

== Variants ==
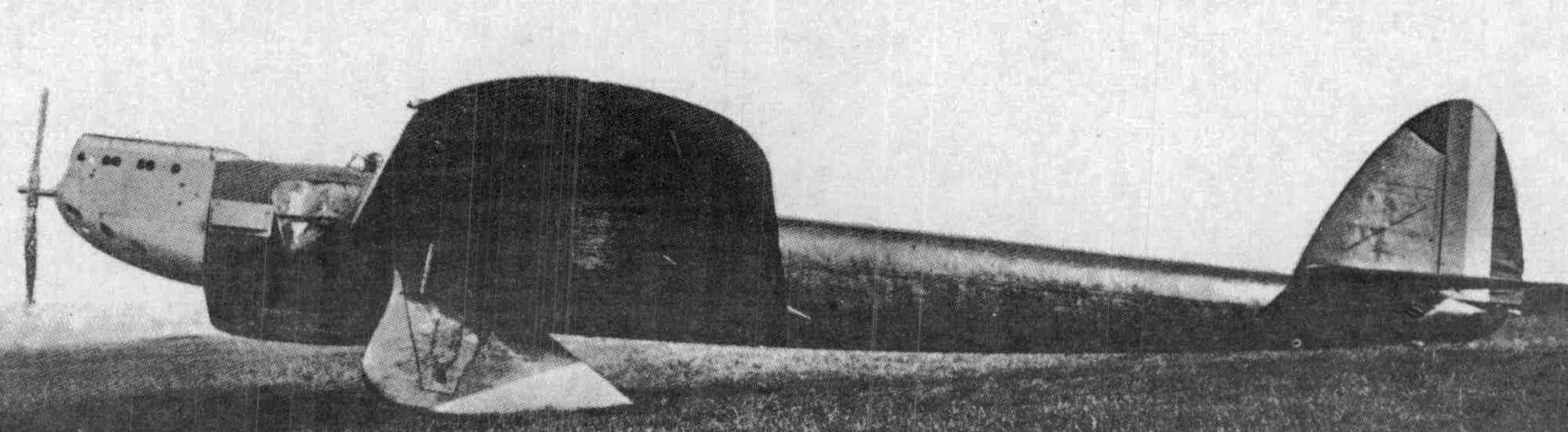
Bernard 80 GR photo from NACA Aircraft Circular No.147

Bernard 80 GR
Prototype of a long-range record-breaking aircraft, powered by a single V-12 Hispano-Suiza 12Nb engine, named L'Oiseau Tango. (GR - Grand Raid - extreme long distance)
Bernard 81 GR
The 80 GR re-designated after being re-engined with a Hispano-Suiza 12Nbr driving a three-bladed (later four-bladed) propeller, re-named L'Oiseau Canari II.
Bernard 81 Bn3
A proposed bomber variant of the 81 GR, which resulted in the Bernard 82
Bernard 82
A bomber version, known as a bombardier de représailles - reprisal bomber, powered by a single Hispano-Suiza 12Ybrs V-12 engine.
Bernard 84 GR
The L'Oiseau Canari II was re-engined with a 670 kW (900 hp) Gnome-Rhône 14Kfs two row radial engine, as the Bernard 84 but the aircraft never flew after conversion.

== Specifications (81 GR) ==
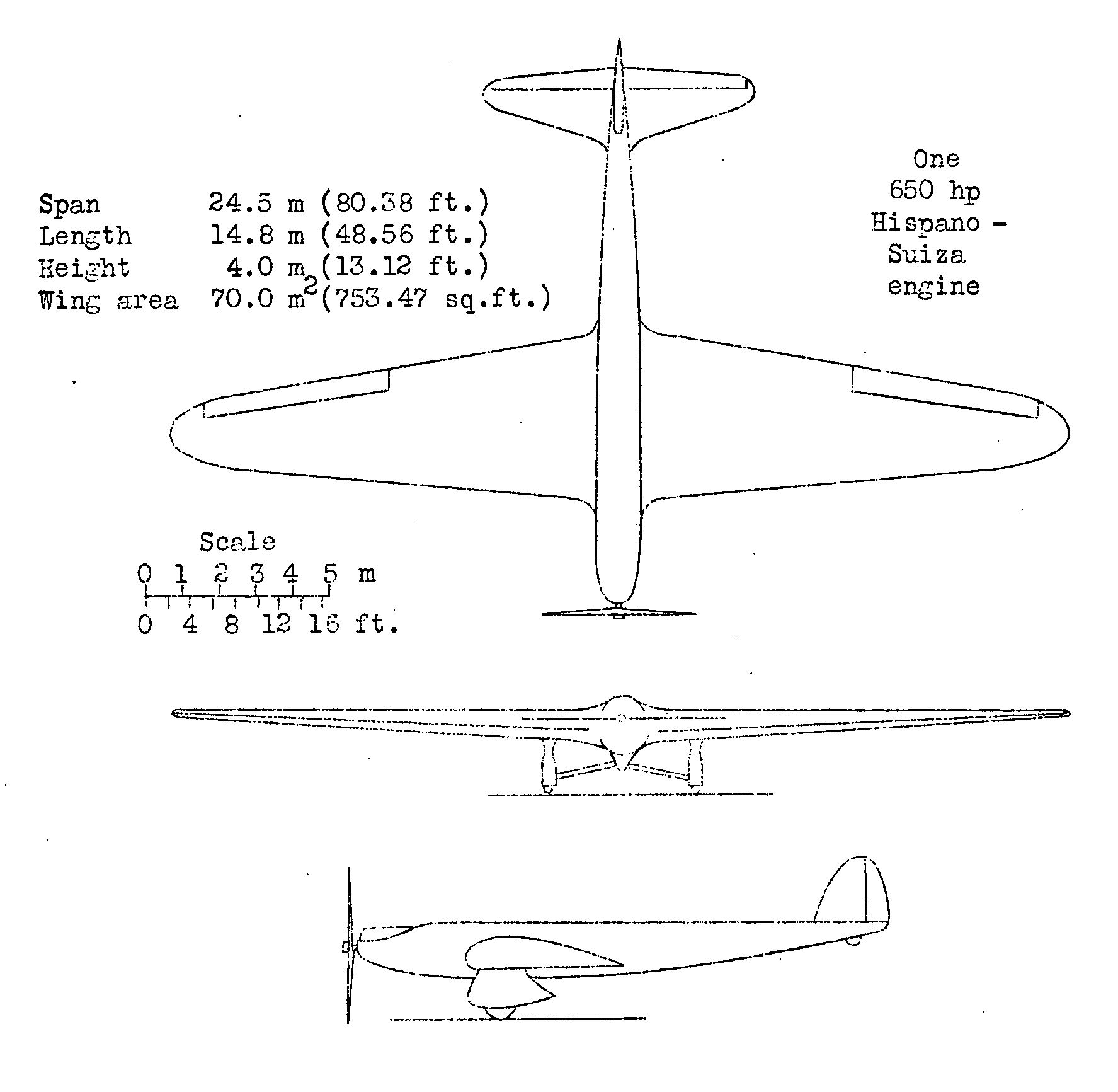
Bernard 80 GR 3-view drawing from NACA Aircraft Circular No.147

Data from Liron (1990)

General characteristics

- Crew: 3
- Length: 15.47 m (50 ft 9 in)
- Wingspan: 26.50 m (86 ft 11 in)
- Height: 4.65 m (15 ft 3 in)
- Wing area: 80.0 m^{2} (861 sq ft)
- Empty weight: 3,300 kg (7,275 lb)
- Gross weight: 10,800 kg (23,810 lb)
- Powerplant: 1 × Hispano-Suiza 12Nbr Water-cooled V-12, 480 kW (650 hp)
- Propellers: 4-bladed

Performance

- Maximum speed: 200 km/h (120 mph, 110 kn)
- Range: 11,300 km (7,000 mi, 6,100 nmi)
- Service ceiling: 9,000 m (30,000 ft)

== Bibliography ==
- Liron, Jean (1990). Les avions Bernard. Collection Docavia. Vol. 31. Paris: Éditions Larivière. ISBN 2-84890-065-2.
- Meurillion, Louis (June–July 1969). "Les Bernard 80-81 (1)" [The Bernard 80-81, Part 1]. Le Album de Fanatique de l'Aviation (in French) (2): 28–30. ISSN 0757-4169.
- Meurillion, Louis (August–September 1969). "Les Bernard 80-81 (2)" [The Bernard 80-81, Part 2]. Le Album de Fanatique de l'Aviation (in French) (3): 22–25. ISSN 0757-4169.
