= Bernard H.V.220 =

1930s French racing seaplane

H.V.220
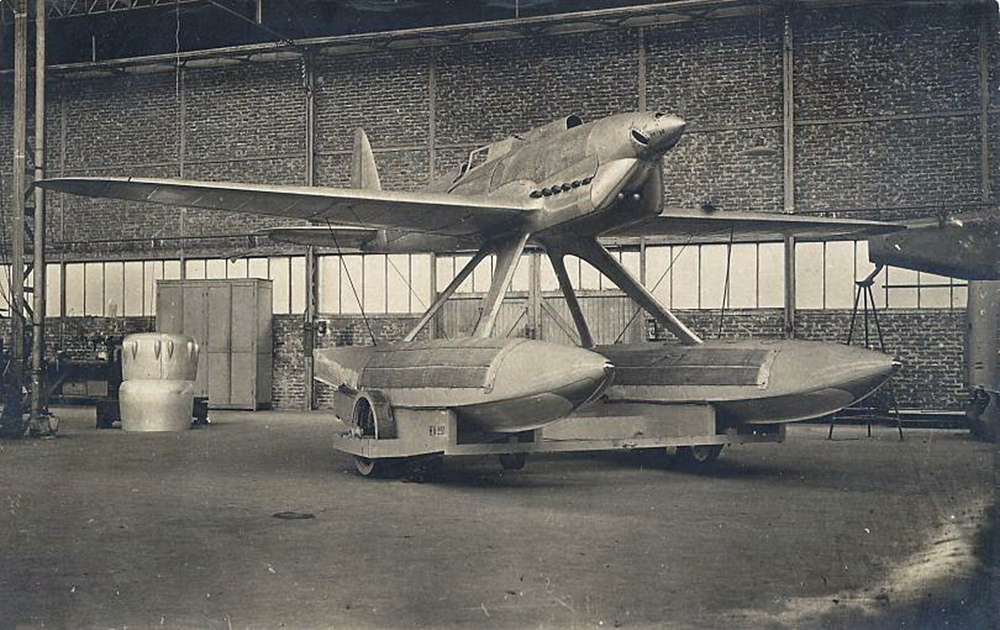
- H.V.220 3-view drawing

General information
- Type: Racing seaplane
- National origin: France
- Manufacturer: Société des Avions Bernard
- Status: Not flown
- Number built: 1

The Bernard H.V.220 was a 1930s French racing seaplane and the last attempt by Bernard compete in the Schneider Trophy race. Delays caused by engine problems meant the aircraft was abandoned and never flown.

== Design and development ==
The H.V.220 was an all-metal single-seat cantilever monoplane with twin floats and powered by a 2,200 hp (1,641 kW) Lorraine 12Rcr Radium inline piston engine. The aircraft was completed but problems with the Radium engine were never sorted and the aircraft was not flown ending French hopes of a Schneider Trophy win. An improved variant powered by a Radium engine was planned as the H.V.320 but never built.

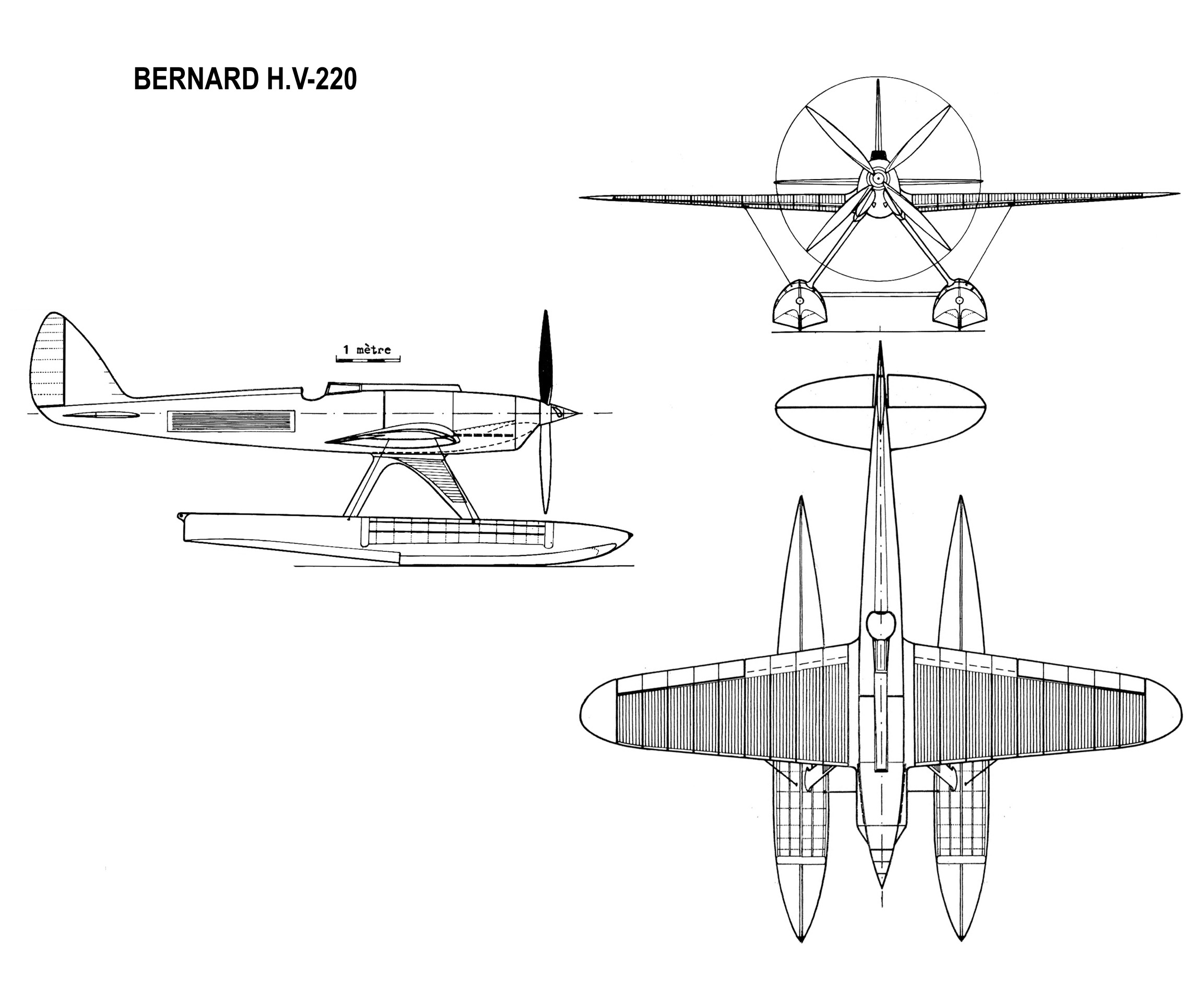

== Specifications (H.V.220) ==
Data from Illustrated Encyclopedia of Aircraft

General characteristics

- Crew: 1
- Length: 9.46 m (31 ft 0 in)
- Wingspan: 9.40 m (30 ft 10 in)
- Height: 3.96 m (13 ft 0 in)
- Wing area: 13.86 m^{2} (149.2 sq ft)
- Empty weight: 1,790 kg (3,946 lb) estimated
- Max takeoff weight: 2,500 kg (5,512 lb) estimated
- Powerplant: 1 × Lorraine 12Rcr Radium V-12 inverted liquid-cooled piston engine, 1,600 kW (2,200 hp)
- Propellers: 4-bladed Levasseur, 3.20 m (10 ft 6 in) diameter

Performance

- Maximum speed: 640 km/h (400 mph, 350 kn) estimated
