= Bernard SIMB AB 10 =

French single-engine single-seat monoplane

AB 10

General information
- Type: Single seat fighter
- National origin: France
- Manufacturer: Société Industrielle des Métaux et du Bois (SIMB), sometimes referred to as Ferbois
- Designer: Jean Hubert
- Number built: 1

History
- First flight: August 1924

The Bernard SIMB AB 10 was a French single-engine, single-seat, highly streamlined, cantilever, all-metal low-wing monoplane of advanced design. It first flew in 1924 but was not ordered into production.

== Design and development ==
The Bernard SIMB AB 10 or Bernard SIMB AB 10 C 1 single-seat fighter, which first flew in the summer of 1924, first appeared in public as the SIMB AB-C 1 at the Paris Aero Show of 1922. The AB in this name stood for Adolphe Bernard and C for chasseur (English: fighter) with 1 indicating single-seat. Advanced for its time, it was a streamlined cantilever low-wing monoplane with a closely cowled, liquid-cooled engine.

The AB-C.1 was an all-metal aircraft with straight-edged, slightly tapered wings which had straight wing tips tips rounded at the leading edge. Ailerons extended to the tips. The tail surfaces had straight swept leading edges but had rounded trailing edges on the control surfaces. The tailplane was mounted on top of the fuselage and the rudder extended to the bottom of the fuselage, moving between separate elevators.

Its fuselage, rounded in cross-section, tapered to the rear and curved down forwards over the engine to the low-mounted two-blade propeller. The open cockpit, with a brief, faired headrest, was placed over the middle of the wing. It had a conventional undercarriage with a pair of single mainwheels and a tailskid, but the mainwheel mounting was unusual, a wide-chord faired inverted T-shaped pylon. The engine was a 224 kW (300 hp) Hispano-Suiza V-8, cooled by a pair of Lamblin radiators placed horizontally side by side below the fuselage.

It was at this stage of its development that the AB-C.1 was displayed at the Paris Aero Show in December 1922, though without its rather ugly radiators. Over twenty months passed before the first flight of what became the SIMB AB 10. In this period the wing structure was revised and the span extended by 800 mm (2 ft 7 in) with more squared-off tips. The fin area was increased with a curved leading edge and the elevator trailing edge straightened. The SIMB AB 10 had its radiators close to each other, vertical and side by side, just ahead of the central undercarriage member. A late alteration braced the faired axle with vertical V-form struts on each side. It finally flew in August 1924, piloted by Florentin Bonnet.

In a biplane age it was judged too radical and expensive, so no production order was awarded.

== Specifications (AB 10) ==
Data from Liron (1990) p.224

General characteristics

- Crew: 1
- Length: 7.00 m (23 ft 0 in)
- Wingspan: 11.00 m (36 ft 1 in)
- Height: 2.75 m (9 ft 0 in)
- Wing area: 19.20 m^{2} (206.7 sq ft)
- Gross weight: 1,350 kg (2,976 lb)
- Powerplant: 1 × Hispano-Suiza 8Fb V-8 water cooled piston engine, 220 kW (300 hp)
- Propellers: 2-bladed

Performance

- Maximum speed: 245 km/h (152 mph, 132 kn)
- Service ceiling: 6,000 m (20,000 ft)

== Bibliography ==
- Bruner, Georges (1977). "Fighters a la Francaise, Part One". Air Enthusiast (3): 85–95. ISSN 0143-5450.
- Liron, Jean (1990). Les avions Bernard. Collection Docavia. Vol. 31. Paris: Éditions Larivière. ISBN 2-84890-065-2.
