= Société des Avions Bernard =

Defunct French aircraft manufacturer

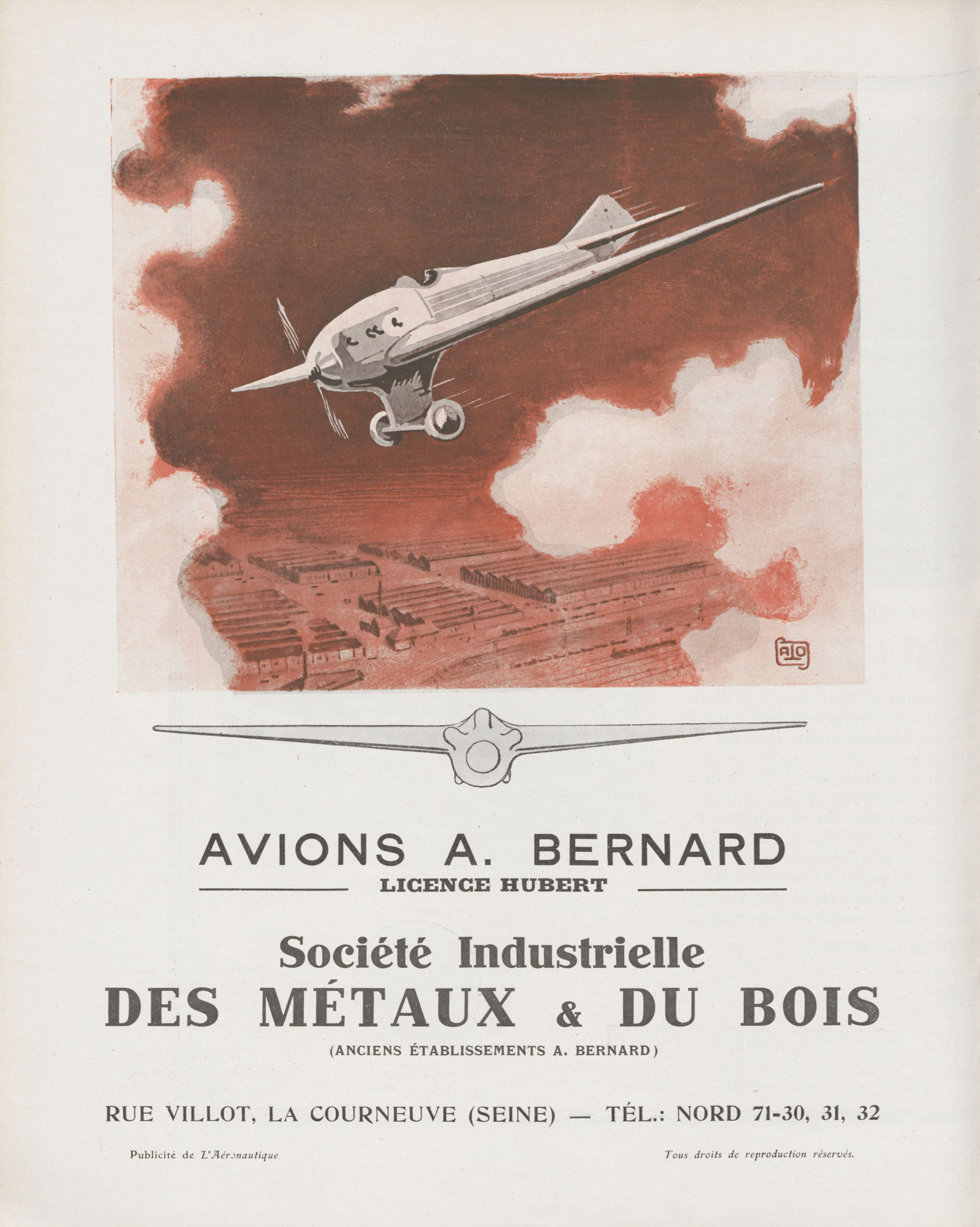
- Industry: Aeronautics, defence
- Founded: April 1917; 109 years ago
- Founder: Adolphe Bernard
- Defunct: 1935
- Fate: Merged
- Headquarters: La Courneuve, France
- Key people: Jean Hubert
- Products: Aircraft

Société des Avions Bernard (English: Bernard Aircraft Company) was a French aircraft manufacturer of the early 20th century.

== History ==
The company was founded in April 1917 by Adolphe Bernard as Etablissements Adolphe Bernard to licence-build SPAD fighters. Immediately after the war, the company was reorganised as Société Industrielle des Métaux et du Bois ("SIMB") to cover a wider product range. It built no new aircraft until 1922, when an aircraft division was formed with Jean Hubert, as head designer. The company was bankrupt in 1927.

Bernard re-formed it a last time under the name Société des Avions Bernard to build a small production run of airliners for CIDNA. In 1935, Hydravions Louis Schreck FBA was purchased. However, the business was struggling again before the French aviation industry was nationalised in 1935.

== Aircraft ==
The list shows those types which were at least partially built. Data and naming style from Liron (1990).

Etablissements Adolphe Bernard

- Bernard AB 1 Twin-engine medium bomber. 11 built. 1918. The AB 2 was a proposed higher-powered version.
- Bernard AB 3 Post-carrying version of AB 1, 1920.
- Bernard AB 4 Unfinished passenger version of AB 2, exhibited 1919.

Société Industrielle des Métaux et du Bois (S.I.M.B.)

- Bernard AB.C1 Fighter, 1922 redesignated AB 10 before first flight.
- Bernard SIMB AB 3M Twin-fuselage, three-engine bomber. Two unfinished, 1923. The AB 3 T was a proposed civil version.
- Bernard SIMB V.1 Racer. One built, 1924.
- Bernard SIMB V.2 V.1 with shorter span. One built, 1924. The V.3 was a proposed development with retractable undercarriage.
- Bernard SIMB AB 10 Revision of AB.C1, 1924.
- Bernard SIMB AB 10T Three-engined, eighteen-seat seaplane, unfinished, 1925.
- Bernard SIMB AB 12 Fighter. One built, 1926.
- Bernard SIMB AB 14 Fighter. One built, 1925.
- Bernard SIMB AB 15 Fighter. One built, 1926.
- Bernard SIMB AB 16 Three-engine, five-seat "colonial" type. One built, 1927.

Société des Avions Bernard (S.A.B.)

- Bernard 18 Eight-seat transports. Two built, 1927
- Bernard 190 Ten-seat transports, Fourteen built, 1928.
- Bernard 20 Single-seat fighter. One built, 1929.

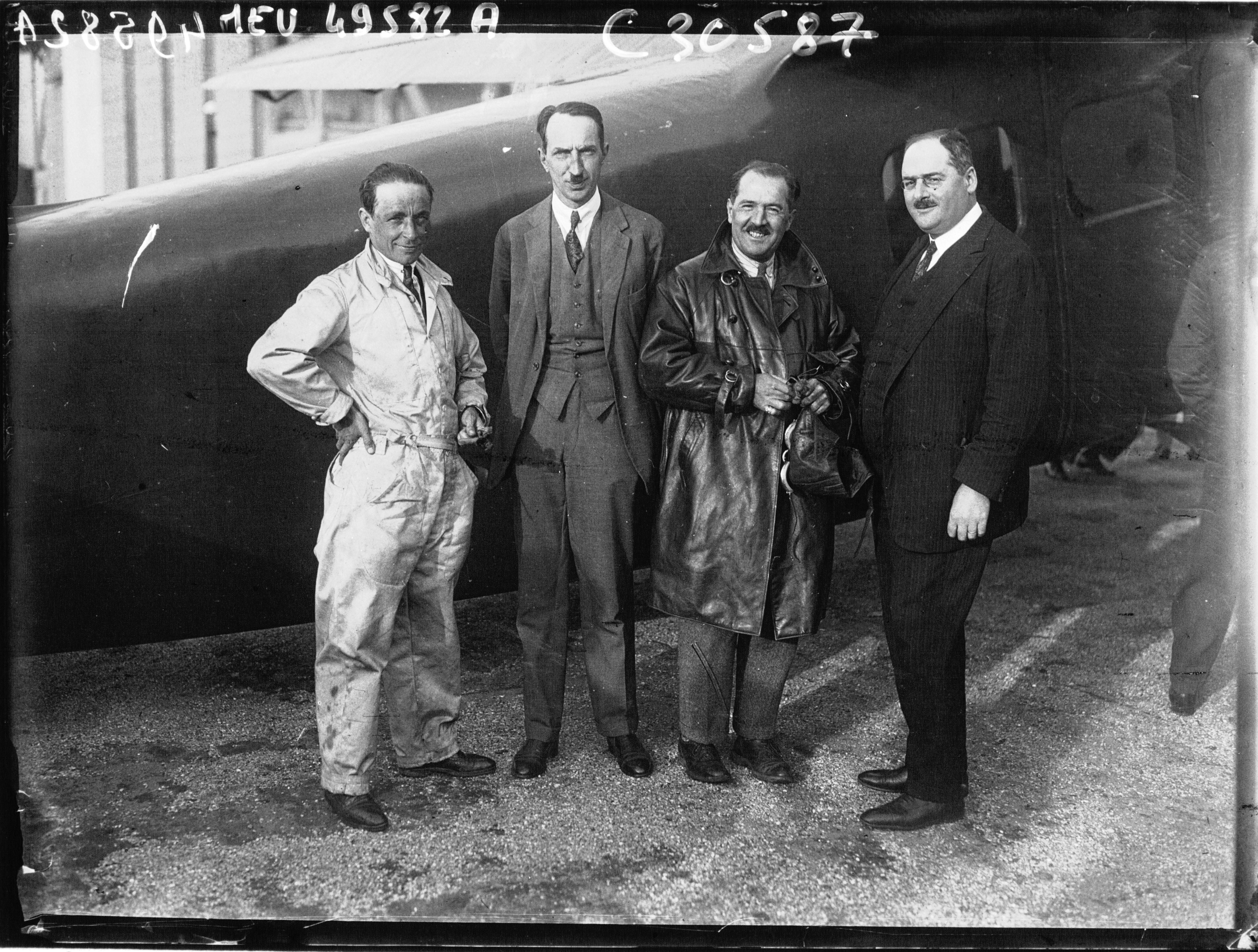
Laulhé (pilot), Hubert (technical director), Tarascon (pilot) and Bernard (PDG), Bernard-Hubert 18T "Oiseau Tango"

- Bernard 30 T Twin-fuselage transport. Unfinished 1931.
- Bernard HV 40 Single-seat racing floatplane. One built 1929.
- Bernard HV 41 Single-seat racing floatplane. One built 1929.
- Bernard HV 42 Single-seat racing training floatplane. Three built, one converted from HV 41, 1931.
- Bernard H 52 Single-seat catapult launched floatplane fighter. Two built, 1933.
- Bernard 60 T Three-engine fourteen-seat transport. Two built, 1929.
- Bernard 70 Series of single-seat, single-engine sports and fighters. Three built, 1929.
- Bernard 80 GR Long-range record holder. One built, 1930. Modified into 81 GR.
- Bernard 82 Bomber variants of Bernard 80. Two built, 1933. The Bernard 86 was an experimental diesel powered modification, 1936.
- Bernard H 110 Single-seat floatplane fighter. One built, 1935.
- Bernard HV 120 Single-seat racing floatplane. Two built, 1930.
- Bernard 160 Colonial military multi-role aircraft. Two built, 1932.
- Bernard 200 Series of three/four-seat light aircraft. Four built, 1932.
- Bernard HV 220 Single-seat racing floatplane. One built, 1931.
- Bernard 260 Single-seat fighter. Two built, one flown, 1932.
- Bernard HV 320 Single-seat racing seaplane. Not flown, 1931.
- Bernard V.4 Derivative of HV 120. Not flown, 1933.

== See also ==
- List of aircraft manufacturers
