= Loire 210 =

French single-seat catapult-launched fighter seaplane

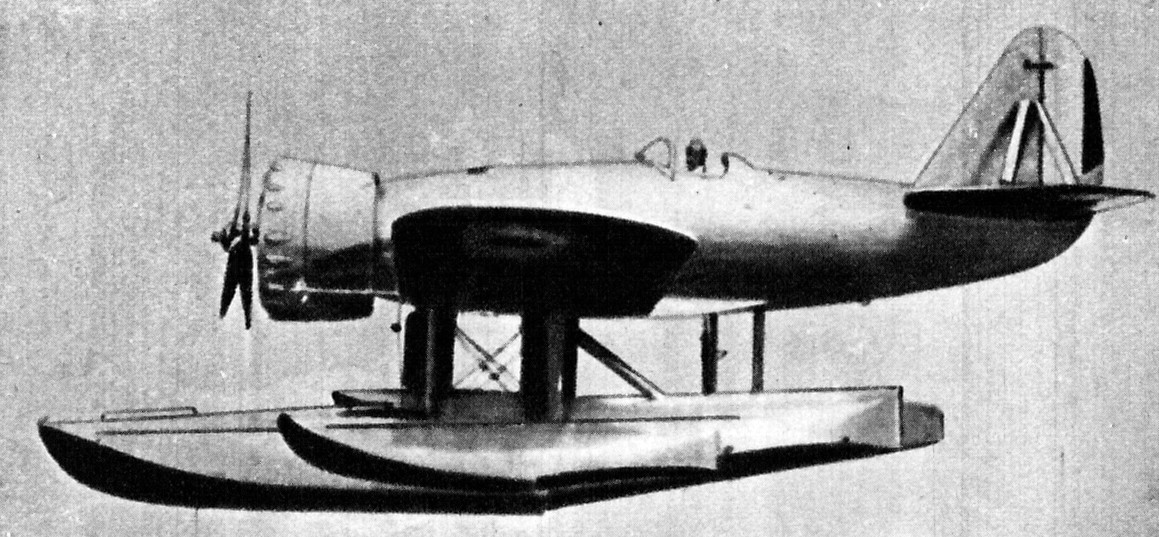

General information
- Type: Single-seat fighter seaplane
- Manufacturer: Loire
- Primary user: French Navy
- Number built: 21

History
- Introduction date: 1939
- First flight: 21 March 1935
- Retired: 1939

The Loire 210 was a French single-seat catapult-launched fighter seaplane designed and built by Loire Aviation for the French Navy.

== Design and development ==
The Loire 210 was designed to meet a 1933 French Navy requirement for a single-seat catapult-launched fighter seaplane. The prototype first flew at Saint Nazaire on 21 March 1935. The fuselage came from the earlier Loire 46 fitted with a new low-wing which was foldable for shipboard stowage. It had a large central float and two underwing auxiliary floats and was powered by a single nose-mounted Hispano-Suiza 9Vbs radial engine.

The prototype was evaluated by the French Navy against the Bernard H 110, Potez 453 and Romano R.90 with the 210 achieving a production order for 20 aircraft in March 1937. The production aircraft were fitted with four wing-mounted Darne machine guns (the prototype had only two).

== Operational history ==
The aircraft entered service with the French Navy in August 1939, within three months five aircraft had been lost due to structural failure of the wing. All the remaining aircraft were grounded and withdrawn from use.

== Variants ==
Loire 210.01
First prototype aircraft.
Loire 210
Single-seat fighter seaplane.
Loire 211
Prototype with a more powerful Gnome-Rhône 14K engine.

== Operators ==
France

- French Navy
  - Escadrille HC.1
  - Escadrille HC.2

== Specifications ==
Data from The Complete Book of Fighters

General characteristics

- Crew: 1
- Length: 9.51 m (31 ft 2.75 in)
- Wingspan: 11.79 m (38 ft 8.25 in)
- Height: 3.80 m (12 ft 5.25 in)
- Wing area: 20.3 m^{2} (218.5 sq ft)
- Gross weight: 2,100 kg (4,629 lb)
- Powerplant: 1 × Hispano-Suiza 9Vbs radial piston engine , 537 kW (720 hp)

Performance

- Maximum speed: 299 km/h (186 mph, 162 kn)
- Cruise speed: 199.5 km/h (124 mph, 108 kn)
- Range: 750 km (466 mi, 405 nmi)
- Service ceiling: 8,000 m (26,250 ft)
- Rate of climb: 9.4 m/s (1,897.8 ft/min)

Armament

- 4 x 7.5 mm (0.295 in) Darne machine guns (wing-mounted)

== See also ==
Related lists

- List of flying boats and floatplanes
- List of aircraft of the French Air Force during World War II
