= Bernard 20 =

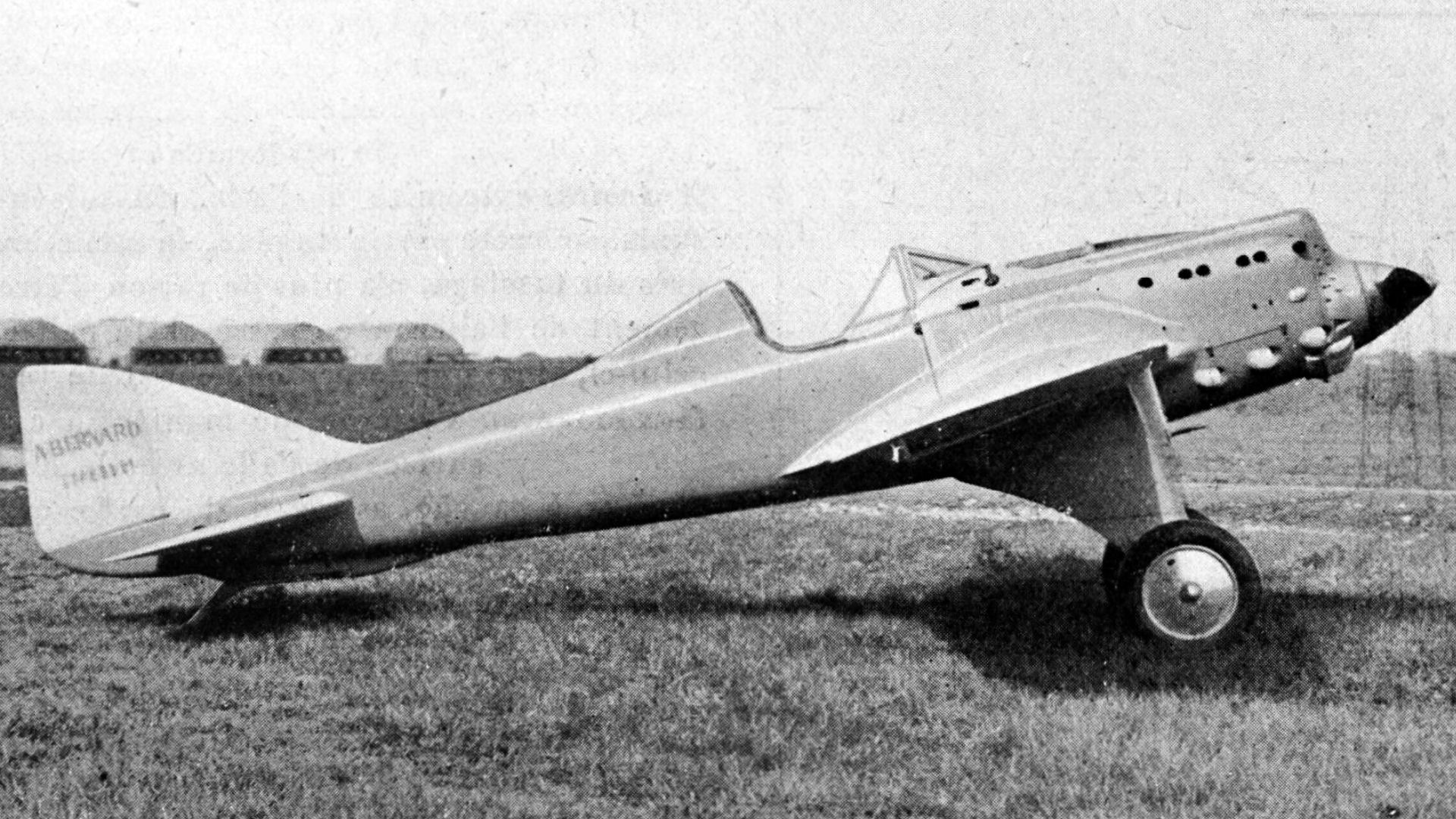

General information
- Type: Single-seat monoplane fighter aircraft
- National origin: France
- Manufacturer: Bernard
- Number built: 1

History
- First flight: July 1929

The Bernard 20 was a single-seat monoplane fighter aircraft designed and built by the French aircraft manufacturer Société des Avions Bernard.

Derived from the Bernard V2 racing aircraft, the Bernard 20 was originally displayed as a mock-up at the 1928 Paris Air Show. During July 1929, the sole prototype, which was powered by a 400 hp (298 kW) Hispano-Suiza 12Jb inline piston engine, performed its maiden flight from Orly. Having retained much of its racing inheritance, it was a relatively fast aircraft for the era. During 1930, the aircraft was recorded at a speed of 280 km/h (174 mph). However, there was a lack of interest in the project from French authorities, allegedly officials were not keen on the monoplane configuration at that time, thus the project was abandoned after 18 months of test flying.

== Design and development ==
The Bernard 20 was almost entirely constructed out of wood, except for several of the fittings. It consisted of three primary sections: a one-piece wing (the raised middle section of which formed the middle section of the fuselage), a rear section that carried the tail unit, the forward section containing the engine mount, and the landing gear. All four sections were assembled using quickly detachable joints, facilitating their easy dismantling for repair, replacement, or ground transport.

Structurally. the wing consisted of narrow juxtaposed box girders with plywood webs and spruce flanges that also formed the surface of the wing. Additional framework elements including the leading edge and trailing edge sections, box ribs and wooden strips. In order to validate the wing’s strength, a series of successful static tests were conducted, including a partial bending test with a load factor of 8, a torsional test with a load factor of 2.5, and a bending test to the point of failure that gave a safety factor of 13.2. Relatively rigid flight controls were used to actuate the slender ailerons.

At the centre of the wing, these members crossed at a height to form the middle portion of the fuselage; this arrangement made the primary wing structure a continuous girder of considerable strength while also reserving a central space of sufficient dimensions that accommodated the forward portion of the cockpit. Additionally, a steel tube traverses this block at each corner along with attachment points for both the engine mount within the forward portion of the fuselage and the rear fuselage section.

The framework of the rear fuselage section comprised a pair of vertical box girders that worked in conjunction with a pair of longerons with uprights, cross pieces and transverse formers. It featured a double covering, the inside of which was reinforced via a series of narrow longitudinal strips. The forward fuselage was attached to the wing section via four fittings. The rear section was perforated to permit the passage of the aircraft’s one-piece stabilizer, which had four points of fixation. The tail surfaces, which included a two-part elevator, had a similar structure to that of the wing.

The Bernard 20 was powered by a single direct-drive Hispano-Suiza 12Jb V-12 engine, capable of generating up to 400 hp (298 kW). Access to the engine was achieved via a series of large panels mounted on longitudinal hinges. The fuel tanks were located within the wing section on both sides of the fuselage; a fuel dump facility was present for handling an emergency situation. The oil tank was within the engine section, being effectively combined with the oil radiator, which is flush with the outside of the fuselage. The water radiator was located underneath the wing. The engine bay was covered by a duralumin shell that formed the nose of the aircraft; it was attached via four bolts to tubes that traversed the central portion of the wing.

The primary members of the landing gear were a pair of laminated wooden panels, one of which was directly attached to either side of the enlarged central section of the wing. The lower ends were connected by a pair of tubes, between which were the two half-axles. Bechereau shock absorbers worked in combination with elastic cords that were enclosed within panels.

The cockpit was furnished with a single adjustable seat, complete with a large reinforced head rest, for the pilot. Protection against capsizing was achieved via a relatively high windshield comprising steel tubes that were capable of withstanding stresses of up to 5,000 kg (11,023 lb); an opening was also provided so that the pilot could escape from the aircraft if it were to completely overturn on the ground. Ground transportation of the aircraft was to be eased by the adoption of a special steel-tubing support to achieve the disassembling of the fuselage and wing with relative ease; a false central section, likewise made of steel tubing, would be substituted for transit. The assembly of the engine block, fuselage, tail surfaces and landing gear could be taken along the road on its own wheels while the wing would have to be separately transported on a trailer.

== Specifications ==
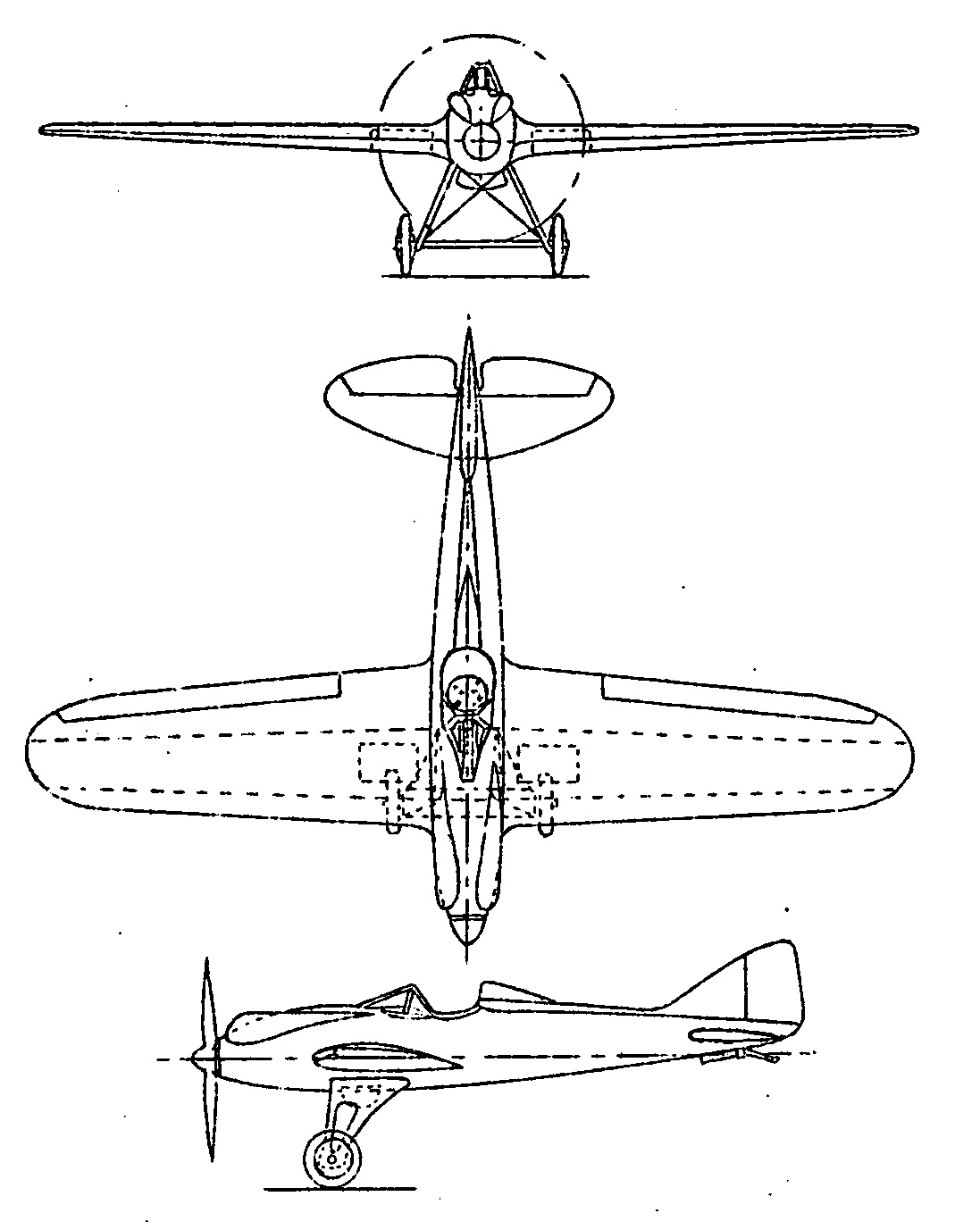
Bernard 20 3-view drawing from NACA Aircraft Circular No.98

Data from The Illustrated Encyclopedia of Aircraft, National Advisory Committee for Aeronautics

General characteristics

- Crew: 1
- Length: 7.45 m (24 ft 5 in)
- Wingspan: 10.80 m (35 ft 5 in)
- Height: 2.50 m (8 ft 2 in)
- Wing area: 16.70 m^{2} (179.8 sq ft)
- Empty weight: 1,023 kg (2,255 lb) equipped
- Max takeoff weight: 1,370 kg (3,020 lb)
- Powerplant: 1 × Hispano-Suiza 12Jb V-12 water-cooled piston engine, 300 kW (400 hp)

Performance

- Maximum speed: 280 km/h (170 mph, 150 kn)

Armament

- Guns: Two fixed 7.7 mm (0.303 in) synchronised machine-guns
