= Beecraft Honey Bee =

Honey Bee
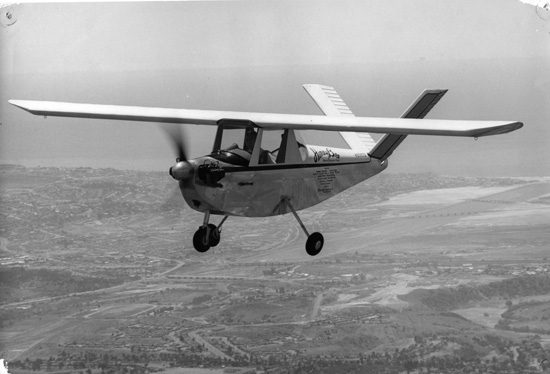
- Honey Bee in flight

General information
- Type: Homebuilt aircraft
- National origin: United States
- Manufacturer: Bee Aviation Associates, Inc.
- Designer: Walter E. Mooney
- Number built: 1

History
- Introduction date: 1952
- First flight: 12 July 1952

The Beecraft Honey Bee was an all-metal V-tailed homebuilt aircraft, that was designed by Walter E. Mooney and first flown on 12 July 1952.

== Design and development ==
The Honey Bee was designed and built by Walter E. Mooney

The Honey Bee is a single seat all metal, high-wing, tricycle gear-equipped aircraft with a V-tail. The stressed skin aircraft is designed to accommodate wing flaps and slots.

The prototype was test flown by William Chana on 12 July 1952 and certified on 17 December 1953.

== Aircraft on display ==
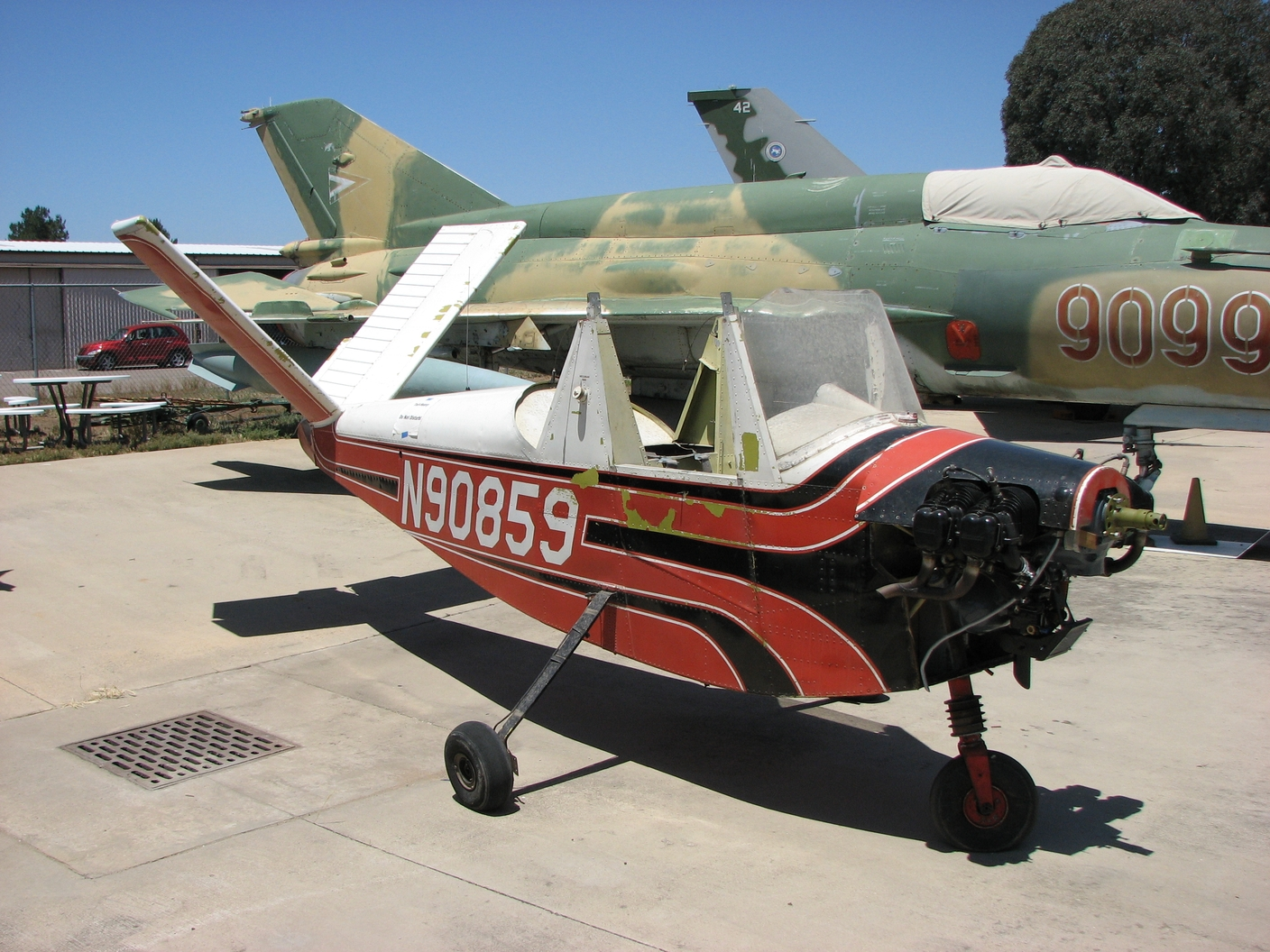
Bee Aviation Honey Bee awaiting restoration at the San Diego Air & Space Museum

The Honey Bee prototype now is on display at the San Diego Air & Space Museum. It is the lone Bee aircraft to survive an arson fire at the museum.

== Specifications (Honey Bee) ==
Data from Air Trails

General characteristics

- Crew: 1
- Length: 17 ft (5.2 m)
- Wingspan: 29 ft (8.8 m)
- Wing area: 95 sq ft (8.8 m^{2})
- Airfoil: NACA 4418
- Empty weight: 550 lb (249 kg)
- Gross weight: 860 lb (390 kg)
- Powerplant: 1 × Continental A-65 , 65 hp (48 kW)
- Propellers: 2-bladed

Performance

- Maximum speed: 100 kn (120 mph, 190 km/h)
- Rate of climb: 1,100 ft/min (5.6 m/s)
- Wing loading: 8.95 lb/sq ft (43.7 kg/m^{2})
- Power/mass: 13.25lb/hp
