= Walter Mooney =

Walter Mooney may refer to:

- Walter Mooney (rugby league) (c. 1892 – c. 1958), English rugby league footballer
- Walter E. Mooney (1925–1990), pilot and model aircraft designer
- Walter D. Mooney (born 1951), USGS research seismologist and geophysicist

== See also ==
- Walter Money (1848–1924), English clergyman and cricketer
