= Beecraft =

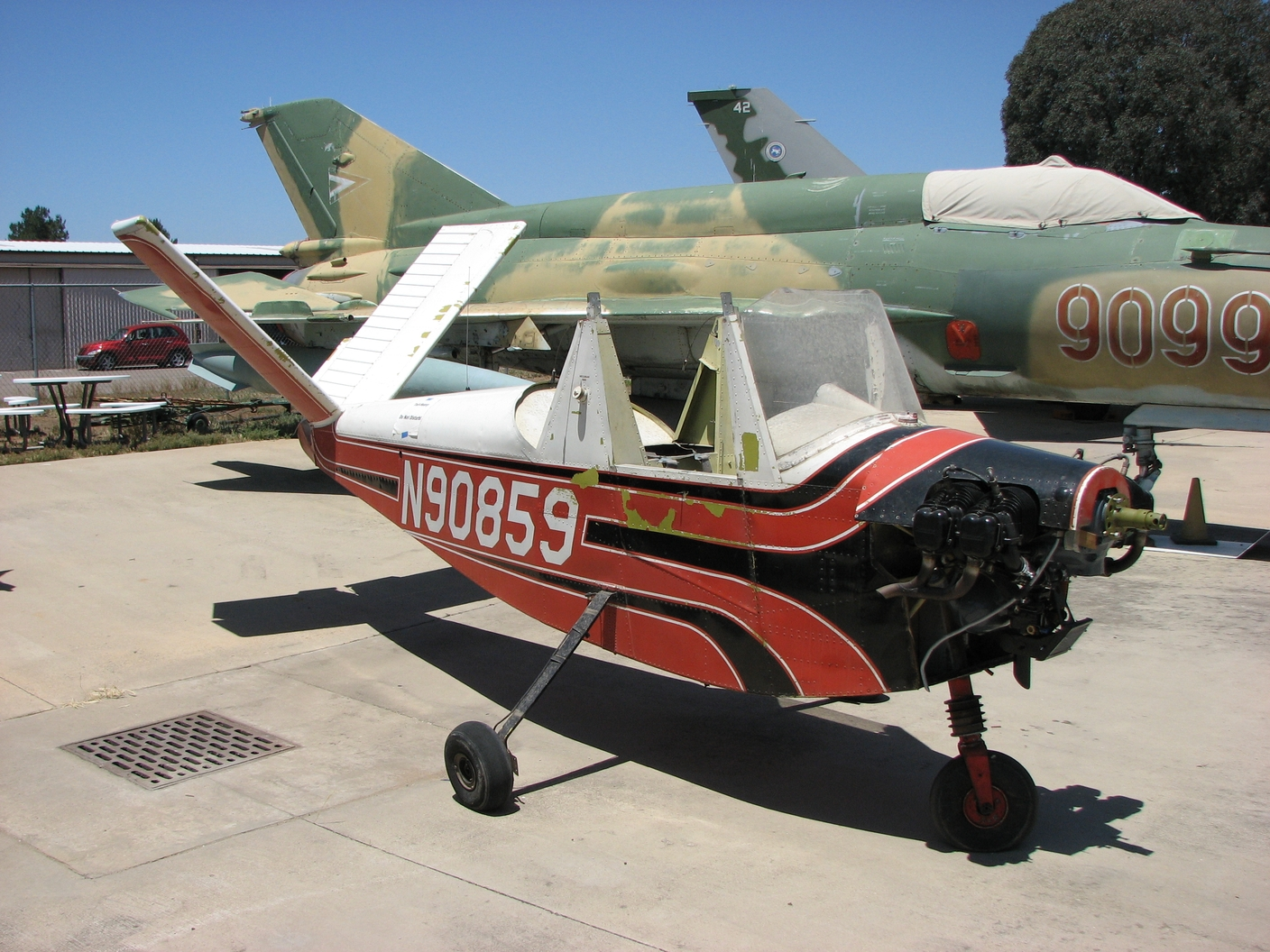
The Honey Bee awaiting restoration at the San Diego Air & Space Museum.

Bee Aviation Associates, Inc. (Beecraft) built three prototype aircraft designed by William F. "Bill" Chana at Montgomery Field in San Diego, California. None of the aircraft went into production.

== History ==
The first aircraft built was the Wee Bee in 1948. The Wee Bee is listed in the Guinness Book of World Records as the world's lightest aircraft, weighing 210 pounds (95 kg) when empty. It had a two-cylinder engine and tricycle landing gear. The pilot flew in a prone position, lying atop the fuselage. The Honey Bee was the second plane, completed in 1952. It had a single seat in an enclosed cabin. The Queen Bee was the last and the largest of the three. It was completed in 1960 and seated four. The Queen Bee and the Honey Bee had V-tails.

== Defunct ==
The Queen Bee and the Wee Bee were destroyed in a fire that destroyed the San Diego Aerospace Museum on February 22, 1978. The Honey Bee escaped the fire as it operated out of Montgomery Field at the time, owned by Walt Mooney. In 2004, the Experimental Aircraft Association donated the Honey Bee to the San Diego Air & Space Museum, which is currently (As of 2007) awaiting restoration at their Gillespie Field annex. According to Aerofiles, two Honey Bees were built based on advertised plans. Because of its historic significance, a second Wee Bee was constructed and is now on display at the new San Diego Air & Space Museum.
