= Jean Kathleen Trainum McKay =

Jean Kathleen (Trainum Smith) McKay
- Born: February 3, 1924; Missouri, US
- Died: August 7, 2016 (aged 92)
- Occupation: Dietitian

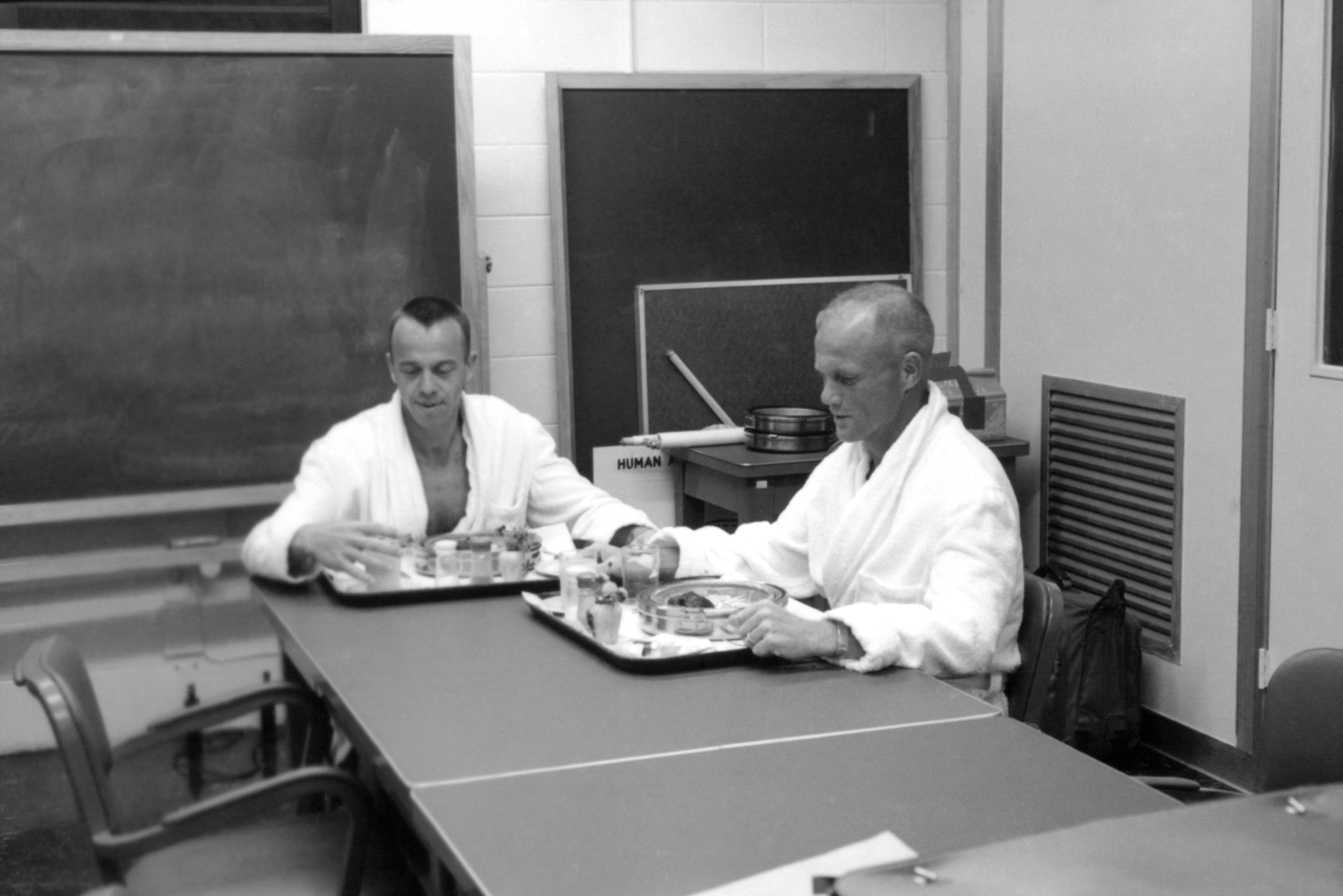
McKay planned the pre-flight meals for the Mercury astronauts.

Jean Kathleen (Trainum) McKay (born February 3, 1924 – November 7, 2016) was a captain in the United States Air Force who served as the staff dietitian in the Office of the Air Force Surgeon General and as the dietitian for the Mercury Project.

== Career ==
Prior to her assignment to Project Mercury in April 1961, McKay was assigned to the Office of the Air Force Surgeon General. At NASA, McKay was responsible for planning specific menus, purchasing the food and supervising preparation and serving, and conducting nutritional analysis and reporting to the National Aeronautics and Space Administration (NASA).

A collection of material related to McKay, including the feeding plans and papers on nutrition that she developed, are held in the National Air and Space Museum Archives.

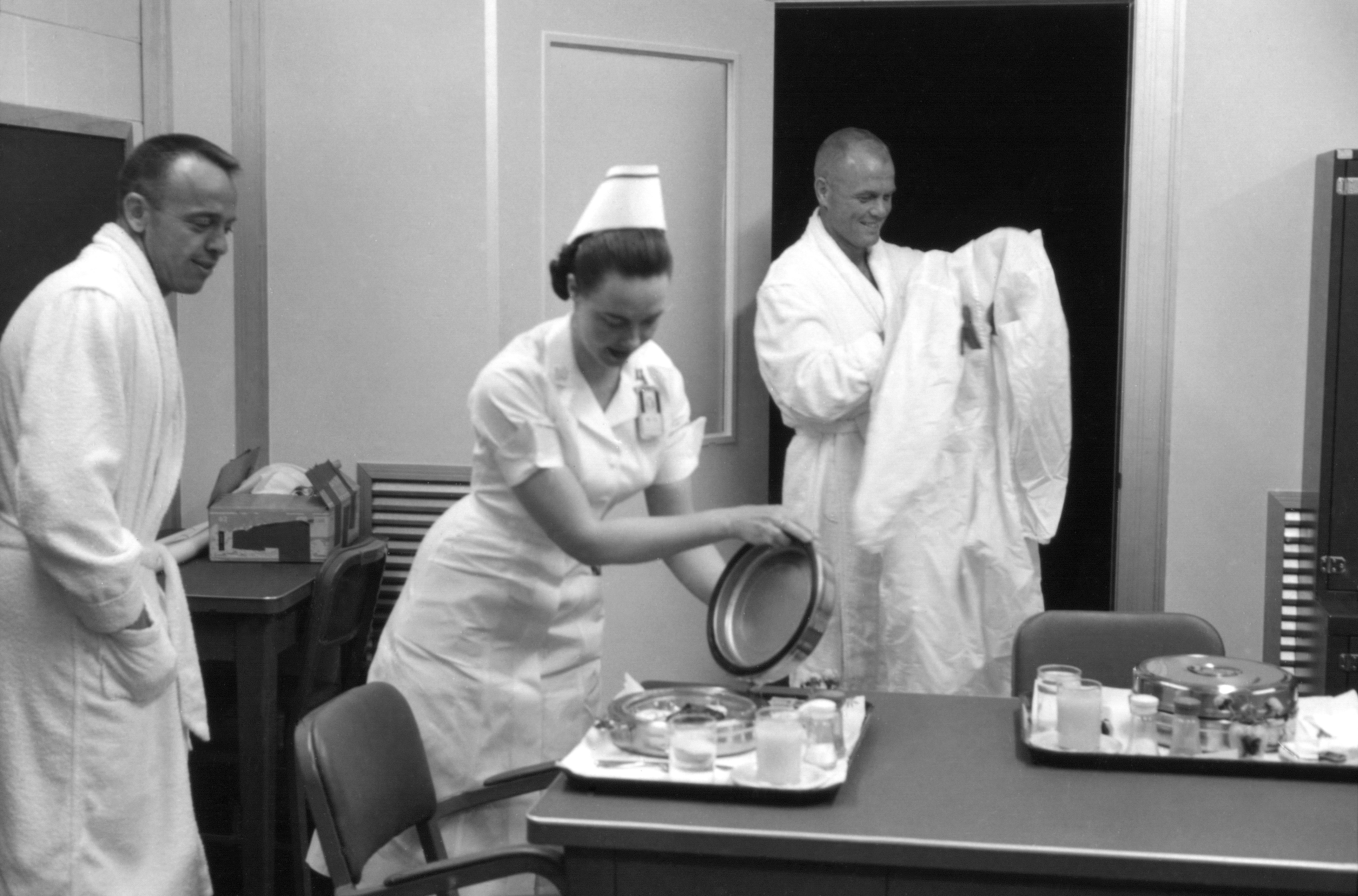
Astronauts Alan Shepard and John Glenn with dietician Jean McKay at breakfast before Shepard's Mercury-Redstone 3 (MR-3) spaceflight.

== Personal life ==
Jean Kathleen Trainum was born in Missouri. She married William McKay, an Air Force pilot from Elgin, Nebraska. In her retirement, until her death in 2016, McKay served as a volunteer docent at the San Diego Air and Space Museum for nearly two decades.
