= Beecraft Queen Bee =

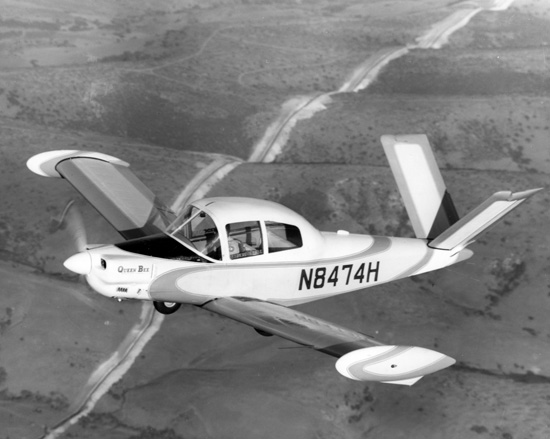
- The Queen Bee in flight

General information
- Type: Four-seat cabin monoplane
- National origin: United States
- Manufacturer: Bee Aviation Associates
- Designer: William S. Chana, Ken S. Coward
- Number built: 1

History
- First flight: 1960

The Beecraft Queen Bee was an American V-tailed four-seat cabin monoplane, designed and built by Bee Aviation Associates (Beecraft).

== Development ==
The Queen Bee was an all-metal cantilever low-wing monoplane powered by a Lycoming O-320-A1A flat-four piston engine. It had a V-tail and an electrically retractable tricycle landing gear. The canopy shared a similar shape to the Ryan Navion. The wings were outfitted with fiberglass tip tanks. A 180 hp Lycoming O-360-A-1-A was planned as an optional engine.

Only a prototype was built and the aircraft did not enter production. The Queen Bee prototype was destroyed when the original San Diego Aerospace Museum burned down in 1978.

== Specifications ==
Data from Jane's All The World's Aircraft 1961–62

General characteristics

- Crew: 1
- Capacity: 3 passengers
- Length: 21 ft 10 in (6.65 m)
- Wingspan: 32 ft 0 in (9.75 m)
- Height: 7 ft 7 in (2.31 m)
- Wing area: 130 sq ft (12 m^{2})
- Empty weight: 1,190 lb (540 kg)
- Max takeoff weight: 2,150 lb (975 kg)
- Powerplant: 1 × Lycoming O-320-A1A flat-four piston engine, 180 hp (130 kW)
- Propellers: 2-bladed Hartzell Model HC-82XG-1B

Performance

- Cruise speed: 155 mph (249 km/h, 135 kn)
- Stall speed: 55 mph (89 km/h, 48 kn)
- Never exceed speed: 193 mph (311 km/h, 168 kn)
- Range: 650 mi (1,050 km, 560 nmi)
- Service ceiling: 15,000 ft (4,600 m)
- Rate of climb: 900 ft/min (4.6 m/s)
