= Beecraft Wee Bee =

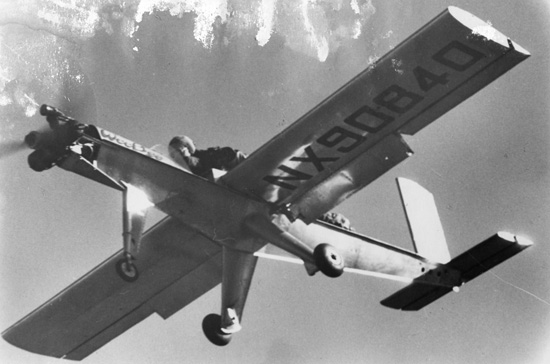
- The Wee Bee in flight

General information
- Type: Experimental sports ultralight aircraft
- National origin: United States
- Manufacturer: Bee Aviation Associates, Inc.
- Number built: 1

History
- First flight: September 26, 1948

The Beecraft Wee Bee was an American ultralight monoplane designed and built by Beecraft. It was described as the world's smallest plane. Later the Starr Bumble Bee II would claim that title.

== Development ==
The Wee Bee was designed by William "Bill" Chana, Kenneth Coward, Karl Montijo and Jim Wilder, who designed the engine. They described it as big enough to carry a man and small enough to be carried by a man.

It was an all-metal cantilever mid-wing monoplane powered by a Kiekhaefer O-45-35 flat-twin piston engine. It had a conventional tail and fixed tricycle landing gear. The unusual feature was that the aircraft lacked any internal room for a pilot who had to fly it lying prone atop the fuselage.

Only a prototype registration NX90840 was built, and the type did not enter production. The prototype was destroyed when the original San Diego Air and Space Museum burned down in 1978. After the fire, a replica was built and is now on display at the new San Diego Air & Space Museum in Balboa Park.

== Specifications ==
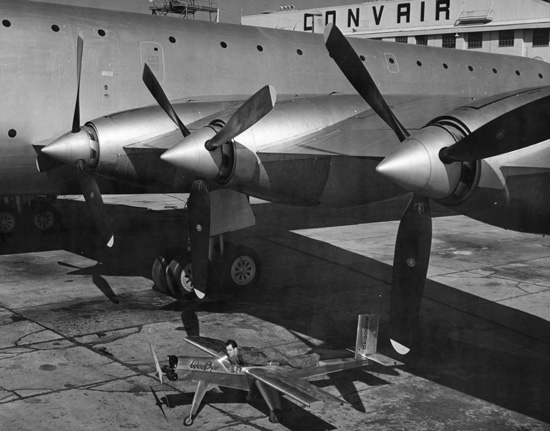
The Wee Bee with the Convair XC-99, the largest piston-engined land-based aircraft.

Data from

General characteristics

- Crew: 1
- Length: 14 ft 2 in (4.32 m)
- Wingspan: 18 ft 0 in (5.49 m)
- Height: 5 ft 0 in (1.52 m)
- Wing area: 44 sq ft (4.1 m^{2})
- Empty weight: 210 lb (95 kg)
- Max takeoff weight: 410 lb (186 kg)
- Powerplant: 1 × Kiekhaefer O-45-35 flat-two piston engine, 30 hp (22 kW)

Performance

- Maximum speed: 82 mph (132 km/h, 71 kn)
- Cruise speed: 75 mph (121 km/h, 65 kn)
- Range: 50 mi (80 km, 43 nmi)
- Service ceiling: 10,000 ft (3,000 m)
