= Ford Building (San Diego) =

- U.S. National Register of Historic Places
- San Diego Historic Landmark
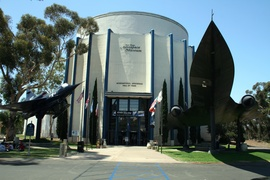
- The Ford Building

- Location within San Diego Location within San Diego County, California Location within California Location within the United States
- Location: Balboa Park, Palisades Area, San Diego, California
- Coordinates: 32°43′34″N 117°9′13″W
- Area: 5 acres (2.0 ha)
- Built: 1935
- Architect: Walter Dorwin Teague
- Architectural style: Moderne
- NRHP reference No.: 73000433
- SDHL No.: 60

Significant dates
- Added to NRHP: April 26, 1973
- Designated SDHL: April 7, 1972

The Ford Building is a Streamline Moderne structure in Balboa Park in San Diego, California, that serves as the home of the San Diego Air & Space Museum. The building was built by the Ford Motor Company for the California Pacific International Exposition, which was held in 1935 and 1936. The Ford Motor Company built a total of five exposition buildings for the world's fairs. This is the last remaining structure.

== Design and construction ==
The building's architect was noted American industrial designer Walter Dorwin Teague. The building was styled to resemble a V8 engine. Overall, it consists of two different-sized circles in the shape of an "8", and in the courtyard of the larger circle, a large fountain is shaped like the Ford V8 logo. The lights in the courtyard ("Pavilion of Flight") are shaped like valves. Along the interior wall of the outer ring is a mural depicting the history of transportation from the times of hunter-gatherers to 1935. The last panel of the mural was left open for the artist to depict his vision of the future of transportation after 1935, which is still visible today.

Initially, Ford wanted the building to be a 200-foot tower, but with the building near the flight path of arriving planes at San Diego International Airport, it was lowered to 90 feet. The size of the building was also decreased to 60,000 square feet from the initially proposed 113,000 square feet.

The site for the building was initially going to be near the Spreckels Organ Pavilion, but was later decided to be built in the Palisades area of the park. Construction took 11 months to complete. The main exhibit hall was a concrete plaster structure framed by steel.

== History ==
Ford was the exposition's principal exhibitor and invested $2 million in the 45,000-square-foot (4,200 m^{2}), 296-foot (90 m) diameter building to showcase its vehicles and other forms of transportation. Throughout the exposition, Ford was assembling autos along the outer rings and used the courtyard area to display the latest-model automobiles. The newly assembled vehicles were rolled out the large doors on the west side. Also, a test track was set up down the hill behind the building where visitors could take one of the model autos for a test drive.

By the end of the exhibition, 2.5 million people had toured the building and its exhibits. Ford donated the building to the city of San Diego at the exhibition's completion in November 1935. The city decided to extend the exhibition into 1936 and renamed the building "The Palace of Transportation" to showcase exhibits related to transportation. When the 1936 exhibition concluded, the building was closed and was not available to the public until 1980, when the San Diego Air & Space Museum opened.

With the building empty, the National Guard temporarily stored in it antiaircraft artillery, trucks, and searchlights. During World War II, Balboa Park was renamed to Camp Kidd, to be used for U.S. Navy training, barracks, and hospital wards. The Ford Building was used for training mechanics in aircraft repair and welding from 1941 to 1946. Convair considered using the building for construction of B-24 Liberators until they realized the building was too small to fit the plane's extensive wingspan.

From the late 1940s to the 1960s, the building was used for storage for both the Starlight Civic Opera and San Diego's Park and Recreation department. By this point the building was in poor shape and was recommended by a 1960 commission to be demolished. In the late 1960s, the building was used a temporary studio space for the Chicano artist group Los Toltecas en Azatlán. In 1973, several San Diego groups worked to get the building listed on the National Register of Historic Places, saving it from being destroyed.

== The Studio of Los Toltecas en Aztlán ==
In 1968, the San Diego Parks and Recreation Department gave Chicano artist Salvador Roberto Torres permission to use the then-abandoned Ford Building as a studio for six months. Torres eventually invited other Chicano artists to the building and they eventually formed Los Toltecas en Azatlán. In 1970, Los Toltecas en Azatlán created a proposal to create El Centro Cultural de la Raza in an effort to keep the building as a space for cultural production. The proposal was eventually denied by the San Diego city government, but Los Toltecas en Azatlán decided to remain and occupy the building until 1971, when the city agreed on another space for the proposed Chicano cultural center within Balboa Park.

== San Diego Air & Space Museum ==
During the process of adding the building to the National Register, the San Diego City Council recommended it be used for a new home to the San Diego Aerospace Museum, now known as the San Diego Air & Space Museum. After its earlier location in the former Electric Building was burned down in a fire in 1978, the Ford Building was remodeled to house the museum at a cost of $8 million and opened on June 28, 1980. The museum uses the Ford-themed courtyard for weddings, balls, parties, and other occasions.

== See also ==
- Ford Building (Detroit)
