= Walter D. Mooney =

Research seismologist and geophysicist

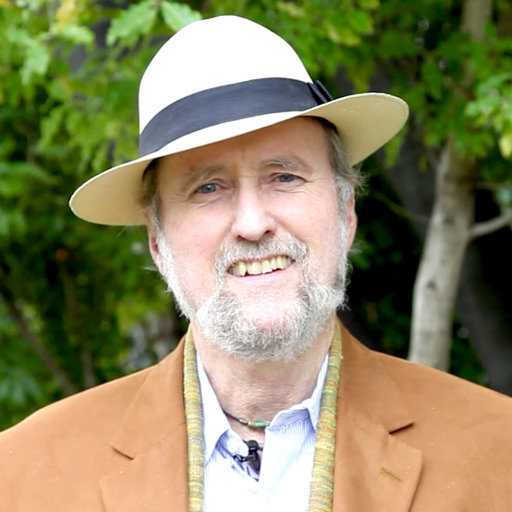
- Walter Mooney, 2019
- Born: November 17, 1951 (age 74); Long Island, New York, U.S.
- Education: Cornell University; University of Wisconsin-Madison
- Awards: George P. Woollard Award
- Scientific career
- Workplaces: United States Geological Survey; University of Kiel; Stanford University; Pierre et Marie Curie University
- Thesis: Seismic refraction studies of the Western Cordillera, Colombia and an East Pacific-Caribbean Ridge during the Jurassic and Cretaceous and the evolution of western Colombia (1979)

Walter D. Mooney (born November 17, 1951) is a research seismologist and geophysicist at the United States Geological Survey (USGS), Menlo Park, California (1978–present). He was Chief of the USGS Branch of Seismology from 1994 to 1997.

== Early life and education ==
Mooney attended Cornell University from 1969 to 1973 for his B.S in physics. In 1976, he spent 6 months as a Graduate Fellow in Karlsruhe University, Germany. He went on to complete his Ph.D. on the Deep Structure of the South American Andes in 1979 at the University of Wisconsin-Madison.

== Research ==
Mooney's major interest is global Earth crustal structure and tectonics, with a focus on the continental lithosphere. Mooney has led fieldwork throughout North and South America. According to Mooney his international research collaborations have "provided both a rich basis for my science, and a broad cultural understanding.' He has co-authored more than 170 scientific papers.

Mooney has also been a visiting professor of geophysics in many different universities over the years including, Stanford University (1984–2008; 2014–present), Pierre et Marie Curie University, France (1998) and University of Kiel, Germany (1985).

With Claus Prodehl of Universität Karlsuhe, Germany, Mooney wrote Exploring the Earth's Crust – History and Results of Controlled-Source Seismology).

Since 2011, he has been collaborating with the Saudi Geological Survey in a study of the crustal and upper mantle structure beneath western Saudi Arabia using data from the SGS broadband seismic network.

== Awards and professional associations ==
Mooney is considered a world leader in geophysical studies of the Earth's crust and upper mantle. In 1995, he was awarded the Geological Society of America's (GSA) George P. Woollard Award. This award is given annually to recognize a person who has made outstanding contributions to geology using geophysical methods. as well as being a Fellow of the American Geophysical Union (AGU), the Royal Astronomical Society and the Geological Society of London. He received the Gold Medal Award in 2002 from the Indian Geophysical Union and was elected Foreign Fellow by the European Academy in 2004.

== Selected publications ==
- Mooney, W.D., and Brocher, T.M., (1987), Coincident seismic reflection/refraction studies of the continental lithosphere: a global review, Geophysical Journal International, 89(1), 1–6.
- Mooney, W.D., and Meissner, R., (1992), Multi-genetic origin of crustal reflectivity: a review of seismic reflection profiling of the continental lower crust and Moho, Continental Lower Crust: Elsevier Amsterdam, 23, 45–79.
- Christensen, N.I and Mooney, W.D., (1995), Seismic Velocity Structure and Composition of the Continental Crust: A Global View, J. Geophys. Res., 100, 9761–9788.
- Mooney, W.D., Laske, G., Masters, T.G., (1998), CRUST 5.1: A global crustal model at 5 degrees x 5 degrees, J. Geophys. Res., 103, 727–747.
- Artemieva, I.M., and Mooney, W.D., (2001), Thermal thickness and evolution of Precambrian lithosphere: a global study, J. Geophys. Res., 106, 16,387–16,414.
- Mooney, W.D. and Schulte, S., (2002), Earthquakes in continental interiors: A review of their possible causes, APEC Symposium on confronting urban earthquakes, Academica Sinica, 54, 53–60.
- Bahan, S. and Mooney, W.D., (2008), First-hand observations of the M=7.9 Wenchuan, China earthquake, Earth Magazine, 17–21.
- Hickman, S.H., Hsieh, P.A., Mooney, W.D., Enomoto, C., Nelson, P., Mayer, L., Weber, T., Moran, K., Flemings, P., McNutt, M., (2010), Scientific Basis for Safely Shutting in the Macondo Well Following the April 20, 2010, Deepwater Horizon Blowout, Proc. National Academy of Sciences 109(50), 20,268–20,273.
- Prodehl, C. and Mooney, W.D., (2012), Exploring the Earth's Crust: History and Results of Controlled-Source Seismology, Geological Soc. America Memoir 208, 764pp. (with supplement DVD).
- Pollitz, F.F. and Mooney, W.D., (2013), Seismic Structure of the Central US crust and shallow upper mantle: Uniqueness of the Reelfoot Rift, Earth and Planetary Science Letters, online July 2013.
