= Walter E. Mooney =

American aircraft engineer and designer

Walter E. Mooney (June 6, 1925 – March 1, 1990) was an MIT-educated engineer, aircraft designer, pilot and model aircraft designer who lived in San Diego, California. He was known professionally for his work in the aerospace industry on full scale aircraft efforts for the Convair division of General Dynamics, but was also a prolific designer of model aircraft, with plans and articles published in magazines including Model Airplane News, Boys' Life, Aero Modeller, and Model Builder. He was once featured as a daredevil glider pilot on the 1973 TV series Thrill Seekers. Mooney became particularly associated with Peanut Scale model aircraft, with model-aircraft writer Bill Hannan describing him as "perhaps the most prolific Peanut producer and proponent".

In 1974, Burt Raynes, chairman of Rohr Industries, assigned Mooney the job of developing an advanced light aircraft intended to compete in the general-aviation market, and particularly to compete against the Cessna 172. Mooney served as designer and project manager of the resulting Rohr Two-175. Rohr built two flying prototypes and a static-test airframe, with one prototype accumulating 23 flight hours before the project was discontinued before being put in production.

The Flying Aces model club of Washington has held a Walt Mooney Memorial model airplane meet named in his honor.

== Early life and education ==
Born in northern California, Mooney became interested in aviation and model aircraft at an early age. After serving in the United States military during World War II, he attended college under the G.I. Bill, receiving a degree in aeronautical engineering from the Massachusetts Institute of Technology. While attending college, he met and married his wife, Carole, who also became involved in model aviation.

== Examples of work ==
- Piper PA 25 Pawnee, with Plan, by Walter Mooney Model Airplane News, December 1965, Vol. 72, No. 6
- List of Mooney Plans
- Walt Mooney on FF - Scale from January 1974 American Aircraft Modeler
