= San Diego Air & Space Museum =

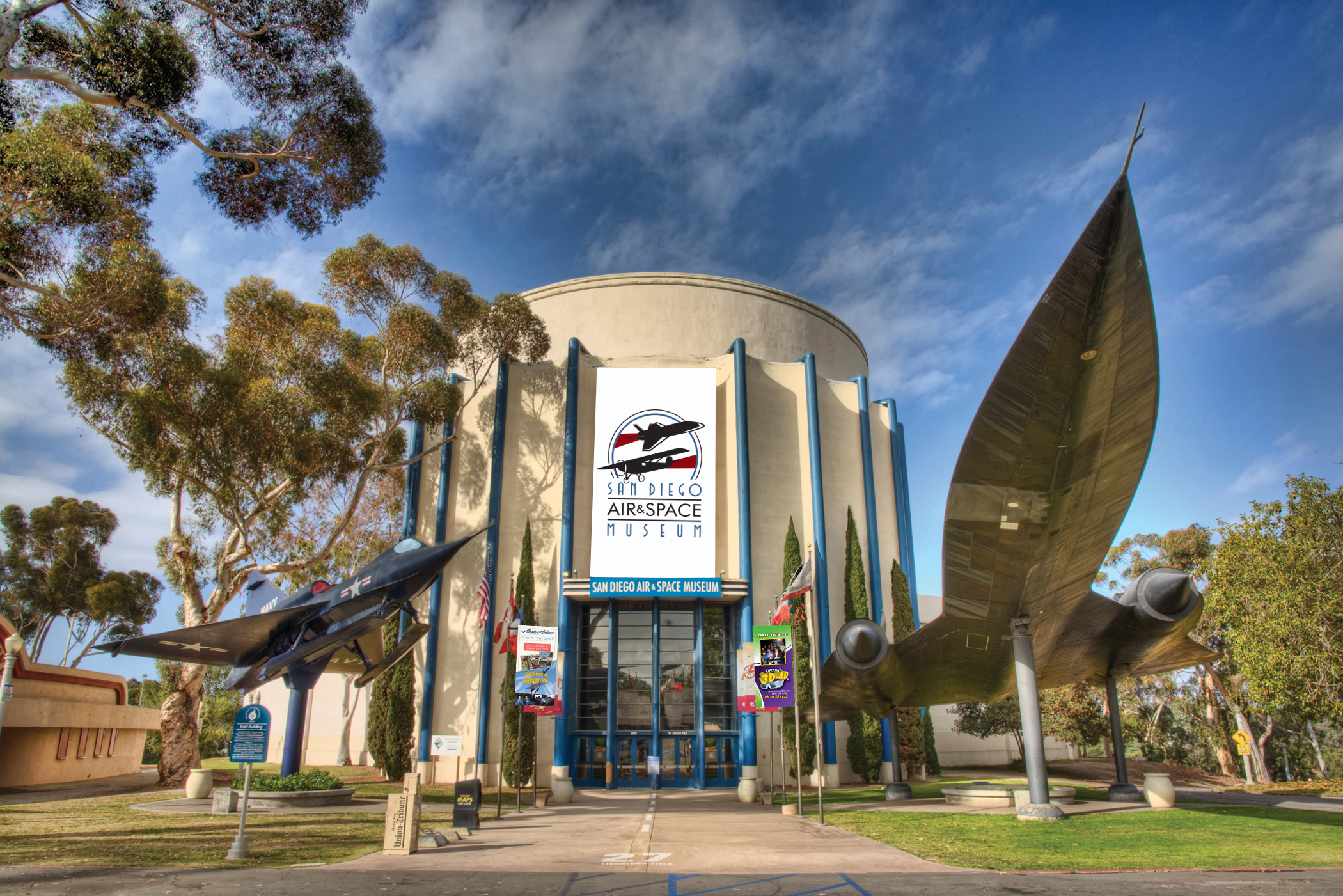
- Museum entrance in 2009, with a Convair YF2Y-1 Seadart on the left and a Lockheed A-12 Oxcart on the right.

- Location within San Diego Location within California Location within the United States
- Former name: San Diego Aerospace Museum
- Established: October 12, 1961; 65 years ago
- Location: Ford Building; 2001 Pan American Plaza; San Diego, California, US
- Coordinates: 32.7262°N 117.1543°W
- Type: Aerospace museum
- Accreditation: American Alliance of Museums; Smithsonian Affiliate
- Key holdings: Apollo 9 Command Module; Blue Angels F/A-18A Hornet; General Atomics RQ-1K Predator; Lockheed A-12 Oxcart; Supermarine Spitfire Mk XVI
- Collections: The Pioneer Era; World War I; Golden Age of Aviation; World War II; Space Age
- Visitors: 270,000 (FY 2017)
- President: James G. Kidrick
- Chairperson: Mark Larson
- Curator: Terry Brennan
- Public transit access: MTS Bus; Bus 7, Rapid 215
- Parking: On site (free)
- Website: sandiegoairandspace.org
- Ford Building
- U.S. National Register of Historic Places
- San Diego Historic Landmark
- Built: 1935; 91 years ago
- NRHP reference No.: 73000433
- SDHL No.: 60

Significant dates
- Added to NRHP: April 26, 1973
- Designated SDHL: April 7, 1972

The San Diego Air & Space Museum (SDASM) is an aviation and space exploration museum in San Diego, California. It is located in Balboa Park and is housed in the former Ford Building, which is listed on the US National Register of Historic Places. The museum was established by articles of incorporation on October 12, 1961, and opened to the public on February 15, 1963.

== History ==
The museum was established on October 12, 1961, as the San Diego Aerospace Museum. The museum was first opened to the public on February 15, 1963, in the Food and Beverage Building, which had been built in 1915 for the Panama–California Exposition. In 1965 the museum was moved to the larger Electrical Building.

On February 22, 1978, the Electrical Building and the museum were destroyed in an arson fire. Several one-of-a-kind aircraft were destroyed, including the Beecraft Wee Bee, the world's lightest aircraft, and her sister's craft the Queen Bee. A reproduction of the Spirit of St. Louis, built-in 1967 by some of the same people who built the original, was also destroyed, along with more than 50 other aircraft, an extensive collection of artifacts and archives, and the International Aerospace Hall of Fame. Owen Clarke, the museum's executive director, said of the $4 million in losses, "This is unbelievably tragic. When you've spent that length of time acquiring history, building something up to where it had international prestige, then see it all disappear in a couple of hours, what else can it be?"

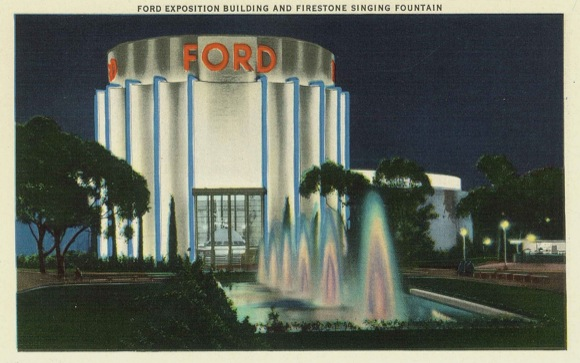
Entrance of the Ford Building with Firestone Singing Fountains, 1935.

Before the fire, plans had already been underway to move the museum to the larger Ford Building, also in Balboa Park, which had been built for the 1935–36 California Pacific International Exposition. Even though several important historic aircraft were lost in the fire, much of the collection on display was dated or insignificant. The museum was already accumulating new aircraft that were in storage awaiting space in the new building and so was spared from the fire. In addition, the community rallied, raising funds and donating items from private collections. The museum reopened, with a smaller but growing collection, in its current home in the former Ford Building on June 28, 1980. A new reproduction of the Spirit of St. Louis was built for the new museum. Because of its historical significance, a reproduction of the Wee Bee was also built.

In 2005, the museum became affiliated with the Smithsonian Institution. It is one of only ten aerospace museums in the country to have such an affiliation and one of only two affiliated museums in San Diego.

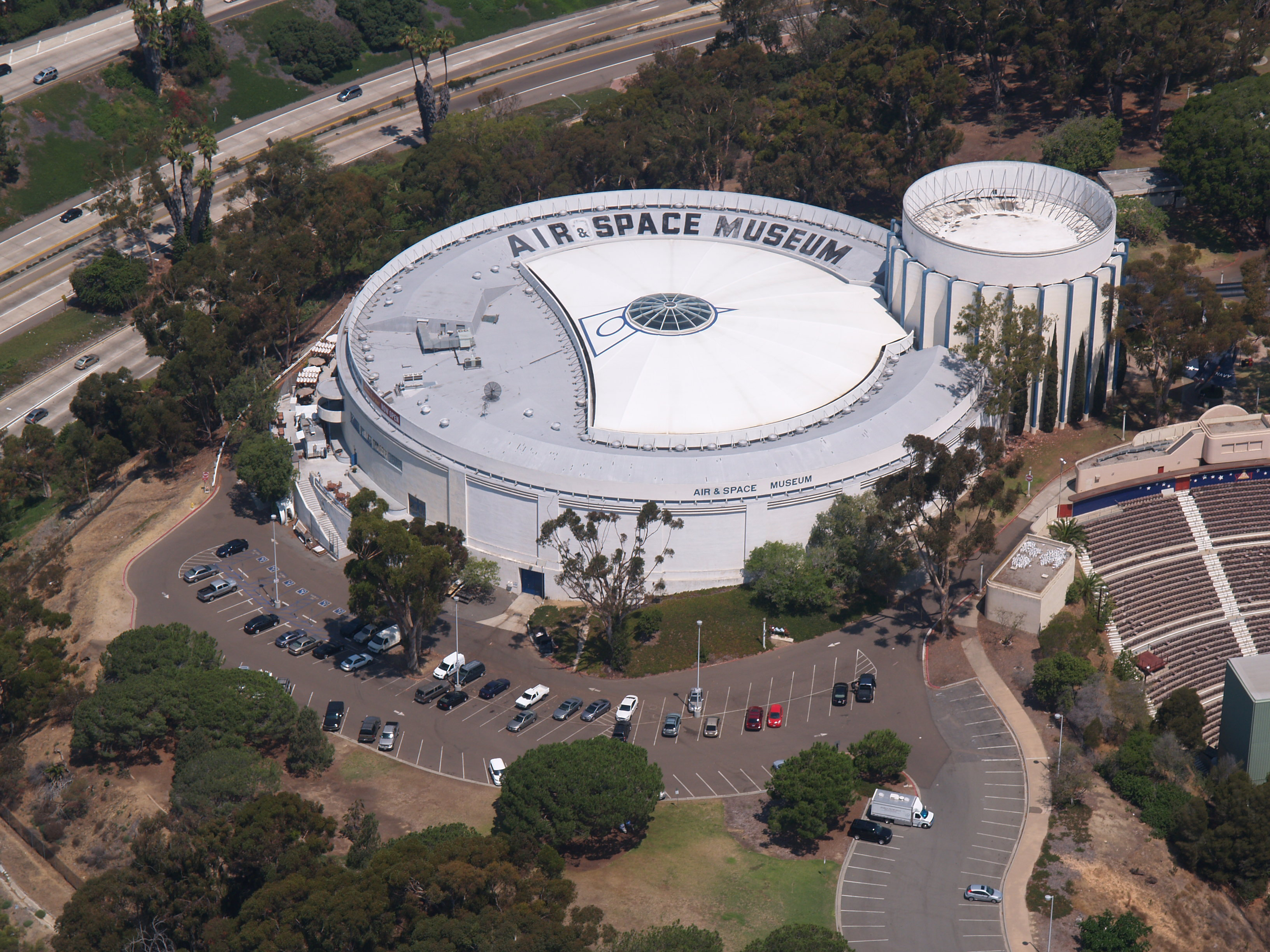
The San Diego Air and Space Museum as seen from overhead in 2013.

== Exhibits ==
The museum is divided into many galleries with exhibits emphasizing the contributions San Diego has made to aviation. Sections include the Theodore Gildred Rotunda, Special Exhibit area, World War I Gallery, Golden Age of Flight Gallery, World War II Gallery, Modern Jet & Space Age Gallery, and the Edwin D. McKellar Pavilion of Flight. Admission is required and there is an additional cost to see the Special Exhibit.

The restoration shop on site is available for tours when work is being done.

=== Theodore Gildred Rotunda ===
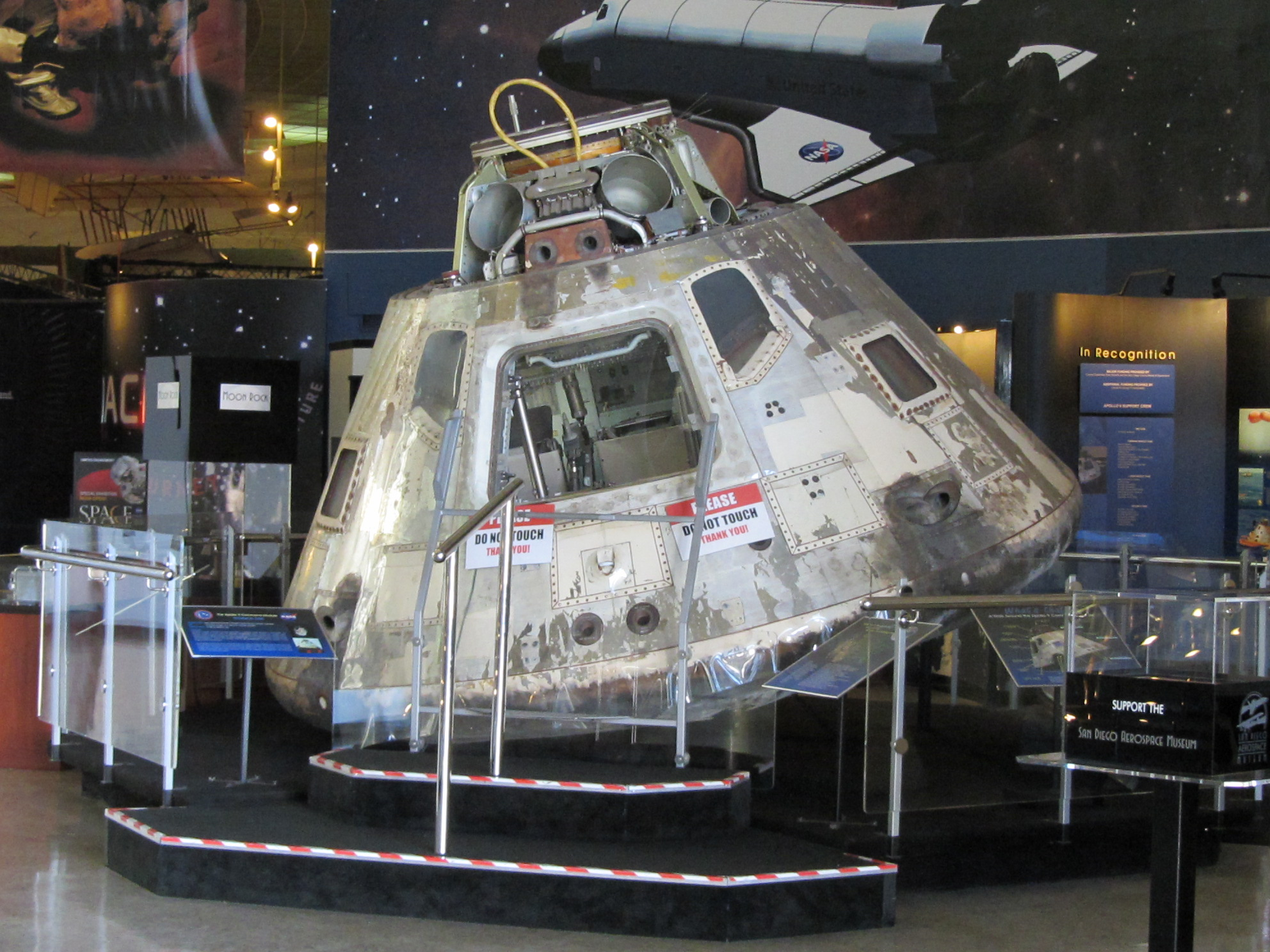
The Apollo 9 Command Module Gumdrop flown in 1969 by James McDivitt, David Scott, and Rusty Schweickart in preparation of the first lunar landing missions

In addition to the Apollo 9 Command Module Gumdrop, the main entrance to the museum contains examples of aircraft from local San Diego companies. It also features the different types of exhibits throughout the museum. This includes originals, like the Montgomery 1911 Evergreen glider, models, like the 1/2 scale model of the Northrop Grumman Global Hawk, flyable reproductions, like the Curtiss A-1 Triad amphibious aircraft, replicas, like the Ryan Airlines NYP (aka Spirit of St. Louis).

=== Special exhibits ===
In addition to the changing special exhibits at the front of the museum, there are several early aviation exhibits hanging from the ceiling. Visitors are encouraged to look up while making their way through the special exhibit. Guests who do not pay to see the special exhibit pass through the International Air & Space Hall of Fame hallway, where portraits of aviation pioneers are displayed. Also along this hallway are exhibits about Jacqueline "Jackie" Cochran and the Women Airforce Service Pilots.

Hanging above this area are exhibits of the Leonardo da Vinci Ornithopter (mock-up), Cayley Glider (reproduction), Lilienthal Glider (reproduction), Chanute Glider (reproduction), 1901 Wright Glider (reproduction), 1902 Wright Glider (reproduction), Deperdussin 1911 Type Militaire, Beachey "Little Looper" (reproduction), and the Vin Fiz Flyer (reproduction).

The San Diego Air and Space Museum is currently showcasing an interactive exhibition dedicated to Leonardo Da Vinci’s groundbreaking inventions. The display features some of his most notable creations, including various flying machines, a life-sized hang glider, and Da Vinci’s own notes detailing his inventive process. Running through January 4, 2026, at 2001 Pan America Plaza, the exhibition aims to shed light on the often-overlooked story of Da Vinci's attempt at flight in 1506. His inventions were remarkably ahead of their time, introducing concepts like “wing warping,” a technology later attributed to the Wright brothers. Da Vinci’s extensive knowledge and visionary ideas anticipated many modern advancements, such as drones, parachutes, and helicopters.

The museum also has the California lunar sample displays.

=== World War I Gallery ===
In addition to the boardwalk and era-style tent similar to those used by the Lafayette Escadrille, the gallery has reproductions of an Albatros D.Va, a Fokker Dr.I and Fokker E.III Eindecker, and authentic examples of a SPAD S.VII.c.1 and Nieuport 28. Among the many displays is a model of the synchronization gear first developed for the Fokker Eindecker. With the press of a button, guests can see how the propeller and rotary engine would move and coordinate the trigger action so pilots would not shoot off their own propellers in combat.

=== Golden Age of Flight Gallery ===
Along the long back stretch of this gallery are many aircraft, both on the deck and hanging from the ceiling. Aircraft in this section include a Lincoln Standard J-1, Consolidated PT-1 Trusty, Aeronca C-3 Collegian, Ryan M-1 (replica), Lockheed Vega (replica made for the 2009 movie Amelia (film)) Fleet Model 2, Gee Bee R-1 (reproduction), Bowlus SP-1 Paperwing (reproduction), Ryan B-5 Brougham, Ryan STA, Piper J-3 Cub, and Pitts Special.

The museum also has several aircraft engines on display. This gallery contains a Curtiss OX-5, Aeronca E-107, Liberty L-12, Wright J-3 Whirlwind, Curtiss V-1570 Conqueror, Jacobs L-4MB (cutaway), Menasco A-4, and Continental A-40.

The Curtiss JN-4D "Jenny" was returned to the restoration shop to reskin the wings but has since been returned to the gallery.

Access to the Edwin D. McKeller Pavilion of Flight is from this portion of the museum. This is also where the Education Center is, which hosts monthly Family Day activities. Guests will also locate the restrooms for the museum in this section of the building. On some days, lunch is available on the outer patio outside of this portion of the museum.

There is an exhibit of the Pacific Southwest Airlines (PSA), also known as the Poor Sailor's Airline, in the museum. A replica of the airline's first ticket office has displays about the airline with a smile and includes stewardess uniforms from the 1950s through the 1980s, including the hot pants worn during the 1970s.

PSA Flight 182, registration N533PS, a Boeing 727-214 commercial airliner collided with a private Cessna 172 over San Diego on September 25, 1978. A memorial plaque honoring those who died on Flight 182 and the ground is located at the museum, near the Theodore Gildred Flight Rotunda. On the 20th anniversary of the tragedy, a tree was planted next to the North Park branch library, and a memorial plaque was dedicated to those who died.

=== World War II Gallery ===
The latest addition to the museum is a replica Horten Ho 229 flying wing, which was put on display in July 2009. This was donated to the museum's permanent collection by Northrop Grumman (owners of Ryan Aeronautical) following radar testing at the same test site, which was used to compare the Horten's radar cross-section to the Northrop B-2 Spirit stealth bomber. Details of the work on the model and the history of the aircraft were featured on the National Geographic Channel's documentary Hitler's Stealth Fighter.

Other aircraft in this portion of the museum include a Stearman N2S-3 Kaydet, North American P-51D Mustang, Messerschmitt Bf 109G-14 (mock-up), and Supermarine Spitfire Mk.XVI. A Douglas C-47 Skytrain (DC-3) Nose and Cockpit section loaned by the National Air and Space Museum was previously on display in this gallery.

This section of the museum is also where a mock-up of the USS Yorktown (CV-10) was built. This Essex Class aircraft carrier has many of the Navy aircraft on display, including a Douglas SBD-4 Dauntless, Grumman F6F-3 Hellcat, and Grumman F4F-4 Wildcat. Racing just feet over the deck, guests will see a Mitsubishi A6M7 Zero-sen.

Throughout the gallery are many of the aircraft engines which were used during this period. On display are a Junkers Jumo 004B-1, Allison V-1710-39, Walter RI-202B, Rolls-Royce Merlin 62, Pratt & Whitney R-2800, Pratt & Whitney R-1830-17, Wright R-1820 Cyclone, Ranger 6-440C-2, and Ranger SGV-770C-1.

=== Modern Jet and Space Age Gallery ===
This gallery contains a Douglas A-4B Skyhawk, F/A-18A Hornet "Blue Angel 1", Gemini spacecraft (replica), an Apollo Command and Service Module mock-up, and flight vehicles, like the Ryan Firebee and General Atomics MQ-1 Predator.

At the far end of the gallery is the Boeing GPS-12 Satellite. This was an operational ground spare. Launched into space for the original GPS constellation were 23 operational spacecraft and two on-orbit spares. Several spares were flight-ready on the ground in case there were malfunctions in orbit, these spacecraft could be launched as replacements. When the next generation of spacecraft was developed, the ground spares were no longer needed, and one was donated to the museum. On display is a flight-ready GPS satellite.

Along the inside wall of this gallery is the cockpit canopy of the North American X-15. This supersonic rocket plane first flew on June 8, 1959, with Scott Crossfield at the controls. Also in the display case near the canopy is Crossfield's flight suit from the X-15 and the air conditioning case used by Neil Armstrong when he was an X-15 pilot. Eight of the X-15 pilots flew into space (above 60 miles [97 km]) to earn their astronaut wings.

The many astronauts who grew up and lived in the San Diego area include Wally Schirra, the only astronaut to command missions in Mercury, Gemini, and Apollo.

=== Edwin D. McKellar Pavilion of Flight ===
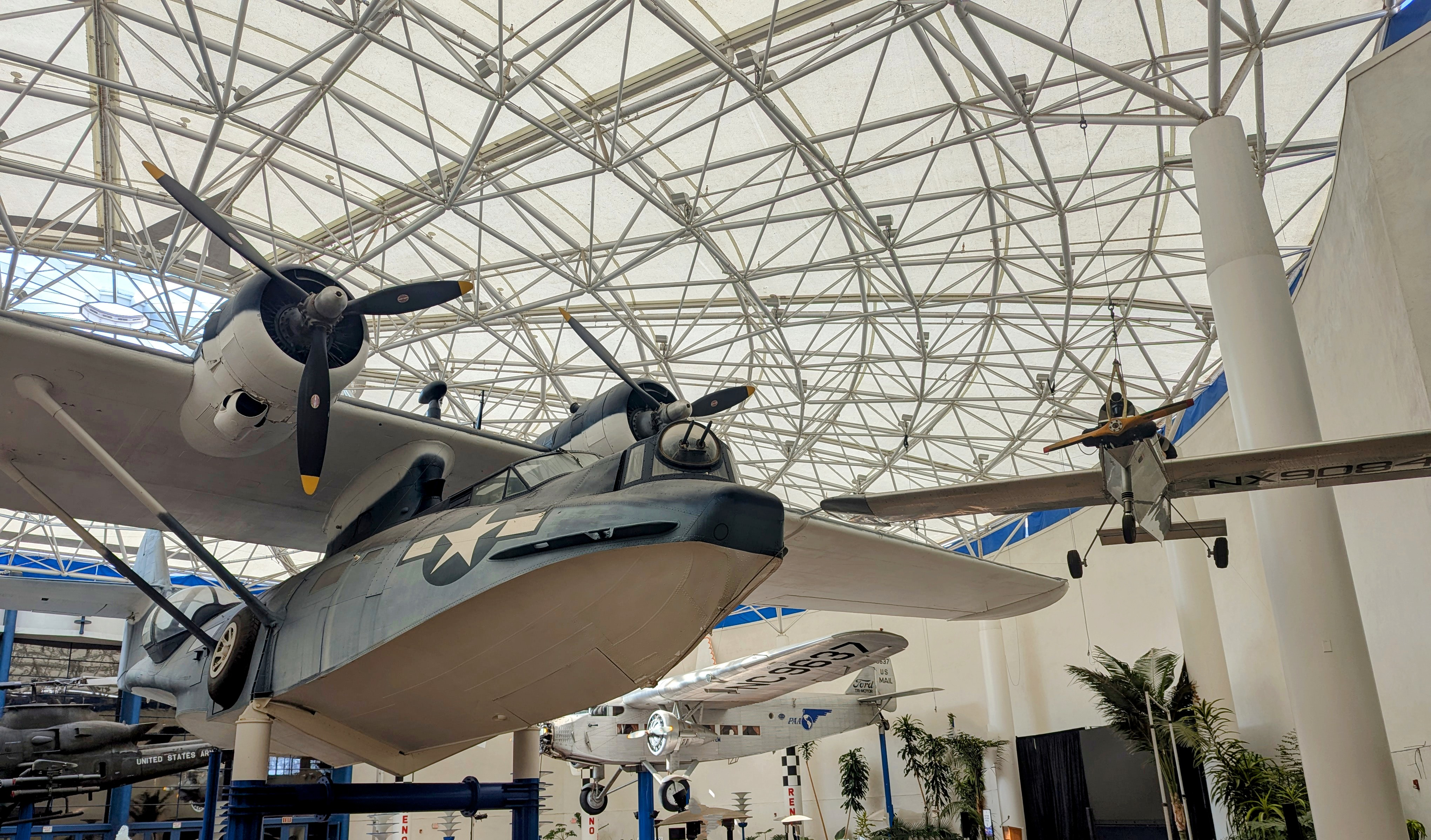
View of Consolidated PBY Catalina and Wee Bee in the Edwin D. McKellar Pavilion of Flight, 2025.

The original courtyard of the Ford Building was used as a showroom during the 1935 California Pacific International Exposition. Now, it houses many of the larger aircraft in the museum's collection. These aircraft include the Consolidated PBY-5A Catalina, Mikoyan-Gurevich MiG-17, Bell AH-1E Cobra, and Ford 5-AT-B Trimotor. It also includes a replica of the Beecraft Wee Bee several racing aircraft, and two Ford cars on loan from the San Diego Automotive Museum.

The McDonnell Douglas F-4J/S Phantom II on display in the pavilion was the aircraft flown by Duke Cunningham and William P. Driscoll in Vietnam from the USS Constellation (CV-64). Cunningham was the first ace to get all of his kills with missiles. The aircraft here has both radar guided Sparrow missiles along the belly and infrared heat-seeking Sidewinder missiles loaded on the wings.

The museum also rents the pavilion for special events, from lectures to dinners. Upon request, volunteer museum docents can be available to provide additional information about the exhibits during these events.

=== Exhibits Coming Soon ===
While the San Diego Air & Space Museum may have a variety of aviation vehicles on display, a few of these planes are not the original planes, and are only replicas. The museum stores the original planes in a basement, where they are being rebuilt. In the future, small tour groups may be allowed to tour the basement portion of the museum to view the workshop that is rebuilding the planes, as well as the original planes that the museum has.

=== Front of Museum ===
On display outside the museum are a Lockheed A-12 and a Convair YF2Y-1 Sea Dart.

=== Gillespie Field Annex ===
In addition to the main facility at Balboa Park, the museum also has an annex at Gillespie Field, El Cajon. The Annex featured additional display space for more aircraft and restoration facilities. Some of the featured aircraft and spacecraft here include:

- Convair F-102A Delta Dagger
- Mikoyan-Gurevich MiG-15bis
- Bleriot XI (reproduction)
- Grumman F-14 Tomcat
- Lockheed P-2 Neptune
- Douglas A2D Skyshark
- General Dynamics F-16 Fighting Falcon
- Bell UH-1 Iroquois
- Ryan X-13 Vertijet
- Hawker Siddeley AV-8A Harrier
- Boeing FB-5 Hawk (reproduction)
- Ryan PT-22 Recruit
- WACO YKS-7
- Sikorsky SH-60 Seahawk
- SM-65 Atlas
- Lockheed S-3 Viking
- North American F-86F Sabre
- Mikoyan-Gurevich MiG-21bis

An F-14 Tomcat from the annex would be used in ground scenes during the filming of Top Gun: Maverick.

== Collection ==
It contains many original and reproductions of historic aircraft and spacecraft, including:

- Lockheed A-12 Oxcart
- Bowlus SP-1 Paper Wing – replica
- Bowlus BA-100 Baby Albatross
- Convair YF2Y-1 Sea Dart
- Apollo 9 command module Gumdrop
- Mercury spacecraft mock-up (Sigma 7)
- Bell X-1 mock-up
- Spirit of St. Louis replica (Spirit 3 was built after the 1978 fire)
- Curtiss A-1 Triad
- Curtiss B-1 Robin
- Montgomery 1911 Evergreen glider
- General Atomics MQ-1 Predator UAV (tail number 0018)
- MQ-8B Fire Scout
- Ryan Firebee
- Gilbert DG-1 Miss B Haven
- Modified Pitts-type biplane Sundancer
- Robinson R44
- RL10 rocket engine
- Northrop Grumman RQ-4 Global Hawk (1/2 scale model)
- 1902 Wright Glider (reproduction)
- Wright Flyer (reproduction, currently not on display)
- Vin Fiz Flyer (reproduction)
- Ford 5-AT-B Trimotor
- Supermarine Spitfire LF Mk.XVIe
- North American P-51D Mustang
- SPAD S.VII.c.1
- Sopwith Pup – reproduction
- Nieuport 28
- Nieuport 11 – reproduction
- Curtiss JN-4D Jenny
- North American F-86 Sabre (at Gillespie Field annex)
- Mitsubishi A6M7 Model 63 Zero
- Grumman F-14 Tomcat (at Gillespie Field annex)
- Mikoyan-Gurevich MiG-17 (It is in fact a Chinese Shenyang J-5.)
- McDonnell Douglas F-4S Phantom II
- Bell AH-1E Cobra
- PBY-5A Catalina
- Horten Ho 229 (model)
- P-26 Peashooter (currently on display)
- Vought F4U-7 Corsair (currently on display)

SDASM promotes itself as one of the largest aviation museums in the nation, containing the third-largest collection of archives and library. SDASM has two restoration facilities, one on site, and the other located at Gillespie Field. The Gillespie Field Annex is open to the public with numerous aircraft on display outdoors, a Convair SM-65 Atlas ICBM, museum model shop, and a restoration shop. The museum's library contains an extensive collection of aircraft books and historic photographs of aircraft and aircraft manufacturing.

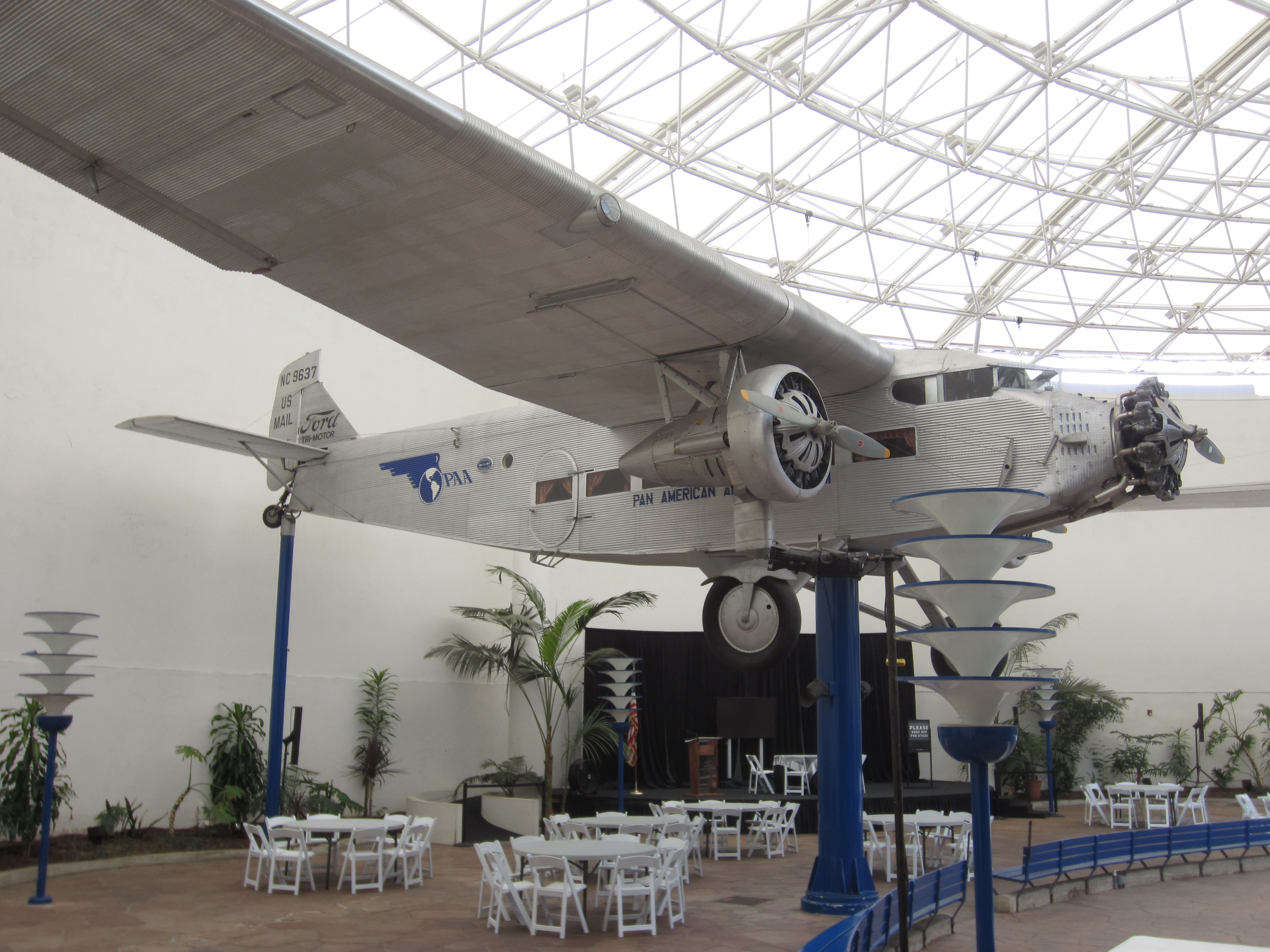

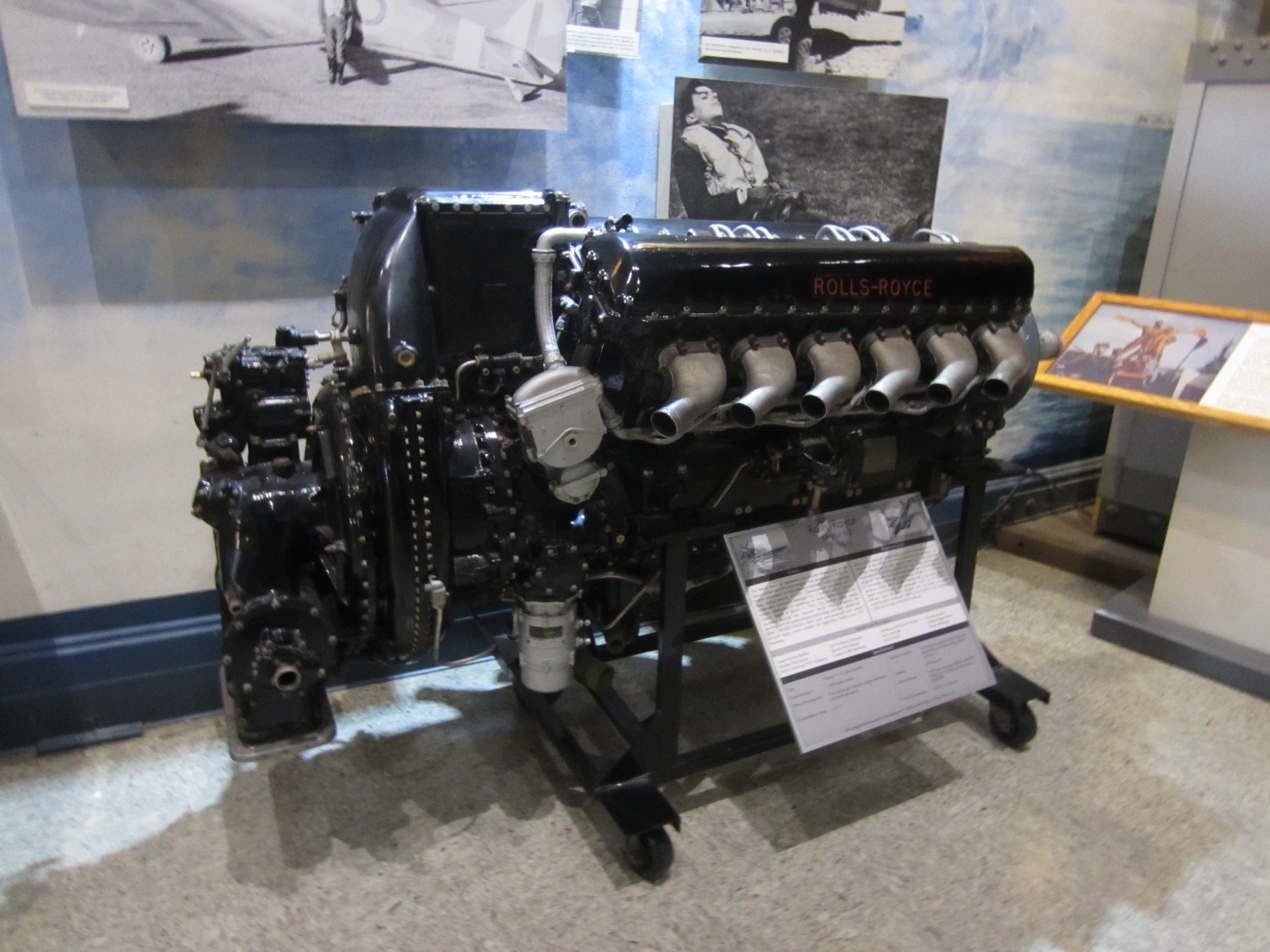

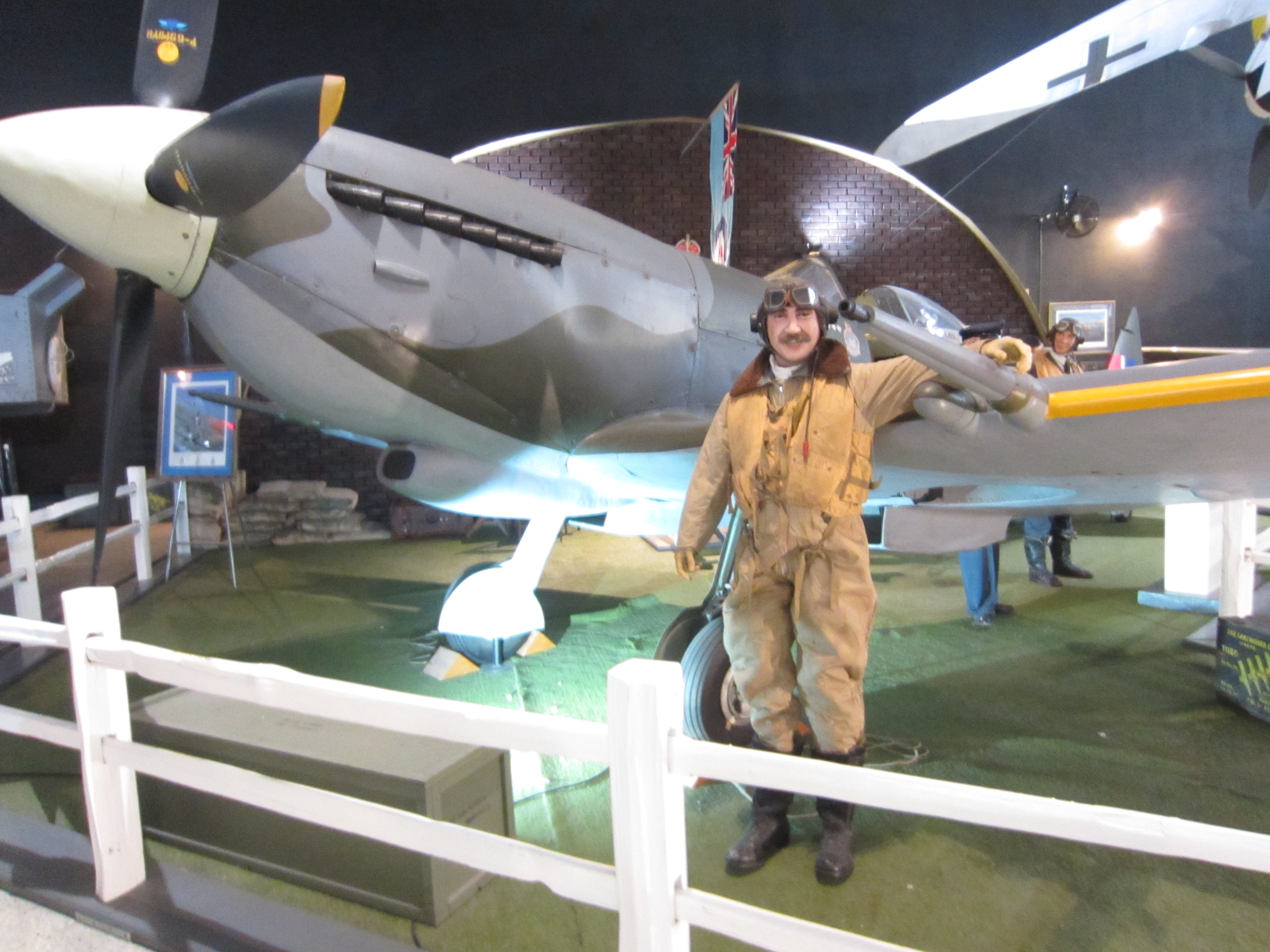

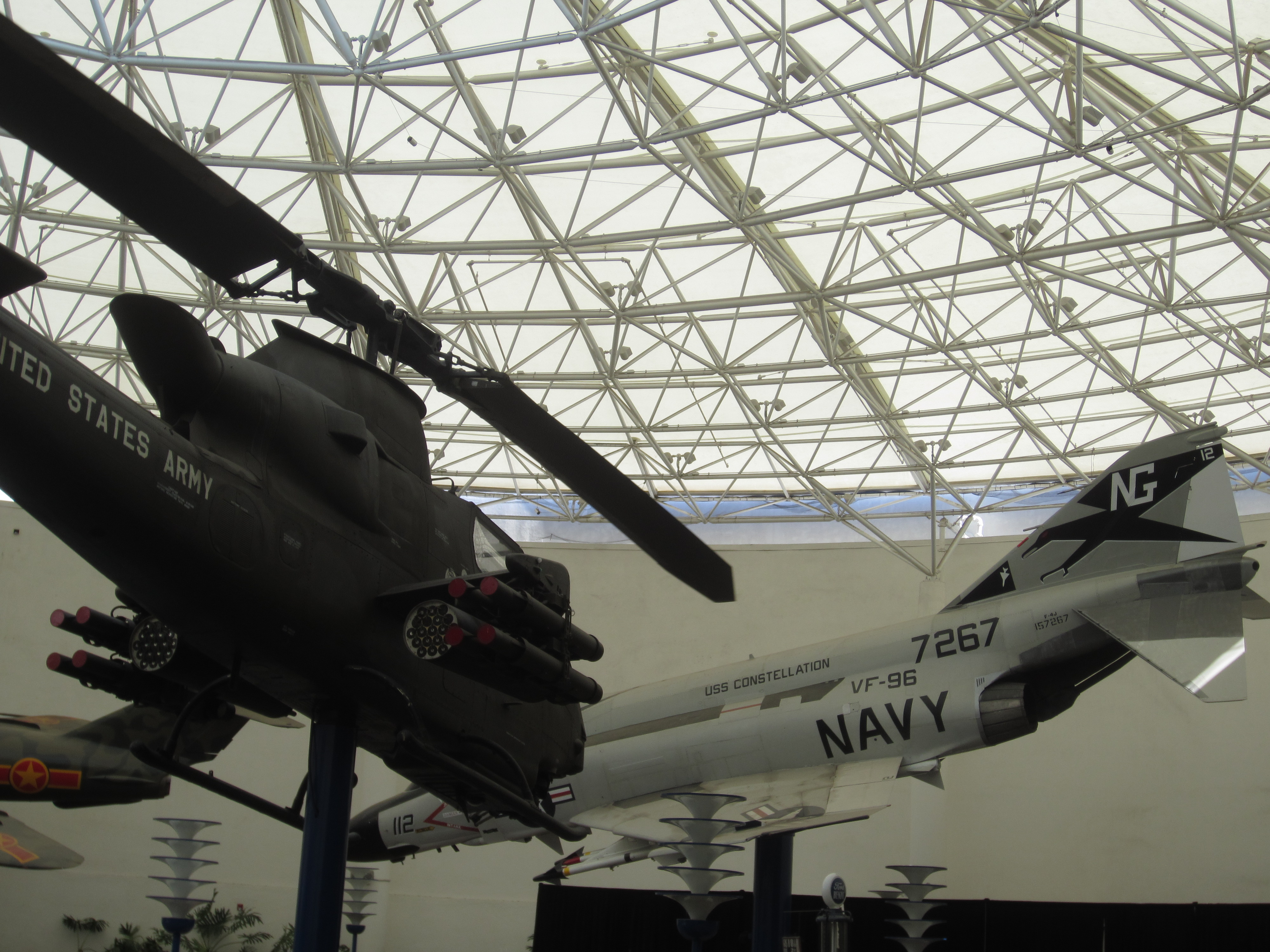

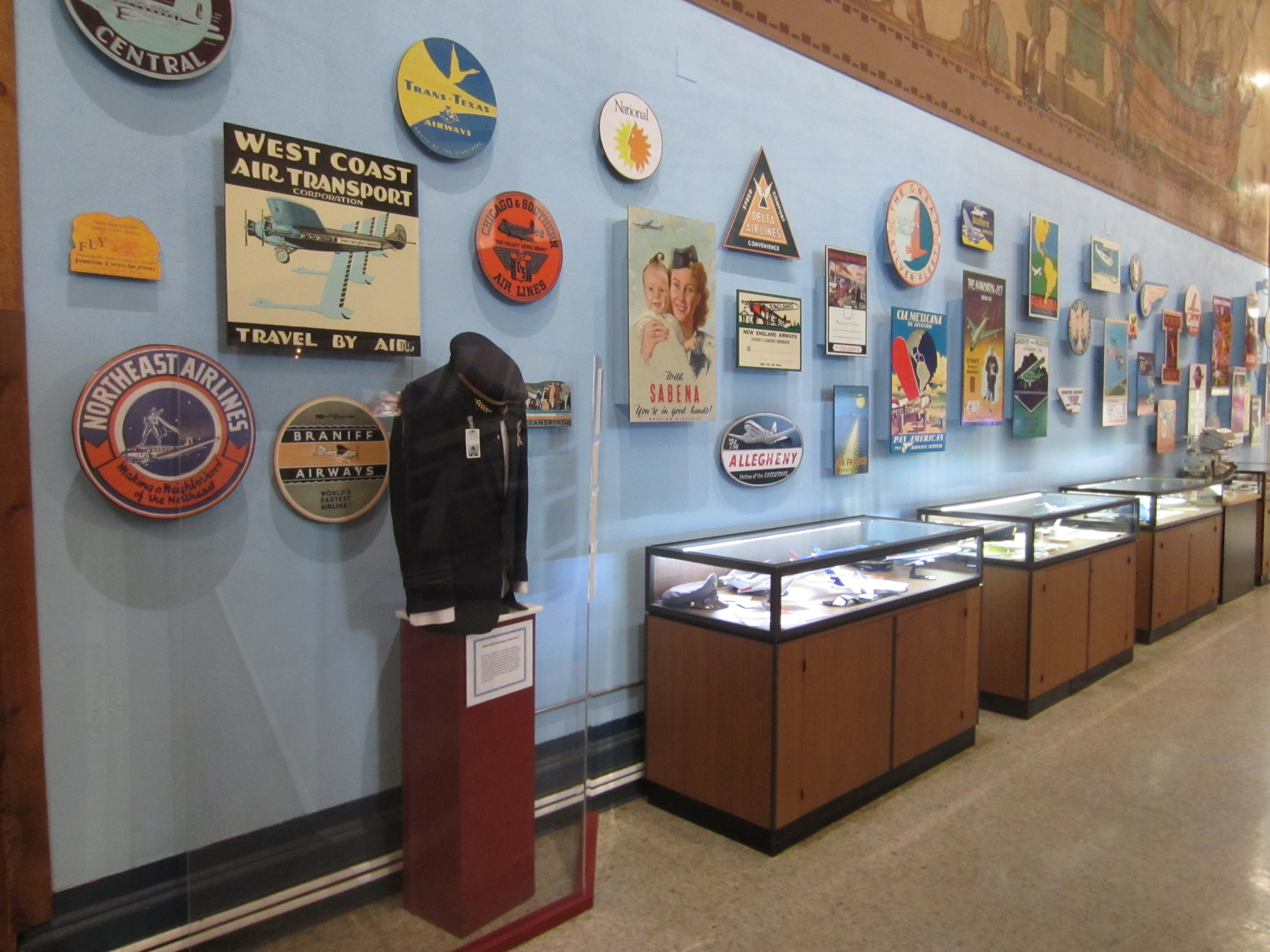

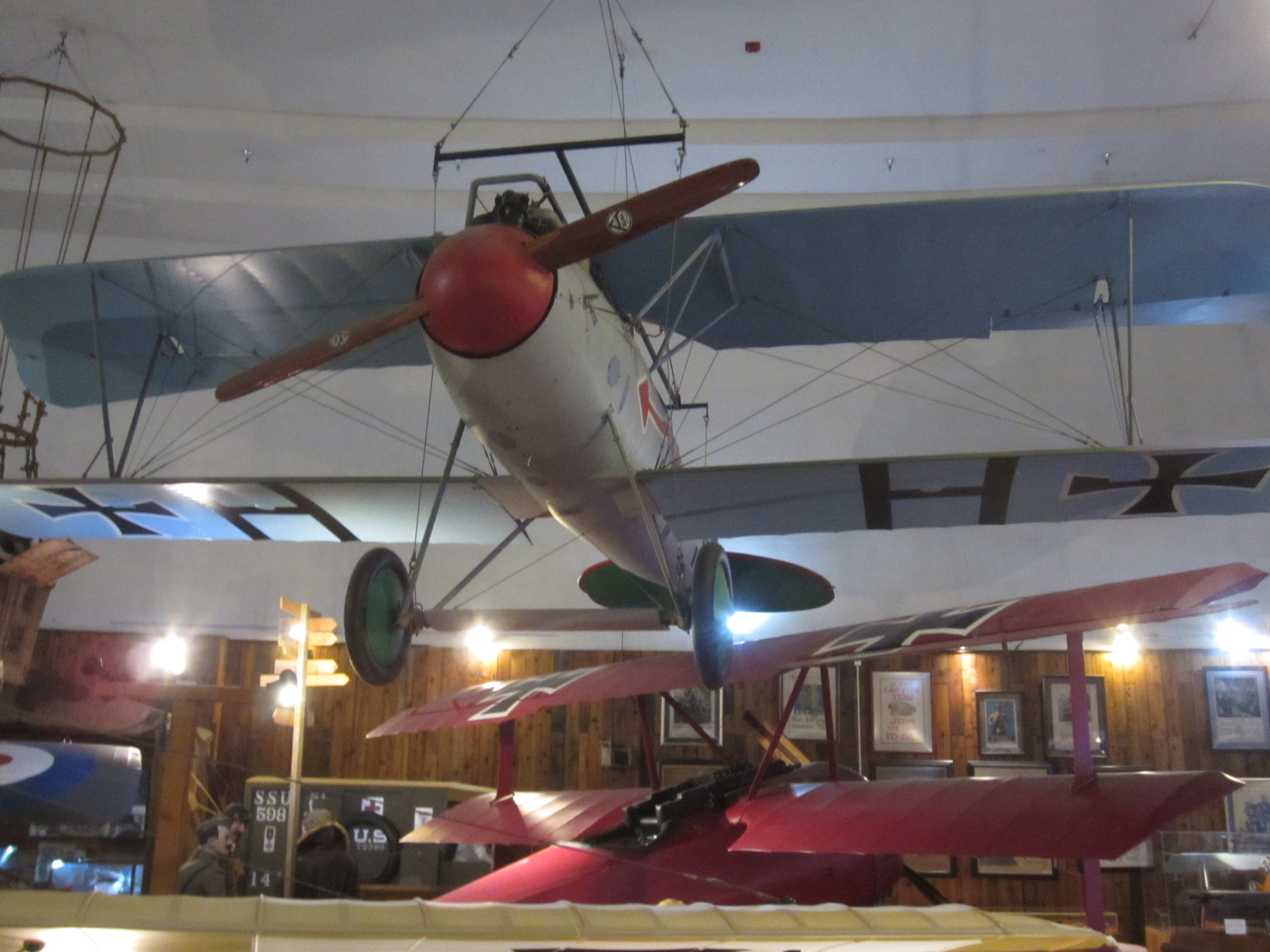

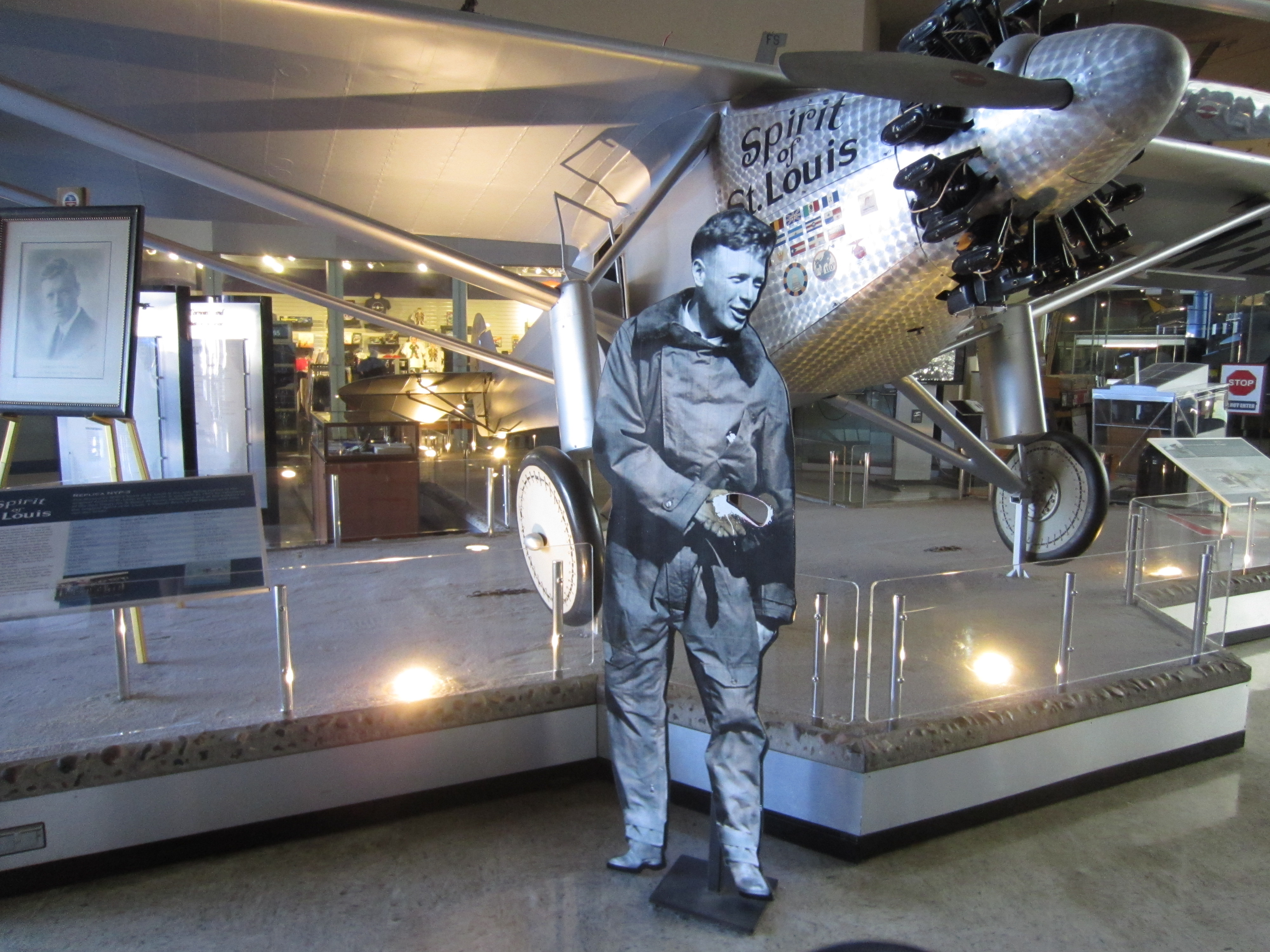

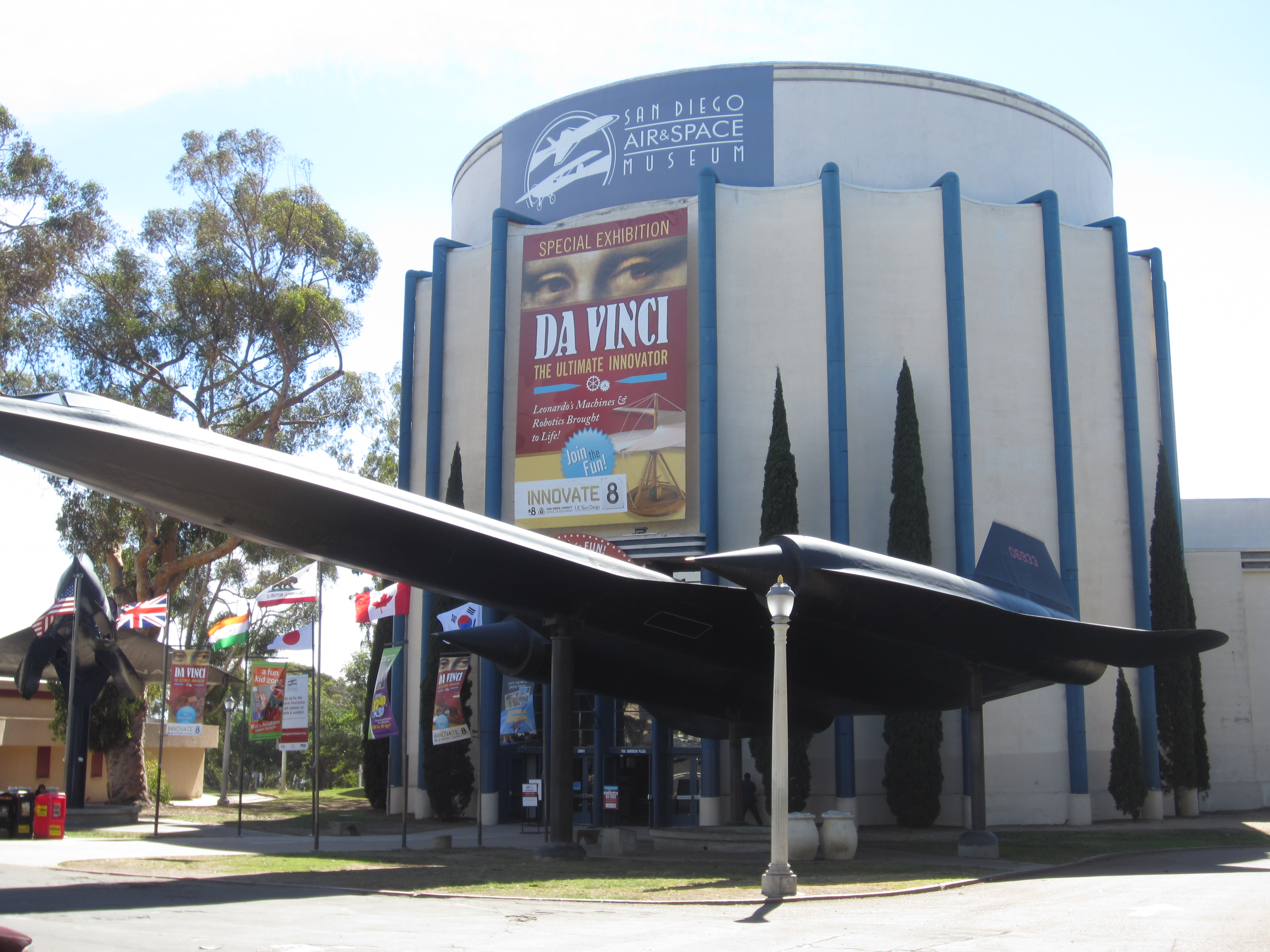

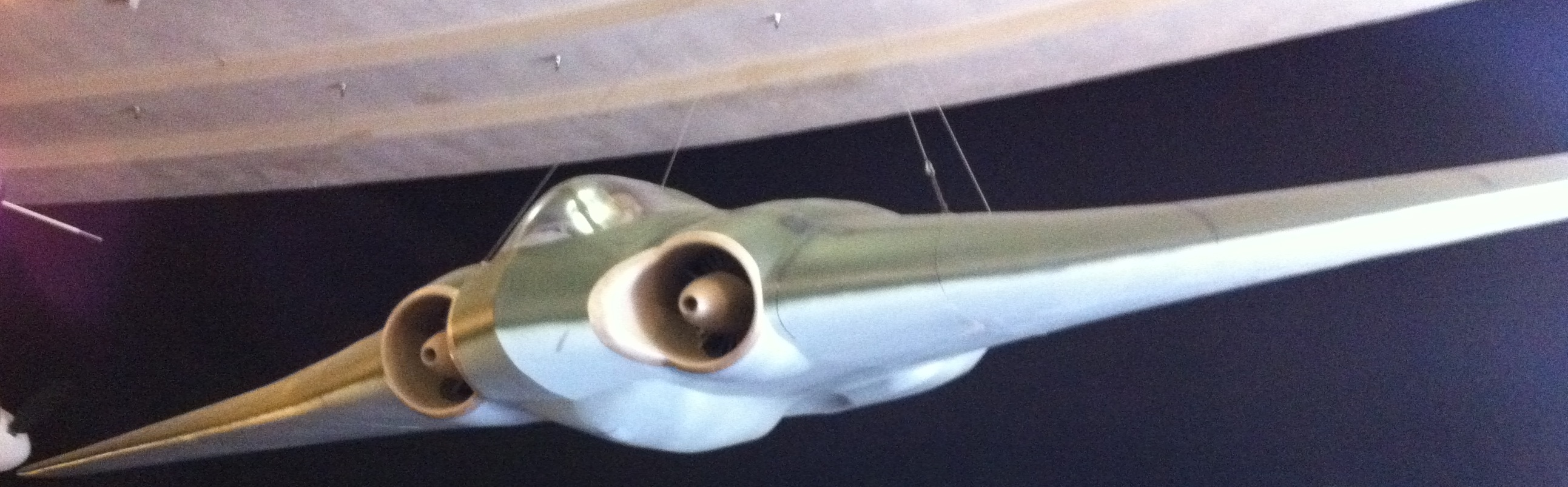
Replica Ho 229

== Special events ==
The museum hosts a number of lectures, student programs, and other special events. Groups can rent the Pavilion of Flight for their own event or dinner.

== See also ==
- USS Midway Museum – Another air museum in San Diego which is a former aircraft carrier turned museum ship.
- List of aviation museums
