= Sergey Vasilyevich Belyaev =

Imperial russian army (born 1856)

Sergey Belyaev
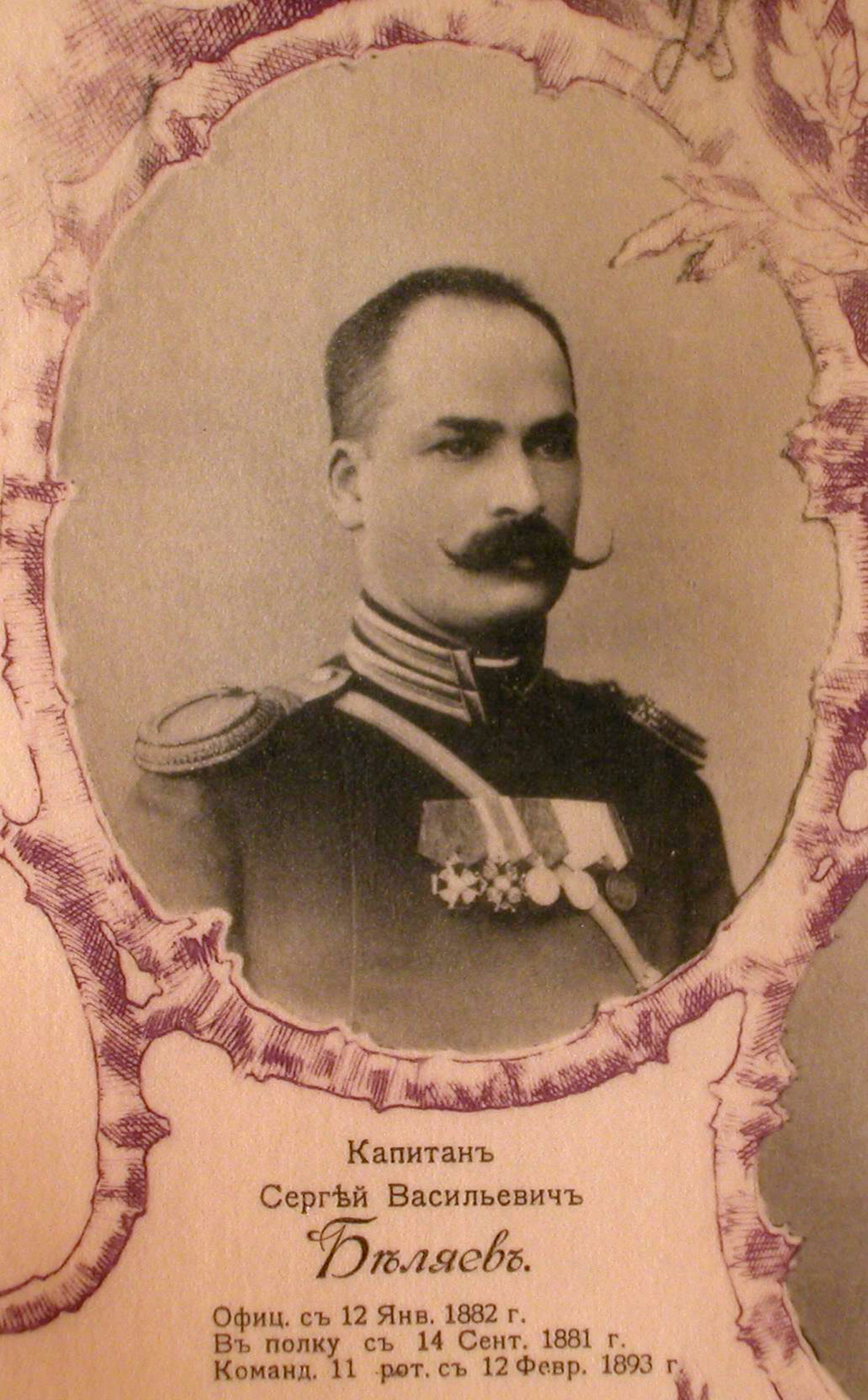
- Belyaev Sergey Vasilyevich, Brigade commander of the Russian Imperial Army in 1914–1916
- Born: 2 October 1856; Moscow, Russian Empire
- Died: unknown unknown
- Military career
- Allegiance: Russian Empire
- Branch: Imperial Russian Army
- Service years: 1879–1916
- Rank: Major general
- Conflicts: World War I
- Awards: see below

Sergey Vasilyevich Belyaev (Russian: Серге́й Васи́льевич Беля́ев; 20 September (2 October, new style) 1856, Moscow – ?) was a major general of the Imperial Russian Army and a brigade commander of the 83rd infantry division.

== Biography ==
Sergei Belyaev originated from the Moscow Governorate nobility. In Moscow, he lived in the Frolov family house next to the Saint Nicholas Church on Pillars. He graduated from the Lazarev Institute of Oriental Languages in Moscow and then passed an officer’s examination at the 2nd Constantine Military School in Saint-Petersburg.

He resided at Bolshoy Sampsonievsky Avenue, 65.

== Service ==
He started his military career in 1879. Starting in 1882, he served as praporshchik and podporuchik at the Moscow Guard Regiment. In 1886 he became a poruchik and in 1893, he was promoted to the stabs-kapitan rank for a distinction in service. He subsequently commanded the 11th company at the Moscow Guard Regiment.

In 1897, he was promoted to the captain’s rank. In 1901, Belyaev was awarded an Order of Saint Stanislaus of the 2nd class, and in 1904 he was awarded an Order of Saint Anna of the 2nd class. In 1903, he became a colonel. In 1909, he received an Order of Saint Vladimir of the 4th class.

== World War I ==
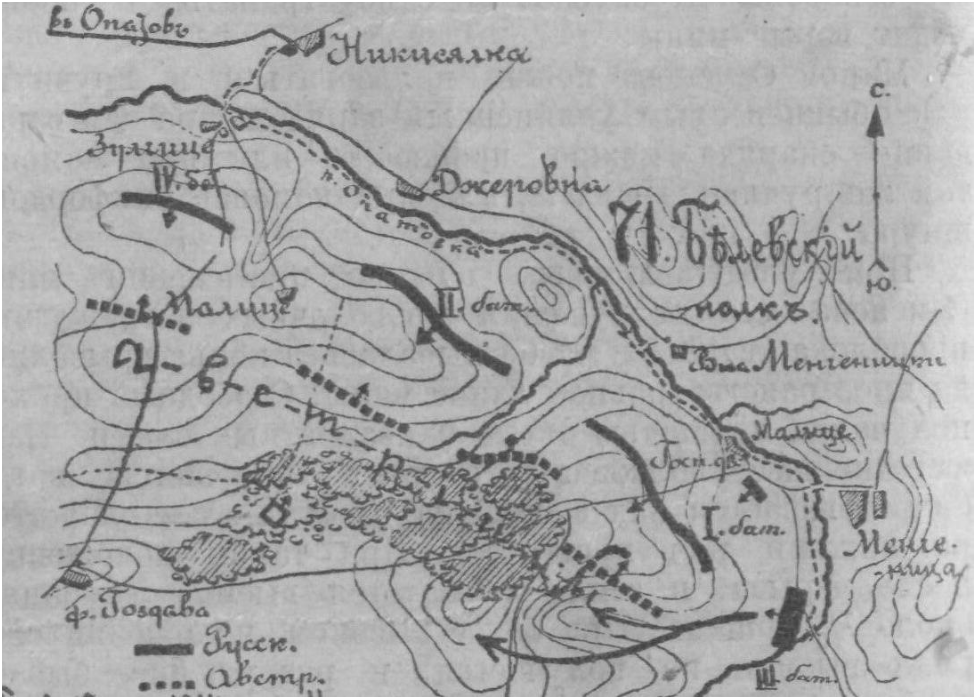
71st Belevsky regiment Offensive near Opatovka river in Galicy (South-Eastern Poland)

Belyaev fought in World War I, as the commanding officer of the 71st Belevsky Regiment as a colonel. He was wounded at the front line and was in the Kiev military hospital from 18 to 30 August 1914. Together with Lieutenant-Colonel Podpolkovnik Ivan D. Datsenko, he commanded the 71st Infantry Belevsky Regiment during the victorious attack on the Austrians by the Opatovka River in October 1914, which resulted in the capture of over 900 prisoners

In November 1914 he was appointed commander of the brigade of the 83rd Infantry Division, which fought in eastern Poland. On 24 May 1915, he was promoted to major general from 9 November 1914.

While at the front, he received several more military insignia. In March 1915, he received swords and a bow to the Order of Saint Vladimir, 4th degree (for military merit); in April of the same year, he received the Order of Saint Vladimir 3rd degree with swords. The last military award he is known to have received was the Order of Saint Stanislaus, 1st degree with swords, which was granted on 16 June 1916.

As of 10 July 1916, he served in the same rank and position, when the 83rd Infantry Division participated in the bloody offensive operation in the region of Baranovichi. He kept records in a field book until 22 July 1917, while the division was in the village of Kvasovitsa, Volynsk Oblast (now north-western Ukraine). The place and date of his death are unknown.

== Awards ==
- Order of St. Stanislaus 2nd class (1901).
- Order of St. Anna 2nd class (1904).
- Order of St. Vladimir of the 4th class (1909), swords and bows to this order (1915).
- Order of St. Vladimir of the 3rd class with swords (1915).
- Order of St. Stanislaus 1st degree with swords (16.06.1916).

== Family ==
His father Belyaev Vasily Alexeyevich (1823-1881) was a professor at the Lazarev Institute of Oriental Languages. His mother Belyaeva Olga Mikhailovna (1833-1912) was from the Frolov family, who were Moscow merchant jewelers.

Sergei Belyaev was married to Belyaeva Evgenia Platonovna. His brother Belyaev Nikolai Vasilievich (1859-1920) was an entrepreneur and one of the founders of the Upper Volga Railroad Society. His sister Belyaeva Maria Vasilievna (1869-?) was married to Alexey Belyaev (1859-1906) the Consul general of the Russian Empire in Damascus and Secretary of the Imperial Orthodox Palestine Society.

== Bibliography ==
- Belyaev Sergey Vasilievich // List of colonels by rank. Compiled on March 1, 1914 - SPb.: Military printing press of the Empress Catherine the Great, 1914. - P. 25.
- Volkov S.V. The Generality of the Russian Empire: The Encyclopedic Dictionary of Generals and Admirals from Peter I to Nicholas II: in 2 volumes. - M.: Tsentrpoligraf, 2009. - T. 1: AK. - P. 523.
- Belyaev Sergey Vasilievich // Biographical Dictionary. Higher ranks of the Russian Empire (22.10.1721 - 2.03.1917) / Comp. E. L. Potemkin. - M., 2017. - T. I: A-Z. - P. 136.
