= Nikolai Belyaev =

Nikolai Belyaev may refer to:

- Nikolai Belyaev (politician) (1903–1966), Soviet politician, leader of the Kazakhstan branch of Soviet Communist Party
- Nikolai Belyaev (general) (1897–1976), Soviet general during the Battle of Tolvajärvi in World War II
- Nikolai Vasilievich Belyaev (1859–1920), Russian philanthropist and entrepreneur
- Nikolaj Alekseevich Belyaev, russian astronomer
- Belyaev, Nikolaï Alekseïevitch, soviet boxer
