= Viktor Belyaev =

Aircraft designer

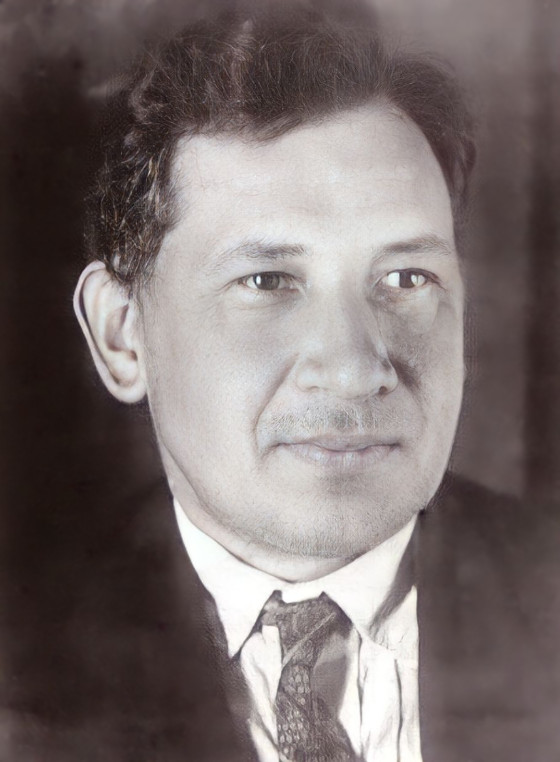
- Born: Viktor Nikolayevich Belyaev; 28 March 1896; Moscow, Russian Empire
- Died: 25 July 1953 (aged 57); Moscow, USSR
- Occupation: aircraft designer
- Notable work: BP-2, BP-3, DB-LK

Viktor Nikolayevich Belyaev (28 March 1896 — 25 July 1953) was a Soviet aircraft designer, former head of the OKB-4, and the founder of the science of the strength of aircraft structures in the Soviet Union.

== Biography ==
Viktor Belyaev was born in the family of Nikolai Vasilievich Belyaev, an engineer and founder of the Upper Volga Railway. Before the Russian Revolution, he studied mathematics at the Moscow State University. After the revolution, he was able to continue his studies for short periods of time at the Moscow Polytechnic Institute (1920-1922) and then at the 1st Moscow State University (1922-1923).

He began his career in 1918. For some time, he worked at a number of enterprises, including the railway and teaching, but in 1925, he began to work in the aviation industry as a strength engineer in the design bureau of Dmitry Grigorovich.

In 1926, he transferred to the Central Aerohydrodynamic Institute (TsAGI), to the design office of Andrei Tupolev in the brigade of Vladimir Petlyakov, where he participated in the strength calculations of the ANT-6, ANT-7, ANT-9, ANT-14, ANT-20 aircraft. Soon, Petlyakov's team was transformed into a separate design bureau from 1931, where Belyaev took the post of chief of the settlement brigade. In 1930, Belyaev began to work part-time as a researcher in the strength department of TsAGI.

In the early 1930s, Belyaev created the BP-2 (TsAGI-2) glider, a prototype of an unusual aircraft he had conceived. In August 1934, on a glider rally in Koktebel, the glider's flights demonstrated excellent flight qualities.

In 1935, Belyaev consolidated his success by creating the record-breaking BP-3 glider, which made its first flight on 18 June 1935. The aerodynamic quality of the glider was very high at 33 units. There is unconfirmed information about the construction of several BP-3 in the workshops of the school of sea pilots in the city of Yeysk.

In 1935, a competition for high-speed transport aircraft was announced by the Aviation All-Union Scientific Engineering and Technical Society (AviaVNITO) and the newspaper Za Rulem. Belyaev's design team submitted a project for a twin-engine, twin-fuselage aircraft of an unusual design, called AviaVNITO-3. The project was among the winners of the competition and recommended for construction, but none of the competition aircraft were built. In 1937, the design team began developing a bomber on the basis of the AviaVNITO-3 project. In 1939, Belyaev was appointed one of the chief designers of the TsAGI Special Designs plant. In July 1940, he was awarded the degree of chief designer of the third category together with aircraft designers Artem Mikoyan, Mikhail Gurevich, Nikolai Kamov, and others.

After returning from evacuation in 1943 and until his death, Belyaev worked at TsAGI. In 1940, he was awarded the degree of Doctor of Technical Sciences without defending a thesis, and in 1946, the title of professor.

== Awards ==
- Order of the Red Banner of Labour (1931, 1945)

== Aircraft ==
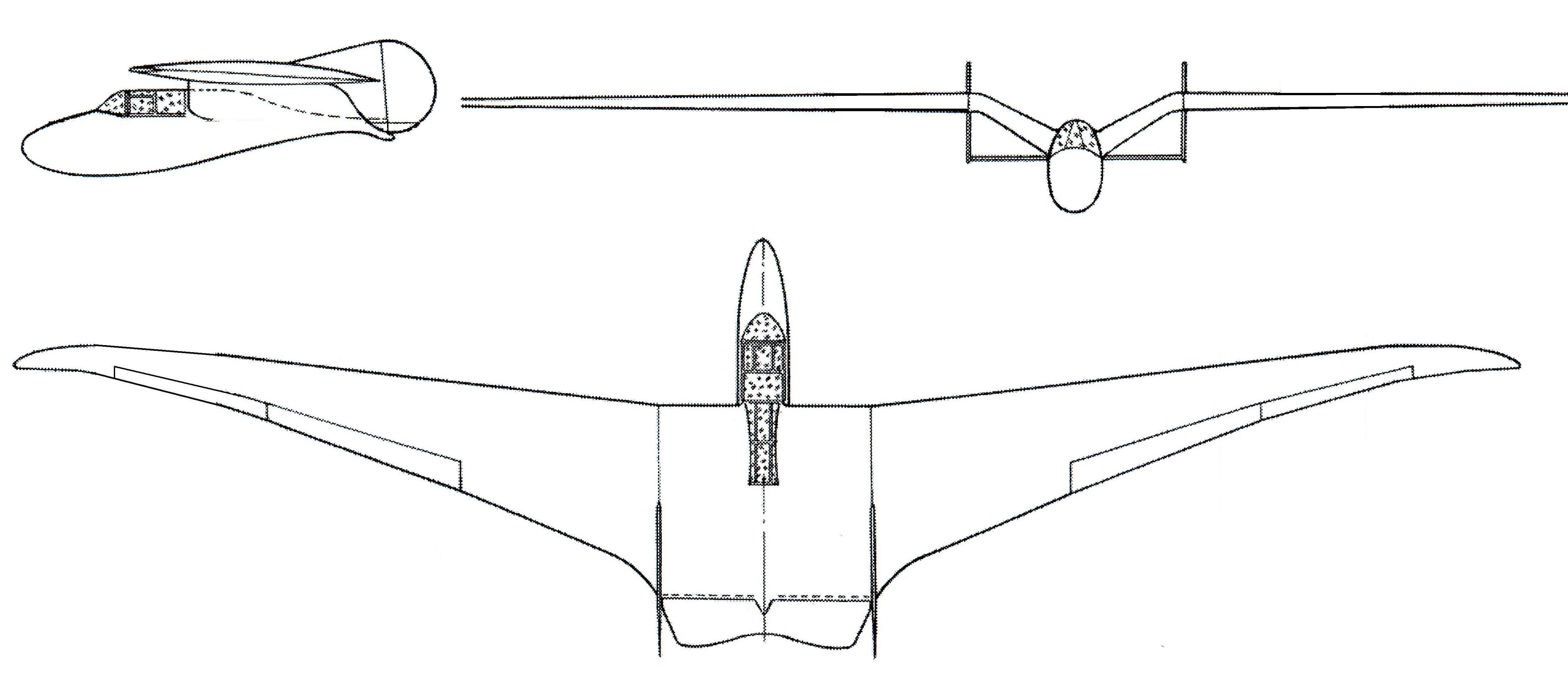
Design of a glider BP-3

- BP-2 (TsAGI-2)
- BP-3

Record glider of a tailless scheme with a backward swept wing with a central part in the form of a “seagull”. The first flight was made on July 18, 1935. According to unconfirmed data, several BP-3s were built in the workshops of the school of sea pilots in the town of Yeisk. BP-3 characteristics:
• Crew — 2 people.
• Wingspan — 20 m.
• Empty weight — 400 kg.
• Aerodynamic quality — 33:1.

- UK-1А

Experimental aircraft with "flex wing".

- EON

Experimental single fighter.

- DB-LK

Long-range bomber - flying wing.
The Beljajew DB-LK was built and flew satisfactorily in 1939 and in 1940 it was presented to the public during the Moscow parade over the Red Square. Only one was built, and it was destroyed by the Soviet authorities due to the WWII.

== Family ==
His father, Nikolai Vasilievich Belyaev was the founder and chairman of the Society of the Upper Volga Railway. His mother, Alexandra Alexandrovna,, came from the Alekseev, which was a family of merchants. She ended up emigrating to Nice. His older brothers and sister also emigrated after the revolution: Alexander (1891-1977) to Berlin, Nikolay (1892-1969) to Paris, and Ksenia (1894-1985) to Nice. Other family members (brothers Alexey (1897 -?), Lev (1899 -?), David (1901-?) remained in the USSR.

== See also ==
- Glider
- Soviet Air Forces

== Bibliography ==
- Aviation and time, No. 4, 2008. Article of M. Maslov, Professor Belyaev's Mechanical Birds. http://www.k2x2.info/transport_i_aviacija/aviacija_i_vremja_2008_04/p9.php (ru)
- Encyclopedia "Aviation". - M .:The Great Russian Encyclopedia. Svishchev G. G. 1998. (ru)
- Yelenevsky G.S. V.N. Belyaev (1896–1953) // Strength of aircraft. M., 1967. P. 3–11. (ru)
- Kutyinov V.F., Lyakhovenko I.A. To the 100th anniversary of the birth of V.N. Belyaev // Air fleet equipment. 1996. No. 5-6. Pp. 59–62. (ru)
- Frolov V.M. 90 years since the birth of V.N. Belyaev // From the history of aviation and astronautics. M., 1986. Ed. 64. pp. 20–28. (ru)
- Beljajew BP-3 scale 1:2 Belyaev Viktor Nikolayevich https://www.youtube.com/watch?v=DX8aDmfMT3k
- Beljajew BP-3 Bau https://vimeo.com/167866848
- Beljajew BP2 Erstflug https://www.youtube.com/watch?v=-rRUuYoNBFc
- Scratchbuilt 1/72 Belyaiev BP-2 1934 http://www.internetmodeler.com/scalemodels/aviation/Scratchbuilt_1_72_Belyaiev_BP-2_1934.php
- BP-2 (TsAGI-2) http://www.airwar.ru/enc/glider/bp2.html (ru)
- Yudenok V. Soviet aircraft of the Second World War.
- Le Fana de l'Aviation. Pierre Gaillard, Victor Kulikov. L'etrange, mais Veritable DB-LK.
- Le Fana de l'Aviation. Mikhail Maslov. Le professeur Belyaev et ses etranges ailes.
- Beljajew BP-3 Flug mit on.board: https://www.youtube.com/watch?v=DX8aDmfMT3k
