= Belyayev DB-LK =

1939 bomber aircraft prototype

DB-LK
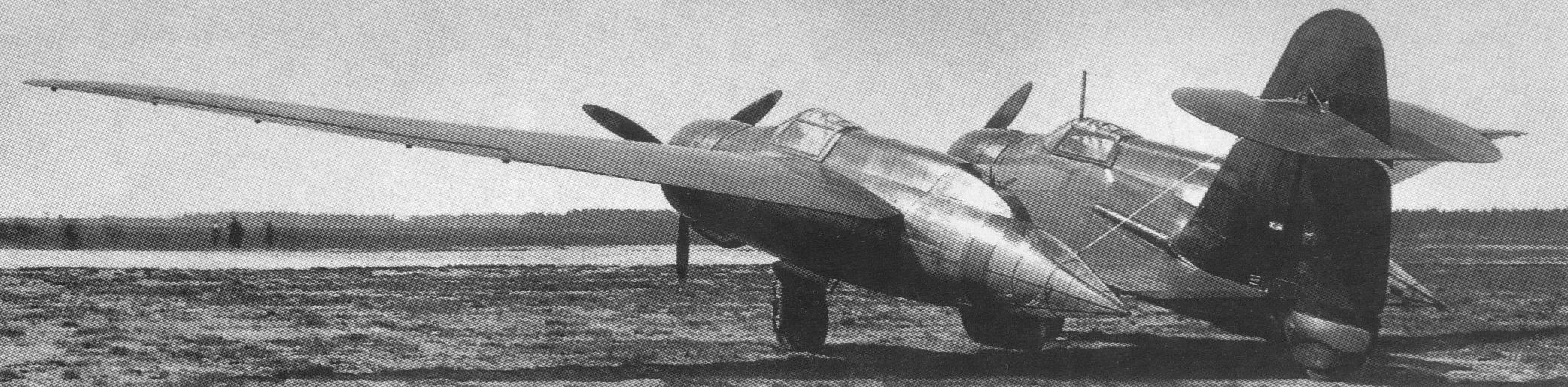

General information
- Type: Bomber
- National origin: USSR
- Manufacturer: Viktor Nikolayevich Belyayev
- Designer: Viktor Nikolayevich Belyayev
- Number built: 1

History
- First flight: 1940

The DB-LK (Dahl'niy Bombardirovshchik-LK – long-range bomber–flying wing) was a bomber aircraft designed and built in the USSR in 1939.

== Development ==
Viktor Nikolayevich Belyayev had an illustrious early career with TsAGI, AVIAVnito, Aeroflot, OMOS, AGOS, KOSOS and the Tupolev OKB. He also designed and built several gliders from 1920, including flying wing designs, and in 1934 he designed a transport aircraft with twin tail-booms each accommodating ten passengers.

Belyaev developed the twin boom idea of his "batwing" BP-2 glider into the twin-fuselage DB-LK, which had two short fuselages either side of a very long chord wing centre section, with the outer wing sections swept forward 5 deg 42 min, tapering at 7:1 out to raked back tips. A large fin and rudder on a short central boom, carried a small tailplane with very large elevators.

The airframe was of light alloy stressed skin construction with five spar wings covered with sheet aluminium alloy. Each fuselage pod carried a single M-88 engine (replaced with 950 h.p. Tumansky M-87bs for testing) in a long chord cowling, driving a three-bladed VISh-23D propeller, as well as a pilot/navigator cockpit and radio operator/gunner station in each of the extensively glazed tail-cones. The outer wings had slats, ailerons and 45° zap flaps, the raked tips also had small ailerons. The retractable undercarriage consisted of single main legs in the fuselage pods aft of the engines and a tail-wheel in the base of the fin.

Before flight trials began, the test pilot, M.A. Nyukhtikov, carried out many fast taxis to assess the handling of the unconventional DB-LK, one of which ended in an undercarriage collapse due to the plane hitting a stump that had not been removed. Flight trials eventually got under way early in 1940 revealing an excellent performance, but with a high sensitivity to centre of gravity changes which resulted in a long takeoff and made the plane difficult to handle except by experienced pilots. The M-87b engines meant that the plane could only achieve an unladen speed of 303 mph instead of the projected performance of 340 mph which was not an advantage over current designs. The navigator and rear crew positions were very cramped, and visibility for the navigator and pilot were poor. In addition to its other faults, the crew compartments had a tendency to fill with exhaust fumes, which would have resulted in the crew having to wear oxygen masks. Due to these issues production was not authorized, but the Soviet Air Force was intrigued by the overall design and looked into having the DB-LK redesigned as a dive bomber, but nothing came of this idea. The plane was likely destroyed during World War II.

== Specifications (DB-LK) ==
Data from Gunston, Bill. "Encyclopaedia of Russian Aircraft 1875–1995". London:Osprey. 1995. ISBN 1-85532-405-9

General characteristics

- Crew: 4
- Length: 9.78 m (32 ft 1 in)
- Wingspan: 21.6 m (70 ft 10.5 in)
- Height: 3.65 m (11 ft 11.75 in)
- Wing area: 56.87 m^{2} (612 sq ft)
- Empty weight: 6,004 kg (13,236 lb)
- Gross weight: 10,672 kg (23,528 lb)
- Powerplant: 2 × M-88 , 708.41 or 745.70 kW (950 or 1,000 hp) each

Performance

- Maximum speed: 488 km/h (303 mph, 263 kn)
- Range: 2,900 km (1,800 mi, 1,600 nmi)
- Service ceiling: 8,500 m (27,890 ft)
- Rate of climb: 6.15 m/s (1,210 ft/min)

Armament

- 4 × 7.62mm ShKAS machine guns; one pair to each tailcone.
- 2 × 7.62mm ShKAS machine guns; fixed, forward firing, in the wing centre section leading edge.

== See also ==
Aircraft of comparable role, configuration, and era

- Belyayev Babochka

Related lists

- List of aircraft

== Sources ==
- Gunston, Bill. The Osprey Encyclopaedia of Russian Aircraft 1875–1995 London, Osprey. 1995. ISBN 1-85532-405-9
