= Nikolai Belyaev (entrepreneur) =

Russian philanthropist and entrepreneur

Nikolay Vasilyevich Belyaev
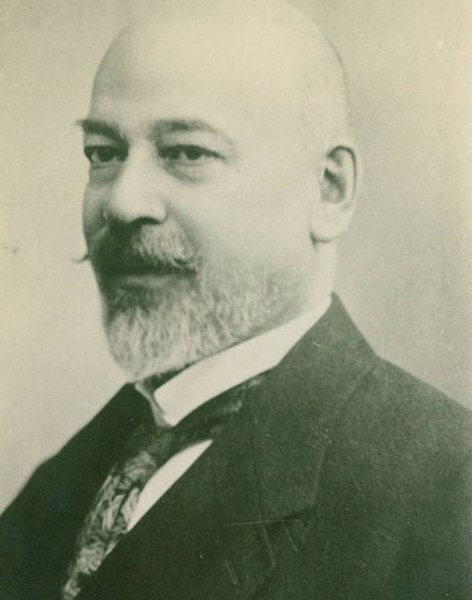
- Born: 27 April 1859; Moscow, Russia
- Died: 15 February 1920; Trinity Lavra of St. Sergius
- Resting place: unknown
- Occupation(s): Railroad, Businessman, philanthropist
- Spouse: Alexandra Alexandrovna Belyaeva (m. 1890–1920)
- Children: 8, including Viktor Belyaev

Nikolay Vasilyevich Belyaev (Russian: Николай Васильевич Беляев) (27 April 1859 – 15 February 1920) was a Russian philanthropist, entrepreneur, and founder and chairman of the Upper Volga Railway Society.

== Biography ==
Nikolay Belyaev was born into a professor’s family in Moscow. For his father's services, the Belyaev family received hereditary nobility in 1884. In 1879, he graduated from the Cadet Corps at the Oryol Bakhtin Military Gymnasium.

Belyaev served as treasurer of the newly-founded Alexandrine Community of Sisters of Mercy, named after Empress Alexandra Feodorovna, under the Christian Aid Committee of the Russian Red Cross Society. It organized a comprehensive system of nursing services throughout Russia. For his services to the community, Belyaev was awarded the Order of St. Anna and the Order of St. Stanislaus, 3rd degree. In 1893, he became College Registrar and in 1896 be became a Provincial Secretary. In 1900 he became a State Councillor. He also participated in the Committee for Assistance to the poorest students of the 4th Moscow Gymnasium.

== Entrepreneurship ==
Together with similar-minded entrepreneurs, Belyaev founded and subsequently headed the Society for the Construction and Operation of the Upper Volga Railway, which built and ran a railway line in the north of Moscow on a private basis. Belyaev was one of the main initiators of the creation of the railway, which was an alternative to the upper Volga river route. The rapidly developing industry and timber trade required more reliable and high-speed transport, so the idea of building a railway was warmly supported by regional authorities and entrepreneurs The railway was constructed in 1914-1918, and later finished in the 1930s.

Once privately owned, the railway is now part of the October Railway and connects Moscow with Kalyazin and Uglich.

Belyaev was also a member of the jewelry trading house of D.P. and M. Frolov and of the Moscow Automobile Society, which organized public automobile races and developed traffic regulations. He owned one of the first Mercedes Benz cars in Moscow.

As a liberal-minded member of the Constitutional Democratic Party, Belyaev sought to reform the Russian state, and, as a candidate for the Moscow City Duma, supported the Provisional Government. The February Revolution proved to be a severe challenge for him and his family. While some members of the family fought in the White Army and were actively involved in anti-Bolshevik activism (and subsequently fled the country), others remained and suffered repression before adapting to the new regime.

On 15 February 1920, Belyaev died under unclear circumstances in the Trinity Lavra of St. Sergius. Belyaev was the last owner of the Golovin estate on Potapovsky Lane in Moscow.

== Family network ==
Belyaev's father, Vasily Alexeyevich Belyaev (1823-1881), was a professor at the Lazarev Institute of Oriental Languages. His mother, Olga Mikhailovna Belyaeva (1833-1912), came from the Frolov family, who were Moscow merchant jewelers.

Belyaev was married to Alexandra Alexandrovna Belyaeva (1865-1954), who came from the well-known Moscow merchant family Alexeev. Her father and grandfather owned the Lubyansky passage in Moscow. She emigrated to Nice. They had eight children, of whom the eldest, Alexander (1891-1977), emigrated to Berlin and later to Munich after fighting for the White Army. Another son, Viktor Belyaev (1896 – 1955), became a renowned Soviet aircraft designer.

Belyaev's brother Sergey Belyaev (after 1856 - 1917) was a general in the Russian Imperial Army. His sister Maria Vasilievna Belyaeva (1869-?) was married to the Consul general of the Russian Empire in Damascus, Secretary of the Imperial Orthodox Palestine Society Alexey Belyaev (1859-1906). During World War I, she stayed with her children in Lausanne, Switzerland and remained there after Russian Revolution, never to return to Russia.

== Addresses ==
- Moscow, Armyansky lane, 4 (Frolov house)
- Moscow, Potapovsky lane, 8 (Golovin estate, Belyaev house)

== Bibliography ==
- Chernopyatov V.I. Reports of the Christian Relief Committee of the Russian Red Cross Society, 1885-1890. – Moscow, 1890.
