= Belyayev Babochka =

Experimental aircraft by Belyayev

General information
- Type: Experimental aircraft
- National origin: USSR
- Manufacturer: Belyayev
- Designer: Viktor Nikolayevich Belyayev & V.I. Yukharin

The Belyayev Babochka was a tandem seat research aircraft designed in the USSR in 1939.

== Development ==
Viktor Nikolayevich Belyayev had an illustrious early career with TsAGI, AVIAVnito, Aeroflot, OMOS, AGOS, KOSOS and the Tupolev OKB. He also designed and built several gliders from 1920, including flying wing designs.

Belalyev and V.I. Yukharin, at the Kazan Aviation Institute, designed a tandem seat single-engine research aircraft to investigate the properties of Belyayev's forward swept wing with raked tips, used on the Belyayev DB-LK, particularly the resistance to structural instability and aileron reversal. The aircraft was to have had quite sharply swept forward inner wings, with the outer third swept back at a similar angle, all with ailerons, except for flaps on the inner half of the inner wings. Relatively small tail surfaces were envisioned at the end of a relatively long fuselage. The pilot and observer sat in enclosed cockpits, with the observer's cockpit halfway between the pilot's cockpit and the tail unit.

== Specifications (Babochka) ==
Data from Gunston, Bill. "Encyclopaedia of Russian Aircraft 1875–1995". London:Osprey. 1995. ISBN 1-85532-405-9

General characteristics

- Crew: 2
- Length: 6.84 m (22 ft 5.25 in)
- Wingspan: 10.8 m (35 ft 5.25 in)
- Height: 3.65 m (11 ft 11.75 in)
- Airfoil: max speed
- Empty weight: 680 kg (1,499 lb)
- Gross weight: 1,928 kg (4,250 lb)
- Powerplant: 1 × MV-6 , 200 kW (270 hp)

Performance

- Maximum speed: 510 km/h (317 mph, 275 kn)

== See also ==
Aircraft of comparable role, configuration, and era

- Belyayev DB-LK

Related lists

- List of aircraft
