= Frolov =

Frolov (Russian: Фролов), or Frolova (feminine; Фролова) is a Russian surname that is derived from the male given name Frol and literally means Frol's. It may refer to:

People

- Aleksandr Frolov (born 1964), Russian oligarch, CEO of multinational steel company Evraz
- Alexander Frolov (born 1982), Russian ice hockey player
- Andre Frolov (born 1988), Estonian football player
- Artur Frolov (born 1970), Ukrainian chess master
- Diane Frolov, American screenwriter
- Dmitri Frolov, Soviet ice hockey player
- Dmitrii Frolov, Russian film director
- Eduard Frolov, Russian historian
- Kostyantyn Frolov (born 1972), Ukrainian football player and manager
- Nicolae Frolov (1876–1948), Romanian geologist and agronomist
- Pavlo Frolov (born 1976), Ukrainian politician
- Pyotr Frolov (1775–1839), Russian mining engineer and inventor
- Stanislav Frolov, Russian soloist with the Alexandrov Ensemble
- Valerian Frolov (1895–1961), Soviet Colonel General
- Vladimir Frolov, Russian major general
- Vladislav Frolov (born 1980), Russian sprint athlete
- Anna Frolova (born 2005), Russian Figure Skater

Other

- Frolov Chakra, an aircraft maneuver
