= Nicolae Frolov =

Romanian geologist and agronomist

Nicolae Frolov (1876–1948) was a Romanian geologist and agronomist from Bessarabia. He was noted for his work in explicating the hydrology of Bessarabia and as director of the Chișinău National Museum.

Born in Cornești, Ungheni, Bessarabia, he graduated from Chișinău Theological Seminary and then went to Estonia where in 1904 he graduated from the University of Dorpat (now Tartu). After which he taught at the universities of St, Petersburg, Kyiv and Odesa. In 1921, he moved to Chişinău and was appointed as director of the Chișinău Museum. He taught agronomy and agricultural economics at the university there until 1940, when he retired and moved to Romania. He died in Iaşi.
