= Upper Volga railway =

Railroad in Russia

Upper Volga Railway
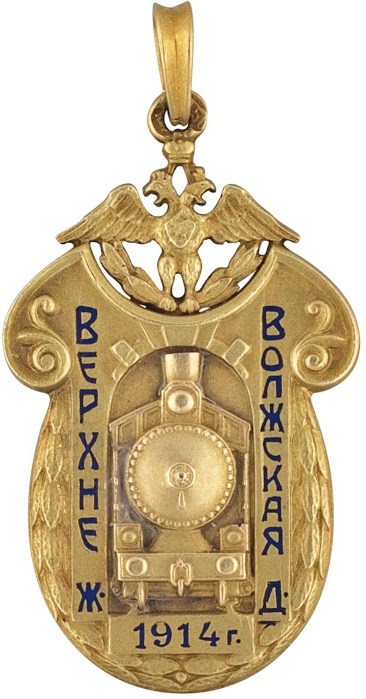
- Token of the Society of the Upper Volga Railway of the Russian Empire, 1914.

Overview
- Native name: Вероне-Волжская железная дорога
- Status: Operational
- Locale: Russia

Service
- Operator(s): Joint Stock Company for the Construction and Operation of the Upper Volga Railway

History
- Opened: 1918

The Upper Volga (Verkhne-Volzhskaya) railway (Russian: Верхне-Волжская железная дорога) was a private railway in the Upper Volga region of Russia, built in 1914–1921 and in the second half of the 1930s. It was planned as part of a backup route from Leningrad to Moscow. Today, the lines are part of the Moscow region of the October Railway.

== Main lines ==
- Savyolovo — Kalyazin (completed in 1918)
- Kashin — Kalyazin (completed in 1918)
- Kalyazin — Uglich (completed in 1930s)
- Kalyazin — Novki (not built)

== Historical background ==
The Upper Volga railway was designed and built at the beginning of the 20th century on the Tver-Rybinsk-Nizhny Novgorod route, which was promising from a transportation and economic point of view and was poorly covered by fast railway transport at that time. The railway was intended to connect the settlements of Kashin, Kalyazin, Rybinsk, and Uglich, both with each other and with the Moscow-Savyolovo line, which was completed in 1900. This would significantly speed up freight delivery to Moscow from the Volga, which at the time was performed by slow-moving punts.

The construction of the railway, the main lines of which were located and planned to the north-northwest of Moscow, in today's Tver, Yaroslavl, and Vladimir Oblasts, as well as the work of the joint-stock company that created it, can be considered a pre-revolutionary analogue of what is today commonly called a public-private partnership.

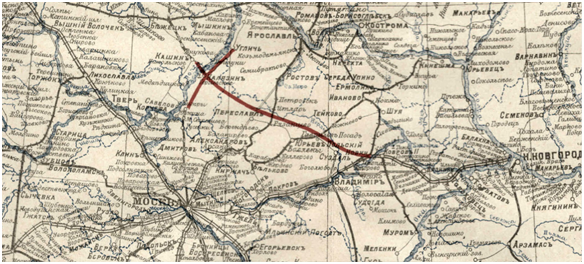
Upper Volga Railroad construction plan

This concessionary, or mixed public-private, form of financing and management was characteristic of railway construction in the Russian Empire. Amid the railway construction boom that unfolded in the mid-19th century, the Russian state combined private and publicly financed road construction, periodically switching between favoring one or the other.

From the second half of the 19th century until the Russian Revolution, several main railway lines were built and operated with private funding and state participation, forming the backbone of today's Russian railway network.

The Chinese Eastern Railway, the Kulunda and Minusinsk mainlines, the Akkerman Railway, the Southeast Railway network, and the Olonets Railway were all built with capital from private entrepreneurs and concessionaires, organized into joint-stock companies. The very concept of a joint-stock company in pre-revolutionary Russia was enshrined in the "Regulations on Share Companies," approved by the Decree of 6 December 1836 and in effect until the Russian Revolution.

The founders of railway companies received permission and administrative support from the state, but they bore enormous financial risks. To obtain permission to establish a joint-stock company, they required the consent of the supreme authority or subordinate administrative bodies, as well as the Minister of Finance.

The projects were highly risky for the entrepreneurs: even before receiving permission to establish a company, they were obligated to conduct route surveys, draw up a complete road plan, develop estimates for all construction projects, and contribute 5% of the total construction capital to the State Bank of the Russian Empire. The government could reject the project or even completely abandon the concession.

Despite the risks, operating railways was economically attractive. The government guaranteed the fulfillment of obligations on the securities of railway companies. Shareholders were guaranteed a fixed dividend not from the moment the line was put into operation, but from the day the joint-stock company was organized.

== Founders of the company and its charter ==
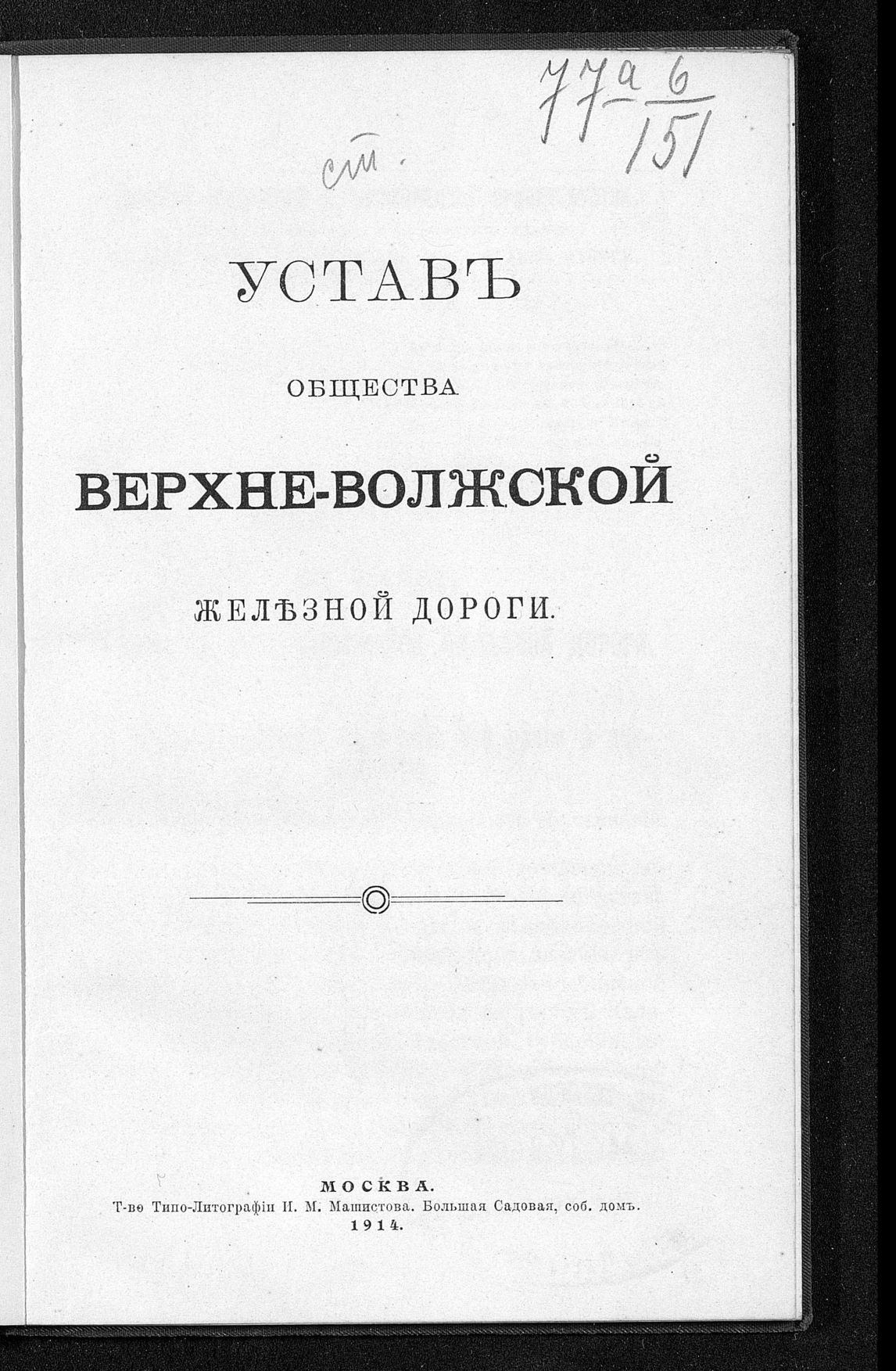
Charter of the Upper Volga Railway Company

The founders of the Upper Volga Railway Company were the nobleman and entrepreneur Nikolai Belyaev (who also served as chairman of the board), honorary citizen of the city of Pereslavl-Zalessky Leonid Pavlov, railway engineer Fyodor Mamontov, nobleman Nikolai Andreyev, personal honorary citizen Ivan Kurlyukov, and Major General Anatoly Reinbot.

The company's board of directors was located in Moscow, and the railway construction department was located in Pertsov House, St. Petersburg.

The most significant right granted to the company's shareholders was the right to own the main line and its auxiliary facilities for 81 years from the date of the inauguration of service.

At the same time, the company assumed numerous obligations to the state. Thus, upon expiration of the 81-year term, the railway and other property of the company were to be transferred to the treasury free of charge. The company's property, both real estate and movable, constituting ownership of the railway, could not be alienated or mortgaged without government permission.

Among the company's other responsibilities were surveys for the construction of the Uglich-Rybinsk line, provision of mail and, if necessary, troop transportation, provision of housing for postal and telegraph officials, and construction of a military food depot on the Kashin-Novki line.

The railway's capacity was to handle three pairs of passenger trains and six pairs of freight trains per day. The line was also intended to be used for military trains.

The line was planned to be built within three years. The total cost of the project, including rolling stock and the company's working capital, was to be 21,620,000 rubles.

== Planning and construction before the Revolution ==
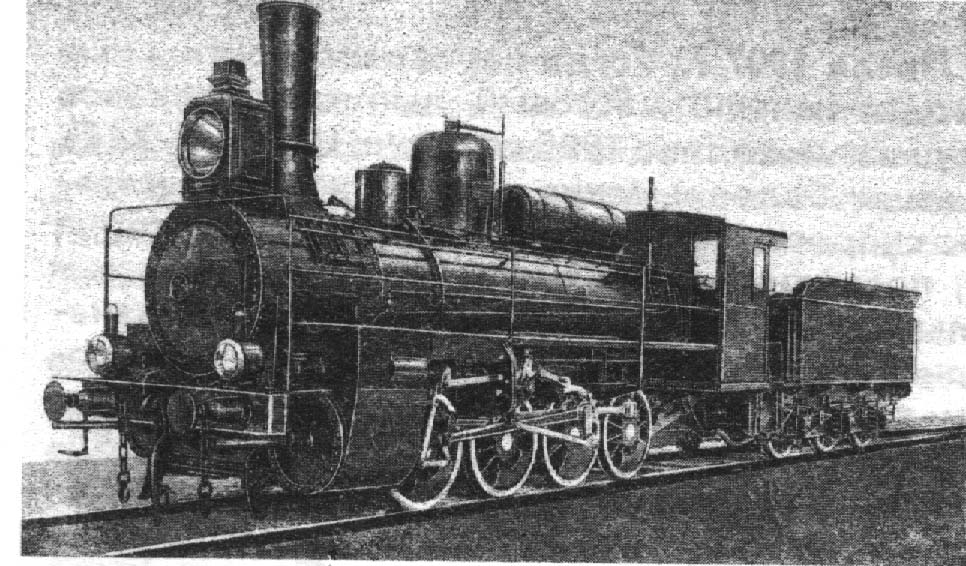
Steam locomotive of type "O". Operated in the 1900s, 1910s, 1920s on the Moscow-Savyolovo line, and later Savyolovo-Kalyazin

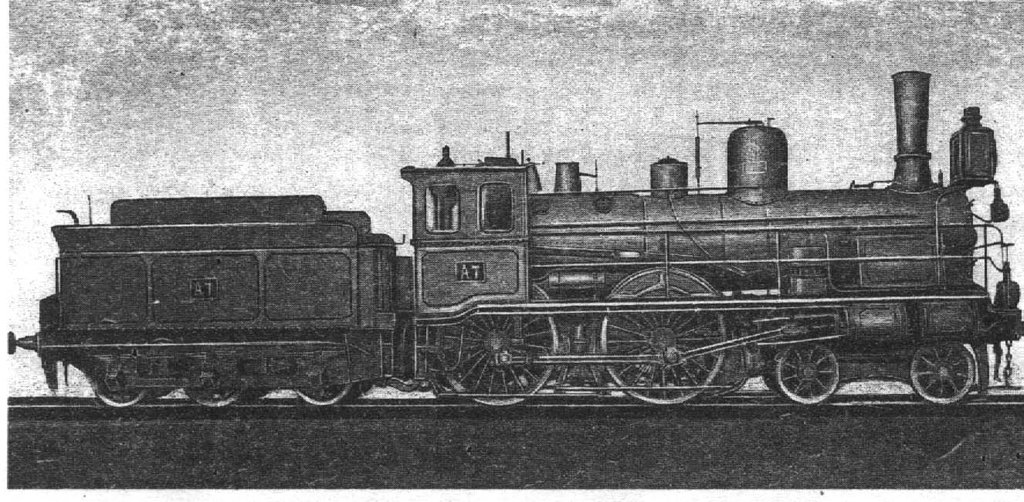
Steam locomotive of type "2-2-0-P". Operated in the 1900s, 1910s, 1920s on the lines Rybinsk-Bezhetsk and Kashin-Krasny Holm (photo from the book of V.A. Rakov "Locomotives of domestic railways").

The Upper Volga railway was built to connect Kashin (at that time a station of the Moscow-Vindavo-Rybinsk railway), Kalyazin, and Novki stations of the Moscow-Nizhny Novgorod railway.

Two more branches were also to be built from Kalyazin: the first to Savyolovo station (then under the jurisdiction of Northern Railways), and the second to the city of Uglich.

According to 1914 estimates, the total length of the line was to be 354 km. Of these, the Kashin-Novki line was to be the longest, at approximately about 255 km, the Kalyazin-Savyolovo branch 53 km, and the Kalyazin-Uglich branch approximately 46 km.

Due to World War I and the Russian Revolution, construction proceeded very slowly. During 1914–1917, the company built the Kalyazin-Savyolovo line, which opened in 1918.

A second, short line, Kashin-Kalyazin, was also built. The opening of this section closed the backup route from Moscow to St. Petersburg, which passed through Kalyazin, Ovinischi, Khvoynaya, and Mga.

In 1916, cost estimates were developed for the construction of the Kashin-Novki and Savyolovo-Uglich lines. However, due to the country's dire financial situation, construction of the Savyolovsky radius from Kalyazin via Uglich to Rybinsk (designed during the Russian Empire) never began.

== Soviet era ==
After 1918, some members of the company, such as Belyaev, suffered from repressions, and the railway lines built by the company were nationalized and transferred to the jurisdiction of the People's Commissariat of Communication Routes of the Soviet Union.

The imperial plans to build the Kalyazin-Uglich-Rybinsk line were cancelled in the 1930s during industrialization, when it became necessary to transport materials for the construction of the Uglich Hydroelectric Station. The Kalyazin-Uglich line (48 km) was quickly built according to the company's design under the Empire, opening to traffic in 1937.

Due to the flooding of the Uglich Reservoir bed, some sections of the already constructed railway had to be relocated, and some of its stations and the settlements were flooded, including the historic town of Kalyazin. The same happened to settlements on the section between Uglich and Rybinsk due to the construction of the Rybinsk Reservoir.

== Today ==
Today, the Savyolovo-Kalyazin and Kalyazin-Uglich lines are part of the Savelovsky direction of the October Railway. They carry freight trains and the Moscow-Rybinsk passenger train.

== Literature ==
1. The Upper Volga Railway project: Explanatory a note to the project. - St. Petersburg, 1913. http://rr.aroundspb.ru/1913_Kashin_Novki_Savyolovo_Uglija_zd-1.pdf
2. Technical conditions for design and construction of the Upper Volga railway. - Moscow, 1914. http://rr.aroundspb.ru/1913_Kashin_Novki_Savyolovo_Uglija_zd-2.pdf
3. Essay on the petition of Kalyazin's public figures on the conduct of a railway through Kalyazin Tver province. Kalyazin, 1915.

== Archives ==
- Moscow Central State Archive. MF 1434. Op.1. The board of society of the Verkhne-Volzhskaya (Upper Volga) railway. 1914–1917. Dd.1-10.
- State Archive of St. Petersburg. F.-9346. Op.1. Department of Construction of the Upper Volga Railway - Committee of Public Institutions of the Supreme Economic Council of the RSFSR (1917 - [1921]). Dd. 158. 1917-1921 yy.
- RGIA. F.350. Plans and drawings for the construction of railways (collection). Op.77. Verkhne-Volzhskaya (Upper Volga) railway, etc. 1873-1917 yy.
