= Antique Airfield =

- IATA: none; ICAO: none; FAA LID: IA27

Summary
- Airport type: Private
- Owner/Operator: Airpower Museum and Robert L. Taylor
- Location: 3 miles NE of Blakesburg, Iowa
- Elevation AMSL: 890 ft (270 m)
- Coordinates: 40°58′40.0460″N 092°35′15.68″W
- Website: https://antiqueairfieldia27.com/
- Interactive map of Antique Airfield

Runways
Direction	Length		Surface
Direction	ft	m	Surface
18/36	2,350	716	Turf

Antique Airfield is a private use airfield located three miles northeast of Blakesburg, Iowa. It is owned and operated by Robert L. Taylor and the Airpower Museum. It is the home of the Antique Airplane Association, Inc., the Airpower Museum, Inc., and the APM Library of Flight.

== Airpower Museum ==
The Airpower Museum is a 20,000-square-foot (1,900 m^{2}) aviation museum on Antique Airfield. It was founded in 1965 by Robert L. Taylor and the Antique Airplane Association, and features various periods of aviation through models, engines, propellers, photos and original art. Approximately 25 aircraft are on display, including warbirds from World War II.

=== Museum Collection ===
The Airpower Museum's collection of aircraft includes:

- Aeronca C-3
- Aeronca K
- Aeronca 65CA Super Chief
- Aeronca 65TC (0-58B) (L-3B)
- Aeronca 7AC Champion
- Aeronca 11AC Chief
- American Eagle Eaglet B-31
- Arrow Sport F
- Backstrom WPB-1 Flying Plank II
- BD-5
- Bölkow Bo 208A-1 Junior
- Bounsall Super Prospector
- Brewster-Fleet B-1
- Culver Cadet LCA (LFA)
- Culver PQ-14 Cadet
- Fleet 7
- Funk Model B
- Great Lakes 2T-1A
- Hall Cherokee II
- Mooney M-18 Mite
- Morrisey Bravo
- Pietenpol Aircamper
- Pietenpol Sky Scout
- Piper L-4 Cub
- Porterfield CP-40
- Rearwin Cloudster
- Rearwin Skyranger 190F
- Rearwin Sportster
- Republic RC-3 Seabee
- Rose Parakeet A-1
- Ryan STA
- Ryan PT-22 Recruit
- Smith DSA-1 Miniplane
- Stinson 10
- Stinson Junior S
- Volmer VJ-23 Swingwing
- Welch OW-8

== See also ==
- Iowa Aviation Museum
