= ACE Aircraft Falcon =

Falcon

General information
- Manufacturer: ACE Air-Craft (Air-Craft Corporation of America)
- Designer: Orin Moore Welch

History
- Variant: Welch OW-5M

The ACE Aircraft Falcon Cabin Coupe was a light, low cost aircraft built during the Great Depression.

== Design ==
The Falcon is a two-place, strut-braced high-wing conventional geared aircraft. The fuselage is constructed of welded steel tubing and fabric covering. The engine was a 42 hp two cylinder model made by ACE. A Continental A40 could be purchased for an extra $200.

== Specifications ==
Data from Popular aviation

General characteristics

- Crew: 1
- Capacity: 1
- Length: 20 ft 6 in (6.25 m)
- Wingspan: 36 ft (11 m)
- Height: 5 ft 8 in (1.73 m)
- Powerplant: 1 × ACE 2 Cylinder horizontally opposed, 42 hp (31 kW)
- Propellers: 2-bladed

Performance

- Maximum speed: 71 kn (82 mph, 132 km/h)
- Cruise speed: 65 kn (75 mph, 121 km/h)
- Minimum control speed: 24 kn (28 mph, 45 km/h)

== See also ==
Related development

- Welch OW-5M

Aircraft of comparable role, configuration, and era

- Aeronca C-3
