= Airports for antique aircraft =

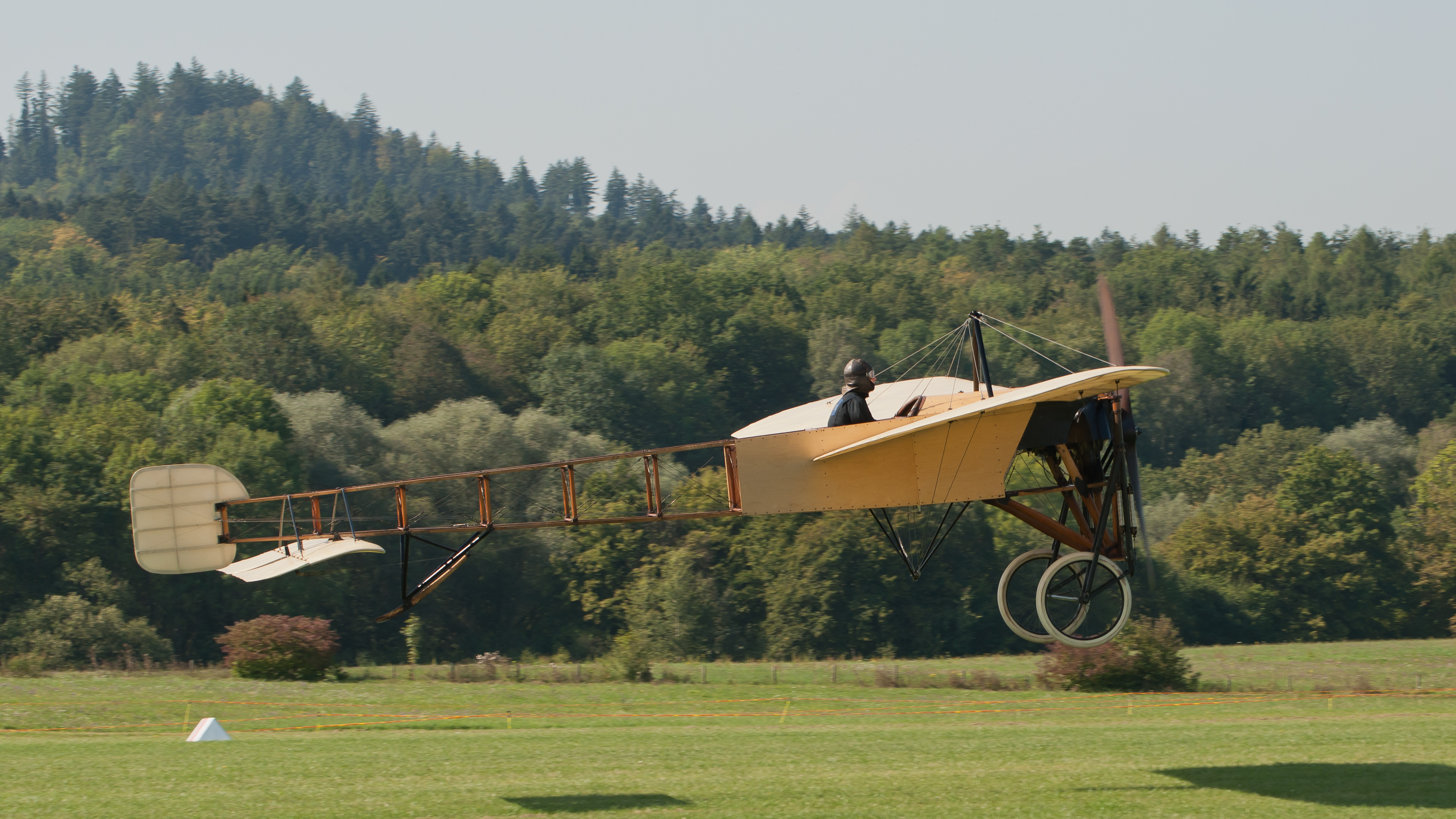
A restored Blériot XI Thulin A 1910 on its first takeoff after restoration in 1991

Airports for antique airplanes are aerodromes with facilities appropriate to the aircraft of the early twentieth century, including, for example, turf runways. In many cases they are collocated with aircraft museums.

Aircraft built before the end of World War I had different requirements for the landing field than modern aircraft. Modern runways are built for maximum friction. Antique aircraft, sensitive to crosswinds and often equipped with skids, benefit from a relatively slippery turf field. Aircraft museums often have turf runways to accommodate the old aircraft.

== Examples ==
Examples include the following:

- Old Rhinebeck Aerodrome
- Antiquers Aerodrome
- Bayport Aerodrome
- Old Warden Aerodrome
- Pioneer Airport
- Fantasy of Flight
- Duxford Aerodrome
- Antique Airfield
- Great War Flying Museum at Brampton-Caledon Airport
- Estonian Aviation Museum
- Classic Flyers Museum at Tauranga Airport
- Omaka Aviation Heritage Centre at Omaka Aerodrome
- Museo del Aire (Madrid) at Cuatro Vientos Airport

== See also ==
- Index of aviation articles
