= Aeronca C-1 Cadet =

C-1 Cadet
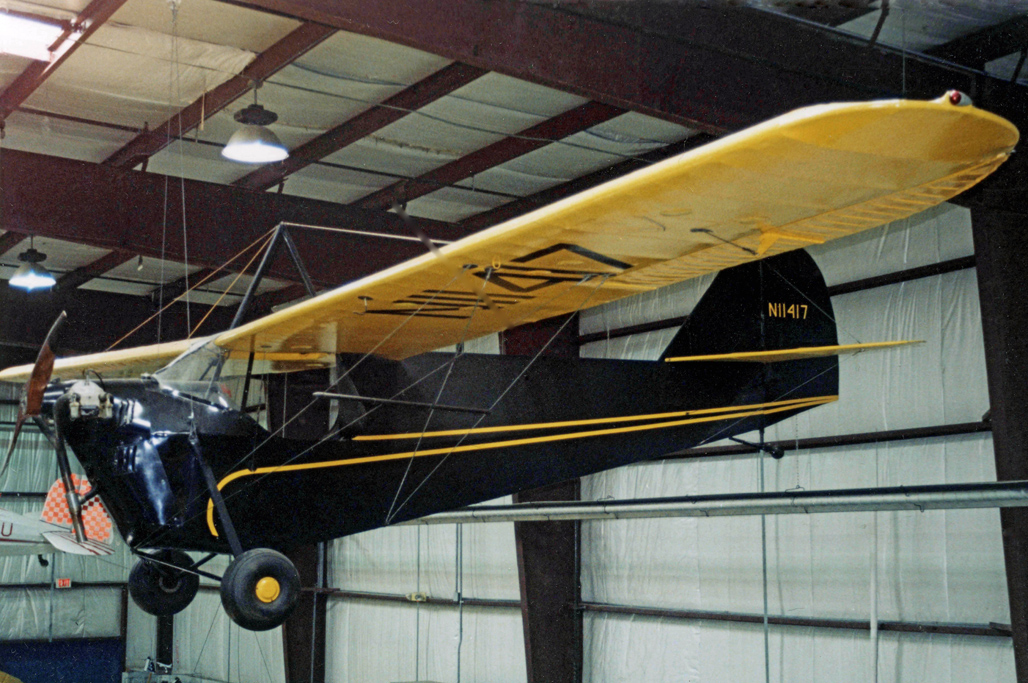
- The final remaining C-1, converted to a C-2N

General information
- Type: Single-seat light sport aircraft
- National origin: United States
- Manufacturer: Aeronca
- Number built: 3

History
- First flight: 1931

The Aeronca C-1 Cadet was a high performance version of the Aeronca C-2 developed by Aeronca and first flown in 1931.

== Development ==
The C-1 was a wire-braced high-wing monoplane with a fixed tail skid landing gear and powered by a 36 hp (27 kW) Aeronca E-113 flat-twin piston engine. Apart from a more powerful engine the C-1 also had a strengthened fuselage and reduced span wings compared with the C-2. Only three were built and following the death of a company executive when the prototype crashed, one was scrapped and the other was converted into an Aeronca C-2N.

== Specifications ==
Data from Orbis

General characteristics

- Crew: 1
- Wingspan: 29 ft 0 in (8.84 m)
- Wing area: 115 sq ft (10.7 m^{2})
- Empty weight: 426 lb (193 kg)
- Max takeoff weight: 700 lb (318 kg)
- Powerplant: 1 × Aeronca E-113 flat-twin piston, 36 hp (27 kW)

Performance

- Maximum speed: 95 mph (153 km/h, 83 kn)
- Cruise speed: 80 mph (130 km/h, 70 kn)
- Service ceiling: 12,500 ft (3,800 m)

== See also ==
Related development

- Aeronca C-2
