= Aeronca Museum =

Coordinates: 42°34′01″N 83°46′59″W

The Aeronca Museum is an online museum that hosts a collection of artifacts and aircraft produced by Aeronca (the Aeronautical Corporation of America) (a.k.a. Aeronca, Inc. or Aeronca Aircraft, now Magellan Aerospace Corp.), a prominent U.S. light aircraft manufacturer from 1928 to 1951. The museum is instituted to "preserve the knowledge and history of Aeronca aircraft in the public trust" and keep it "available for future generations," with the objective "to be the premier research library for all things Aeronca."

== History ==
The museum began its development under President and Executive Director Todd Trainor, an aircraft restoration specialist, long involved with Aeronca planes, and son of late Aeronca restoration expert Tom Trainor.

A board was formed and the organization applied for 501(C)3 non-profit certification in early 2011; it holds that status now, and is currently operating as a public information service.

At present, the artifacts are at the museum's offices in Brighton, Michigan, and in hangars at the Brighton Airport, some undergoing restoration and preparation for presentation.

Currently, the museum largely serves as an archive of thousands of documents, drawings and blueprints, technical manuals and other research references related to Aeronca aircraft, and presents these online through its website, both commercially and as free-distribution information for Aeronca aircraft operators and enthusiasts.

== Exhibits and artifacts ==
The museum is home to three complete Aeronca K projects (including one seaplane), one flyable Aeronca TAC, a C-3 basket case, and a KCA basket case, some in restoration—and over 10,000 other Aeronca artifacts and papers.

The museum has collected many documents, drawings, blueprints, manuals and other references from Aeronca, and from its successor, Magellan Aerospace, and from Aeronca enthusiasts, particularly those affiliated with the National Aeronca Association and the Fearless Aeronca Aviators, and makes them available through its website, at aeroncamuseum.org.

== See also ==
- Aeronca Aircraft
- EAA Aviation Museum

== Links ==
- Aeronca Museum - official site
- "Aeronca History" page, Aeronca, Inc. corporate website
- The Aeronca K and Aeronca Engines website (author/webmaster Todd Trainor)
- Aeronca 11AC Chief website
- National Aeronca Association
- Aeronca Aviators Club
- Fearless Aeronca Aviators
