= Peyret-Nessler Avionette =

1920s French aircraft

General information
- Type: Sports aircraft
- National origin: France
- Manufacturer: Peyret-Nessler
- Number built: 1

History
- First flight: 1927

The Peyret-Nessler Avionette was a French sports aircraft built in the mid 1920s. It featured a parasol monoplane layout.

== Specifications ==
Data from Avionette : Avionette Peyret-Nessler

General characteristics

- Crew: 1
- Length: 6.00 m (19 ft 8 in)
- Wingspan: 10.50 m (34 ft 5 in)
- Wing area: 20.00 m^{2} (215.3 sq ft)
- Empty weight: 150 kg (331 lb)
- Gross weight: 240 kg (529 lb)
- Powerplant: 1 × Salmson 3 Ad 3-cylinder air-cooled radial piston engine, 12 kW (16 hp)
- Propellers: 2-bladed fixed-pitch propeller

Performance

- Maximum speed: 95 km/h (59 mph, 51 kn)
- Service ceiling: 500 m (1,600 ft)
- Time to altitude: 500 m (1,600 ft) in 6 minutes 33 seconds
