= Szekely SR-3 =

SR-3
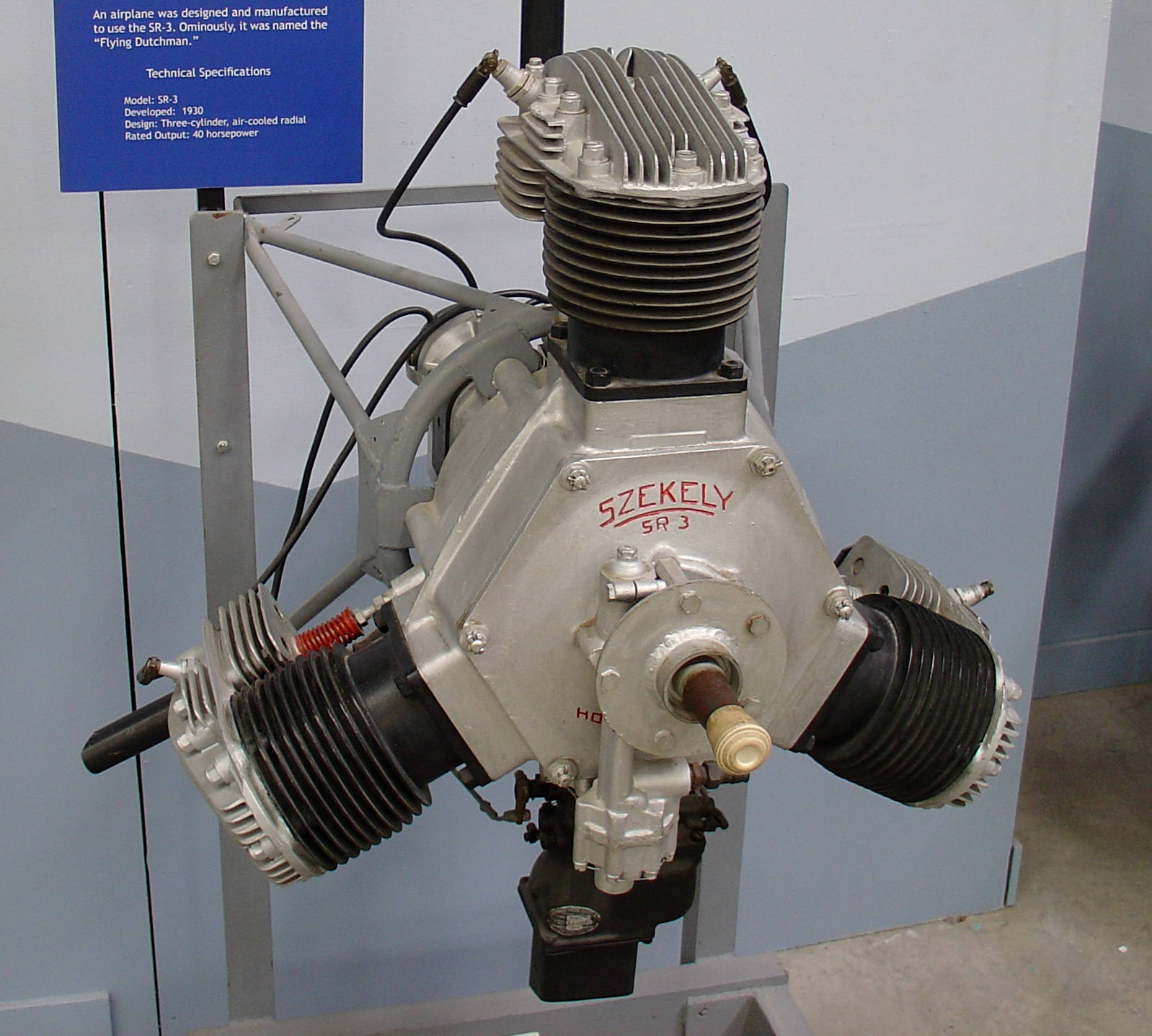
- SR-3 Model L - Flathead version of the Szekely SR-3 aircraft engine, Pima Air & Space Museum
- Type: Radial engine
- Manufacturer: Szekely

Szekely aircraft engines were three-cylinder radial engines built in Holland, Michigan in the 1920s and 30s. They were used to power small aircraft such as the Rearwin Junior, Taylor H-2 and American Eagle Eaglet. Often criticized for reliability issues and design flaws, many were replaced with better engines in their original airframes. Few examples still exist but a museum quality example is on display in the Holland Museum in Holland, Michigan.

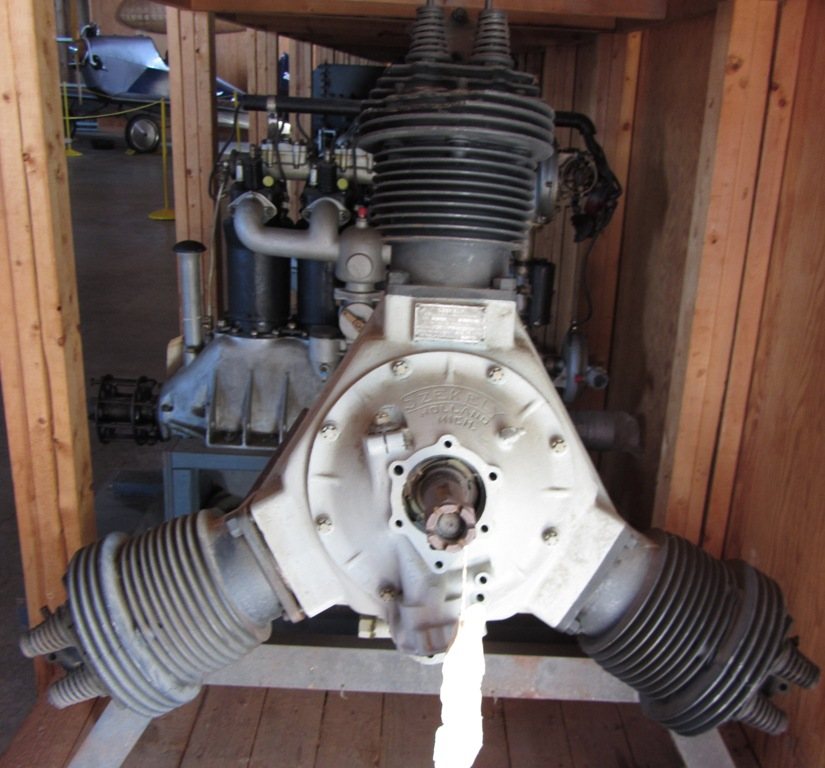
SR-3 Model O - overhead-valve version of the Szekely 3-cylinder radial engine

== Variants ==
Data from:Jane's all the World's Aircraft 1931

SR-3 O
Overhead valve combustion chamber, compression ratio 4.6:1, 45 hp (34 kW) at 1,750 rpm.
SR-3 L
Side-valve combustion chamber, compression ratio 5:1, 30 hp (22 kW) at 1,750 rpm.

== Applications ==
- American Eagle Eaglet
- Buhl Bull Pup
- Curtiss-Wright Junior
- Lambach HL.1
- Nicholson Junior KN-2
- Prest Baby Pursuit
- Rearwin Junior
- Taylor H-2

== Specifications (SR-3 Model O) ==
Data from American Engine Specifications, Jane's all the World's Aircraft 1938, Jane's all the World's Aircraft 1931

=== General characteristics ===
- Type: Three-cylinder radial engine
- Bore: 4 1/8 in (105 mm)
- Stroke: 4 3/4 in (121 mm)
- Displacement: 191 cu in (3.13 L)
- Length: 25 in (635 mm) overall
- Diameter: 36 in (914 mm) (Model L 30 in (760 mm))
- Dry weight: 147 lb (67 kg)

=== Components ===
- Valvetrain: one camshaft per cylinder: pushrod-operated overhead inlet outlet valves, one each per cylinder; (Model L valves directly operated by tappets.)
- Fuel system: Stromberg NA-S3 Carburetor or Zenith equivalent
- Cooling system: Air-cooled
- Bosch FU6/3 or Scintilla magnetoes

=== Performance ===
- Power output: 45 hp (34 kW) at 1,750 rpm
- Specific fuel consumption: 0.60 lb/(hp·h) [0.365 kg/(kW·h)]
- Oil consumption: 0.16 lb/(hp·h)

== See also ==
Comparable engines

- Blackburne Thrush
- Bristol Lucifer
- Salmson AD.3

Related lists

- List of aircraft engines
