= Nicholson Junior KN-2 =

Junior KN-2
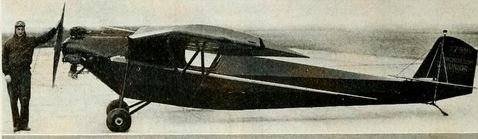

General information
- Type: Low power, two seat civil monoplane
- National origin: United States
- Manufacturer: Kenny Flying Services
- Designer: Hugh G. Nicholson
- Number built: 1

History
- First flight: early 1931

The Nicholson Junior KN-2 was a low power, high wing, two seat, cabin monoplane intended for sport or flight training in the United States in the late 1920s. Only one was built.

== Design and development ==
The Junior KN-2 (KN came from the initials of builder Kenny and designer Nicholson) was a high wing monoplane with 5° of sweep and 1.5° of dihedral. The fabric-covered wings used the popular, flat-bottomed Clark Y profile and were built around laminated spars, aluminium alloy (Hyblum) ribs and steel tube drag struts. The ailerons were of the Frise type and had dural structures. The wings could be folded for transport or storage.

The fuselage was a Chromium-Molybdenum steel tube structure of Warren truss form and was fabric-covered. The engine was nose-mounted, with a choice between the Continental A40 flat four and the Szekely SR-3 three cylinder radial engines. Both provided about 40 hp (30 kW). The Junior's two seat cabin was under the wing and provided two side-by-side seats with dual control. Behind the wing the fuselage tapered to the tail with the tailplane mounted on top, wire-braced from a triangular fin which carried a broad and largely straight-edged rudder.

The Junior's landing gear was fixed and conventional, with a long tailskid. It had Goodyear Airwheel mainwheels, with large, low pressure tyres on split axles with semi-oleo landing struts from the upper fuselage longerons and drag struts from the lower longerons. The wheeled undercarriage was designed so it could be easily replaced by floats.

Its benign flight characteristics had been established by June 1931 but with the Great Depression deepening, only one was completed.

== Specifications ==
Data from Aero Digest, July 1931

General characteristics

- Crew: one
- Capacity: one passenger or student
- Length: 23 ft (7.0 m)
- Wingspan: 37 ft (11 m)
- Wing area: 190 sq ft (18 m^{2}) plus 21.5 sq ft (2.00 m^{2}) ailerons
- Airfoil: Clark Y
- Empty weight: 540 lb (245 kg)
- Gross weight: 980 lb (445 kg)
- Fuel capacity: 11 US gal (9.2 imp gal; 42 L)
- Powerplant: 1 × Continental A40 flat four or Szekely SR-3 3 cylinder radial engine , 40 hp (30 kW) approximately. Source does not state which engine led to the given performance figures.
- Propellers: 2-bladed

Performance

- Maximum speed: 85 mph (137 km/h, 74 kn)
- Cruise speed: 75 mph (121 km/h, 65 kn)
- Landing speed: 28 mph (45 km/h; 24 kn)
- Take-off time: 8 s
- Range: 315 mi (507 km, 274 nmi)
- Service ceiling: 10,000 ft (3,000 m)
- Maximum glide ratio: 12:1
- Rate of climb: 650 ft/min (3.3 m/s) initial
