= Curtiss-Wright Junior =

CR-1 Skeeter, CW-1 Junior
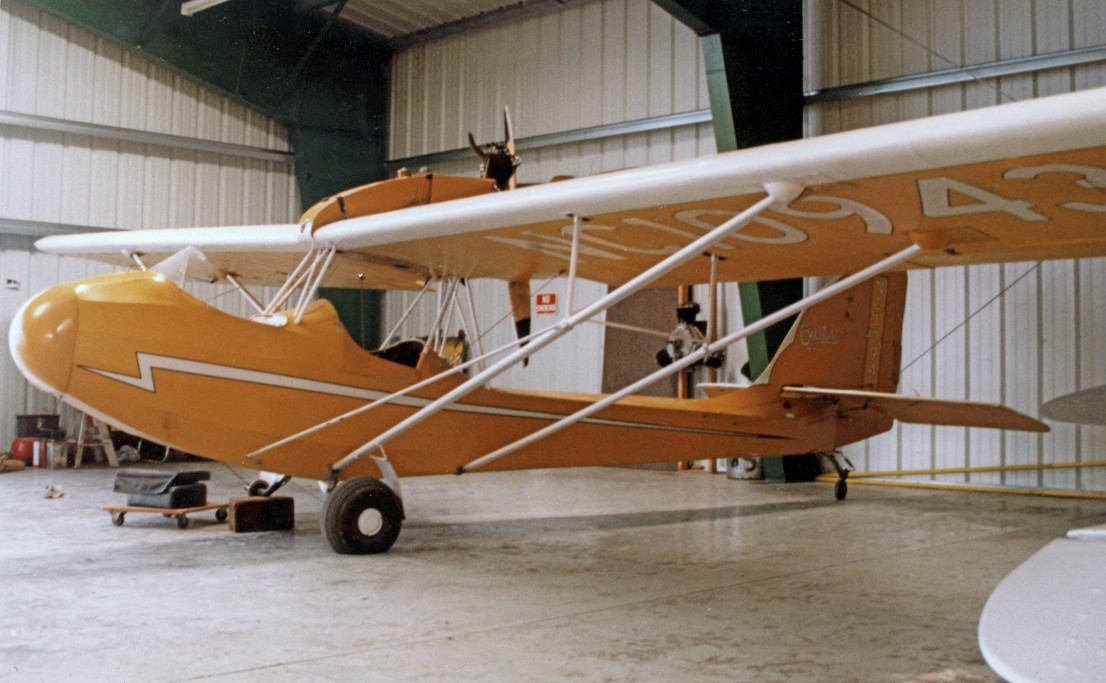
- 1931-built CW-1 Junior at Carson City airport Nevada in 1989

General information
- Type: Sports plane
- Manufacturer: Curtiss-Robertson, Curtiss-Wright
- Designer: Karl White, Walter Beech, H. Lloyd Child
- Status: Several still flying (2012)
- Number built: approx. 270

History
- First flight: 5 October 1930

The Curtiss-Wright CW-1 Junior, originally named the Curtiss-Robertson CR-1 Skeeter is a light sports aircraft produced in the United States in the 1930s. It had been intended to sell it for the price of a mid-range automobile.

The Junior had two problems which brought production to a halt: its three-cylinder Szekely SR-3 radial engine tended to throw its cylinders, made more serious by the pusher configuration; and the unexpected location of the propeller caused accidents to people walking up to the plane on the ground. Some Juniors were still being flown in 2012.

== Design and production ==
Designed as a minimalist, affordable aircraft, the Junior was marketed as "built to sell for the price of an automobile in the medium price class". Curtiss-Robertson's plans to produce such an aircraft were driven by the imminent arrival of the Aeronca C-2 and American Eagle Eaglet on the market. Hoping to compete in the same class, the company purchased the rights to the Snyder Buzzard but soon discovered that it simply could not be made to perform well enough. To replace it, the Skeeter was produced as an all-new design that retained the Buzzard's basic configuration. The aircraft featured a fuselage of square cross-section made from steel tube covered in fabric. The top of the fuselage was left open to create an open cockpit for the pilot and a passenger sitting in tandem. The tiny pusher engine was mounted to the upper surface of a parasol wing. The undercarriage was of the fixed, tailwheel type.

By the time the aircraft was ready to market in 1931, Curtiss-Robertson's parent company, Curtiss, had merged into Curtiss-Wright, and the Skeeter was awarded the new designation and name CW-1 Junior. Sales were brisk through 1931, with some 270 aircraft sold at $1,490 each, but the success did not last long. The pusher propeller arrangement was the source of two serious problems. First, the chosen powerplant, the three-cylinder Szekely SR-3 radial engine had a noted tendency to throw cylinders. In the pusher design, this resulted in the cylinder passing through the propeller. While Junior owners solved this problem by wrapping a steel cable around the engine so that any thrown cylinder would stay in place until the aircraft was safely on the ground (some sources imply that the steel cable was also added to dampen engine vibrations, and thus reduce the failure rate), the second problem was not so easily solved. The Junior's low stance on the ground and the presence of a propeller in a position where people were not used to finding one led to a number of accidents where people on the ground (particularly passengers disembarking the aircraft) simply walked into the spinning propeller. These issues, combined with a highly publicised fatal crash, spelled the end of the Junior's marketability. By early 1932, sales had virtually stopped, and Curtiss-Wright's head office decided to end production.

== Operational history ==
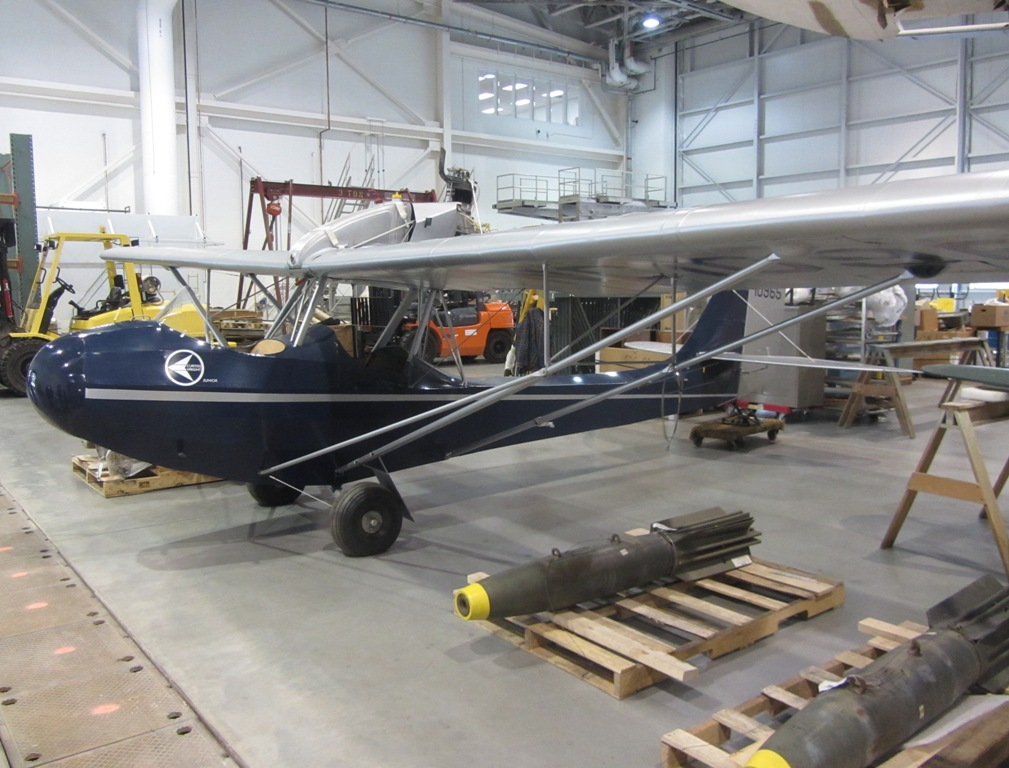
Curtiss-Wright Junior at the Udvar Hazy Center

Several Juniors were still flown by private pilot owners in 2012. A number of Juniors are preserved as museum aircraft, some in flying condition. Collections containing examples include the National Air and Space Museum, Fantasy of Flight, Old Rhinebeck Aerodrome, Yesterday's Flyers and the Pioneer Flight Museum. The Pioneer flight museum's example is one of a few experimentally fitted with the French 40 hp (30 kW) Salmson AD-9 radial engine. The fuel tank on this example is cone shaped.

== Specifications ==
Data from Curtiss Aircraft 1907–1947

General characteristics

- Crew: 1
- Capacity: 1 passenger
- Length: 21 ft 3 in (6.48 m)
- Wingspan: 39 ft 6 in (12.04 m)
- Height: 7 ft 4 in (2.24 m)
- Wing area: 176 sq ft (16.4 m^{2})
- Airfoil: Curtiss CR-1
- Empty weight: 570 lb (259 kg)
- Gross weight: 975 lb (442 kg)
- Powerplant: 1 × Szekely SR-3 3-cylinder air-cooled radial piston engine, 45 hp (34 kW)
- Propellers: 2-bladed fixed-pitch pusher propeller

Performance

- Maximum speed: 80 mph (130 km/h, 70 kn)
- Range: 200 mi (320 km, 170 nmi)
- Service ceiling: 12,000 ft (3,700 m)
- Rate of climb: 600 ft/min (3.0 m/s)

== See also ==
Aircraft of comparable role, configuration, and era

- Aeronca C-2
- American Eagle Eaglet
- Rearwin Junior
- Spartan C2
