= Aeronca E-107 =

1920s American piston aircraft engine

E-107
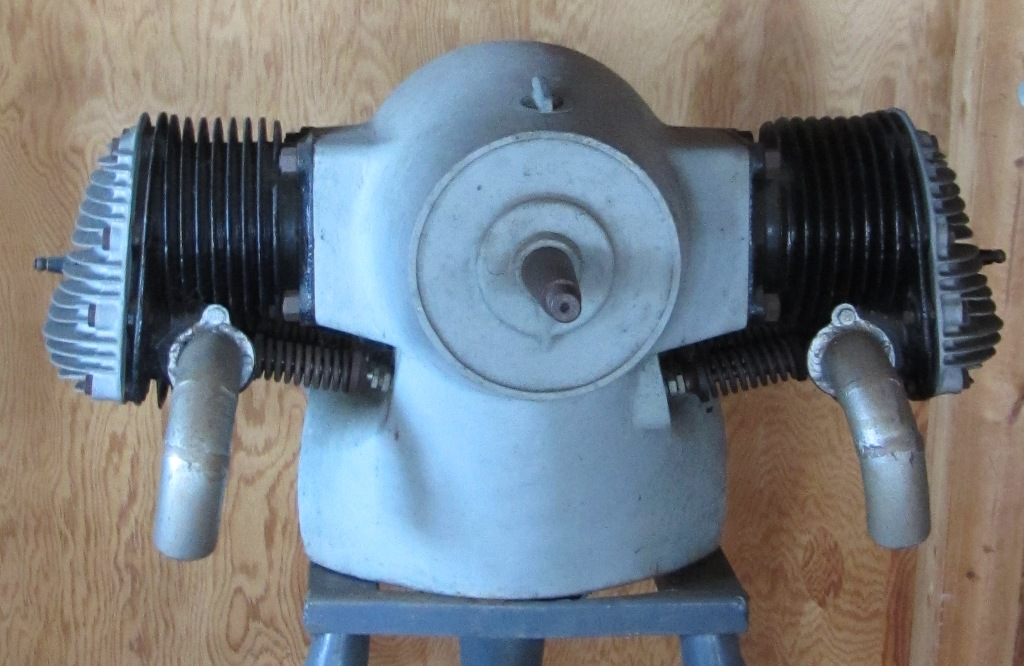
- E107 on display
- Type: Flat-twin aircraft engine
- National origin: United States of America
- Manufacturer: Aeronautical Corporation of America
- Designer: Ray Poole and Robert Galloway
- First run: 1929
- Major applications: Aeronca C-2
- Number built: 115
- Variants: Aeronca E-113

The Aeronca E-107 was one of the first low-cost reliable engines of the post-World War I era.

== Design and development ==
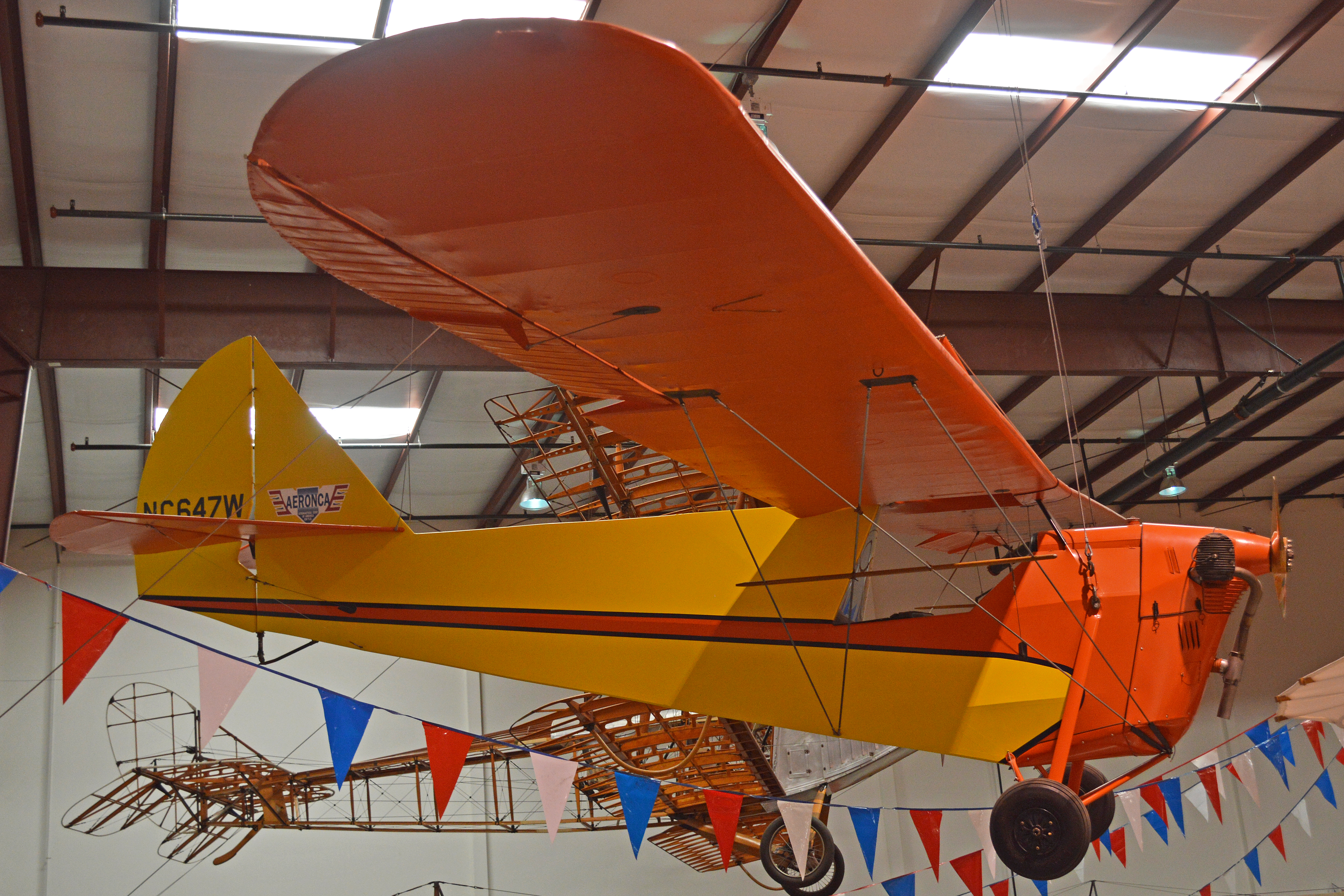
An Aeronca C-2, with the E-107 "flathead" engine

The E-107A was a production aviation flathead engine designed to replace a Morehouse engine on the first prototype of the Aeronca C-2. The first five were produced without cooling fins on the crankcase, but with all versions having air-cooling fins atop the cylinder heads, similar to many air-cooled two-stroke engines in appearance. A Winfleld Model 5 carburetor was standard for the engine. The E-107 was replaced by the uprated, overhead valvetrain E-113 engine based on the same design.

== Variants ==
E-107
Standard production engine
E-107A
The E-107A was produced for Aeronca by the Govro-Nelson Company of Detroit, Michigan.
O-107
Designation given to engines fitted to impressed aircraft

== Applications ==
- Aeronca C-2
- Pickering-Pearson KP.2

== Engines on display ==
- An E-107 is on display at the EAA Airventure Museum in Oshkosh, Wisconsin
- The restored first prototype Aeronca C-2 (registration NC626N) fitted with an E-107 is on display at the Udvar-Hazy building of the Smithsonian's National Air and Space Museum.

== Specifications (E-107) ==
Data from

=== General characteristics ===
- Type: 2-cyl. air-cooled horizontally opposed flathead engine
- Bore: 4.5 in (110 mm)
- Stroke: 4 in (100 mm)
- Displacement: 107 cubic inches
- Dry weight: 114 lb (52 kg)

=== Components ===
- Valvetrain: One inlet and one exhaust valve per cylinder, operated by tappets directly from the camshaft
- Oil system: scavenged pressure feed.
- Cooling system: air-cooled

=== Performance ===
- Power output: 30 hp (22 kW) maximum at 2,500 rpm, (cruising at 2000 rpm)
- Compression ratio: 4:1
- Specific fuel consumption: 0.55 lb/hp (0.33 kg/kW)/hr at 2,000 rpm
- Oil consumption: 0.21 lb/hp (0.13 kg/kW)/hr

== See also ==
Comparable engines

- Bristol Cherub
- Lawrance A-3

Related lists

- List of aircraft engines
