= Welch O-2 =

O-2
- Type: Horizontally Opposed Piston Engine
- National origin: United States
- Manufacturer: Orin Welch Aircraft Company
- Designer: Orin Moore Welch
- First run: 1931
- Major applications: Welch OW-7M
- Number built: 7

The Welch O-2 is a light two-cylinder engine developed for the Welch OW-7M series of aircraft.

== Specifications (O-2) ==
=== General characteristics ===
- Type: air-cooled 2-cylinder horizontally opposed aircraft piston engine
- Bore: 4.5 in
- Stroke: 4.25 in
- Displacement: 135 in³
- Dry weight: 115 lb

=== Components ===
- Oil system: dry sump
- Cooling system: Air-cooled

=== Performance ===
- Power output: 41hp at 2,300 rpm
- Compression ratio: 5.2:1

== See also ==
- Aeronca E-113
