= Robert L. Taylor (aviator) =

American aviator (1924–2020)

Robert Leo Taylor
- Born: July 2, 1924; Ottumwa, Iowa
- Died: June 20, 2020
- Occupation: aviator
- Known for: Antique Airplane Association

Robert Leo Taylor (July 2, 1924 – June 20, 2020) was an American aviation pioneer who was the founder and president of the Antique Airplane Association Inc. He was also co-founder and Chairman of the Board of the Airpower Museum with which organization he shared ownership of Antique Airfield in Blakesburg, Iowa.

Taylor was born in Ottumwa, Iowa, in July 1924.

For the majority of Taylor's life, he was involved in aviation. In 1941 he soloed and then served in both World War II (US Army Air Forces) and the Korean War. He worked as an aircraft mechanic and airport manager in addition to buying and selling airplanes and restoring them.

In 1994, Taylor was inducted into the Iowa Aviation Museum's Aviation Hall of Fame for his establishment of the Antique Airplane Association in 1953 for providing a place and a purpose to fly, to preserve, to share and to promote the early flying machines.

Taylor still resided in Ottumwa during his latter years, where he published a national and international magazine featuring articles and stories about antique airplanes. He died in June 2020 at the age of 95.
