= Aeronca K =

1937 American utility aircraft

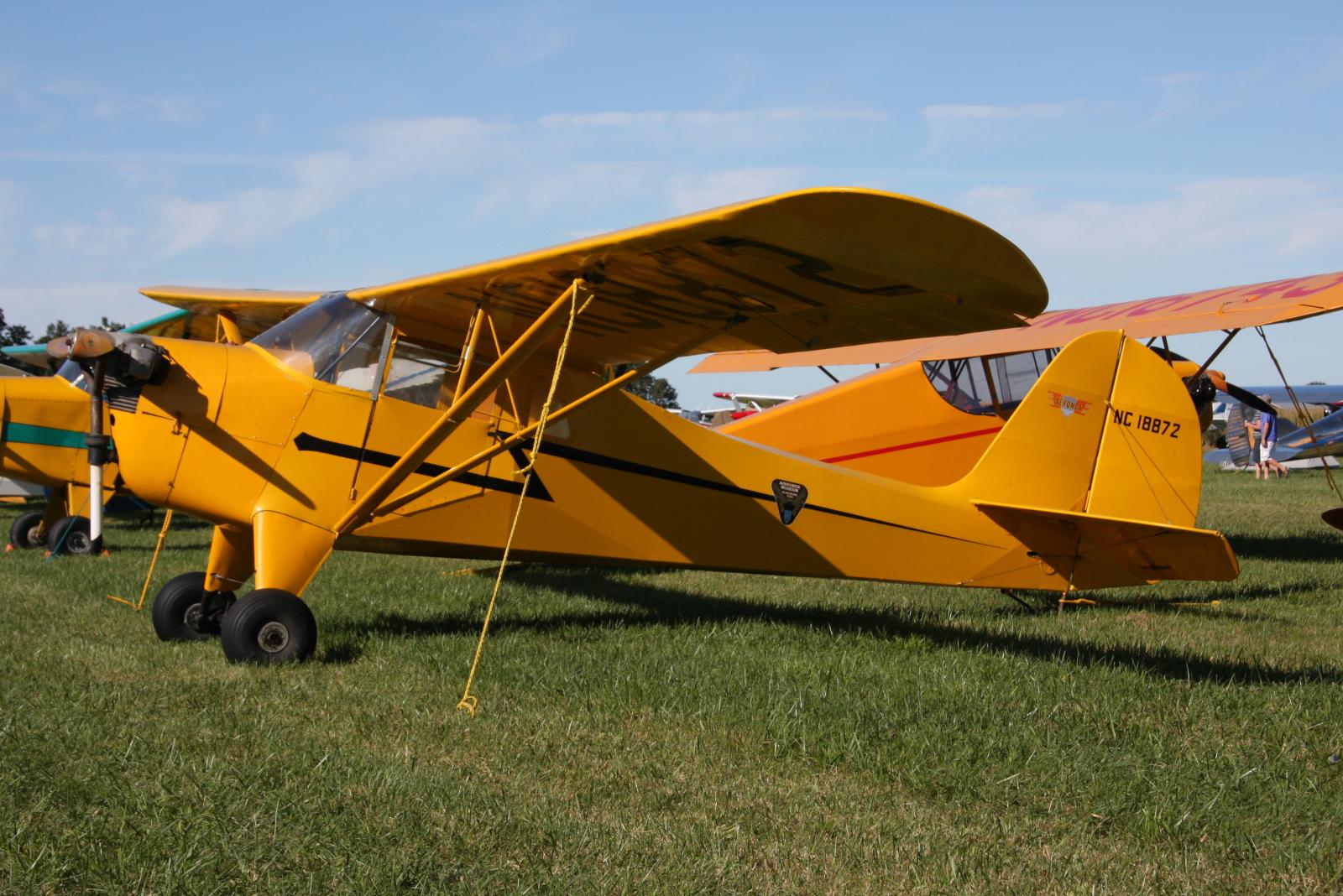
- Aeronca K

General information
- National origin: United States of America
- Manufacturer: Aeronca
- Designer: Jean A. Roche
- Status: Still in service
- Primary user: Private pilot owners
- Number built: 357

History
- Introduction date: 1937
- Developed from: Aeronca C-2

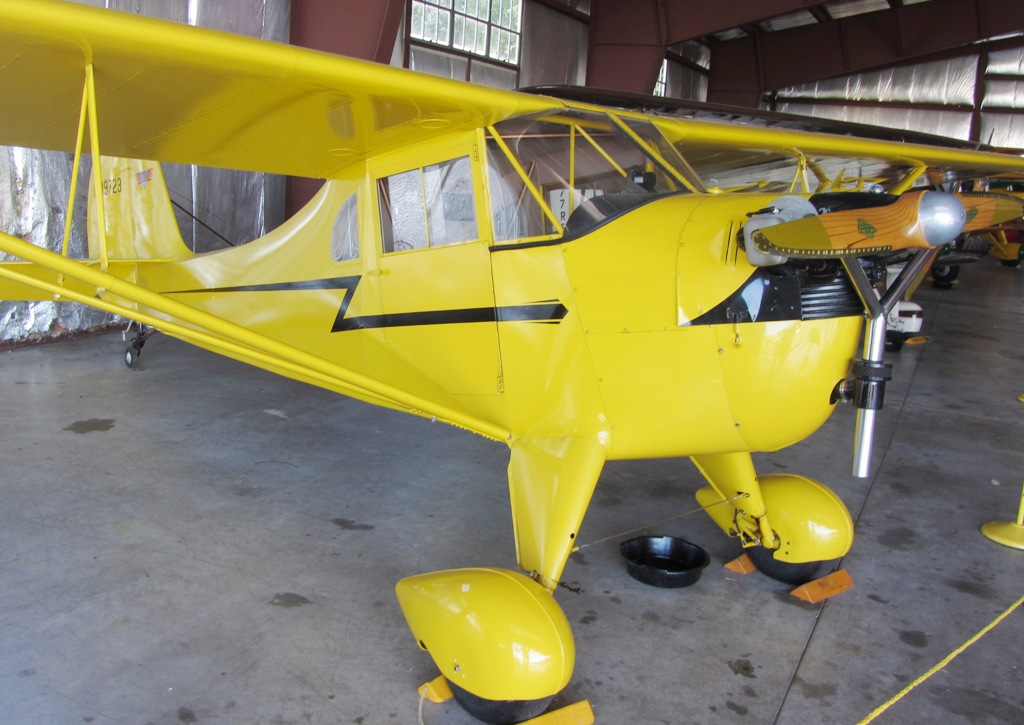
Aeronca K

The Aeronca Model K Scout is an American light airplane first marketed in 1937, and was the true successor to the popular C-2/C-3 line.

== Design ==
In January 1937, Aeronca unveiled the Model K, a replacement for the company's popular C-3. While it was powered by the same Aeronca E-113 two-cylinder engine as the C-3, the Model K Scout was of more conventional appearance, eliminating the C-3's distinctive fuselage "bathtub", replacing the wire-braced wings used by the earlier aircraft with strut-braced wings and providing a fully enclosed cockpit seating two side-by-side. The fuselage had a welded steel-tube structure with fabric covering, while the wings had spruce spars and spruce and plywood ribs, which were fabric covered. The aircraft had a fixed tailwheel undercarriage, where the wheels could be replaced with skis for winter operation, while there was also a floatplane version. Dual controls were fitted.

Later in 1937, Aeronca unveiled a new version of the Model K powered by the 4-cylinder Continental A-40 engine, the Aeronca KC, while a similar version powered by the 4-cylinder Franklin 4AC-150 engine became the Aeronca CF. The availability of the more powerful Continental A-50 engine resulted in the Aeronca KCA. This was later developed into the slightly larger Aeronca 50 Chief. Small numbers of 50 hp Model Ks powered by Menasco M-50 flat-four engines (the KM) and Franklin engines (the KF) were also built.

A total of 357 Aeronca Model K Scouts were built. (Note: Juptner states "350 or more" Model Ks, 35 KCs and 6 CFs, "about 65" KCAs, nine KMs, and five KFs.)

== Operational history ==
73 Model K were on the U.S. civil aircraft register in May 2009 and several examples are preserved in museums. The EAA AirVenture Museum in Oshkosh, Wisconsin has an example on display at its Pioneer Airport. N18877 is on display at the Yanks Air Museum in Chino, CA.

== Variants ==
- Model K Scout - with 40 hp (30 kW) Aeronca E-113C engine, with 42 hp (31 kW) Aeronca E-113CB or CD engines and 45 hp (34 kW) E-113CDB engines as options.
  - Model KS Sea Scout - Seaplane version of K, with EDO floats.
- Model KC - with 40 hp (30 kW) Continental A-40 engine and modified undercarriage.
- Model CF - Similar to KC but powered by 40 hp (30 kW) Franklin 4AC-150 engine.
- Model KCA - Modified KC with 50 hp (37 kW) Continental A-50 engine.
- Model KM - KC powered by 50 hp (37 kW) Menasco M-50 flat-four engine.
- Model KF - As CF but with Franklin 4AC-150 uprated to 50 hp (37 kW).

== Specifications ==
Data from U.S. Civil Aircraft Vol. 7

General characteristics

- Crew: 1
- Capacity: 1 passenger
- Length: 20 ft 7 in (6.27 m)
- Wingspan: 36 ft 0 in (10.97 m)
- Height: 6 ft 7 in (2.01 m)
- Wing area: 146.35 sq ft (13.596 m^{2})
- Airfoil: Clark Y
- Empty weight: 590 lb (268 kg)
- Max takeoff weight: 1,040 lb (472 kg)
- Fuel capacity: 10 US gal (8.3 imp gal; 38 L)
- Powerplant: 1 × Aeronca E-113CB air-cooled flat-twin piston engine, 42 hp (31 kW)

Performance

- Maximum speed: 93 mph (150 km/h, 81 kn) at sea level
- Cruise speed: 85 mph (137 km/h, 74 kn)
- Stall speed: 38 mph (61 km/h, 33 kn)
- Range: 255 mi (410 km, 222 nmi)
- Service ceiling: 12,000 ft (3,700 m)
- Rate of climb: 450 ft/min (2.3 m/s)

== See also ==
- Aeronca Chief family
