= Antiquers Aerodrome =

Coordinates: 26°27′58″N 80°9′37″W

Antiquers Aerodrome (FAA LID: FD08) is a private facility for antique planes, located at 6664 Skyline Drive, Delray Beach, Florida.
