= Snyder Buzzard =

General information
- Type: Ultralight motor glider
- National origin: United States
- Manufacturer: Motor Gliders Incorporated
- Designer: Bud Snyder

History
- First flight: 1930

The Snyder Buzzard was a light sport aircraft produced in the United States during the early 1930s. The designer/builder was Bud Snyder.

== Design and development ==
Designed to fill the lowest segment of the civil aviation market, the Buzzard was a single-seat single-engine fabric-covered aircraft of conventional configuration.

The wing was parasol-mounted. The 34 horsepower (25 kW) ABC Scorpion engine, mounted atop the wing, drove a pusher propeller

== Specifications ==
Data from

General characteristics

- Crew: 1
- Length: 19 ft 3 in (5.87 m)
- Wingspan: 35 ft 0 in (10.67 m)

Performance

- Maximum speed: 70 mph (112 km/h, 61 kn)
- Cruise speed: 60 mph (96 km/h, 52 kn)

== See also ==
Related development

- Curtiss-Wright CW-1 Junior

Aircraft of comparable role, configuration, and era

- BAC Drone
