= Peyret-Nessler Libellule =

1920s French light aircraft

Libellule
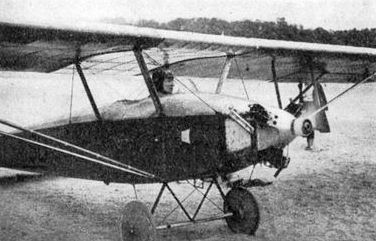

General information
- Type: Sports aircraft
- National origin: France
- Manufacturer: Louis Peyret
- Designer: Eric Nessler and Peyret
- Number built: 1

History
- First flight: mid-December 1927

The Peyret-Nessler Libellule (Dragonfly) was a French two-seat, low-powered (9 kW (12 hp)) parasol wing light aircraft built in 1927 to provide practical but economical flying. It was one of the first of these French avionettes.

== Design and development ==
Eric Nessler was well known as a French glider pilot and builder in the inter-war period and Louis Peyret was an experienced aircraft designer and constructor. Peyret had designed and built the tandem wing Peyret Alérion glider which won the first British gliding contest in 1922 and had also frequently collaborated with others, the Peyret-Le Prieur seaplane being one example. When Nessler began to consider the design of a very low-powered two-seat lightplane, Peyret was a natural choice of partner. The intention was to produce a practical aircraft with costs no greater than those of a car.

The three part parasol wing of the Libellule was rectangular in plan and without dihedral. Built around two box spars, its centre section was held high above the fuselage by pairs of parallel, outward-leaning struts from the spars at its extremities to the upper fuselage longerons and the outer panels were braced with duraluminum V-struts from the lower longerons out to the spars at about 60% span. The wing position had the advantage of keeping it largely clear of the prop wash and, by lowering the centre of gravity, increasing lateral stability. The centre section was entirely covered with Rhodoïd, a transparent material used to provide an uninterrupted upward view from the cockpits, and the outer panels covered with fabric. The Libellule's unusual ailerons, designed by Peyret, ran from the tips to about mid-span; mounted on the rear spar, they were divided span-wise into two roughly equal chord parts, hinged together and interconnected so that the rear surface had a greater deflection than the forward one, particularly in the case of upward deflections. The intention was to retain lateral control down to the lowest speeds.

The Libellule was powered by a 8.9 kW (12 hp) Salmson AD.3 three-cylinder radial engine within an aluminium cowling through which the cylinder heads projected for cooling. Behind the engine the wooden fuselage had a rectangular section, formed by four longerons with a series of frames. It was covered with 6 mm (0.24 in) thick plywood in the cockpit area under the wing but only 1 mm (0.04 in) thick further aft. Below the wing there was a single cockpit, 800 mm (31.5 in) long, with tandem seats for the pilot and his passenger behind. The passenger had a headrest which formed the start of an upper fuselage fairing, fabric-covered and running back to the tail. The vertical tail was rhomboidal in profile, with an unbalanced rudder. The horizontal tail was rectangular in plan and, like the ailerons, split spanwise into two moving sections with greater deflections at the rear.

The Libellule's landing gear was fixed and conventional with a track of 1.20 m (47.2 in). Its mainwheels were on a single axle, connected to the central and lower fuselage with a lateral, inverted, W-strut of profiled steel tubes, with rubber cord shock absorbers. Drag loads were countered with fore-and-aft wire bracing.

== Operational history ==
The sole Libellule was first flown in mid-December 1927 and in June 1928 gained its certificate of airworthiness. At the end of June it was displayed at Orly by Nessler and it returned there again in September for the light plane meeting. There were frequent discussions in France about the merits of low-power aircraft (avionettes in French) which cited the Libellue as an exemplar of the type. In 1930 it was offered for sale at a price of 35,000 francs and it remained active until at least late 1934.

== Specifications ==
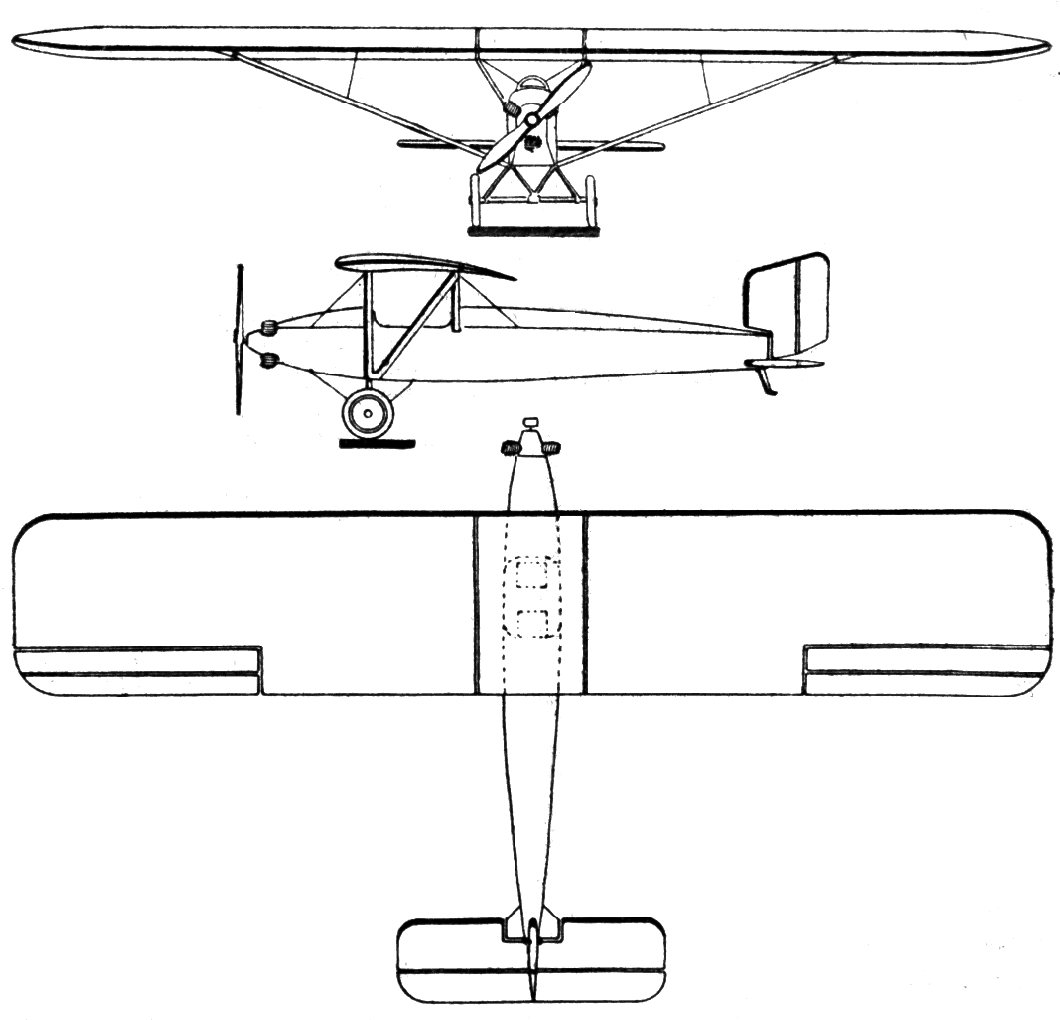
Peyret-Nessler Libellule 3-view drawing from Les Ailes May 10, 1928

Data from Les Ailes, May 1928

General characteristics

- Crew: One pilot
- Capacity: One passenger
- Length: 6 m (19 ft 8 in)
- Wingspan: 10.50 m (34 ft 5 in)
- Height: 1.93 m (6 ft 4 in)
- Wing area: 20 m^{2} (220 sq ft)
- Empty weight: 142 kg (313 lb)
- Gross weight: 277 kg (611 lb)
- Fuel capacity: 18 L (4.0 imp gal; 4.8 US gal)
- Powerplant: 1 × Salmson AD.3 3-cylinder radial, 8.9 kW (12 hp) at 1,800 rpm continuous
- Propellers: 2-bladed Levasseur, wooden, 1.60 m (5 ft 3 in) diameter

Performance

- Maximum speed: 95 km/h (59 mph, 51 kn) at ground level
- Stall speed: 40 km/h (25 mph, 22 kn) minimum speed
- Range: 400 km (250 mi, 220 nmi)
- Service ceiling: 3,500 m (11,500 ft) absolute, pilot only. 2,500 m (8,200 ft)
- Time to altitude: 25 min 32 s to 1,500 m (4,900 ft)
- Take-off distance, pilot only: about 30 m (100 ft)
- Landing speed: 35 km/h (22 mph; 19 kn)
