= Antique Airplane Association =

The Antique Airplane Association, Inc. (AAA) is the oldest antique airplane association in the world. The AAA formed in August 1953 by Robert L. Taylor, via a classified ad in Flying magazine and a few people with a deep-seated interest in old airplanes, for the purpose to fly, to preserve, to share and to promote the early flying machines.

The AAA operates from Antique Airfield in Blakesburg, Iowa and serves as the headquarters for its 50 chapter organizations and 7000 members from throughout the United States and 20 foreign countries.

Late founder and president of the national Antique Airplane Association, as well as the former chairman of the board of the closely affiliated Airpower Museum Inc., Taylor states on the national club website "At that time (1953) no other association existed that had a specific interest in antique and classic airplanes. No aviation historical groups had yet been formed. The AAA was organized to "Keep the Antiques Flying" and this basic premise has always been our main interest and primary function. We do provide our membership with aviation history and memories of the important parts our own members have played in this fascinating subject."

== History ==
The AAA of the late 50s was incorporated by Ken Cook, at the time serving as the AAA vice president. During this time Cook published a new version of the AAA News and would later rename it the American Airman magazine. In 1961, Cook withdrew his involvement with the AAA. In the 1960s, the remaining parts stock for LeBlond aircraft engines were sold to the AAA. There are a few parts left, but mostly what's left are engine drawings. In 1970 the AAA Board of Directors approved the necessary changes required of the AAA in order to be chartered as a non-profit corporation in the state of Iowa and has operated as such since that time.
