= Salmson AD.3 =

AD.3
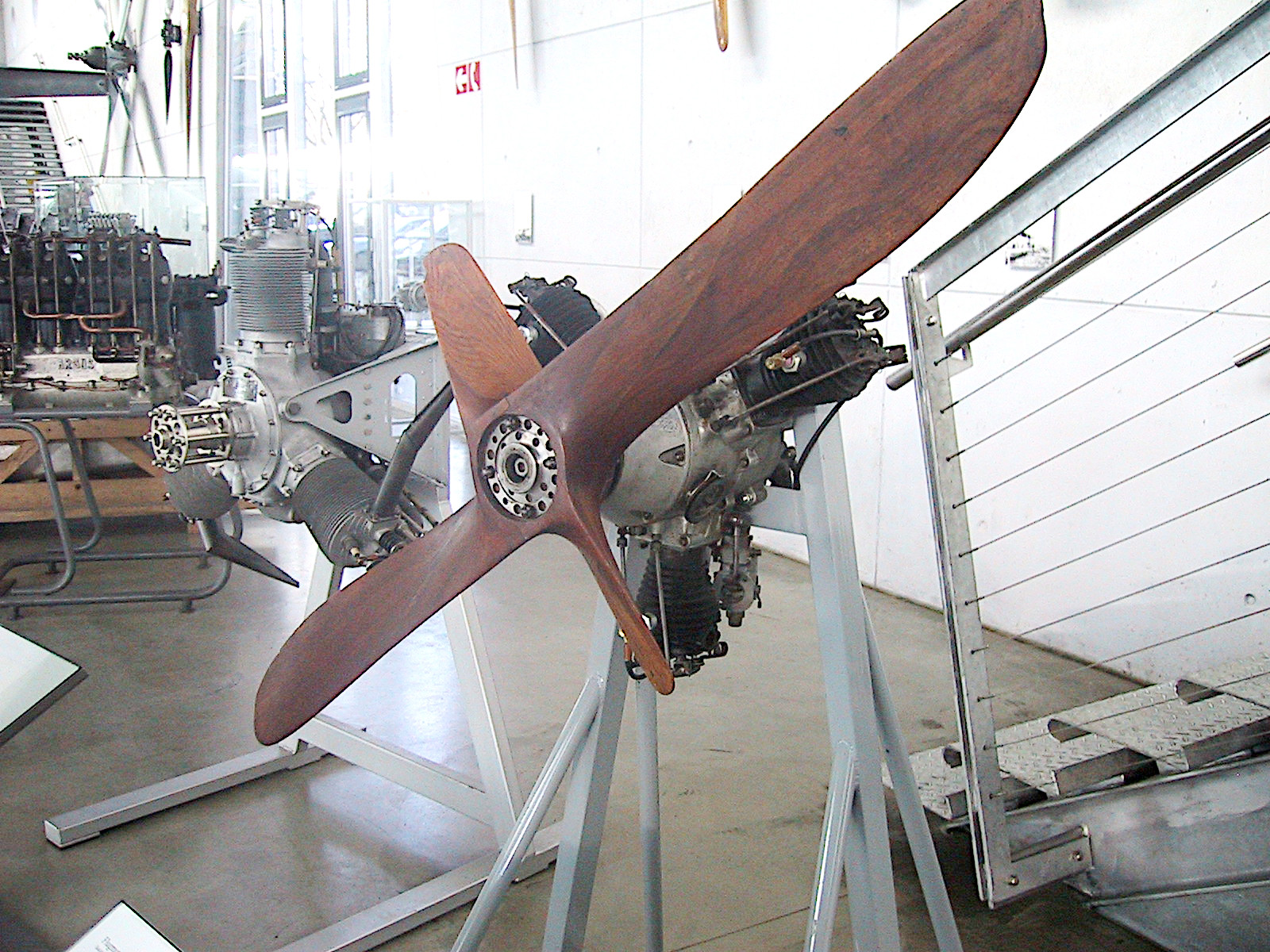
- Preserved Salmson 3 Ad engine at the Deutsches Museum Flugwerft Schleissheim
- Type: Radial engine
- National origin: France
- Manufacturer: Salmson

The Salmson AD.3 or Salmson 3 Ad was a French designed, three-cylinder, air-cooled radial aero engine. It was also produced by British Salmson in Great Britain during the 1920s.

== Applications (3 Ad) ==
- Adaridi AD 3
- Farman Aviette
- Peyret-Nessler Libellule

== Engines on display ==
A preserved Salmson 3 Ad engine is on public display at the Deutsches Museum, Munich.

== Specifications (AD.3) ==
Data from Flight, 21 February 1924.

=== General characteristics ===
- Type: Three-cylinder, single-row, water-cooled radial engine
- Bore: 70 mm (2.75 in)
- Stroke: 86 mm (3.4 in)
- Displacement: 0.993 L (60.6 cu in)
- Length: 650 mm (25.6 in)
- Diameter: 550 mm (21.6 in)
- Dry weight: 34 kg (75 lb)

=== Components ===
- Valvetrain: Two overhead valves per cylinder, pushrod operated
- Fuel system: Claudel carburettor
- Oil system: Pressure lubrication
- Cooling system: Air-cooled
- Reduction gear: Direct drive

=== Performance ===
- Power output: 12 kW (16 hp) at 2,400 rpm
- Compression ratio: 5.5.:1
- Specific fuel consumption: 250 g (0.55 lb) per horsepower-hour
- Oil consumption: 15 g (0.33 lb) per horsepower hour
- Power-to-weight ratio: 0.35 kW/kg (0.21 hp/lb)

== See also ==
Comparable engines

- Blackburne Thrush
- Bristol Lucifer
- Szekely SR-3

Related lists

- List of aircraft engines
