= Bounsall Super Prospector =

American homebuilt STOL aircraft

Super Prospector
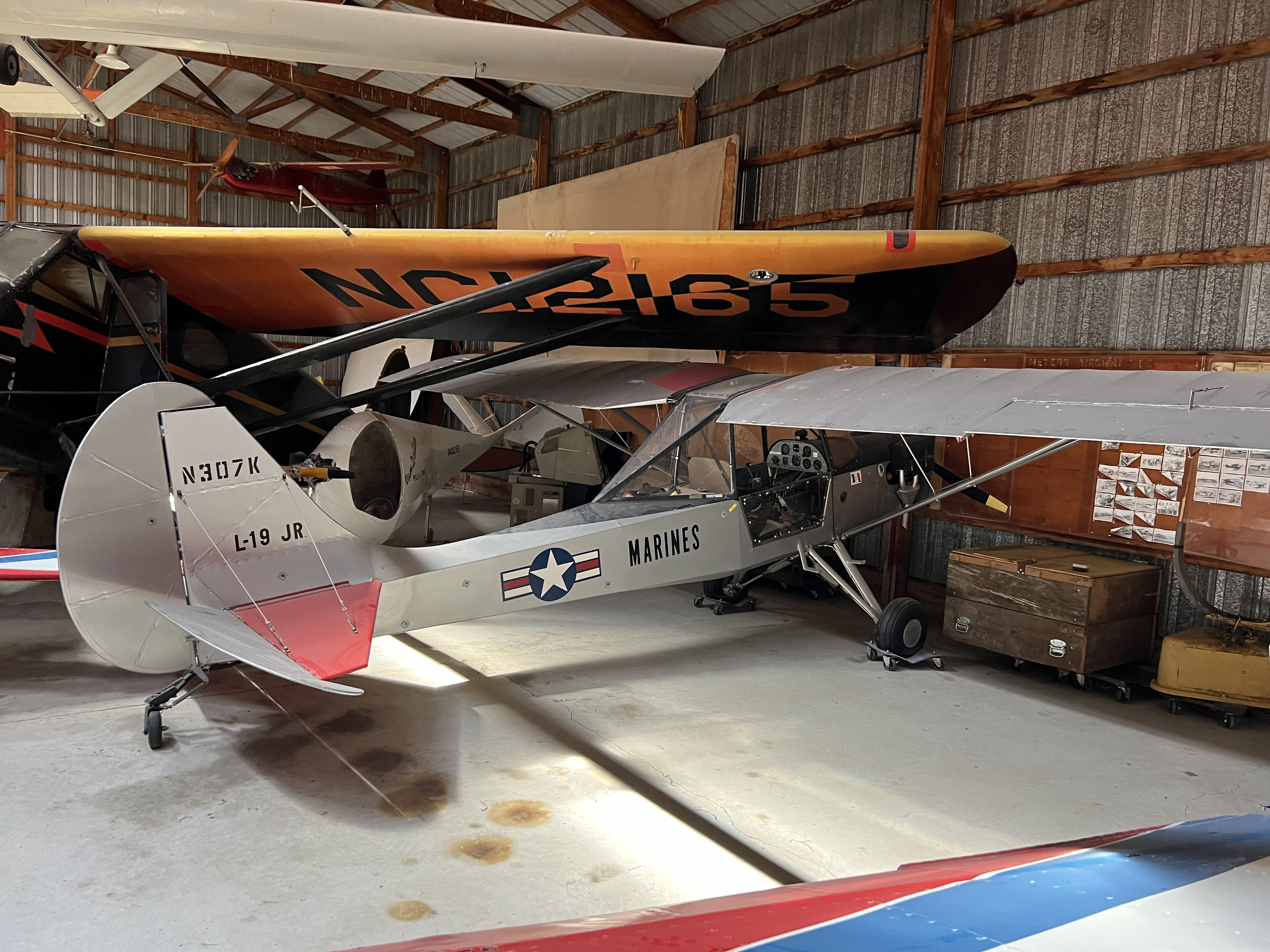
- Super Prospector marked as a Cessna L-19

General information
- Type: Homebuilt aircraft
- National origin: United States
- Manufacturer: Bounsall Aircraft
- Status: Production completed
- Number built: At least five

The Bounsall Super Prospector is an American STOL homebuilt aircraft that was designed and produced by Bounsall Aircraft of Mesquite, Nevada, introduced in 1990s. When it was available the aircraft was supplied as a kit or in the form of plans for amateur construction.

== Design and development ==
The Super Prospector has a strut-braced high-wing, a single-seat enclosed cockpit with doors, fixed conventional landing gear and a single engine in tractor configuration.

The aircraft fuselage is made from welded 4130 steel tubing and an optional pre-welded fuselage frame was available as part of the kit. The wing is predominantly of wooden construction, with all surfaces covered in doped aircraft fabric and is supported by "V" struts, with jury struts. Its 29.67 ft (9.0 m) span wing has an area of 120.8 sq ft (11.22 m^{2}). The acceptable power range is 50 to 85 hp (37 to 63 kW) and the standard powerplant used is a 60 hp (45 kW) Volkswagen air-cooled engine.

The Super Prospector has a typical empty weight of 440 lb (200 kg) and a gross weight of 800 lb (360 kg), giving a useful load of 360 lb (160 kg). With full fuel of 12 U.S. gallons (45 L; 10.0 imp gal) the payload for pilot and baggage is 288 lb (131 kg).

The aircraft has been noted for its all-around pilot visibility and its STOL performance. Standard day, sea level take off distance is 300 ft (91 m) and the landing distance is 250 ft (76 m). The manufacturer estimates the construction time from the supplied kit as 500 hours.

== Operational history ==
By 1998 the company reported that three kits had been sold.

In December 2013 one example was registered in the United States with the Federal Aviation Administration, although at one time five had been registered.

== Specifications (Super Prospector) ==
Data from AeroCrafter

General characteristics

- Crew: one
- Length: 19 ft 4 in (5.89 m)
- Wingspan: 29 ft 8 in (9.04 m)
- Wing area: 120.8 sq ft (11.22 m^{2})
- Empty weight: 440 lb (200 kg)
- Gross weight: 800 lb (363 kg)
- Fuel capacity: 12 U.S. gallons (45 L; 10.0 imp gal)
- Powerplant: 1 × Volkswagen air-cooled engine four cylinder, air-cooled, four stroke automotive conversion engine, 60 hp (45 kW)
- Propellers: 2-bladed wooden

Performance

- Maximum speed: 100 mph (160 km/h, 87 kn)
- Cruise speed: 90 mph (140 km/h, 78 kn)
- Stall speed: 36 mph (58 km/h, 31 kn)
- Range: 300 mi (480 km, 260 nmi)
- Service ceiling: 12,000 ft (3,700 m)
- Rate of climb: 600 ft/min (3.0 m/s)
- Wing loading: 6.6 lb/sq ft (32 kg/m^{2})
