= Iowa Aviation Museum =

Coordinates: 41.324371°N 94.444234°W

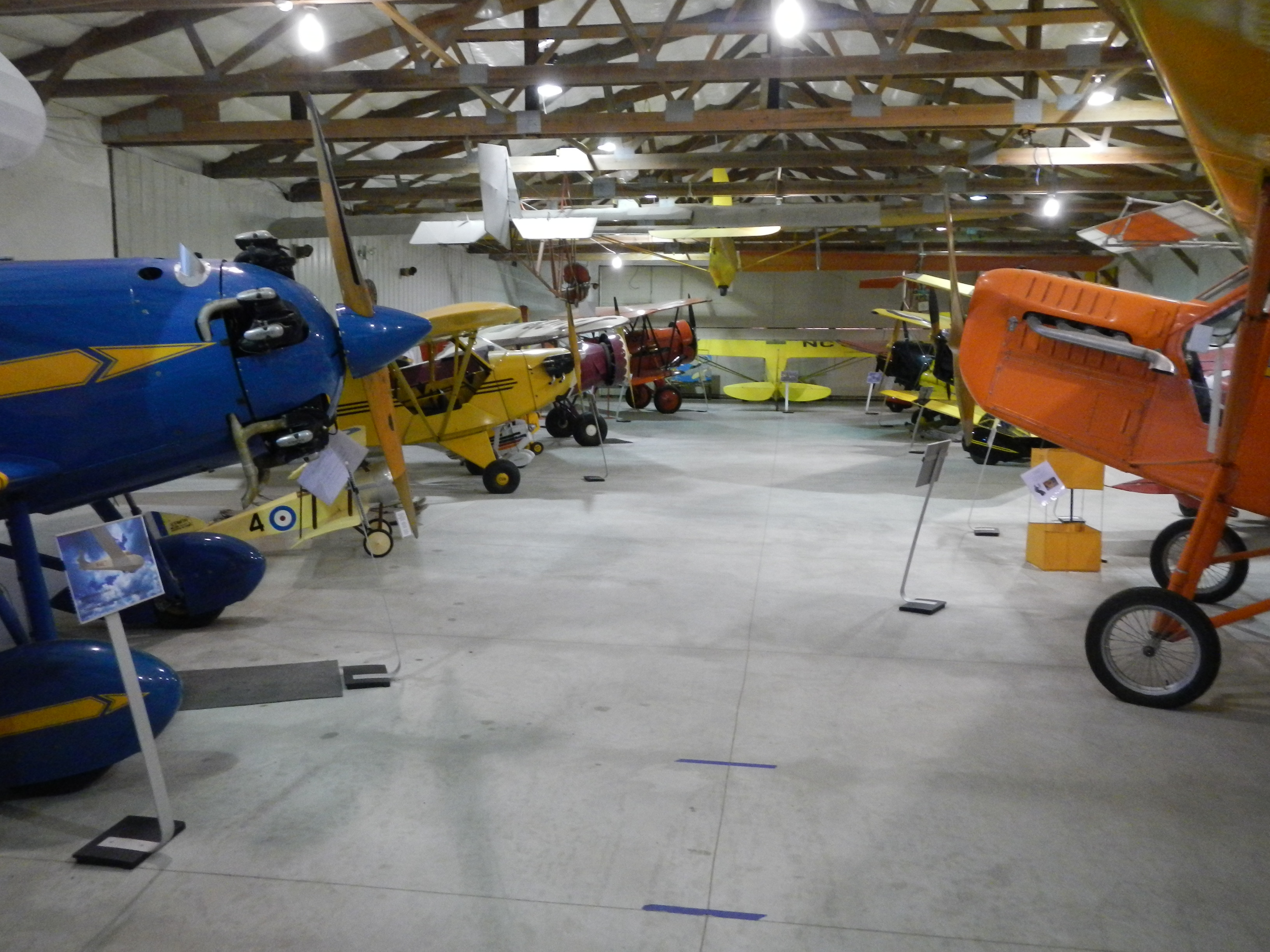
- Location: 2251 Airport Rd, Greenfield, Iowa
- Type: Aviation
- Website: http://www.flyingmuseum.com

The Iowa Aviation Museum is located at the Greenfield Municipal Airport in Greenfield, Iowa, and is dedicated to preserving Iowa's aviation heritage. The Iowa Aviation Hall of Fame, located at the museum, honors Iowans who have contributed significantly to the growth of aviation.

== Collection ==
The Iowa Aviation Museum has eleven civil aircraft on display, including some rare examples of early flying machines from the 1920s, 1930s and 1940s. The museum's collection includes:

- 1941 de Havilland Tiger Moth, Australian Model
- 1946 Piper J-3 Cub
- 1928 Curtiss Robin
- 1929 Northrop Primary Glider
- 1937 Piper J-2
- 1941 de Havilland Tiger Moth, Canadian Model
- 1941 Aetna-Timm Aero craft
- 1946 Taylorcraft, BC12
- 1957 Schweizer 1-20
- 1932 Mead Primary Glider
- 1968 Pitts Special S1S
- 1975 Easy Riser Glider
- A-7D Corsair II
- AH-1 Huey Cobra Gunship
- 1929 Pietenpol Replica
- 1931 Kari Keen
- 1929 Stearman
- 1963 Cherokee II Sailplane

== Iowa Aviation Hall of Fame ==
The Iowa Aviation Hall of Fame began in 1990 and preceded the opening of the Iowa Aviation Museum. According to the museum's website, "Nominations to the Hall of Fame are accepted until February 1st of each year. A selection committee, appointed by the Museum's Board of Directors, evaluates the nominations on a point system. A permanent tribute for each Hall of Fame inductee is featured at the Museum. The Museum is the only place in Iowa which focuses on the state's aviation heritage."

=== Iowa Aviation Hall Of Fame Inductees By Year ===
1990

- Ann Holtgren Pellegreno: First woman to serve as a Commissioner for both the Iowa Aeronautics Commission and the Iowa Department of Transportation.
- John and Yvonne Schildberg: John's fascination with vintage aircraft and Yvonne's generosity resulted in the presentation of ten antique aircraft to the Greenfield community which was the foundation of the Iowa Aviation Museum.
- John Wesley Cable: Constructed the first airport in Waterloo, Iowa in 1927.
- William "Billy" Robinson
- Wyman Fiske Marshall: A member of the “Three Musketeers,” the first aerobatic flying team in the United States, from 1928 to 1929 and United States Marine Corps Brigadier General.

1991

- Aden "Bite" Livingston
- Arthur J. Hartman
- Don Ultang
- Ila Fox Loetscher

1992

- Charles A. Horner
- Neta Snook Southern: Taught Amelia Earhart how to fly.
- Sidney "Sid" Cleveland

1993

- Clarence Duncan Chamberlin
- Clayton Folkerts
- Louis "Andy" Anderson
- Nellie Vos Ruby

1994

- Eugene Burton Ely
- JC Pemberton
- Luther H. Smith
- Robert L. Taylor

1995

- John Livingston
- Ralph E. Piper
- Robert Freyermuth

1996

- Carl G. Zeliadt
- Grant H. Woldum
- Howard V. Gregory

1997

- Charles W. Fink
- Donald A. Luscombe
- Herbert R. Elliott
- William Norman Reed

1998

- Avery "Jack" Ladd
- Elvin F. Knotts
- Robert W. Williams

1999

- Charles Gatschet
- Clifton P. "Ole" Oleson
- Harold B. Miller

2000

- Hartley A. "Hap" Westbrook

2001

- Ralph Weberg
- Robert Parmele
- Russell and Dolly Zangger

2002

- Carl Bates
- Glenn L. Martin

2003

- Louis Schalk
- Walter Cunningham
- Wilbur and Orville Wright

2004

- Ellen Church Marshall
- Joseph P. Gomer

2005

- H. Jerry Dwyer

2006

- The Iowa Tuskegee Airmen: William V. Bibb, James E. Bowman, Russell L. Collins, Maurice V. Esters, Joseph P. Gomer, Robert L. Martin, George R. Miller, Clarence A. Oliphant, Robert M. Parkey, Luther H. Smith, Thurman E. Spriggs, and Robert W. Williams.

2007

- Frank C. Wallace
- Wilmer A. Reedholm

2008

- Kimberly D. Olson
- William J. Fox

2009

- Delbert H. Clayton
- Jack E. Conger

2010

- Clyde Cable
- Glen Niederhauser

== See also ==
- North American aviation halls of fame
- List of aerospace museums
