= Aeronca E-113 =

1936 flat-twin aircraft engine

E-113/J-99
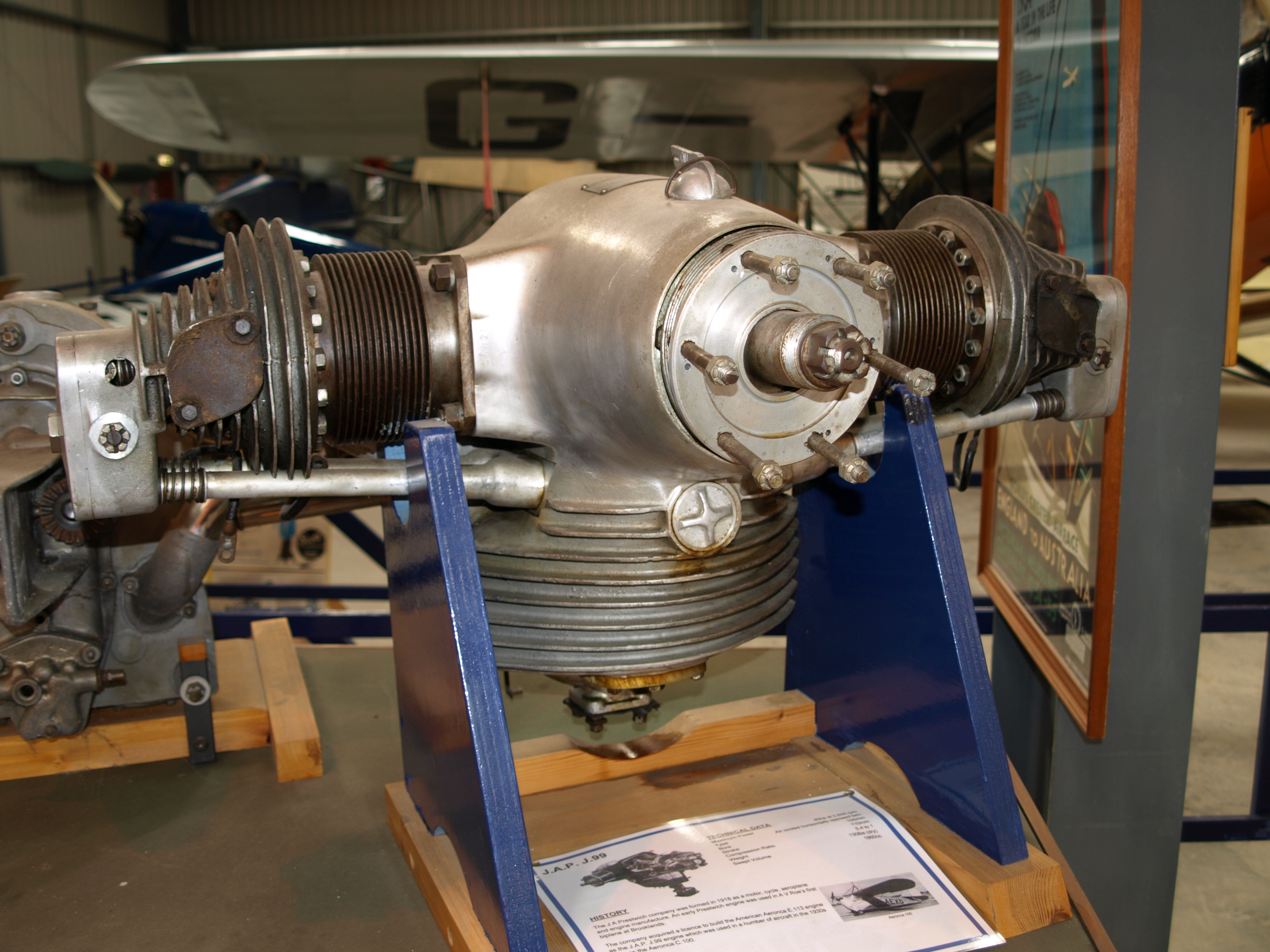
- An Aeronca-JAP J-99 (licensed E-113) on display at the Shuttleworth Collection.
- Type: Flat-twin aircraft engine
- Manufacturer: Aeronca; JA Prestwich
- First run: 1936
- Number built: 1,800
- Developed from: Aeronca E-107

The E-113 was a small flat-twin piston engine developed by Aeronca for use in some of their light aircraft. It was an overhead valve development of the flathead configuration E-107.

== Design and development ==
Originally fitted with a single ignition system, this was updated to dual ignition when changes in FAA regulations made this mandatory in 1939. By that time, however, both the engine and the aircraft that it powered were facing obsolescence. Altogether, some 1,800 examples were built.

Following an incident in October 2015, where the propeller detached from a J-99 variant Aeronca C3, the Light Aircraft Association has issued an advisory that all aircraft fitted with these engines have the crankshaft attachment inspected prior to flying again. This issue was first recognised in 1939.

== Variants ==
E-113A
Standard production model delivering 36-45 hp (26.85 - 33.56 kW)
E-113C
Uprated engine delivering 40-45 hp (29.83 - 33.56 kW)
Aeronca-JAP J-99
The E-113-C was license built in England as the Aeronca-JAP J-99 by J A Prestwich Limited (JAP) and powered several British aircraft types, differing from the E-113 by being fitted with dual ignition.
O-113
Engines fitted to impressed aircraft were given the designation O-113.

== Applications ==
=== E-113 ===
- Aeronca C-3
- Aeronca K
- Welch OW-6M

=== J-99 ===
- Aeronca 100
- Aeronca 300
- Britten-Norman BN-1
- Currie Wot
- Dart Kitten
- Hants and Sussex Aviation Herald
- Heath Parasol
- Hillson Praga
- Luton Minor
- Peterborough Ely
- Slingsby Motor Tutor
- Taylor J.T.1
- Tipsy Junior

== Engines on display ==
- An Aeronca E-113 is on public display at the Aerospace Museum of California

== Specifications (E-113) ==
=== General characteristics ===
- Type: 2-cylinder air-cooled horizontally opposed aircraft piston engine
- Bore: 4.25 in (107.95 mm)
- Stroke: 4 in (101.6 mm)
- Displacement: 113.49 in³ (1.86 L)
- Dry weight: 118 lb (54 kg)

=== Components ===
- Cooling system: Air-cooled

=== Performance ===
- Power output: 36-40 hp (26.9-29.8 kW) at 2,400-2520 rpm
- Compression ratio: 5.1:1

== See also ==
Comparable engines

- ABC Scorpion
- Armstrong Siddeley Ounce
- Praga B2
- Walter Atom
- Welch O-2

Related lists

- List of aircraft engines
