= Aeronca C-2 =

American light aircraft

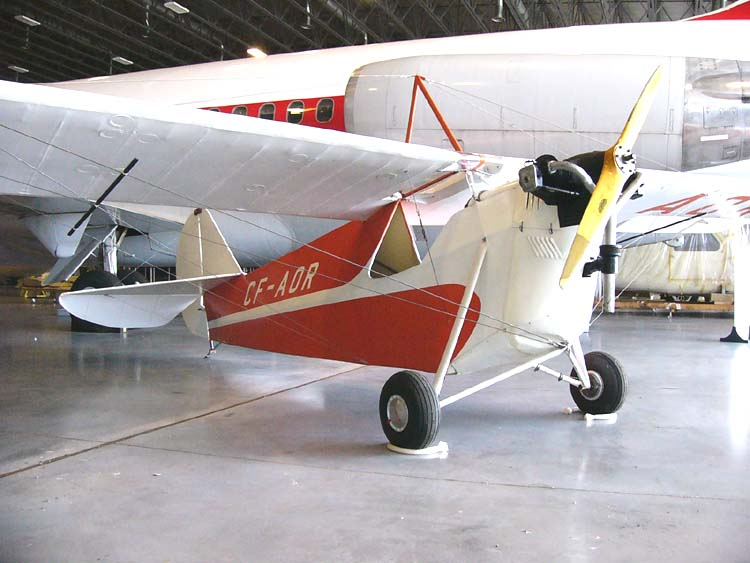
- Aeronca C-2 in the Canada Aviation and Space Museum

General information
- Type: Monoplane
- National origin: United States
- Manufacturer: Aeronca Aircraft
- Designer: Jean A. Roche
- Number built: 164

History
- First flight: 1929
- Developed from: 1925 Roche Monoplane
- Variants: C-1 Cadet; Aeronca C-3 Master

The Aeronca C-2 is an American light monoplane designed by Jean A. Roche and built by Aeronca Aircraft.

== Development ==
=== Roche Monoplane ===
Jean A. Roche was a U.S. Army engineer at McCook Field airfield in Dayton, Ohio. Roche developed an aircraft with automatic stability and was granted U. S. Patent No. 1,085,461. Roche published his engineering ideas for the aircraft in Aerial Age Weekly and Slipstream Monthly magazines. The prototype was started in Ohio in 1923 with the assistance of fellow engineer Quinten Dohse. The aircraft used a triangular cross-section welded steel tube fuselage, with wood wings, was fabric-covered, and used wire bracing throughout. A Henderson engine was installed, but did not perform well. Next a custom 29 hp two-cylinder Morehouse engine was developed for the aircraft. On September 1, 1925, the aircraft was successfully test flown. Many pilots including Jimmy Doolittle tried out the aircraft. Wright Aeronautical hired Morehouse and rights to his Wright-Morehouse WM-80 engine. Left without an engine, They turned to Robert E. Galloway of the Aeronautical Corporation of America to use the Aeronca E-107 engine. The rights to the aircraft were sold to Aeronca in 1928 as the basis for the C-2.

=== Aeronca C-2 ===
The Aeronca C-2, powered by a tiny two-cylinder engine, made its first flight in October 1929, with its public debut in St. Louis in February 1930. It was flying at its most basic—the pilot sat on a bare plywood board. The C-2 featured an unusual, almost frivolous design with an open-pod fuselage that inspired its nickname, The Flying Bathtub. (It was also nicknamed "Airknocker" and "Razorback".) The general design of the C-2 could have been inspired by Jean Roche's initial flight experiences with an American-built copy of the Santos-Dumont Demoiselle, which had a similar triangular "basic" fuselage cross-section, and wire-spoked main landing gear wheels against the fuselage sides. The C designation derived from the fact that Aeronca had earlier been formed as the Cincinnati Aeronautical Corporation,

Equipped with only four instruments (altimeter, oil temperature, oil pressure, and tachometer), a stick, and rudder pedals (brakes and a heater at extra cost), the C-2 was priced at a low $1,555 (later US$1,245), bringing the cost of flying down to a level that a private citizen could perhaps reach. Aeronca sold 164 of the economical C-2s at the height of the Great Depression in 1930-1931, helping to spark the growth of private aviation in the United States.

The Aeronca C-2 also holds the distinction of being the first aircraft to be refueled from a moving automobile. A can of gasoline was handed up from a speeding Austin automobile to a C-2 pilot, (who hooked it with a wooden cane) during a 1930 air show in California.

A single Aeronca C-2, G-ABHE, was converted to a glider by H.J. Parham in England after an in-flight engine failure and forced landing. The nose was faired in after the removal of the engine. It first flew as a glider 15 May 1937 and went to the Dorset Glider Club but was destroyed in the club hangar during a storm in November 1938.

== Variants ==
Aeronca C-2
Single-seat light sporting aircraft, powered by a 26 horsepower (19 kW) Aeronca E-113 piston engine.
Aeronca C-2 Collegian
Improved two-seat version, with a wider fuselage, a 40 horsepower (30 kW) E-113A engine, and a number of design improvements but retaining the open cockpit and strut-braced undercarriage. Confusingly, Aeronca renamed this version the C-3 Collegian.

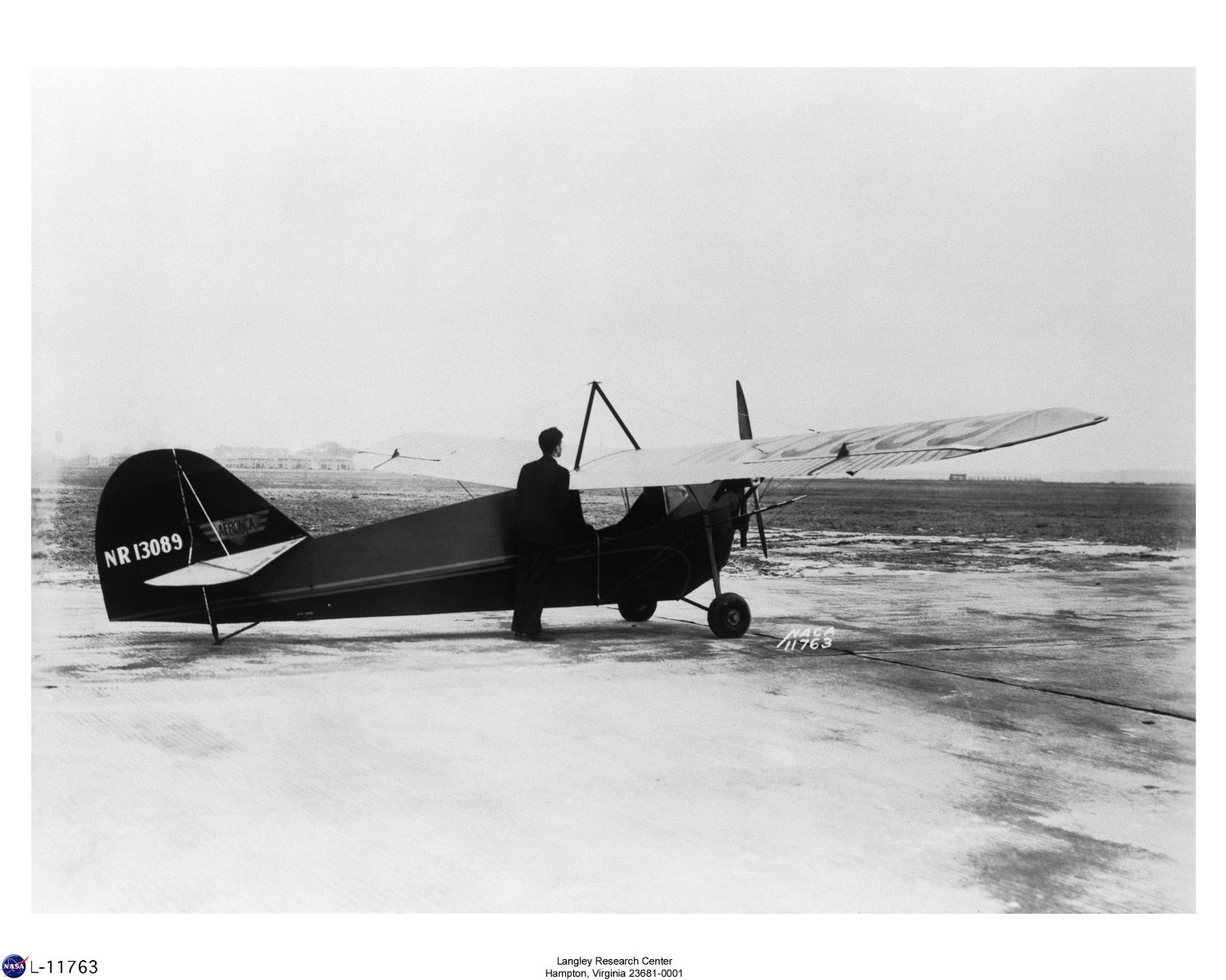
Aeronca C-2N Scout De luxe at Langley. This is now at the EAA Museum, Oshkosh.

Aeronca C-2N Scout
Deluxe sporting aircraft, powered by a 36-hp (27-kW) Aeronca E-112 or E-133A piston engine. Four built.

Note that a P prefix, as in PC-2N, would indicate that the aircraft was fitted with floats, P standing for Pontoon.

== Surviving aircraft ==
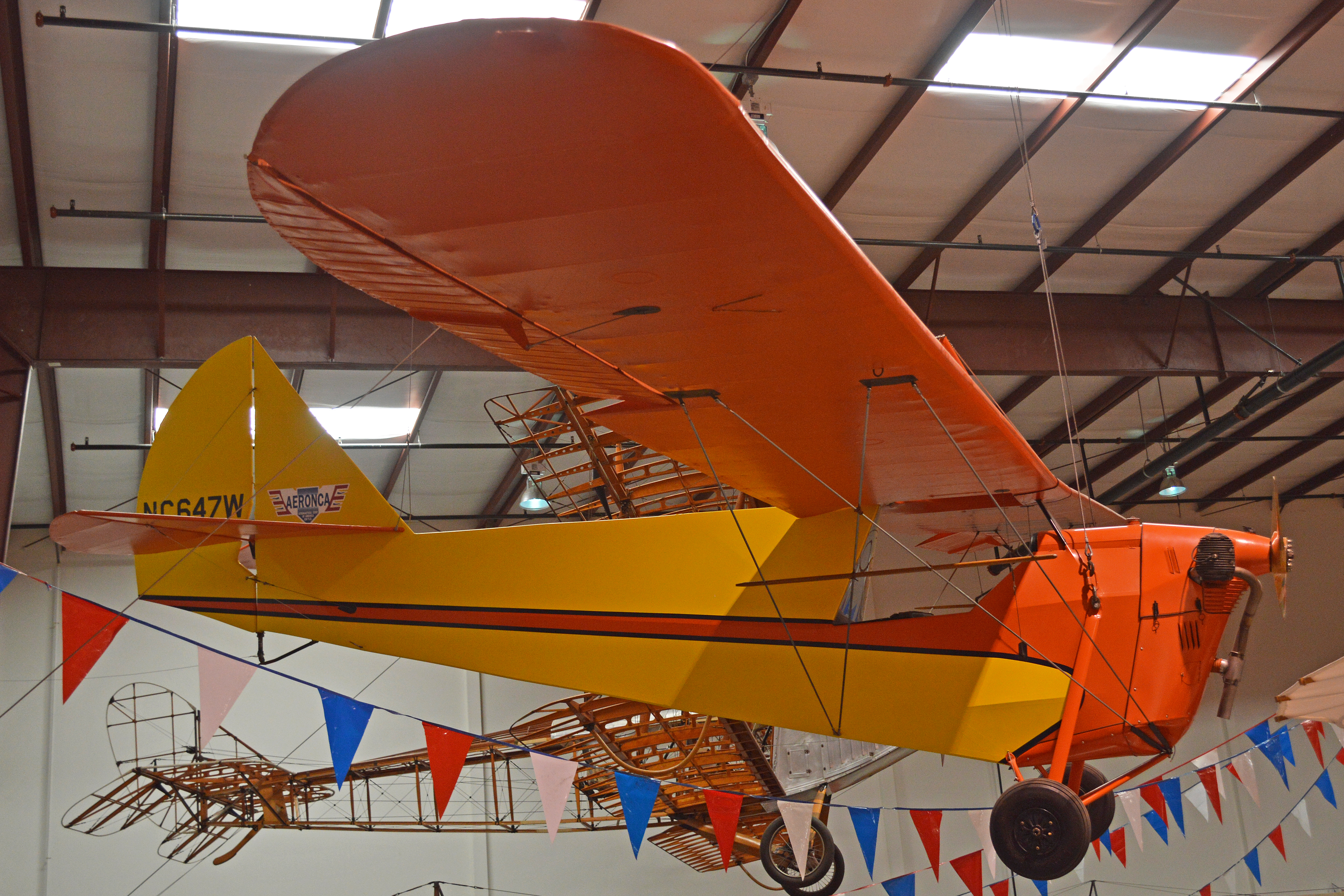
C-2 Sport at Yanks Air Museum

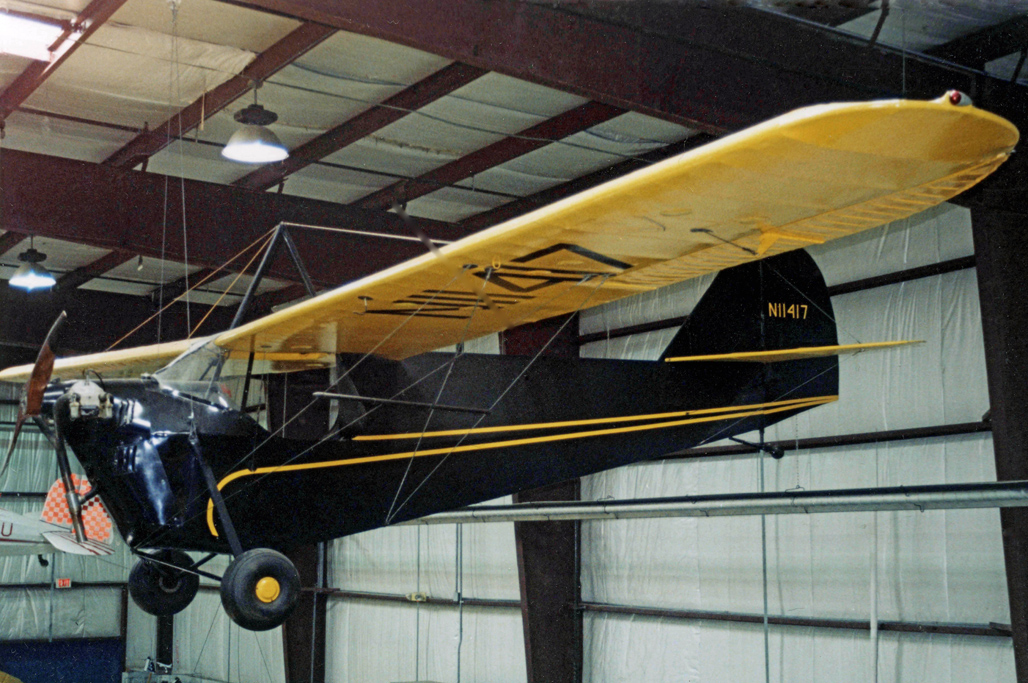
C-2N at the Virginia Aviation Museum before moving to Shannon

Canada

- A-9 – C-2 CF-AOR on static display at the Canada Aviation and Space Museum in Ottawa, Ontario.

United Kingdom

- A-100 – C-2 (modified) G-ABHE under long-term restoration in Cornwall, England as a composite, modified to comply with microlight aircraft rules.

United States

- 2 – C-2 NX626N on static display at the Udvar-Hazy Center of the National Air and Space Museum in Chantilly, Virginia. It is the first production prototype of the Aeronca C-2. It was donated to the museum in 1948 by Aeronca and was restored in 1976.
- 27 – C-2 Sport NC647W airworthy at the Yanks Air Museum in Chino, California.
- 66 – C-2 NC10304 on static display at the Ohio History Center in Columbus, Ohio.
- A-106 – C-2N NC11276 airworthy, owned by Craig MacVeigh of New Carlisle, Ohio.
- A-151 – C-2N Scout N11417 was built as an Aeronca C-1 Cadet but was soon converted to a C-2N. It is on display at the Shannon Air Museum in Fredericksburg, Virginia.
- A-253 – C-2N Scout N13089 on static display at the EAA AirVenture Museum in Oshkosh, Wisconsin. This aircraft set seven records, five of which were for seaplanes.
- 301-23 – C-2 N30RC on static display at the Museum of Flight in Seattle, Washington.

== Specifications (C-2) ==
Data from Aeronca C-2: The Story of the Flying Bathtub

General characteristics

- Crew: one
- Length: 20 ft 0 in (6.10 m)
- Wingspan: 36 ft 0 in (10.98 m)
- Height: 7 ft 6 in (2.28 m)
- Wing area: 142.2 sq ft (13.2 m^{2})
- Empty weight: 406 lb (184 kg)
- Powerplant: 1 × Aeronca E-107 1.75L flathead piston engine, 26–30 hp (19–22 kW)

Performance

- Maximum speed: 80 mph (128 km/h, 70 kn)
- Cruise speed: 65 mph (104 km/h, 56 kn)
- Stall speed: 31 mph (50 km/h, 27 kn)
- Range: 240 mi (384 km, 210 nmi)
- Service ceiling: 16,500 ft (5,032 m)
- Wing loading: 4.92 lb/sq ft (24 kg/m^{2})

== See also ==
Related development

- Aeronca C-1 Cadet
- Aeronca C-3

Aircraft of comparable role, configuration, and era

- American Eagle Eaglet
- Curtiss-Wright Junior
- Mignet Pou-du-Ciel
- Rearwin Junior
- Spartan C2
