= Welch OW-5M =

General information
- Type: Two-seat cabin monoplane
- National origin: United States
- Manufacturer: Orin Welch Aircraft Company
- Designer: Orin Moore Welch

History
- First flight: April 1931
- Developed from: ACE Aircraft Falcon

The Welch OW-5M (along with the OW-6M, OW-7M and OW-8M) were a family of American two-seat light cabin monoplanes designed by Orin Welch based on his first cabin monoplane design, the ACA Falcon. Welch's goal was to design cheap and functional light aircraft. The aircraft is a strut-braced high-wing monoplane with an enclosed cabin with side-by-side seats for two. It is similar in appearance to the Aeronca C-3, save for the wing struts. It had a steerable tailwheel landing gear and a nose-mounted engine. The fuselage was constructed with fabric covered welded steel tubing with a triangular cross section. The controls were mounted overhead with an adjustable control wheel that could be positioned for either pilot. Welch developed their own low-pressure wheels and tires for suspension.

Welch aircraft were first built by Welch Aircraft Industries, then production moved to Wilkes Barre, Pennsylvania in 1940, with the first aircraft christened "The Wyoming Valley". Total production of all types was 55 aircraft, 35 of which were Continental powered OW-5M models.

== Variants ==
OW-5M
Powered by a 40hp (30kW) Continental A-40-4 engine. Type Certificate held by the Hartmann Aircraft Corporation and sometimes described as the Hartmann OW-5M. 38 aircraft
OW-6M
Powered by a 37hp (28kW) Aeronca E-113-B engine. Type Certificate held by Stewart Aircraft Industries and sometimes described as the Stewart OW-6M. 7 aircraft
OW-6S
OW-6 with 45hp Szekely SR-30 and experimental, two-speed gear-reduction system regn. no NX14521, c/n 110.
OW-7M
Powered by a 45hp (36kW) Welch O-2 engine. 8 aircraft
OW-8M
Powered by a Franklin 4-AC-150 engine. 2 aircraft
OW-9M
Proposed variant with a Lycoming O-145, not built.
Welch ACE Falcon
A prototype fitted with an 60hp Anzani radial engine

== Survivors ==
- An OW-8M built from an uncompleted factory OW-5M is on display at the Airpower Museum, Iowa, United States.
- A scale model of the OW is displayed in the atrium lobby of the South Bend Regional Airport (KSBN).

== Specifications (OW-5M) ==
Data from skyways

General characteristics

- Crew: 1 (pilot)
- Capacity: 1 (passenger)
- Wingspan: 34 ft 5 in (10.49 m)
- Empty weight: 515 lb (234 kg)
- Gross weight: 954 lb (433 kg)
- Powerplant: 1 × Continental A-40-4 flat-four piston , 40 hp (40 kW)

Performance

- Maximum speed: 90 mph (145 km/h, 78 kn)
- Range: 275 mi (443 km, 239 nmi)
- Service ceiling: 15,000 ft (4,600 m)

== See also ==
Aircraft of comparable role, configuration, and era

- Aeronca C-3
