= Rose Parrakeet =

American homebuilt airplane

Parrakeet
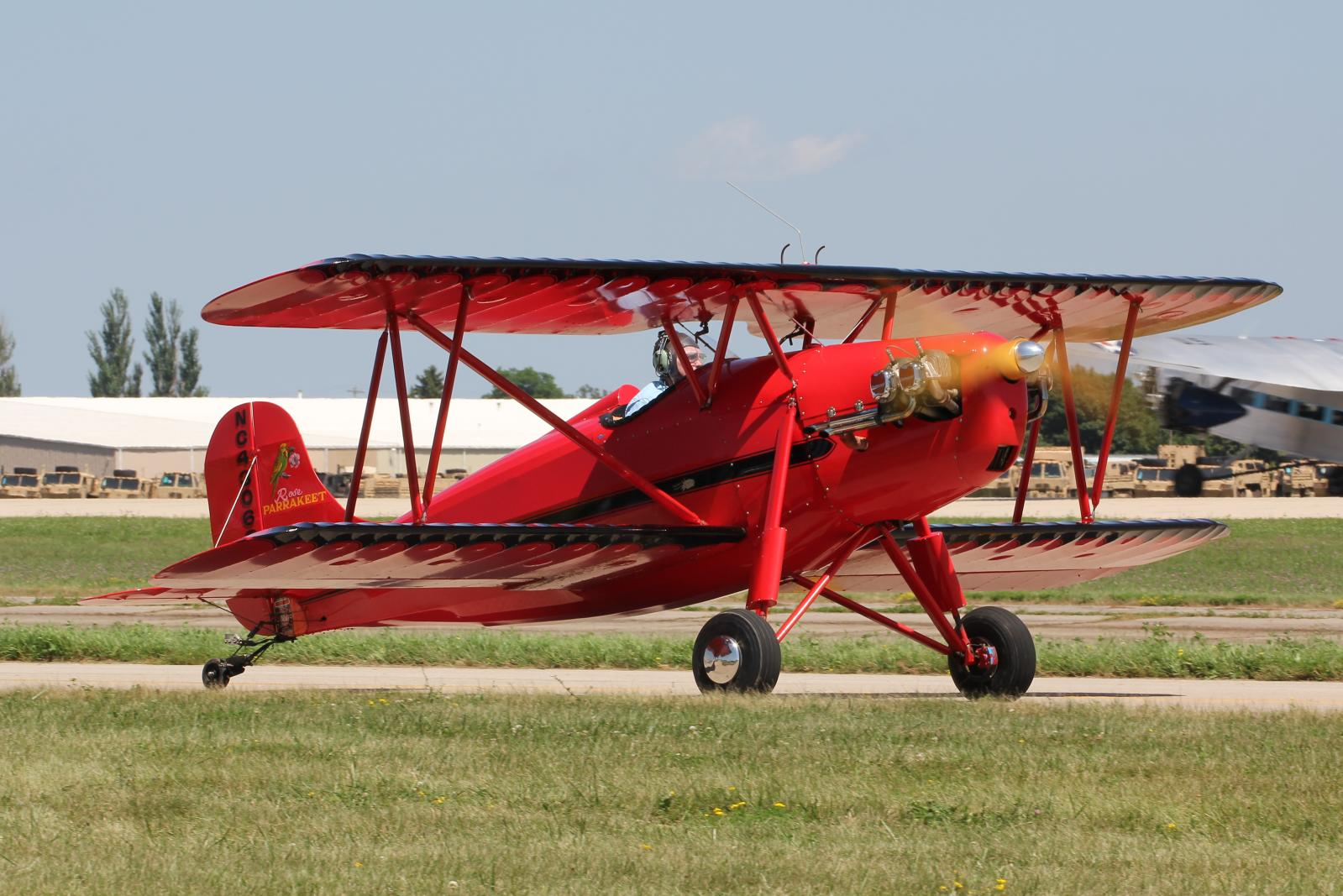
- Larry Steenstry's Rose Parrakeet. EAA AirVenture 2011

General information
- Type: Sports plane
- National origin: United States of America
- Manufacturer: Rose Aeroplane and Motor Company
- Number built: 8, plus many in kit form

History
- First flight: 1931

The Rose Parrakeet was a single-seat sporting biplane produced in small numbers in the United States during the 1930s. It was a conventional design with staggered single-bay wings of equal span braced by N-struts. The cockpit was open, and the fixed tailskid undercarriage had divided main units. An unusual feature was the use of a single strut in place of the usual flying wires.

== Development ==
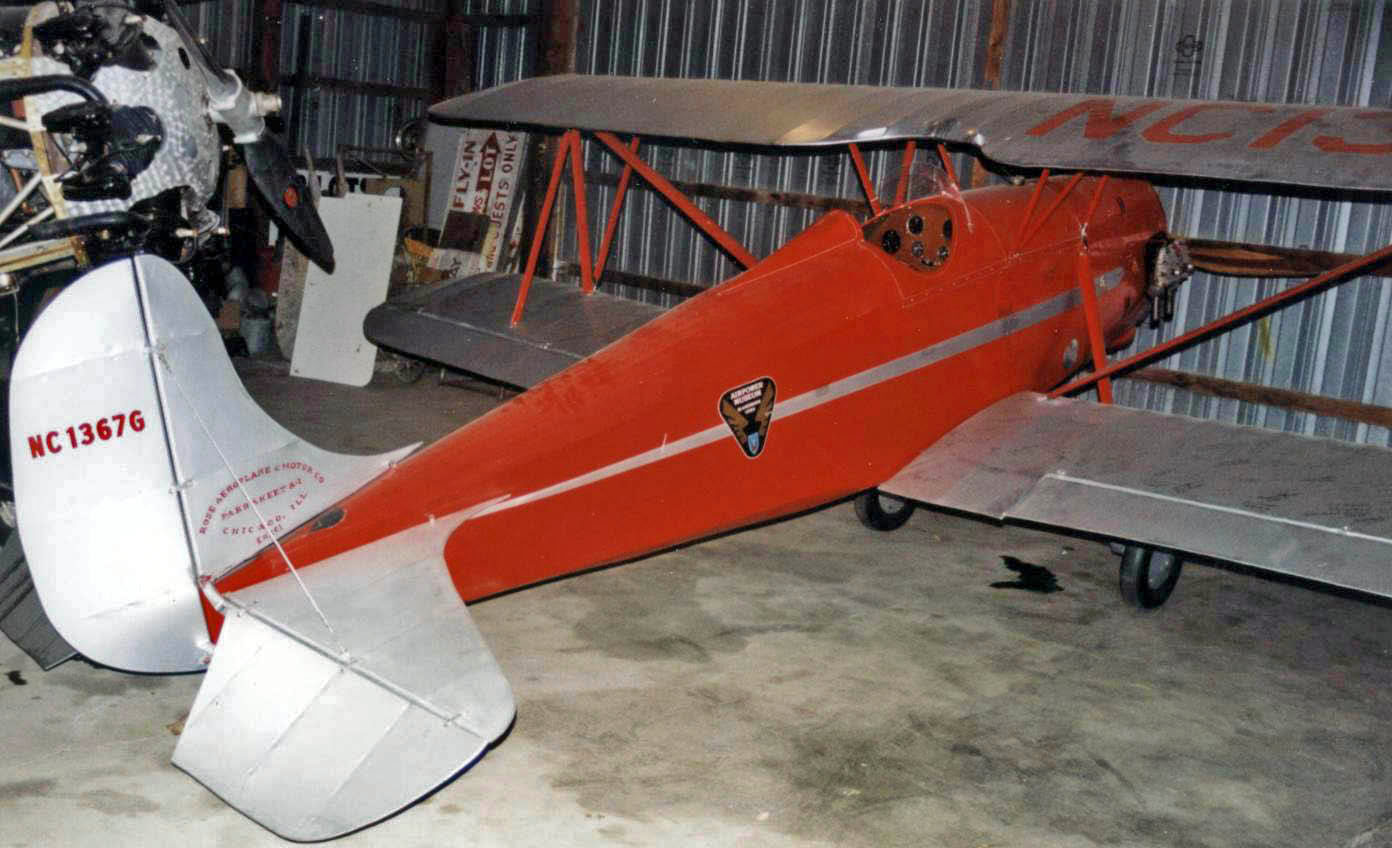
1936-built Rose Parrakeet A-1 preserved at the Air Power Museum near Ottumwa, Iowa

Only eight Parrakeets were built by Rose, but the design proved a popular one with homebuilders in the 1950s. Rights to produce kits of the Parrakeet were purchased by Hannaford Aircraft in 1948, and the design was marketed as the Hannaford Bee with structural modifications to strengthen weak points. Kits were marketed right up to the point of Hannaford founder Foster Hannaford's death in 1971, and plans continued to be sold into the 1980s. In 1968, Doug Rhinehart obtained a licence from Jack Rose to produce five all-new Parrakeets.

== Variants ==
Rose A-1 Parrakeet
various engines fitted to the prototype, including a 40hp Continental A-40, a Henderson, and a 50hp Menasco. Eight built of -1,-2 and -3 versions
Rose A-2F Parrakeet
50hp Franklin.
Rose A-2P Parrakeet
50hp Poyer.
Rose A-3F Parrakeet
60hp Franklin.
Rose A-4 Parrakeet
Four built with Continental A-65 or Continental C-85 engines.
Rhinehart-Rose A-4C Parrakeet
Revived in the 1970s fitted with a Continental O-200, five built.

== Specifications (Rose A-1 Parrakeet) ==
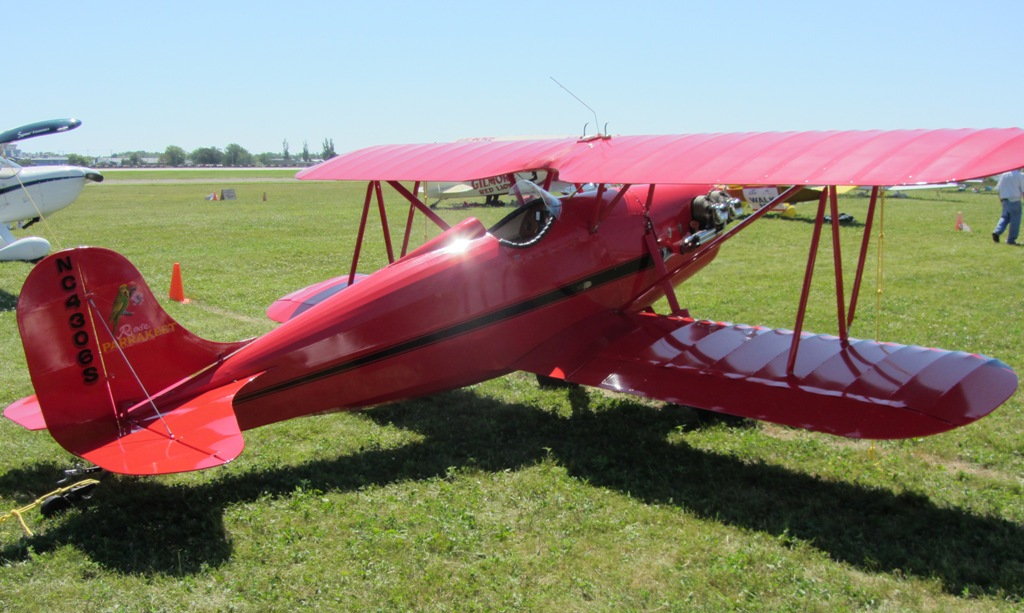
Larry Steenstry's 1997 Grand National Champion Biplane Rose Parrakeet in 2011

Data from Specifications of American Airplanes

General characteristics

- Crew: 1
- Length: 16 ft 4 in (4.98 m)
- Wingspan: 20 ft 0 in (6.10 m)
- Height: 5 ft 8 in (1.73 m)
- Wing area: 116.0 sq ft (10.78 m^{2})
- Empty weight: 456 lb (207 kg)
- Gross weight: 728 lb (330 kg)
- Fuel capacity: 10 US gal (8.3 imp gal; 38 L)
- Powerplant: 1 × Continental A-40 air-cooled flat-four engine, 37 hp (28 kW)

Performance

- Maximum speed: 100 mph (160 km/h, 87 kn)
- Cruise speed: 85 mph (137 km/h, 74 kn)
- Stall speed: 27 mph (43 km/h, 23 kn)
- Range: 340 mi (550 km, 300 nmi)
- Service ceiling: 12,000 ft (3,700 m)
- Rate of climb: 750 ft/min (3.8 m/s)
