= Aeronca C-3 =

1930s American light aircraft

C-3
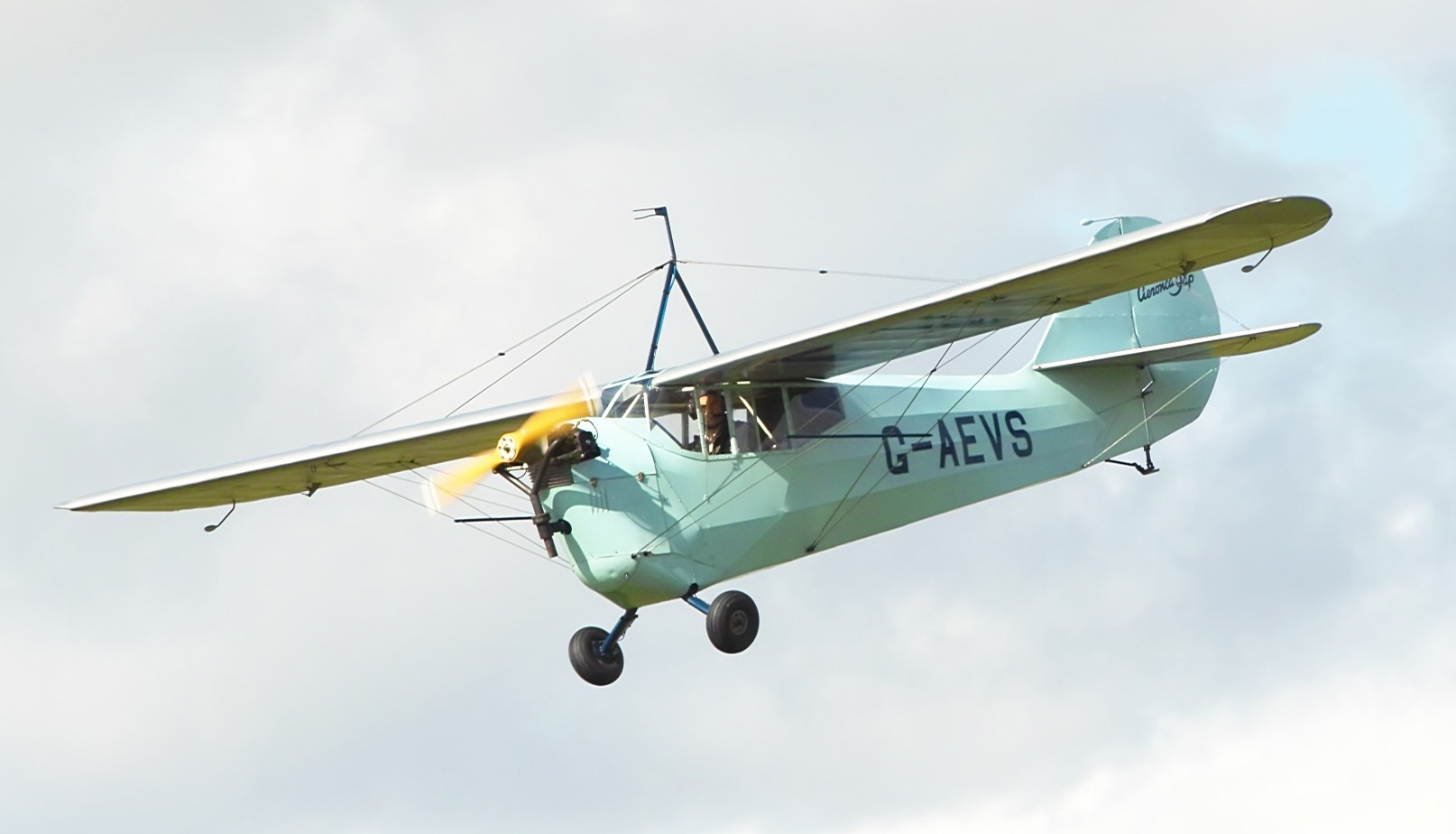
- Aeronca 100 at Sywell Airshow 2008

General information
- Type: Ultra-light monoplane
- National origin: United States
- Manufacturer: Aeronca
- Number built: 400

History
- Developed from: Aeronca C-2

The Aeronca C-3 was a light plane built by the Aeronautical Corporation of America in the United States during the 1930s.

== Design and development ==
Its design was derived from the Aeronca C-2. Introduced in 1931, it featured room for a passenger seated next to the pilot. Powered by a new 36 hp (27 kW) Aeronca E-113 engine, the seating configuration made flight training much easier and many Aeronca owners often took to the skies with only five hours of instruction, largely because of the C-3's predictable flying characteristics. Both the C-2 and C-3 are often described as “powered gliders” because of their gliding ability and gentle landing speeds.

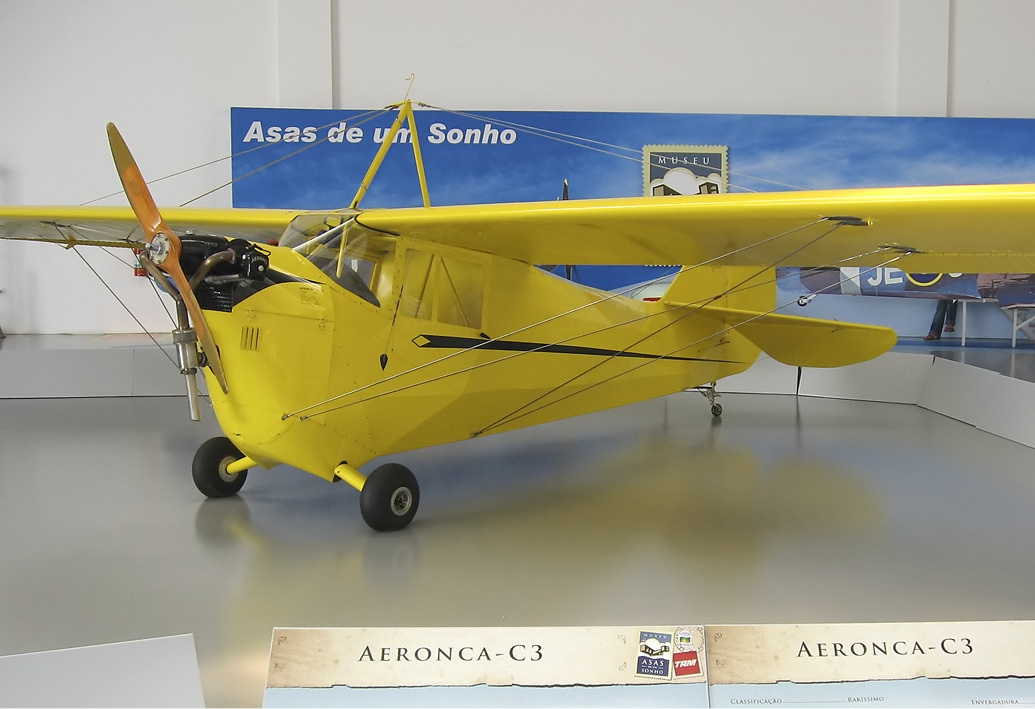
C-3 Master NC14630 at Museu Asas de Um Sonho, now TAM Museum, Brazil

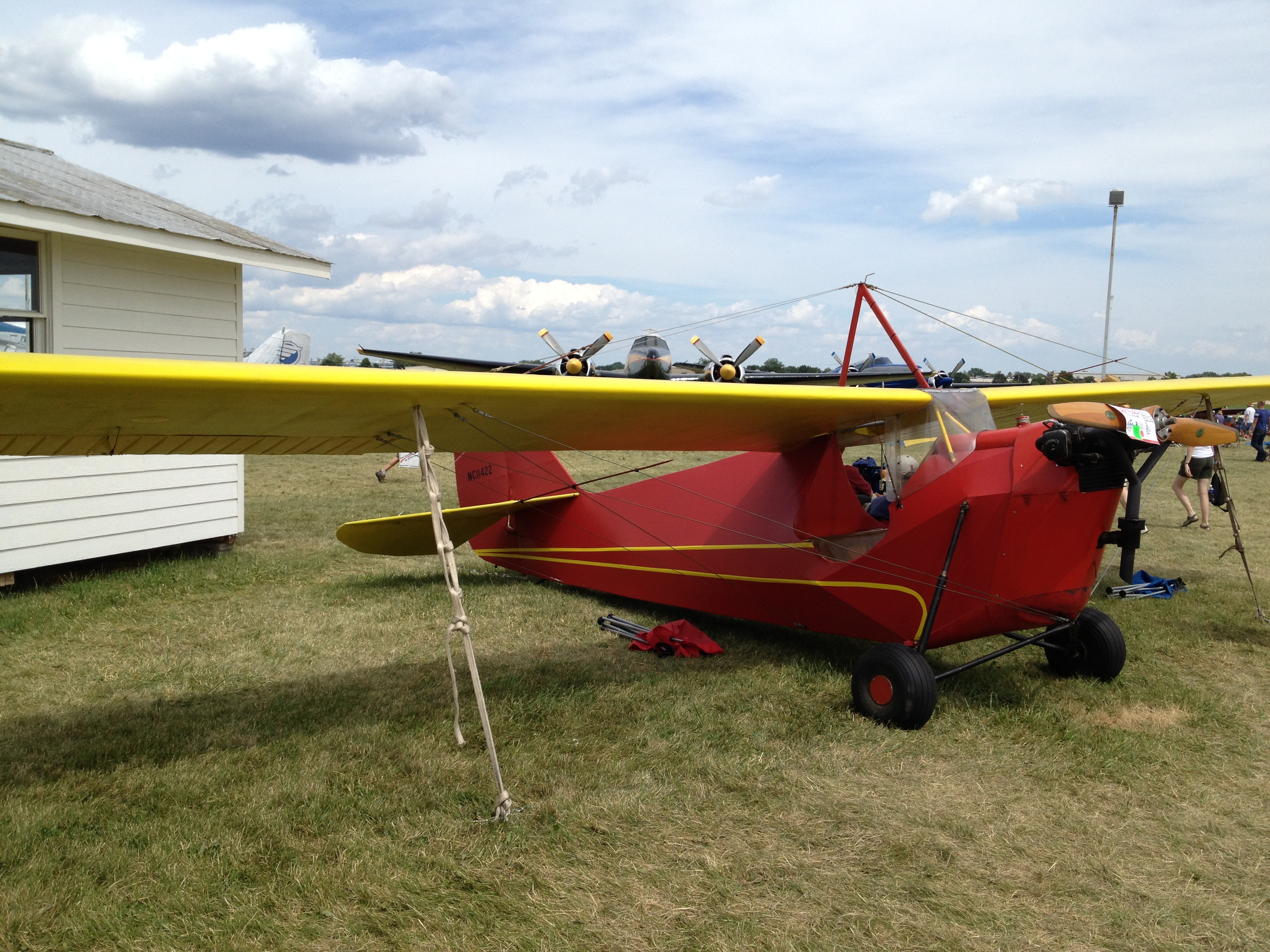
1931 Aeronca C-3 N11422 at Airventure 2013, Oshkosh, WI

The C-3's distinctive razorback design was drastically altered in 1935 with the appearance of the “roundback” C-3 Master. Retaining the tubular fuselage frame construction, the C-3 Master featured a smaller vertical stabilizer and rudder with a “filled out” fuselage shape that created the new “roundback” appearance and improved the airflow over the tail. It featured an enclosed cabin with a proper door (brakes and wing light still cost extra), and a revised undercarriage dispensing with external struts in favour of a neater arrangement largely hidden in the fuselage. The 1935 C-3 Master was priced at only $1,895—just a few hundred dollars more than the primitive C-2 of 1930. The low price generated significant sales; 128 C-3 Masters were built in 1935 alone (of 430 C-3s built in all), and the 500th Aeronca aircraft also rolled off the assembly line that same year.

A strengthened version of the C-3 with fabric-covered ailerons (instead of metal), designated the Aeronca 100, was built in England under license by Light Aircraft Ltd. (operating as Aeronautical Corporation of Great Britain Ltd. sometimes called Aeronco), and marketed by its associated company Aircraft Exchange & Mart. It was powered by a modified Aeronca E-113C engine built by J. A. Prestwich and Company and called the JAP J-99, and this led to the aircraft being marketed as the Aeronca-JAP. The expected sales never materialized – only 24 British-built aircraft were manufactured before production was halted.

The aircraft could be fitted with floats, and those so equipped were sometimes designated PC-3, with the P standing for Pontoon.

Production of the C-3 was halted in 1937 when the aircraft no longer met new U.S. government standards for airworthiness. Many of the C-3's peculiarities – a strictly external wire-braced wing with no wing struts directly connecting the wing panels with the fuselage, extensive fabric construction, single-ignition engine, and lack of an airspeed indicator – were no longer permitted. Fortunately for the legion of Aeronca owners, a “grandfather” clause in the federal regulations allowed their airplanes to continue flying, although they could no longer be manufactured.

== Variants ==
C-3
Production variant, early versions of which were built as the C-2 Collegian.
C-3 Master
Improved variant.
Aeronca 100
British-built variant powered by an Aeronca JAP J-99 (a licence built Aeronca E-113C), 21 built.
Aeronca 300
Improved British variant of the Aeronca 100, one built.
Ely 700
British variant with wider fuselage and two doors, two built.

== Surviving aircraft ==
- A-125 – C-3 N11293 on display at the Western North Carolina Air Museum in Hendersonville, North Carolina.
- A-156 – C-3 N11422 airworthy with Newhouse Flying Service, Fredericksburg, Texas.
- A-164 – C-3 N11494 on display at the Wings of History Museum in San Martin, California.
- A-173 – C-3 Collegian N12407 airworthy with Jim Hammond of Yellow Springs, Ohio. First owned for 34 years by Jean Roche, the originator of the C-2, who used it for several radical experiments.
- A-189 – C-3 N12423 airworthy at the Western Antique Aeroplane & Automobile Museum in Hood River, Oregon. It is a floatplane and was built in 1931.
- A-194 – C-3 CF-AQP at the Reynolds-Alberta Museum in Wetaskiwin, Alberta. It was built in 1931.
- A-210 – C-3 N12496 deregistered as of August 2023, previously with Jimmy Leeward at Leeward Air Ranch, Ocala, Florida. Built in 1932.
- A-215 – C-3 N13000 airworthy at the Western Antique Aeroplane & Automobile Museum in Hood River, Oregon. It was built in 1932.
- A-236 – C-3 Master N13021 airworthy with Jim Hammond of Yellow Springs, Ohio. Fitted with a 65 hp (48 kW) Continental A40 engine
- A-246 – PC-3 N13082 airworthy at the Eagles Mere Air Museum in Eagles Mere, Pennsylvania.
- A-258 – C-3 N13094 on static display at the San Diego Air & Space Museum in San Diego, California.
- A-288 – C-3 N13554 is registered to a private owner in Montana.
- A-290 – C-3 N13556 registered to a private owner in Illinois.
- A-291 – C-3 N13557 on static display at the Florida Air Museum in Lakeland, Florida.
- A-403 – C-3 Collegian N14096 airworthy with a private owner in Wilson, Louisiana.
- A-516 – C-3 Master N14630 on static display at the Museu Aeroespacial Paulista (MAPA) in São Paulo, Brazil. This aircraft was previously displayed at the Museu Asas de um Sonho.
- A-571 – C-3 Master G-CDUW registered to a private owner in Bridge of Weir, Renfrewshire, Scotland.
- A-600 – C-3 Master G-ADYS airworthy with Paul A. Gliddon in Goathland, North Yorkshire.
- A-603 – C-3 Master ZU-FRL airworthy with John Illsley in its original livery as G-AEAC. It was flown to South Africa from England in 1936.
- A-610 – C-3 Master G-AEFT airworthy with Nicholas Chittenden in Lostwithiel, Cornwall, UK. This aircraft featured in the 1986 BBC TV film "Flying For Fun", an adaptation of the eponymous 1936 book by Major HJ Parham.
- A-614 – C-3 Master floatplane NC15287 on display, wrongly marked 'NC12587', at the Yanks Air Museum in Chino, California.
- A-638 – C-3 G-AESB registered to a private owner in Lymington, Hampshire, UK
- A-668 – C-3 NC16291 airworthy at the EAA AirVenture Museum in Oshkosh, Wisconsin.
- A-673 – C-3B N16529 airworthy at the Port Townsend Aero Museum in Port Townsend, Washington. It was built in 1936.
- A-695 – C-3 N16553 displayed in the terminal building at Lunken Airport in Cincinnati, Ohio.
- A-706 – C-3 N16570 being restored for flight at Old Kingsbury Aerodrome / Pioneer Flight Museum, Kingsbury, Texas.
- A-717 – C-3 N17404 airworthy at the Golden Age Air Museum in Bethel, Pennsylvania.
- A-730 – C-3 N17419 airworthy at the Frasca Air Museum in Urbana, Illinois.
- A-734 – C-3 G-ADRR airworthy at Breighton Aerodrome, Yorkshire UK.
- A-754 – C-3 N17447 airworthy at Cole Palen's Old Rhinebeck Aerodrome in Red Hook, New York.
- AB105 – Aeronca 100 ZK-AMW airworthy with the Wingnut Syndicate in Warkworth, Auckland.
- AB110 – Aeronca 100 G-AETG under restoration in Somerset, UK.
- AB114 – Aeronca 100 G-AEVS airworthy at Breighton Aerodrome, Yorkshire, UK.
- 526 – C-3 N14640 in storage at the Shannon Air Museum in Fredericksburg, Virginia.
- 623 – C-3 N15295 airworthy at the Golden Wings Flying Museum in Blaine, Minnesota.
- Unknown ID – C-3 described as a "basket case" at the Aeronca Museum in Brighton, Michigan.

== Specifications (C-3) ==
Data from

General characteristics

- Crew: 1
- Capacity: 1 Passenger
- Length: 20 ft 0 in (6.1 m)
- Wingspan: 36 ft 0 in (10.98 m)
- Height: 7 ft 10 in (2.39 m)
- Wing area: 142.2 sq ft (13.2 m^{2})
- Empty weight: 569 lb (258 kg)
- Gross weight: 1,005 lb (456 kg)
- Powerplant: 1 × Aeronca E-113C horizontally opposed 2 cylinder piston engine , 36 hp (27 kW)

Performance

- Maximum speed: 95 mph (152 km/h, 83 kn)
- Range: 200 mi (322 km, 170 nmi)
- Service ceiling: 12,000 ft (3,659 m)

== See also ==
Aircraft of comparable role, configuration, and era

- Welch OW-5M
- Stewart Headwind
- Ultravia Le Pelican

== Bibliography ==
- Jackson, A.J. (1973). British Civil Aircraft since 1919 Volume 1. London: Putnam. ISBN 0-370-10006-9.
- Ord-Hume, Arthur W. J. G. (2000). British Light Aeroplanes. Peterborough, UK: GMS Enterprises. ISBN 1-870384-76-8.
