= Continental A40 =

A40
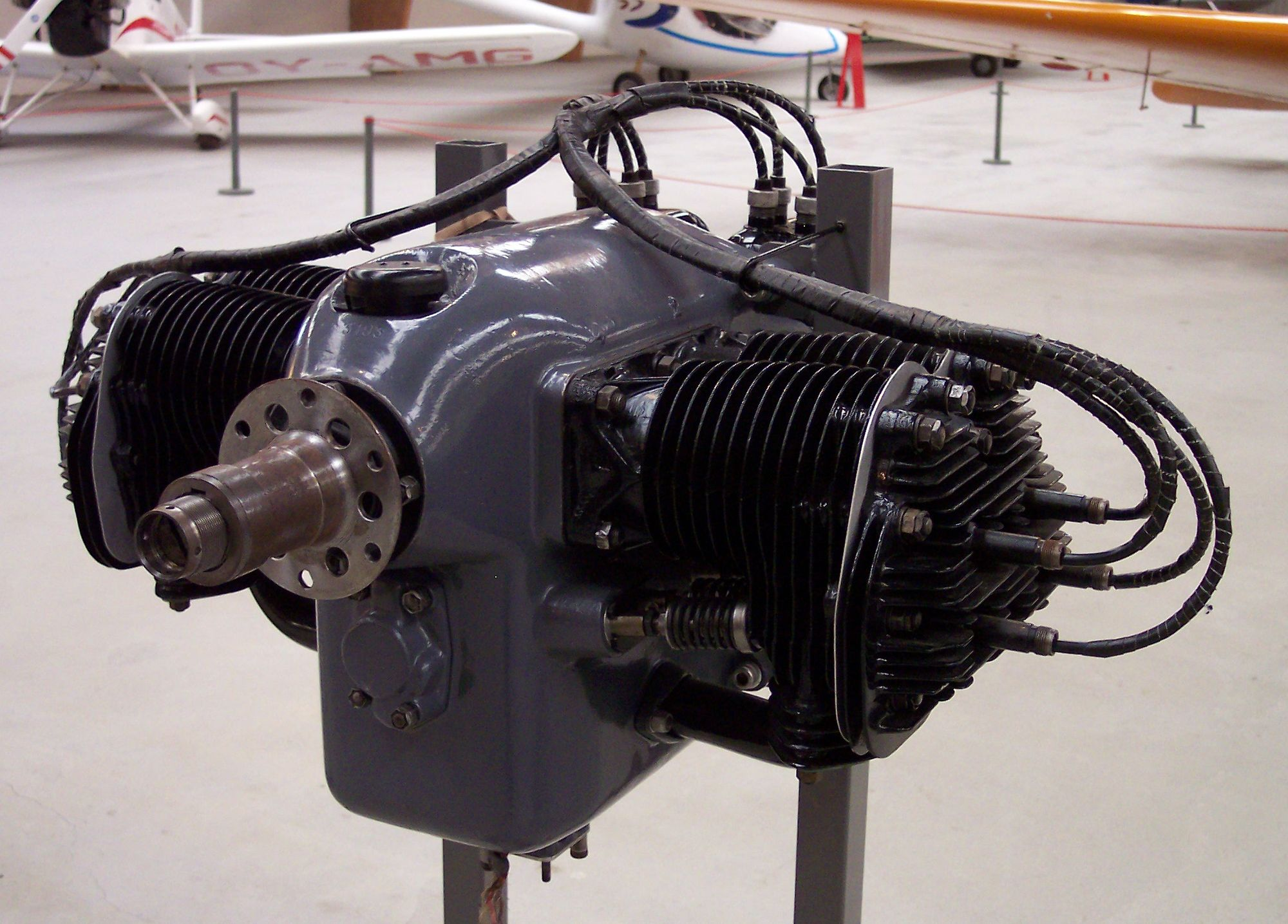
- Preserved Continental A40-5 (dual magneto, two spark plugs per cylinder)
- Type: Piston aero-engine
- National origin: United States
- Manufacturer: Teledyne Continental Motors
- First run: 1931
- Major applications: Taylor E-2 Cub; Piper J-2 Cub

The Continental A40 engine is a carbureted four-cylinder, horizontally opposed, air-cooled aircraft engine that was developed especially for use in light aircraft by Continental Motors. It was produced between 1931 and 1941.

== Design and development ==
The 37 hp (28 kW) A40 was introduced in the depths of the Great Depression. At the time there were a number of small engines available but all suffered from either high cost, complexity, or low reliability. The A-40 addressed all those shortcomings and was instrumental in the production of light aircraft in the difficult economic constraints of the period. The A-40-4 introduced an increase in power to 40 hp (30 kW). The engine later inspired the A-50 and subsequent engines.

The A40 featured single ignition until the A-40-5 version, which introduced dual ignition. All engines in this family have a 5.2:1 compression ratio and were designed to run on fuel with a minimum octane rating of 73.

The entire family of engines had its certification terminated on 1 November 1941. Engines produced before that date are still certified, but none can be produced after that date.

== Variants ==
A40
Single ignition, 37 hp (28 kW) at 2550 rpm, dry weight 144 lb (65 kg)
A40-2
Single ignition, 37 hp (28 kW) at 2550 rpm, dry weight 144 lb (65 kg)
A-40-3
Single ignition, 37 hp (28 kW) at 2550 rpm, dry weight 144 lb (65 kg) Featured cadmium-nickel connecting rod bearings.
A40-4
Single ignition, 40 hp (30 kW) at 2575 rpm, dry weight 144 lb (65 kg), Steel backed connecting rod inserts
A40-5
Dual ignition, 40 hp (30 kW) at 2575 rpm, dry weight 156 lb (71 kg)

== Applications ==
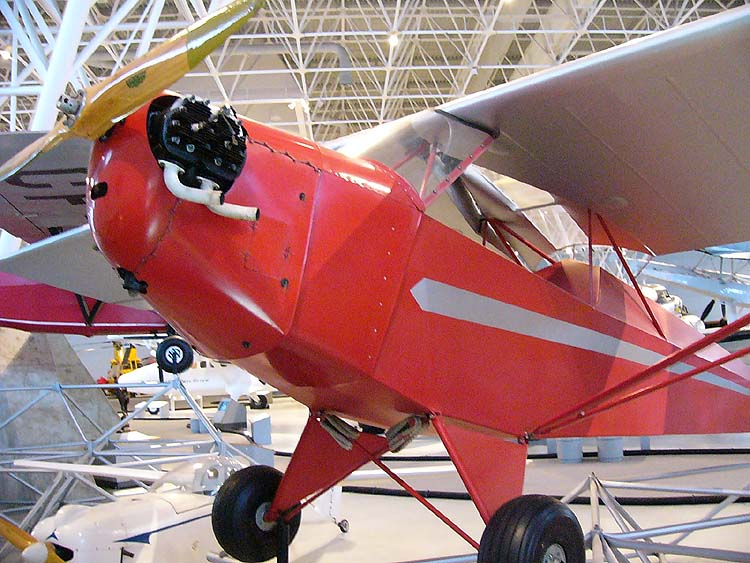
Taylor E-2 Cub showing its A-40 engine with the cylinders protruding through the cowling, Canada Aviation Museum.

- Aeronca KC
- Arup S-2
- Heath Parasol LNA-40
- Miller M-5 Belly Flopper
- Nicholson Junior KN-2
- Piper J-3 Cub
- Porterfield CP-40 Zephyr
- Rose Parakeet
- Taylor E-2 Cub
- Piper J-2 Cub
- Taylorcraft A
- Welch OW-5M

== Engines on display ==
- Old Rhinebeck Aerodrome

== Specifications (A40-5) ==
Data from Type Certificate Data Sheet 72, Jane's 1938

=== General characteristics ===
- Type: 4-cylinder air-cooled horizontally opposed aircraft piston engine
- Bore: 3.125 in (79.3 mm)
- Stroke: 3.75 in (95.3 mm)
- Displacement: 115 cu in (1.9 L)
- Length: 27.9375 in (710 mm)
- Width: 26.4375 in (672 mm)
- Height: 20.4375 in (519 mm)
- Dry weight: 154 lb (69.9 kg) dry with carburrettor and magnetos

=== Components ===
- Valvetrain: One intake and one exhaust side-valve per cylinder with a flathead valve design.
- Fuel system: CMC Stromberg NA-82 carburetor
- Fuel type: minimum 73 octane
- Cooling system: Air-cooled

=== Performance ===
- Power output: 40 hp (30 kW) at 2,575 rpm
- Specific power: 0.35 hp/(cu in) (15.3 kW/L)
- Compression ratio: 5.2:1
- Specific fuel consumption: 0.72 lb/(hp h) (0.439 kg/(kW h))
- Oil consumption: 0.025 lb/(hp h) (0.0153 kg/(kW h))
- Power-to-weight ratio: 0.28 hp/lb (0.45 kW/kg)

== See also ==
Comparable engines

- Menasco M-50

Related lists

- List of aircraft engines
