= Commonwealth Skyranger =

Skyranger
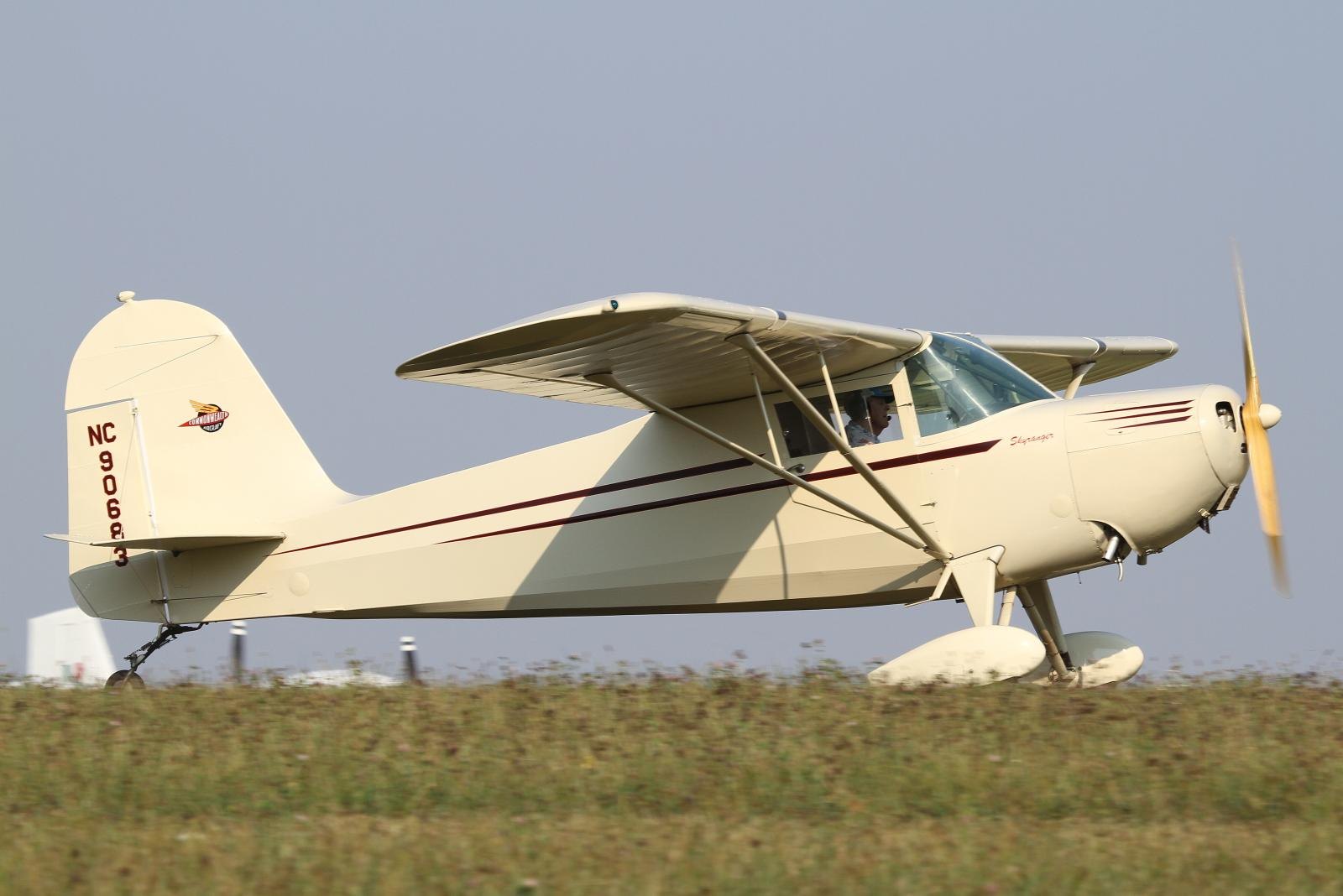
- Commonwealth Skyranger 185

General information
- Type: Utility aircraft
- Manufacturer: Rearwin, Commonwealth
- Designer: Gene Salvay and George A. Stark
- Number built: 358

History
- Manufactured: 1940-1942, 1945-1947
- First flight: 9 April 1940

The Commonwealth Skyranger, first produced as the Rearwin Skyranger, was the last design of Rearwin Aircraft before the company was purchased by a new owner and renamed Commonwealth Aircraft. It was a side-by-side, two-seat, high-wing taildragger.

== Development ==
The Rearwin company had specialized in aircraft powered by small radial engines, such as their Sportster and Cloudster, and had even purchased the assets of LeBlond Engines to make small radial engines in-house in 1937. By 1940, however, it was clear Rearwin would need a design powered by a small horizontally opposed engine to remain competitive. Intended for sport pilots and flying businessmen, the "Rearwin Model 165" first flew on April 9, 1940. Originally named the "Ranger," Ranger Engines (who also sold several engines named "Ranger") protested, and Rearwin renamed the design "Skyranger." The overall design and construction methods allowed Rearwin to take orders for Skyrangers then deliver the aircraft within 10 weeks.

The Skyranger's development in 1940 came shortly before the U.S. entered World War II. At that time, the U.S. government was purchasing almost any airplane in the two-seat, 50-90 horsepower class as training aircraft for the Civilian Pilot Training Program ("CPT Program" or "CPTP"), intended to develop tens of thousands of pilots for the possibility of U.S. involvement in the war. However, unlike its contemporaries heavily used in the CPTP such as the Piper Cub, Taylorcraft, Interstate Cadet, and Porterfield Collegiate, the Skyranger was rejected by the government for CPTP use as too challenging to fly.

By 1942, Rearwin had produced only 82 Skyrangers (compared to hundreds or thousands of its competitors' planes) when World War II forced production to halt.

In 1945 Commonwealth Aircraft re-established production of the Skyranger. The first 12 had to be hand-built, as the original jigs and tooling were recycled or scrapped during World War II. In 1946, production shifted to Valley Stream, New York. the Commonwealth Skyranger had minor modifications but was essentially the same as the pre-war aircraft. Commonwealth went bankrupt in 1946, and was dissolved in March of 1947, partly because the pre-war design failed to compete with new designs and cheap war surplus aircraft.

== Design ==
The Skyranger was a high-wing light plane seating two people side-by-side. It had a conventional landing gear with a tailwheel. It was constructed with a fabric-covered steel tube fuselage and wooden wing (with a semi-symmetrical airfoil cross-section. The Skyranger was powered by a variety of opposed engines made by Continental Motors and the Franklin Engine Company, ranging from 65 to 90 horsepower. It sold for $1,795 to $2,400.

The Skyranger handled differently from the other planes in its class (such as the Cub, Taylorcraft, Cadet, Collegiate, and Aeronca Chief), with a "heavy-airplane feel" (heavy controls, exceptional stability). With an unusually large vertical stabilizer for its size, the Skyranger was exceptionally susceptible to crosswinds during landing and taxiing. Unusually for the time and aircraft in its class, the Skyranger was also designed with slots in its outer wings to allow controllability at lower speeds.

== Variants ==
Rearwin Model 165
Prototype of the Skyranger family and first made public as the "Ranger," it featured a 65hp Continental A65 engine. The 65hp engine was later offered as a lower-cost option. At least 1 built.
Rearwin Skyranger 175
Initial production version, the model number was increased to reflect the use of a 75hp Continental A65 engine as standard.
Rearwin Skyranger 180
Up-engined version of the Skyranger 175 using the 80hp Continental A80 engine.
Rearwin Skyranger 180F
Up-engined version of the Skyranger 175 using the 80hp Franklin Engines' 4AC-176-F3. The engine change required a new cowling, but introduced an automotive-type starter and generator. New options increased the gross weight of the plane by 100lbs, so the fuselage tubing was strengthened.
Rearwin Skyranger 190F
A further up-engined version of the Skyranger 180F using the 90hp Franklin Engines' 4AC-199-E3. 1 built.
Commonwealth Skyranger 175
The Rearwin Skyranger 175 with minor modifications.
Commonwealth Skyranger 185
Commonwealth Skyranger 175 with an 85hp Continental engine. This was the standard version produced by Commonwealth Aircraft Company.

Rearwin also offered a low-cost version of the Skyranger from 1940 to 1941.

== Aircraft on display ==
- Rearwin Skyranger
  - 1 Rearwin Skyranger 175 is on display at the Mid-America Air Museum, Liberal, Kansas.
  - 1 Rearwin Skyranger 175 is on display at the Fargo Air Museum, Fargo, North Dakota.
- Commonwealth Skyranger
  - 1 Commonwealth Skyranger 185 is on display at the Cradle of Aviation Museum, Long Island, New York.
  - 1 Commonwealth Skyranger 185 is on display at the Western Antique Aeroplane & Auto Museum, Hood River, Oregon.
  - 1 Commonwealth Skyranger 185 is on display at the North Carolina Transportation Museum, Spencer, North Carolina.
  - 1 Commonwealth Skyranger 185 is flown by the Mid-Atlantic Air Museum, Reading, Pennsylvania.

== Specifications (Model 185 Skyranger) ==
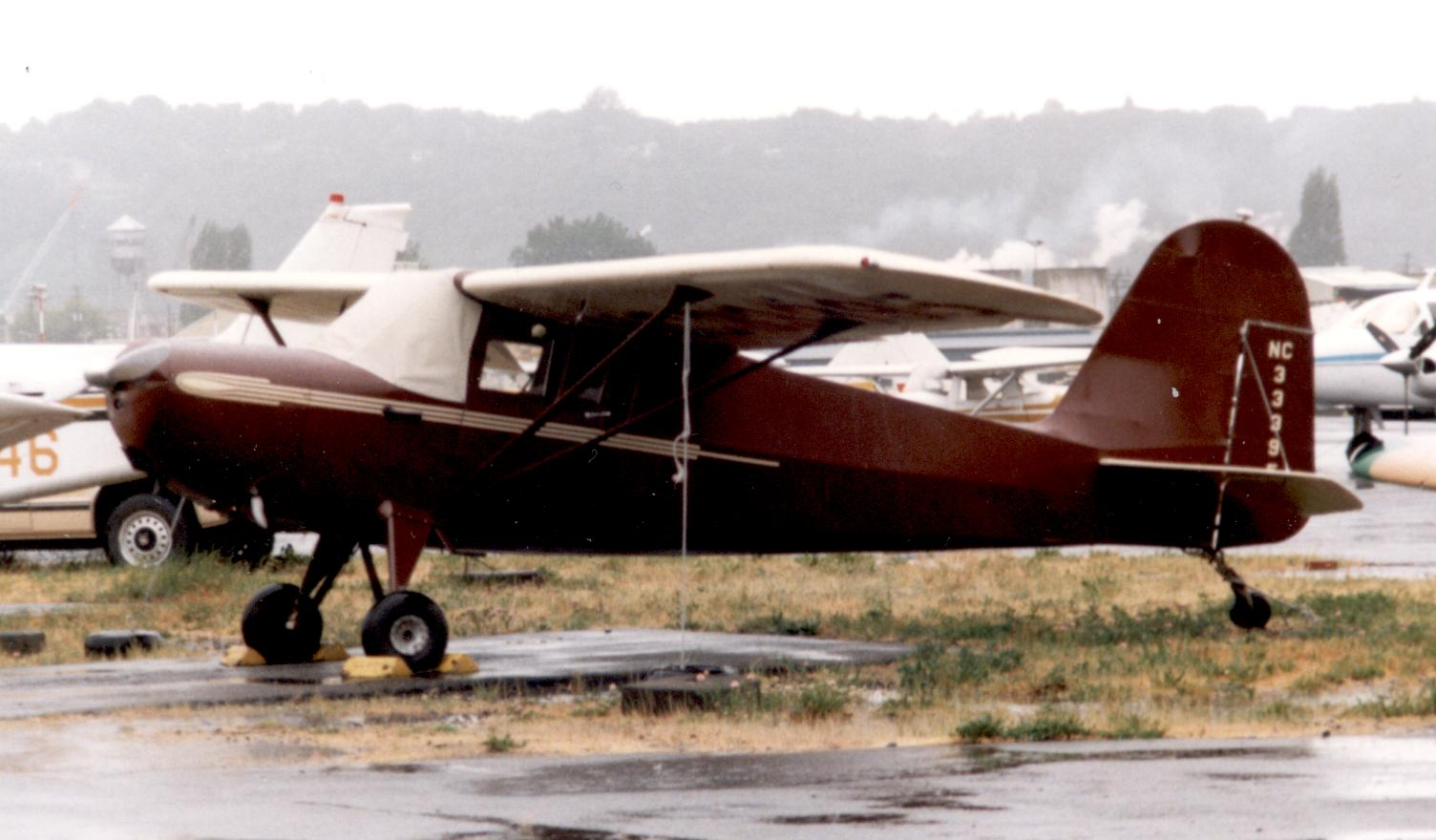
Commonwealth 185, built in 1946, at Boeing Field, Seattle, in May 1989

Data from Jane's all the World's Aircraft 1947

General characteristics

- Crew: 2
- Length: 21 ft 9 in (6.63 m)
- Wingspan: 34 ft 0 in (10.36 m)
- Height: 6 ft 7 in (2 m)
- Wing area: 164.6 sq ft (15.29 m^{2})
- Empty weight: 910 lb (413 kg)
- Gross weight: 1,450 lb (658 kg)
- Fuel capacity: 24 US gal (20 imp gal; 91 L) in two wing tanks
- Powerplant: 1 × Continental C85 4-cyl. air-cooled horizontally-opposed piston engine, 85 hp (63 kW)
- Propellers: 2-bladed fixed pitch wooden airscrew, 6 ft 6 in (1.98 m) diameter

Performance

- Maximum speed: 114 mph (183 km/h, 99 kn)
- Cruise speed: 103 mph (166 km/h, 90 kn)
- Landing speed: 48 mph (42 kn; 77 km/h)
- Range: 600 mi (970 km, 520 nmi)
- Endurance: 5 hrs 30 minutes (with reserve)
- Service ceiling: 14,000 ft (4,300 m)
- Rate of climb: 650 ft/min (3.3 m/s)
- Wing loading: 8.81 lb/sq ft (43.0 kg/m^{2})
- Power/mass: 17.06 lb/hp (10.3 kg/kW)
