= Rearwin Cloudster =

Cloudster
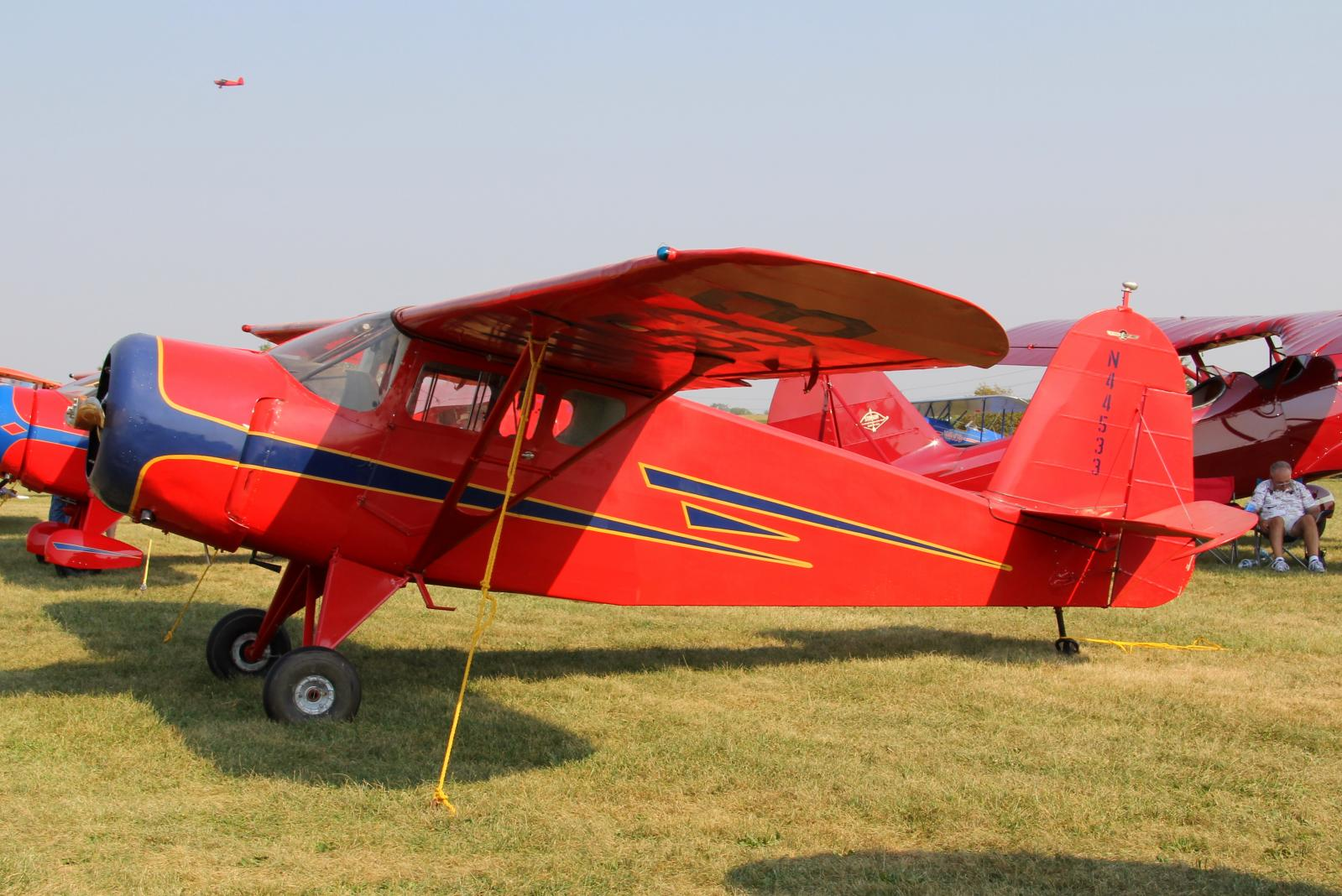
- Rearwin 8135

General information
- Type: Utility aircraft
- National origin: United States
- Manufacturer: Rearwin
- Designer: Robert Rummell
- Number built: 125

History
- Manufactured: 1939-1942
- First flight: 1939

The Rearwin Cloudster was a two or three-seat civil utility aircraft produced by the Rearwin Aircraft & Engines Company of Kansas City, Missouri beginning in 1939. It was a strut-braced, high-wing monoplane of conventional design with an enclosed cabin and fixed, taildragger undercarriage. One specialized version was produced as a trainer for Pan American Airways.

== Development ==
Rearwin Aircraft began developing the Cloudster in 1938, while still selling the older Speedster and Sportster. The goal was to develop an aircraft with side-by-side seating, using as much tooling and existing equipment as possible. Widening either the Speedster or Sportster was considered, but by the time the design was completed, the strut geometry, landing gear, fuselage structure, engine installation, and cabin had to be changed. Development of the prototype took 6 months.

Originally the plane was dubbed the "Rearwin Coupe," a name which changed to "Cloudster" after a month. The 90hp prototype (Model 8090) was never developed for production, instead the basic Model 8125 used a 120hp Ken-Royce 7F engine also made by Rearwin. In 1940, the Model 8135 added a third, sideways-facing, seat to the Model 8125.

Pan American Airways founder Juan Trippe, who personally owned a Rearwin Sportster, approached the company in 1941 to develop an instrument trainer. The existing Model 8135 was redesigned and certified in four months as the 8135T. Pan Am bought 5 of the design, while another 20 went to various operators.

== Design ==
The Cloudster was a two- or three-seat aircraft of high-wing design and conventional landing gear arrangement. Designed to seat two side-by-side, the Model 8135 introduced a third seat behind the front row which could be accessed by folding the right-hand seat forward. The last model, Model 8135T, sat two in tandem.

All versions used Ken-Royce radial engines of 90-120hp, as the engines were produced by a division of the Rearwin Aircraft & Engines Company and the company was experienced building airplanes with small radial engines. Beginning in late 1941, the Cloudster used a NACA cowling hinged along the top for engine access.

The interior of the Cloudster (or at least the prototype) used surplus cloth from Cadillac and a simulated woodgrain panel. A baggage compartment held 50lbs.

The tandem seating Model 8135T introduced jettisonable doors for both the instructor and student pilot, dual controls, and seats with removable cushions to accommodate backpack or seat parachutes. The student sat in the rear seat with their own controls and a removable instrument panel. The 8135T included fittings for a blackout curtain surrounding the student for instrument training, while allowing the instructor to maintain normal visibility.

== Operational history ==
In 1941, 25 Model 8125 Cloudsters were exported to the Aero Club of Iran. The aircraft remained in service as of 1945, with a .30 caliber machine gun mounted on the left wing strut outside the propeller arc.

From August 1941 to July 1942, 25 Model 8135T trainers were sold to various operators. How long they served is unknown.

== Variants ==
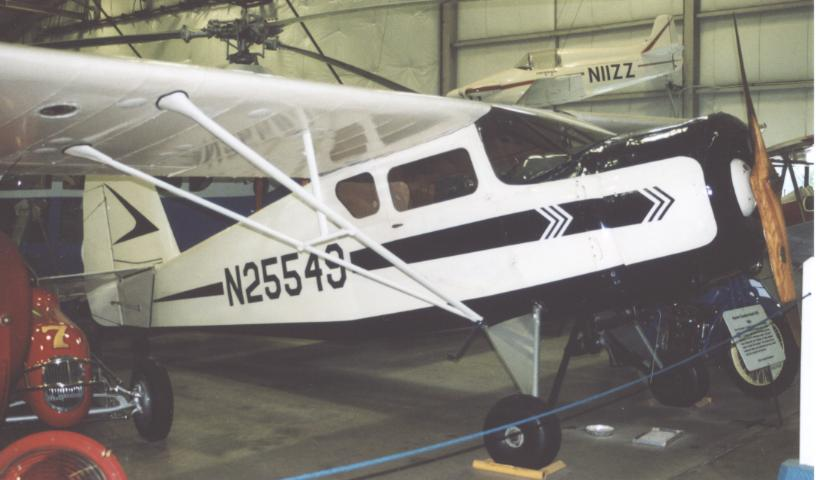
8135 Cloudster at New England Air Museum, Bradley Locks, CT

Cloudster 8090
Version with Ken-Royce 5F 90 h.p. engine with two seats side-by-side.
Cloudster 8125
Version with Ken-Royce 7F 120 h.p. engine with two seats side-by-side.
Cloudster 8135
Version with Ken-Royce 7G 120 h.p engine with two front row seats side-by-side and a third, side-facing seat in a second row.

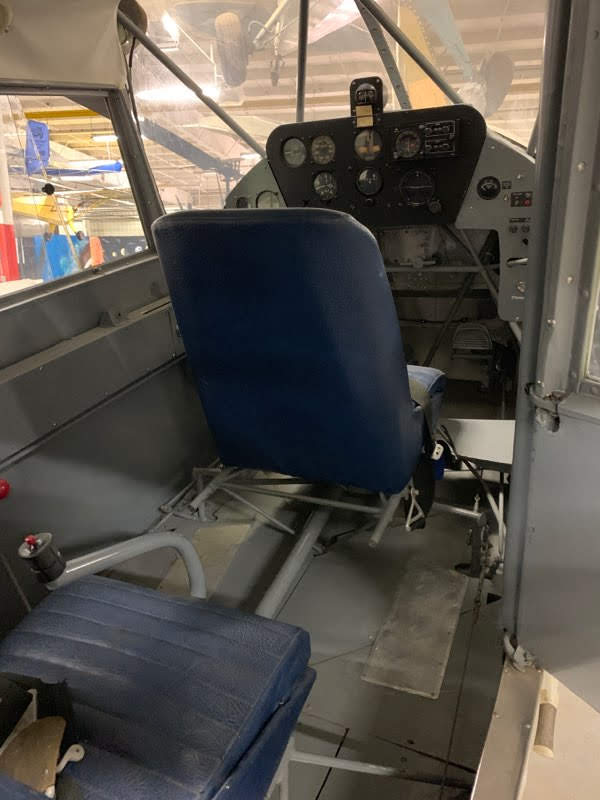
8135T with second instrument panel removed at the Mid-America Air Museum, Liberal, KS

Cloudster 8135T
Version of Cloudster 8135 converted to two seats in tandem, with provisions for pilot training and instrument flying training designed originally for Pan Am. 25 built.
Rearwin C-102
A Cloudster 8135 impressed by the US Army Air Force as the UC-102A.

== Operators ==
=== Model 8125 ===
- Iran - The Aero Club of Iran operated 25 Model 8125s, eventually modified to hold a .30 caliber machine gun.
- Cartoonist Zack Mosley owned a Model 8125 and often featured it in The Adventures of Smilin' Jack.

=== Model 8135T ===
- Pan American Airways operated 5 Model 8135Ts.
- Parks Air College operated 5 Model 8135Ts.
- American Flyers Airline operated 3 Model 8135Ts
- Spartan College of Aeronautics operated 5 Model 8135Ts.
- Ailor Sales Corporation
- Civil Aeronautics Authority
- Transcontinental and Western Air (TWA)

== Specifications (8135) ==
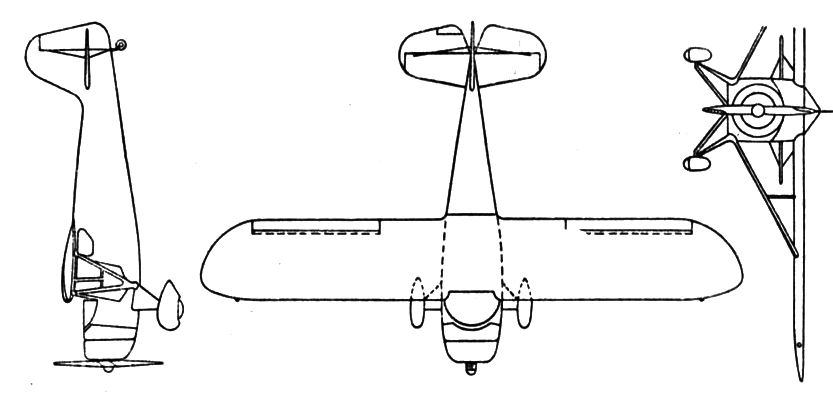
Rearwin Cloudster 3-view drawing from L'Aerophile February 1940

Data from "Rearwin Cloudster"

General characteristics

- Crew: One pilot
- Capacity: 1–2 passengers
- Length: 21 ft 6 in (6.55 m)
- Wingspan: 34 ft 2 in (10.41 m)
- Height: 7 ft 4 in (2.23 m)
- Wing area: 162 sq ft (15.0 m^{2})
- Empty weight: 1,140 lb (520 kg)
- Gross weight: 1,900 lb (860 kg)
- Powerplant: 1 × Ken-Royce 7G , 125 hp (93 kW)

Performance

- Maximum speed: 135 mph (216 km/h, 117 kn)
- Range: 600 mi (960 km, 520 nmi)
- Service ceiling: 16,000 ft (4,900 m)
- Rate of climb: 860 ft/min (4.4 m/s)

== Bibliography ==
- Hiscock, Michael (May 2008). "Après 10 ans de restoration: Un "Cloudster" sinon rien" [After a 10-year Restoration: A "Cloudster" or Nothing]. Le Fana de l'Aviation (in French) (462): 30–40. ISSN 0757-4169.
