= Rearwin Speedster =

Speedster
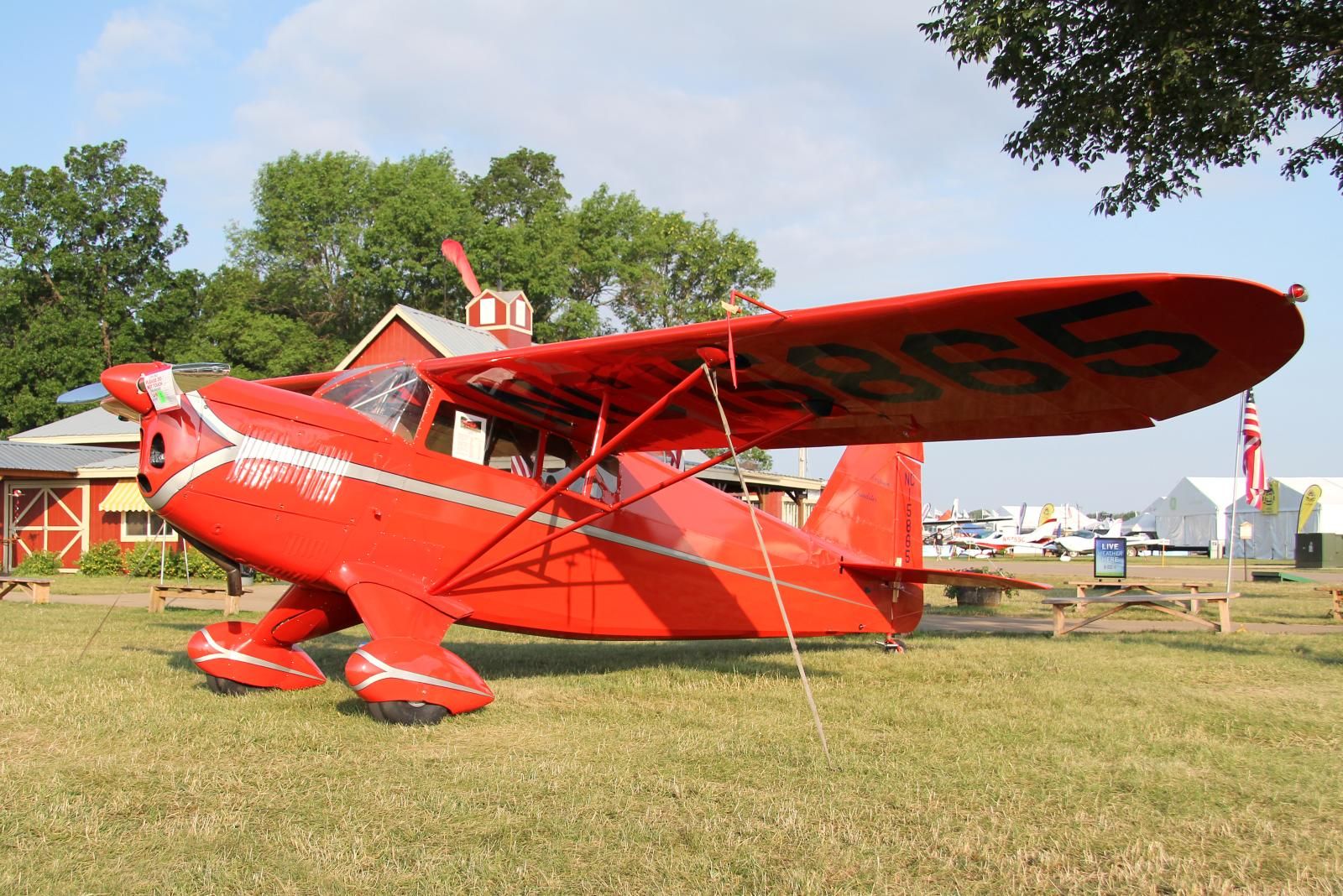

General information
- Type: Sport aircraft
- National origin: United States
- Manufacturer: Rearwin Aircraft & Engines
- Number built: 11

History
- First flight: 1934

The Rearwin Speedster was a two-seat, high-wing, sport aircraft produced by Rearwin Airplanes Inc. in the United States in the 1930s.

== Development ==
Design of the Speedster started in 1933 as sales of the Rearwin Ken-Royce and Junior began to flag in response to the Great Depression. While the previous aircraft had been built by "Rearwin Airplanes," a joint venture between Rae Rearwin and an investor, the Speedster was built by Rearwin's newly formed company "Rearwin Aircraft." Rearwin had negotiated the use of Rearwin Airplane's equipment and property from his investor since it was being underutilized during the Great Depression. The initial design work proceeded smoothly, with first flight of the prototype occurring on July 11, 1934. However, efforts to certify the design were unsuccessful as it could not meet the Civil Aeronautics Authority's spin recovery rules (later relaxed).

Multiple engineers were hired and passed through Rearwin as the company attempted to improve the aircraft's spin recovery. Work was suspended between 1934 and 1937. By the time it was resumed in 1938, the ACE Cirrus engine that had powered the two prototypes was out of production, and Speedsters produced in series had Menasco C-4 engines. Rearwin had developed and begun selling the Rearwin Sportster and would also develop and sell the Rearwin Cloudster once the Speedster finally entered production.

== Design ==
The Speedster was intended as a good-performing, two-seat, high-wing monoplane with an enclosed cabin. As such, it was designed around the ACE Cirrus, an inverted, four-cylinder inline engine that was tightly faired into the body of the airplane. To maintain a small frontal area, the cabin accommodations were cramped. Passenger and pilot were seated in tandem. After the Cirrus engine went out of production, the Menasco C-4 was substituted.

To address the issues with spin recovery, the flight controls were given improved bearings and rudder-centering springs. The tail surface was enlarged and redesigned, becoming a distinctive feature of the model. The gaps between the ailerons and the wings were also redesigned to better maintain airflow.

== Variants ==
- Speedster 6000 - Prototype. Initially with in-line ACE Cirrus engine then the Menasco C-4. (1 built)
- Speedster 6000M - production version with Menasco C-4 engine (10 built)

== Surviving aircraft ==
By early 2018, four examples of the model 6000 remained registered as active with the Federal Aviation Administration. A model 6000M is preserved at the Experimental Aircraft Associations AirVenture Museum at Oshkosh, Wisconsin.

== Specifications (6000M) ==
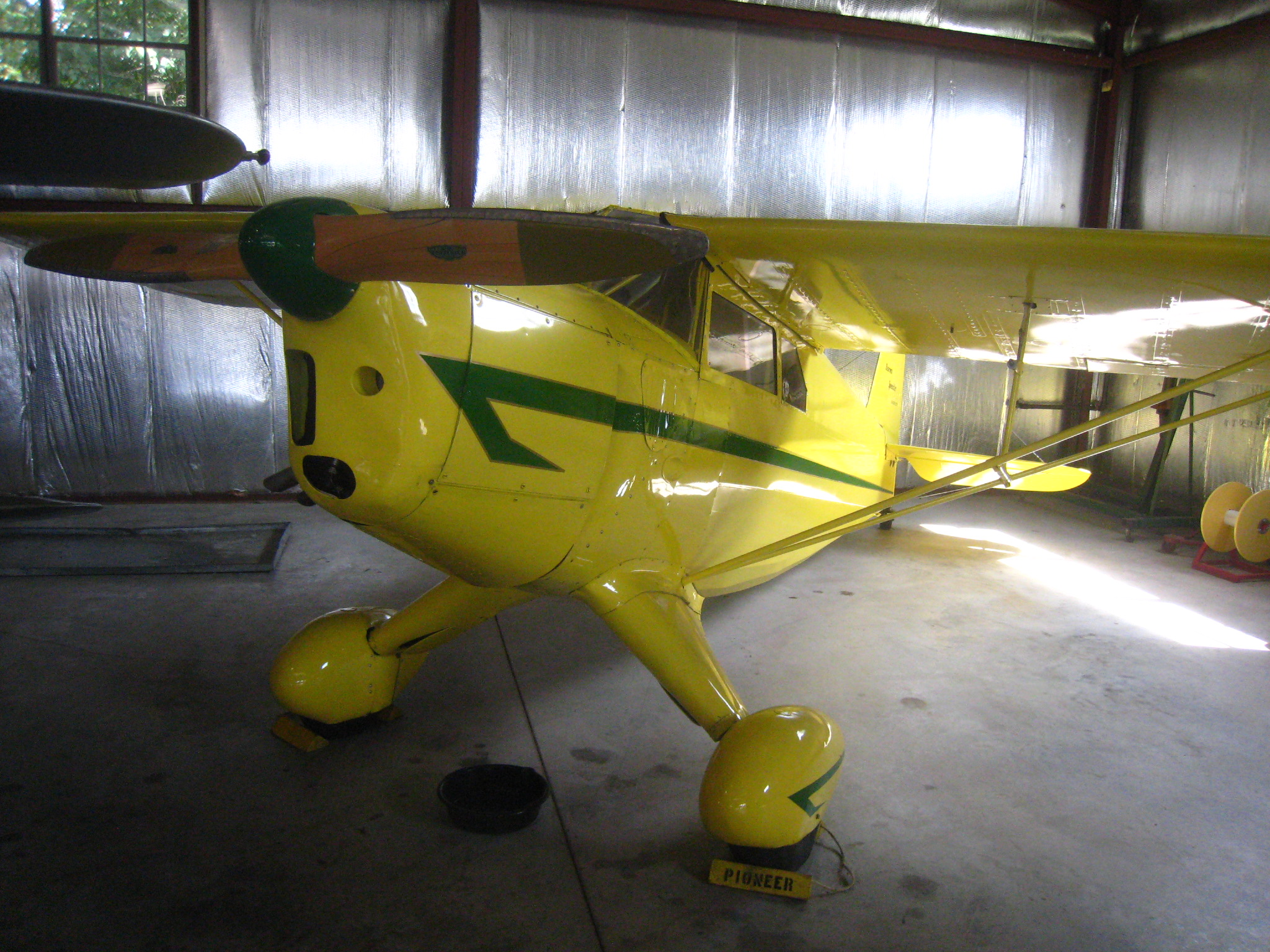
Rearwin Speedster

Data from

General characteristics

- Crew: One pilot
- Capacity: 1 passenger
- Length: 22 ft 2 in (6.76 m)
- Wingspan: 32 ft 0 in (9.75 m)
- Height: 6 ft 8 in (2.03 m)
- Wing area: 145 sq ft (13.5 m^{2})
- Empty weight: 1,052 lb (477 kg)
- Gross weight: 1,668 lb (757 kg)
- Powerplant: 1 × Menasco C-4 , 125 hp (93 kW)

Performance

- Maximum speed: 166 mph (267 km/h, 144 kn)
- Cruise speed: 140 mph (230 km/h, 120 kn)
- Range: 600 mi (970 km, 520 nmi)
- Rate of climb: 750 ft/min (3.8 m/s)
