= Aeronca L =

1930s American cabin monoplane

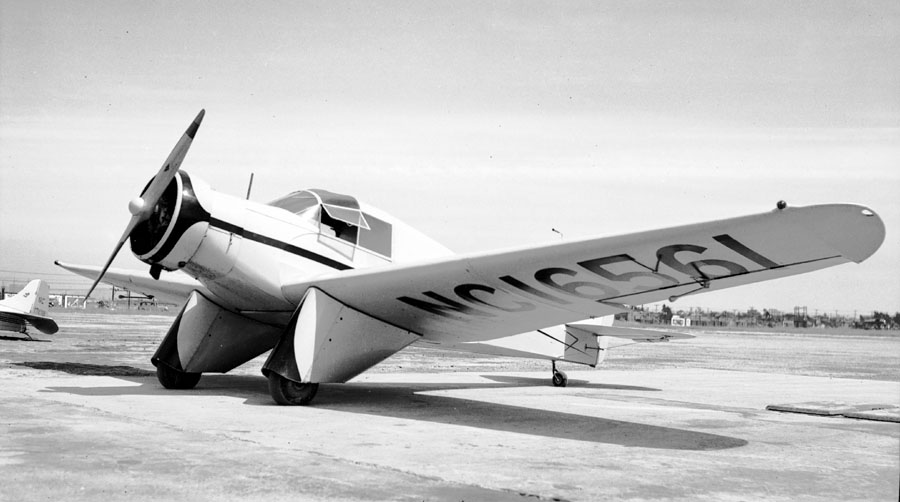
- An Aeronca LB

General information
- Type: Cabin monoplane
- National origin: United States of America
- Manufacturer: Aeronca Aircraft
- Primary user: Private pilot owners
- Number built: 65

History
- Introduction date: 1935

The Aeronca L is a 1930s American cabin monoplane designed and built, in small numbers, by Aeronca Aircraft. It differed significantly from other Aeronca planes by the use of radial engines, streamlining, and a cantilever low wing.

== Design and construction ==
Quite unlike other Aeronca designs, the Model L was a "cantilever" (no external struts for bracing) low-wing monoplane, that featured side-by-side seating in a completely enclosed cabin. The design reflected the greater attention being paid to aerodynamics in the period, including large wheel spats for the fixed undercarriage and a Townend ring for the engine. The aircraft was of mixed-construction with a welded steel fuselage and wings with spruce spars and ribs, all covered with fabric.

Initial attempts to use Aeronca's own engines proved inadequate, and the company turned to small radial engines from other suppliers, particularly neighboring Cincinnati engine manufacturer LeBlond.

== Operational history ==
The Model L was mainly flown by private pilot owners. The plane was not a big seller. Difficulty with engine sources, and a destructive flood, in 1937, at Aeronca's factory at Cincinnati's Lunken Airport, took the energy out of the program, and Aeronca went back to high-wing light aircraft.

With the end of sales to Aeronca, LeBlond sold their engine-manufacturing operation to an Aeronca-rival planemaker, Kansas City-based Rearwin Aircraft, who resumed production of the engines under the brand name "Ken-Royce," largely for use in Rearwin planes.

== Variants ==
LA
Fitted with a 70 hp (52 kW) LeBlond 5DE engine, 9 built
LB
Fitted with an 85 hp (63 kW) LeBlond 5DF engine, 29 built
LC
Fitted with a 90 hp (67 kW) Warner Scarab Jr engine, 15 built

LCS
A single LC, [NC16289], was fitted with floats to become the LCS, carrying a load of 659 lb (299 kg) for 450 mi (391 nmi; 724 km) at 100 mph (87 kn; 161 km/h).

LD
Fitted with a 90 hp (67 kW) Lambert R-266 5-cyl. radial engine

== Surviving aircraft ==
The EAA AirVenture Museum in Oshkosh, Wisconsin has a 1937 Aeronca LC in its collection.

The Western Antique Aeroplane & Automobile Museum of Hood River, Oregon, has an airworthy Aeronica LC. Aeronca LB N16271 was in final stages of restoration as of January 2015; Aeronca LC NC17442 (cn 2056) is also on display in the museum.

The Kelch Aviation Museum of Brodhead, Wisconsin has an airworthy Aeronca LB, NC16262 s/n 2016 as of February, 2026 and is on display.

== Specifications (Model LC) ==
Data from U.S. Civil Aircraft: Vol. 7

General characteristics

- Crew: 1
- Capacity: 1 passenger
- Length: 22 ft 4 in (6.81 m)
- Wingspan: 36 ft 0 in (10.97 m)
- Height: 7 ft 0 in (2.13 m)
- Wing area: 150 sq ft (14 m^{2})
- Airfoil: root: NACA 2218; tip: NACA 2209
- Empty weight: 1,034 lb (469 kg)
- Gross weight: 1,680 lb (762 kg)
- Fuel capacity: 28 US gal (23 imp gal; 110 L)
- Powerplant: 1 × Warner Scarab Junior 5-cylinder air-cooled radial piston engine, 90 hp (67 kW)
- Propellers: 2-bladed fixed-pitch propeller

Performance

- Maximum speed: 123 mph (198 km/h, 107 kn)
- Cruise speed: 108 mph (174 km/h, 94 kn)
- Stall speed: 48 mph (77 km/h, 42 kn) (landing speed)
- Range: 520 mi (840 km, 450 nmi)
- Service ceiling: 15,500 ft (4,700 m)
- Rate of climb: 650 ft/min (3.3 m/s)
