= Rosa Schorling =

Brazilian aviator, parachutist, and educator

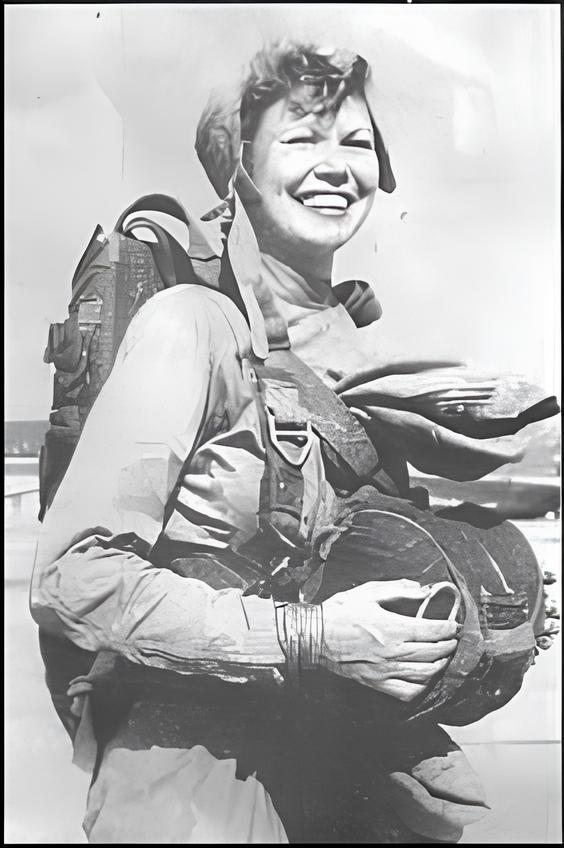
- Rosa Schorling during a parachuting event
- Born: Rosa Helena Schorling Albuquerque; July 15, 1919; Espirito Santo, Brazil
- Died: December 11, 2017 (aged 98); Domingos Martins, São Paulo, Brazil
- Education: Brazilian Army Parachutist School
- Occupations: Aviator, Parachutist, Educator
- Years active: 1939–1950s
- Spouse: Tenente Raymundo Mendes Albuquerque (m. 1960; died 2013)

Rosa Helena Schorling Albuquerque (July 15, 1919 – December 11, 2017) was a pioneering Brazilian aviator and parachutist, known as the first woman to make a parachute jump in Brazil. Born in São Paulo de Biriricas, Espírito Santo, she gained early recognition for her interest in unconventional activities for women of her time, such as flying and driving. In 1940, at 21, she performed her first jump over Guanabara Bay during Semana da Asa, earning national fame. Throughout her career, she completed more than 130 jumps, becoming a key figure in Brazilian sports aviation and parachuting.

Beyond her achievements as a parachutist, Rosa Schorling also contributed to education as a teacher and school principal. She spent most of her life in Domingos Martins, where she created a personal museum, the Sítio Rosenhausen, to preserve her history and accomplishments. She died in 2017 at 98 years old due to complications from a femur fracture. Her life was chronicled in the book Rosa Helena Schorling, além da folha de vento by journalist Fabrício Fernandes, which documents her impact on aviation and parachuting in Brazil.

== Early life ==
Rosa Helena Schorling Albuquerque was born on July 15, 1919, in Espírito Santo. The daughter of João Ricardo Hermann Schorling, of German descent, and Rosa Wlasak Schorling, of Austrian origin, she moved as a baby to the Campinho region in Domingos Martins, where she spent most of her life. From an early age, she showed an interest in activities considered unconventional for women at the time, like vehicle piloting and aviation. In 1932, at the age of 12, she obtained her professional driver's license, becoming one of the first women in Brazil to do so. The following year, she also obtained a motorcycle license. Her passion for aviation was sparked when she saw an airplane fly over the school she attended in Vitória. Determined to pursue a career in aviation, she became a teacher to fulfill her father's wishes before starting her flight training.

=== Aviation and parachuting career ===
In 1939, Rosa Schorling obtained her pilot's license from the Aeroclube do Brasil, becoming the first female pilot from Espírito Santo and the eighth woman in the country to do so. The following year, she participated in the female aerial competitions during Semana da Asa in Rio de Janeiro, where she took first place. During the event, she volunteered for a parachute jump, making history as the first woman to perform such a feat in Brazil. The jump took place on November 8, 1940, from a Bellanca airplane, at a height of 1,000 meters, over Guanabara Bay. The event was widely covered in the press, cementing her place in Brazilian aviation and parachuting history. In 1950, she joined the newly created Paratroopers School of the Brazilian Army in Rio de Janeiro, where she received her military brevet after eight months of training. Throughout her career, she completed over 130 jumps, including demonstrations at civic events and competitions in Brazil and abroad.

== End of life ==
In January 1955, after the death of her father, Rosa Helena returned permanently to Sítio Rosenhausen, where she lived with her mother. In 1960, she married retired Brazilian Army lieutenant Raymundo Mendes Albuquerque, and they had a son, João Raymundo, who died in January 1962 at only five months old. Her mother, Rosa Wlasak Schorling, died in January 1978 at the age of 86.
