= Warner Scarab Junior =

1930s American piston aircraft engine

Scarab Junior
- Type: Radial engine
- Manufacturer: Warner Aircraft Corporation
- First run: November 1930
- Developed from: Warner Scarab

The Warner Scarab Junior was an American, five-cylinder, air-cooled, radial aero engine first produced in 1930. It was a scaled-down derivative of the seven-cylinder Warner Scarab, developing 90 hp (70 kW) against the Scarab's 110 hp (80 kW).

== Applications ==
- Aeronca L
- Culver Dart
- Rearwin Sportster

== Specifications (Warner Scarab Junior 50) ==
Data from FAA Type Certificate Data Sheet (TCDS).

=== General characteristics ===
- Type: Five-cylinder, air-cooled, radial piston engine
- Bore: 4.25 in (108 mm)
- Stroke: 4.25 (108 mm)
- Displacement: 301 cu in (4.93 L)
- Length: 14 in (35.5 cm)
- Height: 36.5 in (93 cm)
- Dry weight: 237 lb (107.5 kg)

=== Components ===
- Valvetrain: 1 inlet and 1 exhaust valve per cylinder
- Fuel system: 1 Holley carburetor
- Fuel type: 54 octane Avgas

=== Performance ===
- Power output: 90 hp (67 kW) at 2,050 rpm
- Compression ratio: 5.2:1
- Power-to-weight ratio: 0.38 hp/lb (0.62 kW/kg)

== See also ==
Related development

- Warner Scarab

Comparable engines

- Armstrong Siddeley Genet
- Kinner K-5

Related lists

- List of aircraft engines
