= Salvay-Stark Skyhopper =

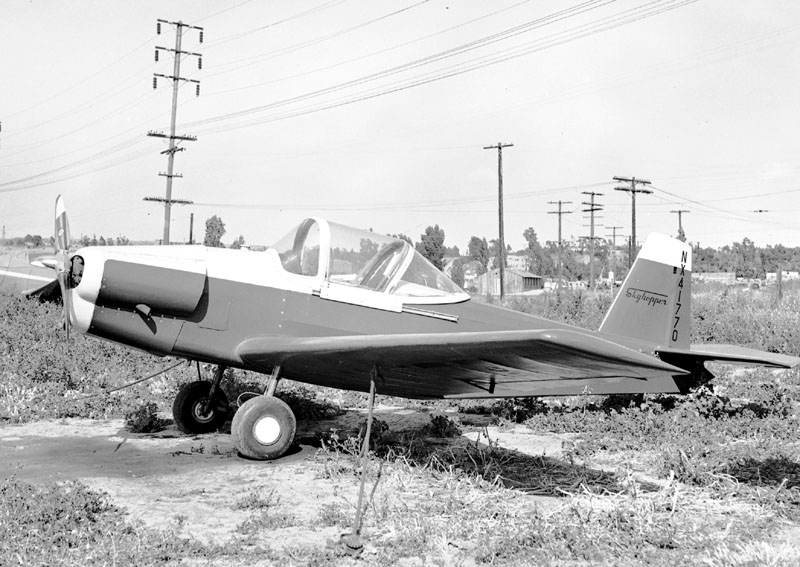

General information
- Type: Homebuilt sport aircraft
- National origin: United States of America
- Manufacturer: Salvay-Stark Aircraft Company, Skyhopper Airplanes Inc.
- Designer: Gene Salvay and George A. Stark

History
- First flight: March 1945

The Salvay-Stark Skyhopper I is a low-wing single-place homebuilt aircraft designed in 1944.

== Development ==
The Skyhopper design was started in 1944 by two North American Aviation engineers from Kansas City. They had previously partnered on the Commonwealth Skyranger and worked on the B-25 program. It was engineered to the then current Civil Aeronautics Administration CAR-04 standards criteria of the time. As a light aircraft under construction during wartime, permission needed to be granted for tools and materials by the CAA.

== Design ==
The single-seat low-wing aircraft was intended to be open cockpit, but was redesigned to have a full canopy. The fuselage is welded steel tubing. The wings use spruce wood spars and ribs with fabric covering. The controls are actuated with push/pull tubes. The stabilizers are covered with mahogany plywood. The Skyhopper I is the plans built version of the prototype introduced in 1958.

== Operational history ==
The prototype was test flown from Fairfax Airport in Kansas City in March 1945. In 1946, The effort to produce the aircraft as a production certified aircraft under the company name Aviation Boosters Inc. was dropped, but Gene Salvay retained the rights to the aircraft where it could be built as a homebuilt aircraft.

== Variants ==
- Skyhopper I - original version of the skyhopper. Continental 50 hp engine.
- Skyhopper II - designed in 1962 to sit two passengers side by side via a 14 in (36 cm) widening of the Skyhopper 10 fuselage design. It was built by Ralph Thenhaus of Van Nuys, California.
- A two-seat tandem modification of the Skyhopper was built using a Continental O-200 engine.
- Trefethen Sport-Aire II - A wider fuselage tricycle gear version based on Stark's Super Skyhopper jigs. Built by Stark, Art Thistle and Al Trefethen. Other changes made were a swept tail, a tapered wing, and a Lycoming O-295 engine.

== Specifications (Salvay-Stark Skyhopper I) ==
Data from experimenter

General characteristics

- Length: 18 ft 7 in (5.66 m)
- Wingspan: 25 ft (7.6 m)
- Wing area: 100 sq ft (9.3 m^{2})
- Airfoil: 23015 (root) 23012 (tip)
- Empty weight: 650 lb (295 kg)
- Gross weight: 950 lb (431 kg)
- Max takeoff weight: 1,170 lb (531 kg)
- Fuel capacity: 15 US gallons (57 litres)
- Powerplant: 1 × Continental A-65 , 65 hp (48 kW)

Performance

- Maximum speed: 110 kn (130 mph, 210 km/h)
- Cruise speed: 100 kn (120 mph, 190 km/h)
- Stall speed: 36 kn (42 mph, 68 km/h)
- Range: 350 nmi (400 mi, 640 km)
