= Gene Salvay =

American aircraft engineer (1919–2016)

- Born: November 15, 1919; Kansas City, Missouri, U.S.
- Died: April 8, 2016 (aged 96); Encino, California, U.S.
- Education: Curtiss-Wright Technical Institute
- Occupation: Aircraft engineer
- Employer(s): No Am Aviation (Rockwell); Lockheed Aviation (Skunk Works)
- Known for: Aircraft design
- Spouse: Betty Mae Goodman
- Parent(s): Israel David Salvay; Anna Salvay

Melvin Eugene Salvay (November 15, 1919 – April 8, 2016) was an American aircraft engineer.

== Early life ==
Salvay was born in Kansas City, Missouri. Gene's father, Israel David Salvay (b:1889 in Veisiejai, Lithuania) was a fashion designer and pattern maker; his mother, Anna (Kiansky) Salvay (b:1895 in Starodub Russia) worked as a seamstress in order to get her sons, Seymour Nathan Salvay (b:1916; Hump Pilot in WWII and, later, Vice President of Milgram Food Stores, Kansas City, MO), and Gene through high school and training as aeronautical engineers.

== Education ==
Salvay graduated Central High School, Kansas City, Missouri, in 1936. That same year, he won 1st place nationally in the Fisher Body coach-building contest with a model of a horse-drawn carriage. The next year, he won 2nd place nationally in the Fisher Body auto-design contest. He continued his education at Curtiss-Wright Technical School, Glendale Airport, California from which he received his engineering degree in Spring 1941: Design courses at Curtiss-Wright were given at the school's campus in Glendale; its more technical engineering courses were given at Caltech.

== Career ==
Salvay went to work for Rearwin, designing the Rearwin Skyranger, later the Commonwealth Skyranger. During World War II, Salvay went to work at North American Aviation in Kansas City developing the B-25 Mitchell. Salvay partnered with a fellow North American Aviation engineer Stark to design the Salvay-Stark Skyhopper in 1944. Initially planned to be a production aircraft, it became an early post-war Homebuilt aircraft. He also helped develop the Morrisey "Nifty", which was the basis for the later Varga Kachina aircraft. Salvay later became the chief engineer for North American Sabreliner

Salvay became the Director of Structural Design for the B-1 Lancer bomber. Later Salvay became director of Lockheed's Trans Atmospheric Vehicle program.

Salvay encouraged Australian aircraft engineers to work with American companies to share experience.

== Family life ==
In 1952, Salvay married Betty May Goodman. In 1964, Salvay moved to Encino, California.

Salvay died in April 2016 at the age of 96.
