= Kansas Aviation Museum =

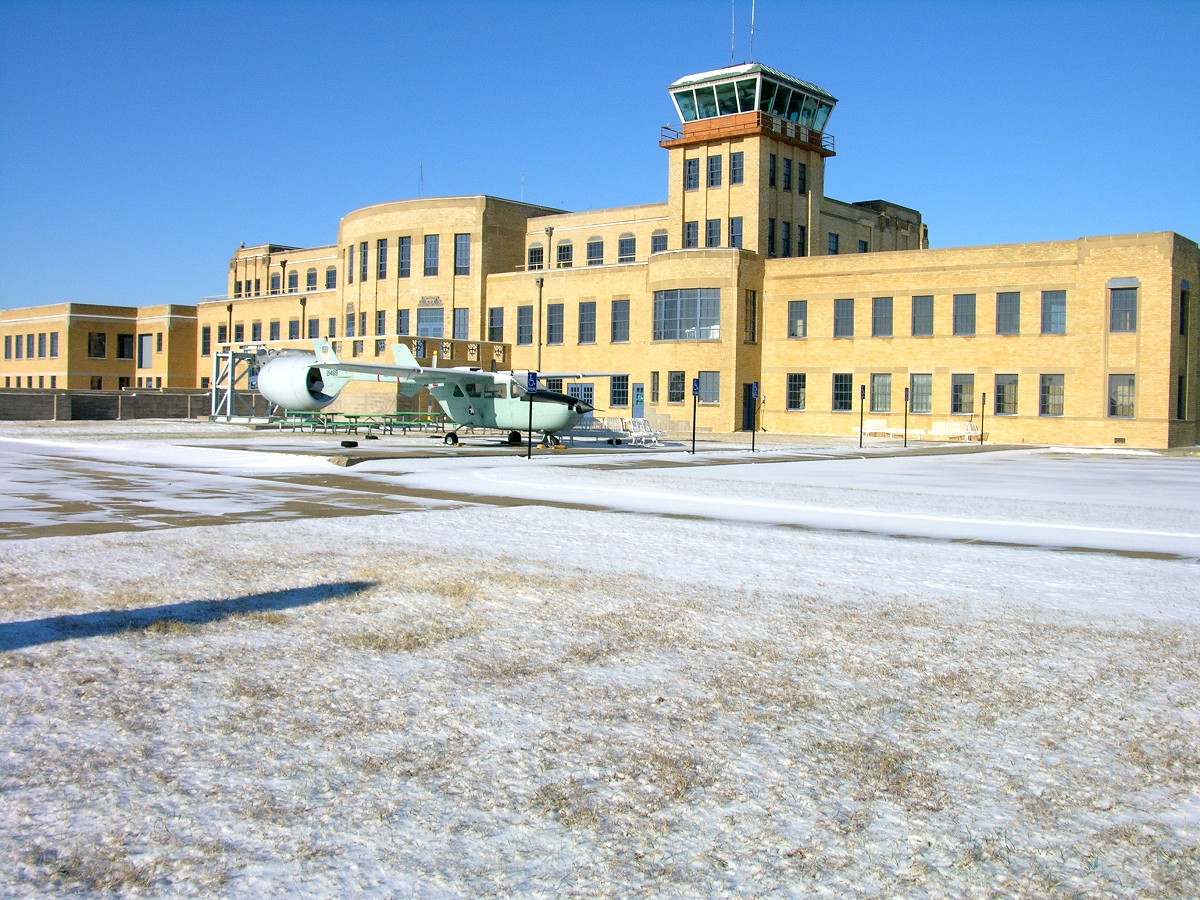
- Museum building

- Location within Kansas Location within the United States
- Former name: Wichita Municipal Airport
- Established: April 19, 1991
- Location: 3350 George Washington Blvd; Wichita, Kansas 67210 USA
- Coordinates: 37°37′56″N 97°16′25″W
- Type: Aviation Museum
- Visitors: 42,205 (2023)
- Founders: Ronald D. "Ron" Ryan; Ed Sykes
- President: Ben Sauceda
- Curator: Logan Daugherty
- Website: kansasaviationmuseum.org
- Administration Building
- U.S. National Register of Historic Places
- Location: McConnell AFB, Wichita, Kansas
- Area: less than one acre
- Architect: Glen H. Thomas
- Architectural style: Art Deco
- NRHP reference No.: 90000908
- Added to NRHP: June 11, 1990

The Kansas Aviation Museum is an aviation museum in Wichita, Kansas, focused on the history of aviation in Kansas. It is located in "Building One", the former Wichita Municipal Airport terminal from 1935 to 1954.

== History ==
After several abortive efforts over the past decades, plans for an aviation museum were spurred by a proposal in 1977 to designate the terminal building as a historic site. However, the Department of Defense recommended against this and the Kansas Air National Guard occupied it. As a result, the Wichita Aeronautical Historical Association considered a different site northwest of Mid-Continent Airport. Then, in 1983, the association formed a task force to study the creation of an aviation museum. However, by August 1987, no progress had been made on construction of a 100,000-square-foot (9,300 m^{2}) facility and major aircraft manufacturers were supporting other, out of state aviation museums. The museum was founded by Ronald D. "Ron" Ryan and Ed Sykes, two members of the Wichita Aeronautical Historical Association. Focus shifted back toward the terminal and, in August 1988, the process of transferring the building from the military to the city had begun. After initially planning a fundraising effort to begin in September 1989 to restore it, the effort was paused until the association obtained the building. The museum reached an agreement with the Liberal Air Museum regarding used of the name Kansas Aviation Museum in July 1991. It was to receive the deed to the building in November.

Due to an unsuccessful airshow at Jabara Airport in 1996, the museum was forced to lay off staff. Ron Ryan made financial donations to offset the loss and work on restoration of the building continued.

A renovation of the terminal was completed by June 2005. In December 2006, it was announced that the B-29 Doc would be moved to the museum and fundraising was to begin to build a 40,000-square-foot (3,700 m^{2}) hangar for it.

Following the donation of four buildings and 15 acres (6.1 ha) land by the adjacent Spirit AeroSystems four months prior, the museum opened an Aircraft Restoration Center in May 2011. The museum's aircraft were damaged by a tornado in April 2012.

With the help of a matching loan from the city, in 2014 the museum began work on a renovation to install an HVAC system, an elevator and handicap accessible restrooms. (Note: Previously, only a smaller portion of the building was climate controlled.) Lon Smith, the museum's executive director since 2008, announced his resignation in March 2015. A new executive director, Daniel Bateman, took over in May. However, he resigned in November and by April of the following year the museum was suffering financial difficulties. Then, in July, the museum's B-52 was significantly damaged by storm debris from the roof the same nearby building as in 2012. The museum received a grant in 2018 from Sedgwick County to restore it.

The museum announced plans in November 2022 to convert the former baggage claim into an exhibit about the terminal and a new area for the hall of fame, move the theater to the hall of fame's previous location and open an exhibit about black aviators in the theater's former location.

The museum suffered light water damage from a storm 17 June 2025.

== Facilities ==
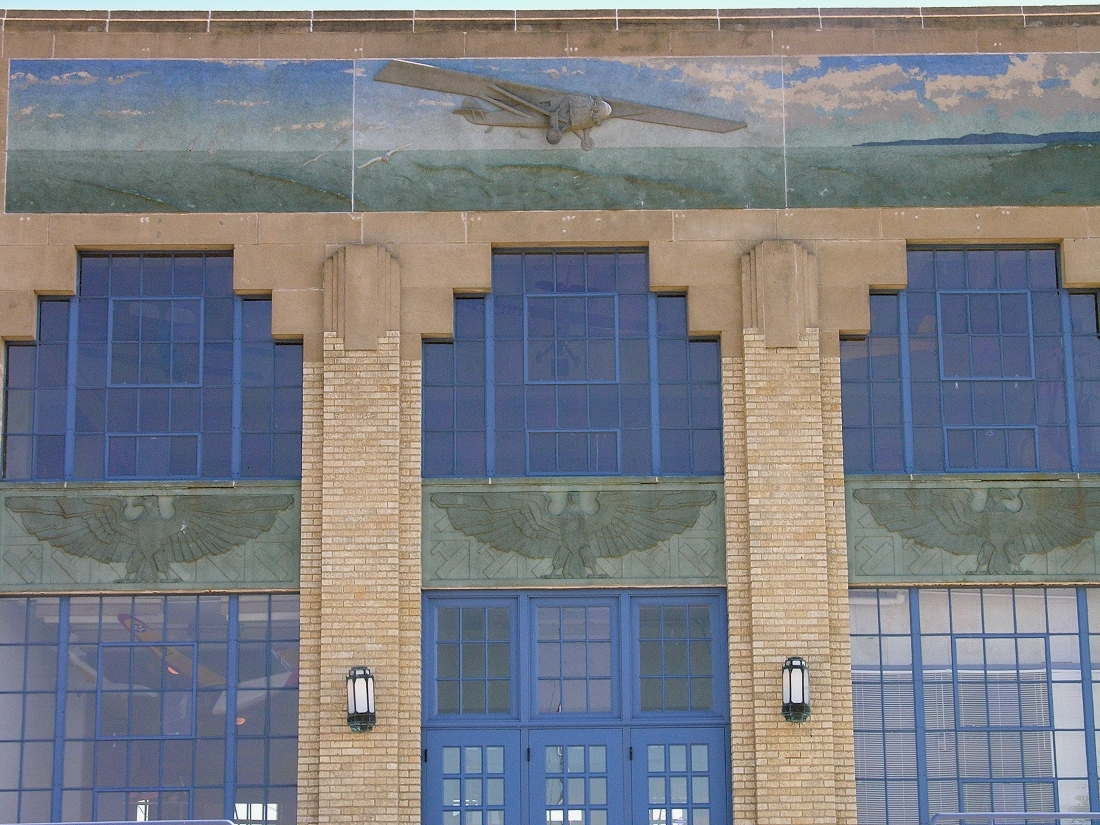
Ramp view

In 1927, the city purchased 640 acres of prairie, the site of airshows dating back to 1924. In June 1930 ceremony, L.W. Clapp broke ground as construction of the administrative building commenced. However, the Great Depression delayed progress until Works Progress Administration funds became available in 1934. On 31 March 1935, the building was dedicated. In 1941, the United States Army Air Corps leased the airport, added the upper control tower, and commenced operations by March 1942. Wings were added to both sides of the terminal as the army's procurement division supervised delivery of Boeing Kaydets and B-29s. By 1944, a take off or landing was occurring every 90 seconds. At the end of WWII, the airport returned to civilian use. In 1951, the airport was acquired by the US Air Force for B-47 use, and renamed Wichita Air Force Base. Civilian use continued until 1954, when the Wichita Mid-Continent Airport opened, and the base was renamed McConnell.

The building was listed on the National Register of Historic Places as the "Administration Building" in 1990. It has also been known as "Building One".

== Exhibits ==
The subjects of exhibits at the museum include women in aviation, African Americans in aviation, aerial photography and aircraft engines. The history of aviation in Wichita is covered by displays about manufacturers that were located in town – Beechcraft, Cessna and Stearman – as well as McConnell Air Force Base. A series of murals originally painted for the main post office in Wichita are located at the museum as well.

The museum is also home to the Kansas Aviation Hall of Fame.

== Collection ==
=== Aircraft ===
The Museum features many display aircraft, most of them made in Kansas, including Boeing jets (WB-47E Stratojet, B-52D Stratofortress, KC-135 Stratotanker, 727 and 737), Republic F-84F Thunderstreak, Lockheed T-33, Beech Starship, Cessna T-37, Learjet 23, Cessna 500/501 Prototype, Stearman 4D "Texaco 11", Stearman Kaydet WWII trainer biplane, 1920 Laird Swallow, 1926 Super Swallow, 1930 Watkins Skylark SL, 1944 Beech Staggerwing, U-8 Seminole, Beech Bonanza, Beech Jet Mentor, Cessna 310, Cessna Skymaster/O-2, Cessna 206, and Mooney Mite. Various other light aircraft, including homebuilt, light-sport and ultralight aircraft are included.

=== Archive ===
The museum's archive contains FAA registration cards from the 1920s through 2004, over 10,000 books and more than 25,000 photographs.

== Programs ==
The museum operates a once yearly "Play on a Plane Day".

== See also ==
- Cosmosphere in Hutchinson
- Combat Air Museum in Topeka
- Mid-America Air Museum in Liberal
- Kansas World War II army airfields
- List of aerospace museums
- List of museums in Kansas
