= Watkins Skylark =

Skylark
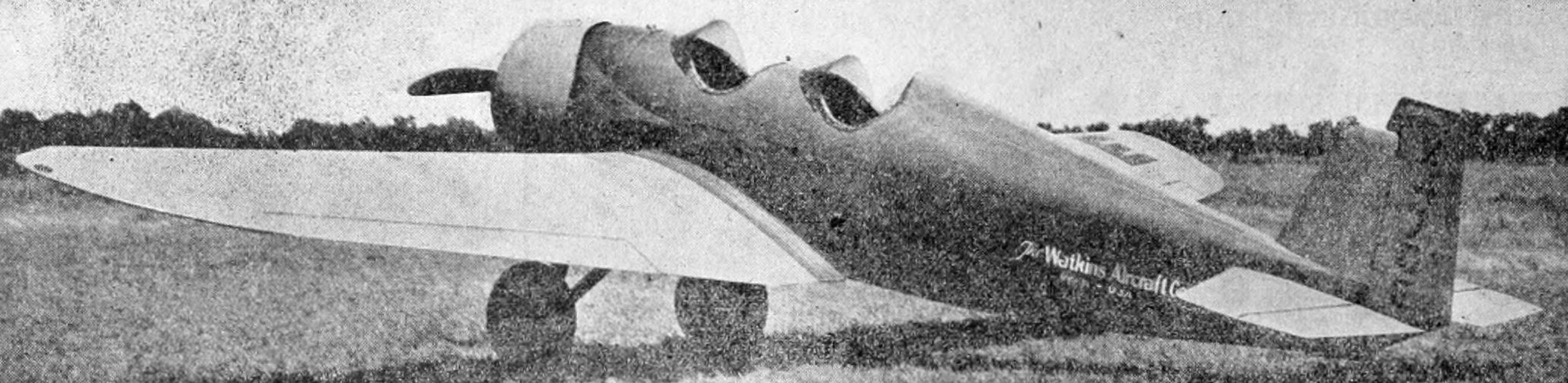
- SL-1 Skylark prototype.

General information
- Type: two seat sports aircraft
- National origin: United States
- Manufacturer: Watkins Aircraft Co.
- Designer: Chester Cummins
- Number built: at least six

History
- First flight: 1929

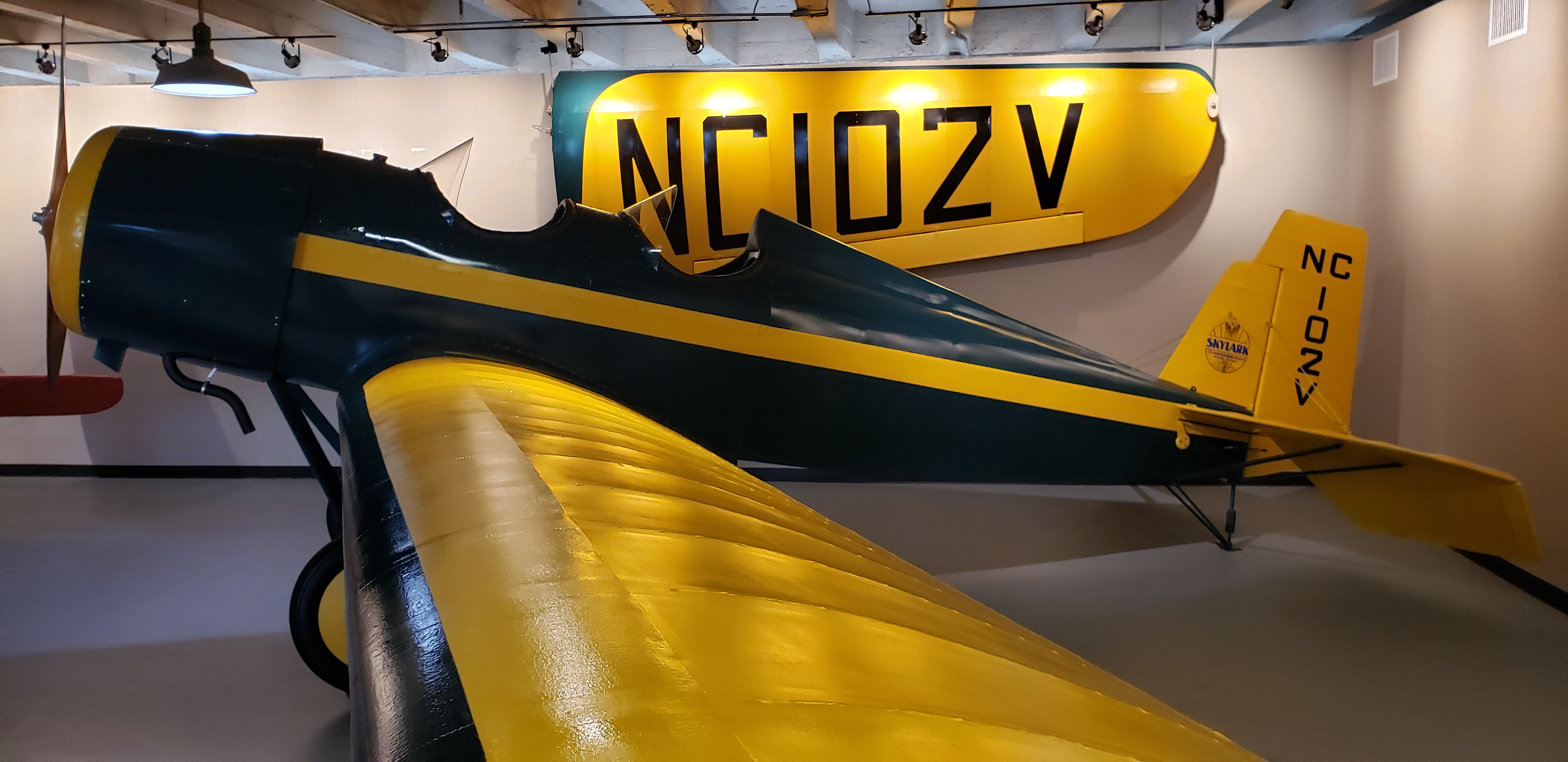
Watkins Skylark on display at the Kansas Aviation Museum

The Watkins Skylark was an American low-wing, cantilever two-seater designed for private and club use. A large anticipated production run in 1930 ended early when the company collapsed in the Great Depression, with only five or six registered.

== Design and development ==
The Skylark, designed by Chester Cummings, was a cantilever, low wing, monoplane with wings tapered in plan out to semi-elliptical tips. They were built around twin box spars and were fabric covered.

The prototype, type SL-1, was powered by a 55 hp (41 kW) Velie M-5 engine but this was replaced in production SL-2s by a 60 hp (45 kW) LeBlond 60-5D. Both were five cylinder radial engines. Behind the engine the fuselage was a steel tube structure with fabric covering, flat-sided but with raised, rounded decking. The Skylark had two open cockpits in tandem, one close to the leading edge and the other over the rear of the wing.

The fuselage tapered rearwards to a conventional, angular tail. Its tailplane and elevators were together trapezoidal in plan. The fin had a cropped triangular profile and carried a rectangular, balanced rudder.

The Skylark had conventional landing gear with its mainwheels on split axles mounted, like the forward drag struts, on the lower fuselage longerons. Its shock absorbing legs were on the forward wing spars near the roots.

== Operational history ==
The prototype Skylark was first flown in 1929, though the date is not known. By October 1929 an agreement had been signed between Watkins Aircraft and Steel Inc., a Los Angeles steel exporter, for the construction of 330 Skylarks with deliveries beginning 1 January 1930. These plans were rapidly abandoned as the depression deepened in 1930 and only five or six were completed.

== Variants ==
SL-1 Skylark
Prototype with 55 hp (41 kW) Velie M-5 five cylinder radial engine. One only.
SL-2 Skylark
Production aircraft, with 60 hp (45 kW) LeBlond 60-5D five cylinder radial engines. At least five built.

== Specifications (SL-2 Skylark ) ==
Data from Aero Digest, November 1929

General characteristics

- Crew: one
- Capacity: one passenger
- Length: 23 ft 6 in (7.16 m)
- Wingspan: 37 ft (11 m)
- Height: 6 ft 5 in (1.96 m)
- Wing area: 175 sq ft (16.3 m^{2})
- Empty weight: 885 lb (401 kg)
- Gross weight: 1,350 lb (612 kg)
- Fuel capacity: 20 US gal (17 imp gal; 76 L)
- Powerplant: 1 × LeBlond 60-5D 5 cylinder radial, 60 hp (45 kW) at 1,900 rpm
- Propellers: 2-bladed

Performance

- Maximum speed: 103 mph (166 km/h, 90 kn)
- Cruise speed: 80 mph (130 km/h, 70 kn)
- Service ceiling: 13,000 ft (4,000 m)
- Rate of climb: 725 ft/min (3.68 m/s)
