= Bellanca 14-7 =

American light aircraft

14-7
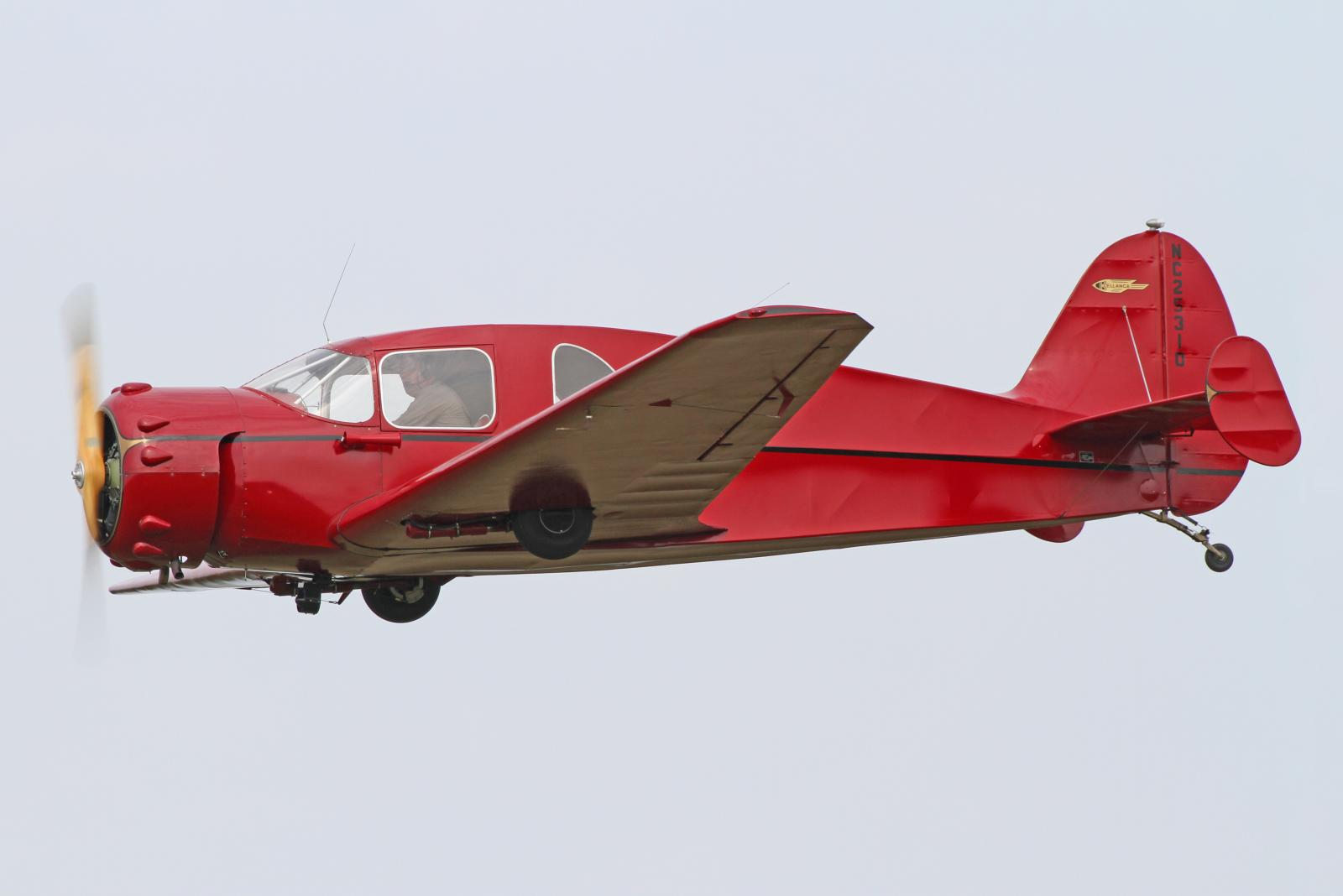
- Model 14-9

General information
- Type: Civil utility aircraft
- Manufacturer: Bellanca
- Designer: Giuseppe Mario Bellanca
- Number built: ca. 59

History
- Introduction date: 1939
- First flight: December 1937
- Variants: Bellanca 14-13

The Bellanca 14-7 Junior and its successors were a family of light aircraft manufactured in the United States by Bellanca Aircraft Corporation shortly before World War II. They were followed post-war by the Bellanca 14-13 and its derivatives.

== Design and development ==
Bellanca had already established itself in the market for aircraft in the 6–8 seat size, but believed that it could also successfully sell smaller (3–4 seats) aircraft. The first example flew in 1937. The 14-7 was a modern, low-wing cantilever monoplane with a fuselage intended to contribute lift to the design. Although the prototype flew with fixed tailwheel undercarriage, the 14-9 production version was the first US light aircraft to be mass-produced with retractable undercarriage; the main wheels rotated aft, up into wells in the wings.

In February 1938 the prototype 14-7 crashed during high speed dive tests, killing Bellanca test pilot Cecil Hoffman (age 32), possibly due to wing flutter. This led to the wing being redesigned from being largely fabric covered to the hallmark Bellanca plywood covered wing. The second prototype, a 14-9 flown by Bellanca test pilot Holger Hoiriis, did not recover well from spins. The addition of the iconic stabilizer end-plates resolved the spin recovery issue. Bert "Fish" Hassell took the 14-9 prototype to the 1938 Chicago air show and the difficulty people had boarding the aircraft resulted in the cabin door upper fuselage cut-out modification.

The 14-7 was initially branded as the Junior. In 1939, when production began, the 14-9 was re-branded as the Cruisair. 1946 onward, the 14-13 was branded as the Cruisair Senior.

== Operational history ==
In 1940, Bellanca Aircraft loaned the National Advisory Committee for Aeronautics (NACA) two 14-9s, purportedly for handling evaluations. One was at NACA in late-June and another in early July, each one staying for 2-3 weeks.

Development culminated in the 1941 14-12-F3, at which point production ceased to allow Bellanca to work as a military subcontractor for the duration of the war when an attempt to market a militarized version as a trainer was unsuccessful. After the war, Bellanca returned to the design to create the Bellanca 14-13 and its successors.

The last 14-12-F3 recorded in the Smithsonian archives is serial number 1059.

== Variants ==
Junior 14-7
Prototype with fixed undercarriage and 70 hp (50 kW) LeBlond 5E radial piston engine. 1 built.
Cruisair 14-9
Main production version with retractable undercarriage and 90hp (67 kW) LeBlond 5F or Ken-Royce 5G radial piston engine. FAA Type Certificate, T.C. No.716, approved 24 August 1939. 40 built.
Cruisair 14-9L
Fitted with a 95 hp (71 kW) Lenape Brave LM-5 radial piston engine. FAA Type Certificate, T.C. No.716, approved 13 December 1940. 3 built.
Cruisair 14-10
Fitted with a 100 hp (75 kW) Lycoming O-235 horizontal piston engine. A Smithsonian photograph shows the 14-10 fitted with a 6 cylinder 150 hp ( 112 kW) Lycoming O-350 horizontal piston engine. 1 built.
Cruisair 14-12
Fitted with a 120 hp (89 kW) Ken-Royce 7F radial piston engine. Delivered to Peru. 1 built.
Cruisair 14-12-F3
Fitted with a 120 hp (89 kW) Franklin 6AC-265-F3 horizontal piston engine. FAA Type Certificate, T.C. No.745, approved 30 October 1941. 13 built.
T14-14
Militarized trainer version. Bellanca documents indicate the T14-14 was to be fitted with a 150 (112 kW) Franklin 6A4-150-B3 horizontal piston engine. The surviving T14-14 is in fact powered by a 130 hp (97 kW) Franklin 6AC-298-F3 horizontal piston engine (single prototype only).

== Specifications (14-9) ==
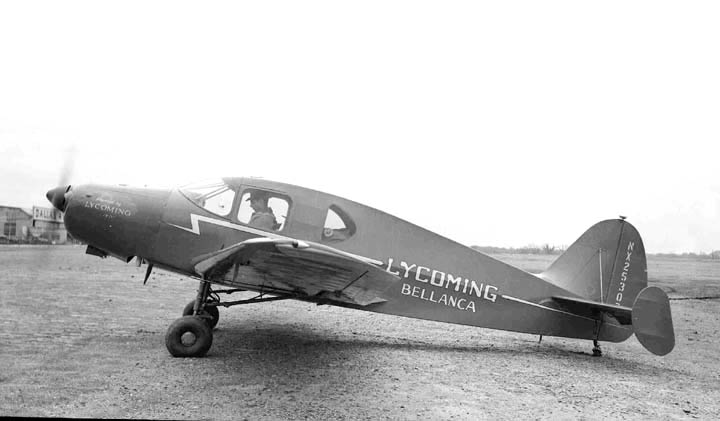
Bellanca 14-10

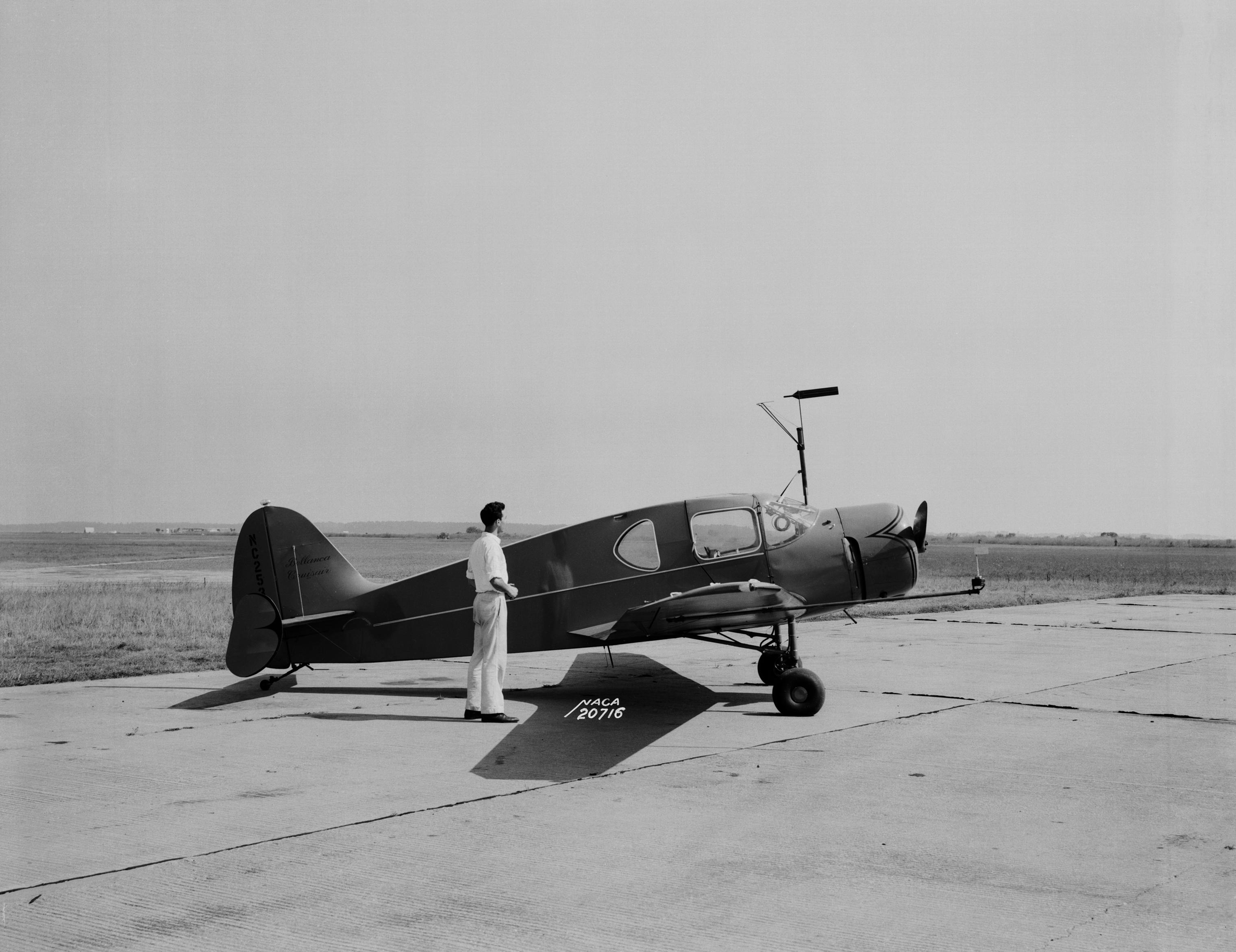
Bellanca 14-9 tested by NACA

Data from Flying Equipment: Bellanca 14-9.

General characteristics

- Crew: 1
- Capacity: 2 passengers
- Length: 21 ft 4 in (6.50 m)
- Wingspan: 34 ft 2 in (10.41 m)
- Height: 6 ft 3 in (1.91 m) (over cabin, tail down)
- Wing area: 140.2 sq ft (13.03 m^{2})
- Empty weight: 975 lb (442 kg)
- Gross weight: 1,700 lb (771 kg) : 1650 lb (748 kg) in 1939, 1750 lb (794 kg) in 1941
- Fuel capacity: 14 to 20 U.S. gallons (53 to 76 L; 12 to 17 imp gal)
- Powerplant: 1 × LeBlond radial engine, 90 hp (67 kW) at 2250 rpm
- Propellers: wood
- Propellers: 6 ft 2 in (1.88 m) diameter

Performance

- Maximum speed: 132 mph (212 km/h, 115 kn) at sea level
- Cruise speed: 120 mph (190 km/h, 100 kn) at 3,000 ft (910 m), 75% power
- Stall speed: 45 mph (72 km/h, 39 kn) : 43 mph (69 km/h, 37 kn) if fitted with flaps
- Range: 420 mi (680 km, 360 nmi)
- Service ceiling: 14,000 ft (4,300 m)
- Rate of climb: 750 ft/min (3.8 m/s)

== See also ==
- Giuseppe Mario Bellanca
