= Warner Aircraft Corporation =

The Warner Aircraft Corporation of Detroit, Michigan was the manufacturer of the Scarab family of radial engines for airplanes in 1928 through the early 1930s.

== History ==
The original name of the company was Aeronautical Industries Incorporated. In October 1927 the company changed its name to the Warner Aircraft Corporation. In November 1927 the first Scarab radial engine was produced. The Scarab Junior was introduced in 1930. In 1933, the company designed and built a much larger radial engine, the Super Scarab. This was to be the last engine the company produced. Warner Aircraft was taken over by the Clinton Machine Company in 1950.

== Engines ==
Year	Name	Model	Military designation	Rating
1927	Scarab		R-420	125 hp
1930	Scarab Junior			90 hp
1933	Super Scarab 165	SS-50	R-500	165 hp
1938	Super Scarab 185	SS-50A	R-550	185 hp
