= LeBlond radial engines =

Radial engine brand

LeBlond radial engines; Ken-Royce engines
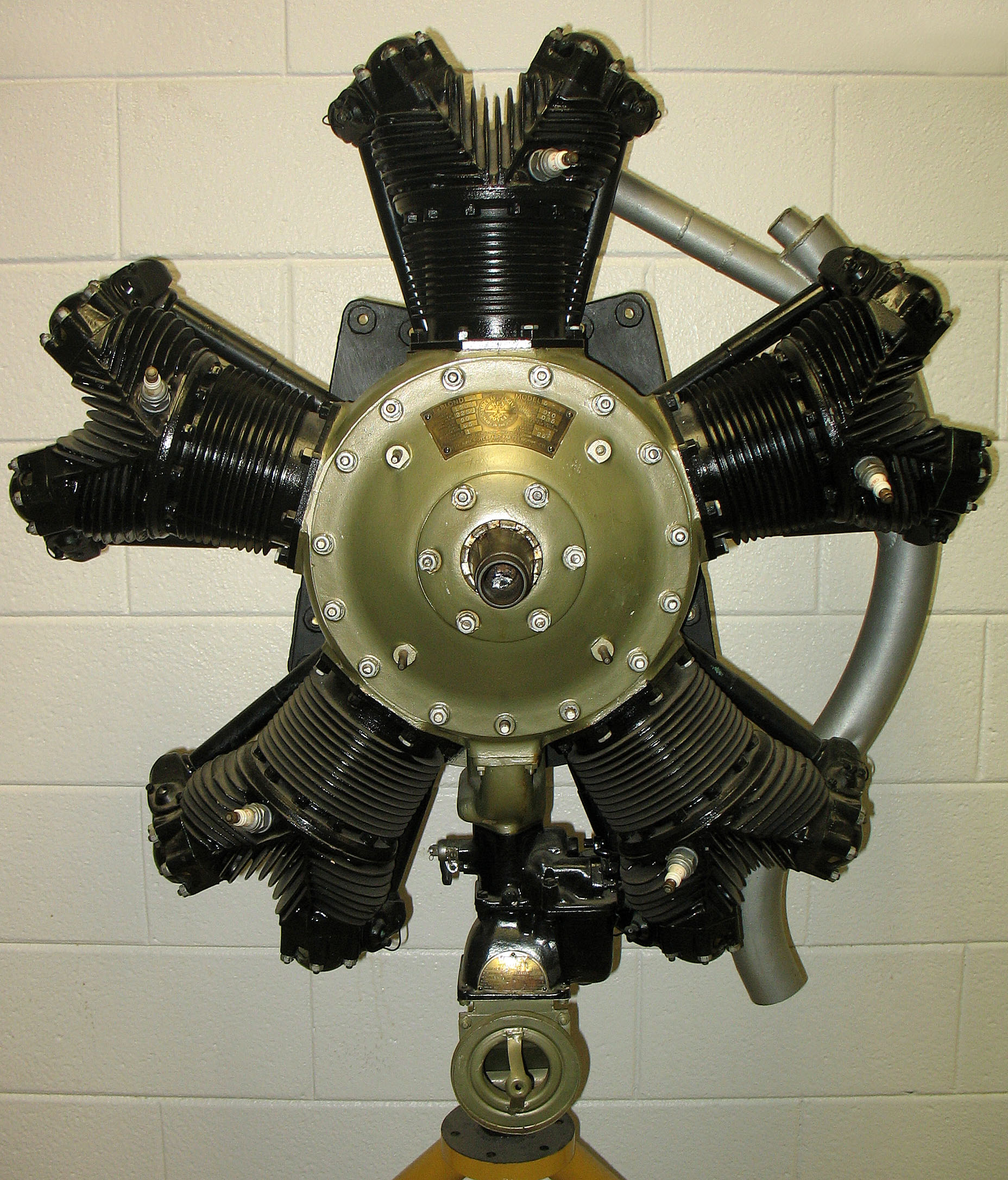
- LeBlond 5-F 90 hp engine
- Type: Radial engine
- Manufacturer: LeBlond Aircraft Engine Corporation; Rearwin Aircraft & Engines

The LeBlond radial engines, later produced under the name Ken-Royce, were a family of 3-cylinder, 5-cylinder and 7-cylinder, air-cooled radial engines for aircraft, built in the 1930s by the LeBlond Aircraft Engine Corporation until the operation was sold to Rearwin Airplanes in 1937 and renamed Ken-Royce Engines.

== Products ==
LeBlond 40-3
3-cylinder air-cooled radial engine.
LeBlond 60-5D
Introduced in 1928, the 60-5D was a 60 hp (45 kw) 5-cylinder, air-cooled, radial piston engine with a displacement of 234 cuin (3.8 L). This model used iron cylinder heads and was a direct development of the Detroit Air-Cat.
LeBlond 70-5DE
Introduced in 1930, the 70-5F was a 70 hp (52 kw) at 1,950 rpm 5-cylinder, air-cooled, radial piston engine, (4.125 x 3.75 = 250.57 cuin (4.11 L)), using iron cylinder heads and two bearings.
LeBlond 85-5DF
Introduced in 1930, the 85-5F was an 85 hp (63 kw) at 1,975 rpm 5-cylinder, air-cooled, radial piston engine, (4.25 x 3.75 = 265.99 (4.36 L)), using aluminum cylinder heads and three bearings.
LeBlond 70-5E
Introduced in 1930, the 70-5E was a 70 hp (52 kw) 5-cylinder, air-cooled, radial piston engine. Production of the 5E continued under Ken-Royce Engines as the Ken-Royce 5E.
LeBlond 80-5F
Introduced in 1930, the 80-5F was an 80 hp (60 kw) 5-cylinder, air-cooled, radial piston engine with a displacement of 266 cubic inches (4.4 litres) Using three bearings as developed for the earlier 5DF series, the LeBlond 5F was introduced in 1930. When aircraft powered with the 5F were commandeered by the U.S. Army, the engine was re-designated the R-265. This engine was the last of the so-called 'greasers'. Production of the 5F continued under Ken-Royce Engines as the Ken-Royce 5G.
LeBlond 85-5DF
Introduced in 1930, the 85-5F was an 85 hp (63 kw) 5-cylinder, air-cooled, radial piston engine with a displacement of 266 cubic inches (4.4 litres)
LeBlond 90-5F
Introduced in 1930, the 90-5F was a 90 hp (68 kw) 5-cylinder, air-cooled, radial piston engine with a displacement of 266 cubic inches (4.4 litres)
LeBlond 90-5G
Introduced in 1930, the 90-5G was a 90 hp (68 kw) 5-cylinder, air-cooled, radial piston engine with a displacement of 266 cubic inches (4.4 litres) Production of the 5G continued under Ken-Royce Engines as the Ken-Royce 5G.
LeBlond 90-7D
90 hp (67.1 kW) at 1,975rpm 4.125 x 3.75 = 350.81 cu in (5.75 L)
LeBlond 110-7DF
110 hp (82.1 kW) at 2,150rpm 4.25 x 3.75 = 372.39 cu in (6.10 L)
LeBlond 120-7
Ken-Royce 7F
Introduced by Ken-Royce Engines in 1939 as a 120hp development of the LeBlond 7DF by increasing the compression ratio and changing the intake and carburetor.

== Applications ==
- Aeronca L
- Arrow Sport
- Ellingston Special
- Rearwin Sportster
- Vulcan American Moth Monoplane
- Niagara Amphibion
- Watkins Skylark

== Specifications ==
Data from Jane's all the World's Aircraft 1928

=== General characteristics ===
- Type: Three, five and seven cylinder radial piston engines
- Bore: 4.125 in (104.8 mm)
- Stroke: 3.75 in (95 mm)
- Displacement:
  - 40-3 150.7 cu in (2.470 L)
  - 60-5 251.2 cu in (4.116 L)
  - 90-7 351.7 cu in (5.763 L)
- Length:
  - 40-3 21.94 in (557 mm)
  - 60-5 21.56 in (548 mm)
  - 90-7 22.25 in (565 mm)
- Diameter: 32.75 in (832 mm) all models
- Dry weight:
  - 40-3 168 lb (76 kg)
  - 60-5 210 lb (95 kg)
  - 90-7 250 lb (110 kg)

=== Components ===
- Valvetrain: Cam-plate driven push-rods with rockers driving one inlet and one exhaust overhead valves per cylinder
- Fuel system: one Zenith carburetor
- Fuel type: Aviation gasolene
- Cooling system: Air-cooled
- 2x Scintilla magnetos

=== Performance ===
- Power output:
  - 40-3 40 hp (30 kW) at 1,900 rpm
  - 60-5 60 hp (45 kW) at 1,800 rpm
  - 90-7 90 hp (67 kW) at 1,850 rpm
- Specific fuel consumption: 0.55 lb/(hp⋅h) (0.33 kg/kWh)

== See also ==
Comparable engines

- Armstrong Siddeley Genet Major
- Warner Scarab

Related lists

- List of aircraft engines
