= Commonwealth Aircraft =

Defunct American aircraft manufacturer

Commonwealth Aircraft Co.
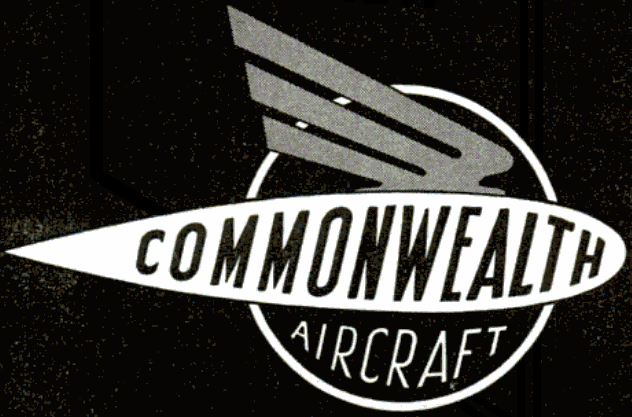
- Company type: Corporation
- Industry: Aerospace
- Predecessor: Rearwin Aircraft & Engines
- Founded: 1942
- Defunct: 1947
- Fate: Bankrupt
- Headquarters: Valley Stream, New York, United States
- Key people: Frank Cohen (chairman); C.H. Dolan (president and general manager)
- Products: Commonwealth Skyranger; Commonwealth Trimmer; Waco CG-3A; Waco CG-4A
- Number of employees: 2,000
- Parent: Empire Ordnance Company

Commonwealth Aircraft Company was an aircraft manufacturer from Valley Stream, New York. Originally Rearwin Aircraft & Engines of Kansas City, the company was renamed in 1942 after it was purchased by a new owner. During World War II, Commonwealth primarily made combat gliders under contract to the Waco Aircraft Company. After World War II, Commonwealth resumed production of the Rearwin-designed Commonwealth Skyranger and consolidated operations in Valley Stream, New York. Commonwealth Aircraft went bankrupt in March 1947 and ceased operations.

== History ==
In early 1942, Rae Rearwin decided to sell Rearwin Aircraft & Engines since it was building small radial engines but horizontally opposed engines were taking over that market share. He was convinced that starting research into horizontally opposed engines would leave the company trying to catch up with competitors, especially since successful horizontally opposed engines were already on the market and being used in the company's own planes. Thus, he wanted to sell the company before its intellectual property and tools became more outdated and less valuable.

As the United States mobilized for World War II, a Wall Street investor named Frank Cohen had acquired several arms manufacturers, so he bought the Rearwin family's stock in Rearwin Aircraft & Engines to diversify his holdings.

The Commonwealth Aircraft Company went on to produce Waco CG-3A and CG-4A gliders under contract during the war. The company built 1,470 of the latter type, which made them the third largest producer of the glider. At least 700 of its 2,000 employees were women. After World War II, Commonwealth Aircraft resumed production of the pre-war Commonwealth Skyranger, but the original jigs and tooling had been recycled for scrap so the first 12 planes had to be hand built. After acquiring the Columbia Aircraft Corporation of Valley Stream, New York, in 1946, it was decided to move production to the former Columbia Aircraft properties.

Commonwealth Aircraft went bankrupt in 1946 and was dissolved in March 1947. Very few of the Kansas City employees had moved to New York, forcing the company to hire new employees, and there had been a labor strike in October 1946. The Skyranger design hadn't been significantly updated from its pre-war origins, and it was forced to compete with both newer designs and cheap war surplus aircraft while the expected post-war sales boom for aircraft didn't live up to expectations.

== Aircraft ==
Model name	First flight	Number built	Type
Commonwealth Skyranger 175			Single engine cabin monoplane
Commonwealth Skyranger 185			Single engine cabin monoplane
Commonwealth Trimmer		1 or 2	Twin engine amphibious airplane
Commonwealth CG-3A		100	Assault glider
Commonwealth CG-4A		1,470	Assault glider
