= Makino =

Company

Makino Milling Machine Co., Ltd.
- Native name: 株式会社牧野フライス製作所
- Type: Public KK
- Traded as: TYO: 6135
- Industry: Machinery
- Founded: (May 1937; 89 years ago)
- Headquarters: Tokyo, Japan
- Area served: Worldwide
- Key people: Shotaro Miyazaki (President and CEO)
- Products: Horizontal Machining Centers (HMC); Vertical Machining Centers (VMC); 5-axis machines; Graphite machines; EDM machines (wire and ram types); Automated pallet systems; Grinding machines
- Revenue: ▲JPY 181.5 billion (FY 2018) (US$ 1.65 billion) (FY 2018)
- Net income: ▲JPY 11.4 billion (FY 2014) (US$ 95 million) (FY 2014)
- Number of employees: 4,731 (3.2018)
- Website: Official website

Makino Milling Machine Co., Ltd. (株式会社牧野フライス製作所, Kabushiki-gaisha Makino Furaisu Seisakusho), commonly known as Makino, is a machine tool builder with global sales and service, headquartered in Japan.

== History ==
Makino was established in 1937 by Tsunezo Makino in Japan, developing Japan's first numerically controlled (NC) milling machine in 1958 and Japan's first machining centre in 1966.

The North American branch of Makino was formed through the 1981 merger of the R. K. LeBlond Machine Tool Company of Cincinnati and the Makino Milling Machine Company of Japan. Resulting from the merger was the formation of what was then called "LeBlond Makino Machine Tool Company".

In 1996, LeBlond Makino became Makino, and in 1997 LeBlond Lathe Ltd. was formed as a parts and servicing subsidiary.

== Innovations ==
In 1984, Makino introduced the first commercial high-speed spindle for milling. In 1990, Makino introduced Geometric Intelligence, the first servo-control software tailored to high-speed machining, and Flush Fine machining, a method for cutting hardened materials.

The company developed the first drop-tank wire EDM in 1994, and HQSF (High-Quality Surface Finish) technology with patented uSc additive in 1996, increasing the ability to finish parts without hand polishing when using a ram EDM. In 2003, Makino developed the first conventional horizontal wire EDM that automatically threads and machines with a 0.02mm diameter wire.

In 2006, the company developed High Energy Applied Technology (HEAT) for wire EDMs to increase speed in wire EDMing, and released the EDAC1 micro EDM ram machine. Makino is also the only manufacturer of a horizontal wire EDM, the UPJ-2. In 2007, Makino introduced SurfaceWIZARD wire EDM technology, designed to eliminate witness lines in stepped parts. Makino created ADVANTiGE™ Technology for the machining of titanium in 2010, which was recognized as a winner of Aviation Week's 2012 Innovation Challenge.
