= Rearwin Sportster =

American two-seat, high-winged, cabin monoplane

Sportster
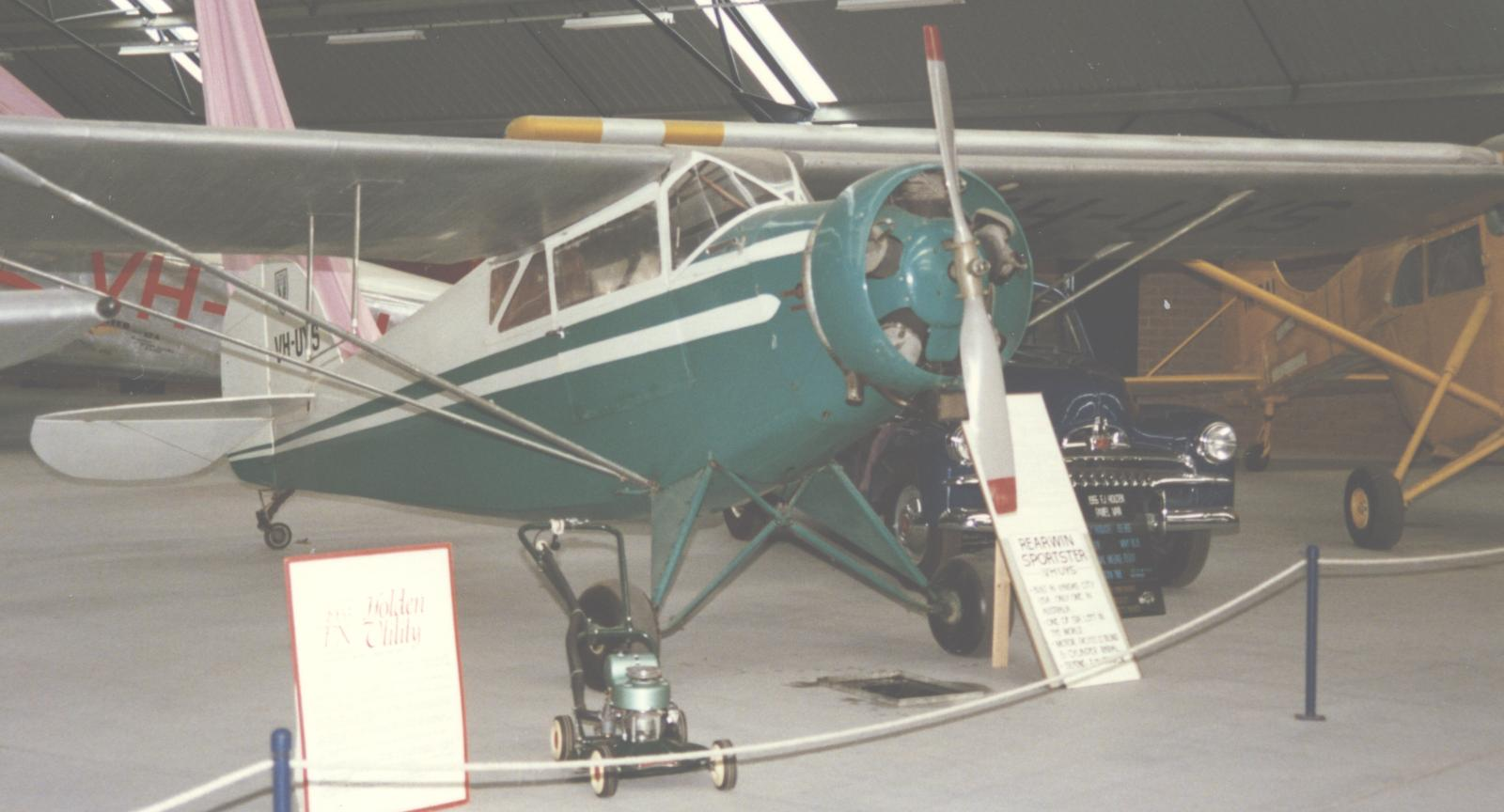
- Rearwin Sportster 9000 displayed in the Drage Airworld museum at Wangaratta, Victoria, Australia in March 1988

General information
- Type: Sporting/Touring monoplane
- National origin: United States
- Manufacturer: Rearwin Aircraft & Engines
- Designer: Henry Weeks
- Number built: ca 273

History
- First flight: 1935

The Rearwin Sportster is a 1930s American two-seat, high-winged, cabin monoplane designed and built by Rearwin Aircraft & Engines for sport/touring use.

== Development ==
The Sportster began development while Rearwin was still certifying the previous model: the Rearwin Speedster. The Speedster had been designed for performance, so the company focused on another, more basic, model to provide reliable income. This model was to become the Sportster, with design work beginning in 1934.

As the Rearwin company was occupied trying to certify the Speedster, initial work was contracted out to Henry Weeks of Stevenson-Weeks Air Service. The resulting design first flew on April 30, 1935.

The design of the Rearwin Speedster bore a coincidental resemblance to the competing Porterfield Flyabout. The Flyabout had started as the Wyandotte Pup, designed by engineer Noel Hockaday and built by students at Wyandotte High School. Ed Porterfield had seen the finished design, bought the rights to it, started the Porterfield company to build it, and hired Hockaday to develop the plane into the Flyabout. Hockaday had previously assisted engineer Douglas Webber at American Eagle Aircraft Corporation, both of whom later moved to Rearwin Aircraft. Their influence at Rearwin resulted in design elements that were used in the Sportster, thus resembling the Hockaday-designed Flyabout.

In 1936, the Sportster was certified to take pontoons at the request of George B. Cluett. This required enlarging the vertical tail after the test aircraft nearly failed to recover from a flat spin. The final modifications to the Sportster occurred in 1939 to reinvigorate sales. The demands of World War II forced production of the Sportster to cease in 1941.

== Design ==
The Sportster was a two-seat braced high-wing cabin monoplane. The pilot and passenger were seated in tandem. Both seats had flight controls, but only the pilot had an instrument panel.

The conventional landing gear used a fixed tail-skid instead of tailwheel and came without brakes at first, although a tailwheel and brakes were later offered as options. Skis and pontoons were also available options, although the Sportster's vertical tail had to be enlarged to maintain its spin certification in case pontoons were fitted. A Deluxe model included wheel pants, navigation lights, radio, and optional skylights; later modifications to the design included a one-piece windshield.

Initial versions of the Sportster were powered by a 5-cylinder LeBlond radial engine of 70-85 hp. The third model of the Sportster offered either the Warner Scarab or LeBlond radial engine (renamed as a Ken-Royce engine when Rearwin bought that company). Both produced 90 hp. Initially the engine was left uncovered but Townend rings and a propeller spinner were an option on the Deluxe model; a 1939 redesign introduced the streamlined NACA cowling. Range was about 500 miles for all versions.

== Variants ==
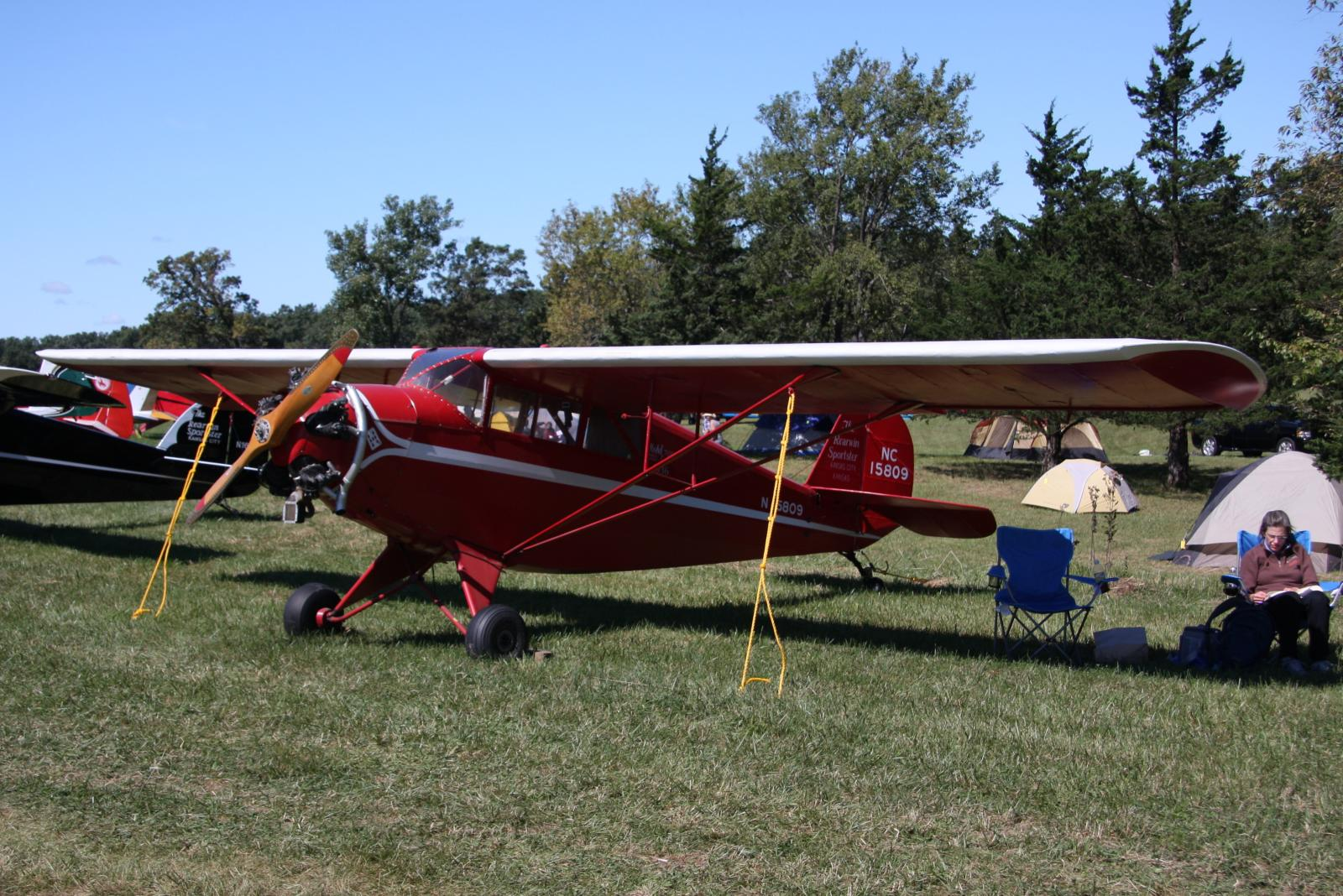
1936 Rearwin 7000

All Deluxe models were updated in 1939 to offer NACA cowling, one-piece windshield, and improved cooling.

Rearwin Sportster 7000
Initial production variant of 1935-1936 powered by either a 70hp (52kW) LeBlond 5DE or LeBlond 5E radial engine, 75 built. A Deluxe model was offered beginning in 1936 with optional Townend ring, propeller spinner, wheel pants, navigation lights, and radio.
Rearwin Sportster 8500
Variant with an 85hp (63kW) LeBlond 5DF introduced in 1935. The plane's gross weight decreased by 85lbs. A Deluxe model was offered beginning in 1936 with optional Townend ring, propeller spinner, wheel pants, navigation lights, and radio.
Rearwin Sportster 9000/Rearwin Sportster 9000-W
Introduced in 1937 powered by a 90hp Warner Scarab engine. A Deluxe model was offered with optional Townend ring, propeller spinner, wheel pants, navigation lights, and radio.
Rearwin Sportster 9000-L/Rearwin Sportster 9000-KR
Introduced in 1937 powered by a 90hp LeBlond 5DF (renamed Ken-Royce 5DF after the LeBlond Aircraft Engine Corporation was sold to Rearwin Airplanes). A Deluxe model was offered with optional Townend ring, propeller spinner, wheel pants, navigation lights, and radio.
Rearwin Sportster 9000-KRT
Sportster 9000-KR modified by Rearwin into an instrument trainer.
Götaverken GV-38
Designation for the 14 Sportster 9000-L built by the Swedish A. B. Götaverken Shipbuilding Company between 1938 and 1943. Powered by either Warner or Ken-Royce engines, one (SE-AHG) was later fitted with a horizontally-opposed Continental O-190.
UC-102
Designation of two Sportster 9000s impressed into military service during World War II.
B.S.2
(Thai: บ.ส.๒) Royal Thai Armed Forces designation for the Sportster 9000-KRT.

== Operators ==
=== Military operators ===
Honduras

- Honduran Air Force Operated two Sportsters and a Ken-Royce biplane as trainers.

New Zealand

- Royal New Zealand Air Force Two impressed during World War II.

South Africa

- South African Air Force Two were impressed during World War II.

United States

- United States Army Air Forces Two Model 9000W were impressed as UC-102 during World War II.
- Civil Air Patrol At least 8 Sportsters, with 4 in the Michigan Wing, during World War II.

=== Civil operators ===
United States

- The government of Puerto Rico used one 1937 Sportster in the Insular Forest Service.
- The U.S. Department of Agriculture Bureau of Entomology and Plant Quarantine used two Sportsters with 90 hp engines for insect control.
- The United States Fish and Wildlife Service used one 1937 Sportster for surveys related to the Migratory Bird Treaty Act of 1918.

== Aircraft on display ==
Numerous models of the Sportster survive in museums. Ken Rearwin purchased the prototype Sportster and donated it to the Airpower Museum in Blakesburg, Iowa.

== Specifications (8500) ==
Data from

General characteristics

- Crew: 2
- Length: 22 ft 3 in (6.78 m)
- Wingspan: 35 ft 0 in (10.67 m)
- Height: 6 ft 9 in (2.06 m)
- Wing area: 166 sq ft (15.42 m^{2})
- Empty weight: 830 lb (376 kg)
- Gross weight: 1,410 lb (640 kg)
- Powerplant: 1 × LeBlond 5DF radial engine , 85 hp (63 kW)

Performance

- Maximum speed: 116 mph (187 km/h, 101 kn)
- Range: 480 mi (772 km, 420 nmi)
- Service ceiling: 15,200 ft (4,635 m)
