= R. K. LeBlond Machine Tool Company =

- Founded: 1887, Cincinnati, Ohio
- Defunct: 2002

In 1887, Richard Knight LeBlond founded the R. K. LeBlond Machine Tool Company in Cincinnati, Ohio to manufacture metal cutting lathes. The LeBlond Aircraft Engine Corporation was formed as a subsidiary in 1928. As a result of a joint venture with Makino Milling Machine, LeBlond Makino Machine Tool Company was formed in 1981. In 1996, LeBlond Makino Machine Tool Company changed its name to Makino. Then in 1997, LeBlond Lathe Parts was founded to focus on the service and support of all LeBlond lathe equipment manufactured since 1887. In 1998, after acquiring the W. F. & John Barnes Company, the company's name was changed to LeBlond Ltd to reflect a broader business purpose. LeBlond continued its acquisition strategy by acquiring the Standard Modern lathe service parts business in 1999. The Johnson Press and Deka Drill service parts businesses were acquired from South Bend Lathe in 2001 and the South Bend Lathe and Dynablast parts businesses in March, 2002. LeBlond's product support team had collectively 160 years of service with LeBlond Machine Tool Company, LeBlond Makino and Makino.

== Welfare of Workforce ==
In 1920, LeBlond was an industry leader in the health and welfare of its employees with professional health care and family support services.
