= Rearwin Junior =

- Rearwin Junior sideview

General information
- Type: Sport aircraft
- National origin: United States
- Manufacturer: Rearwin Airplanes
- Designer: Douglas Webber
- Number built: ca 30

History
- First flight: 1931

The Rearwin Junior was a 1930s two-seat high-winged ultra-light monoplane sport aircraft produced in the United States by Rearwin Airplanes Inc. It was part of a trend of extremely low-cost aircraft as manufacturers attempted to survive the Great Depression.

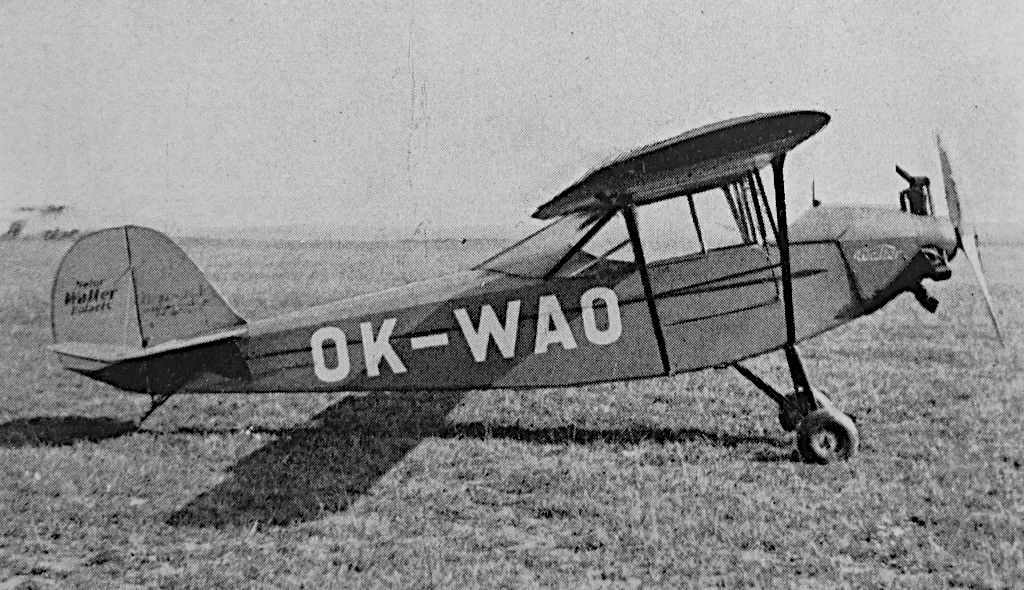
Rearwin Junior 4000 (OK-WAO) and Walter Polaris II

== Development ==
The Aeronca C-2 had successfully debuted in 1930 as a low-cost two-seat ultra-light sportplane, setting a trend for aircraft manufacturers trying to survive the Great Depression. Douglas Webber and Noel Hockaday at the American Eagle Aircraft Corporation, based at the Fairfax Airport near Rearwin, had followed with the similarly-targeted American Eagle Eaglet. Douglas Webber eventually left American Eagle and started advertising a complete design of another similar aircraft and his services as an engineer—Rearwin bought the design, hired Webber and Hockaday, and completed the prototype in 6 months. The first flight was in April 1931.

The Junior was tested with an experimental engine by Guy Poyer (a business acquaintance of the company's main investor) built in the Rearwin factory, but that project failed. An alternative engine was also certified.

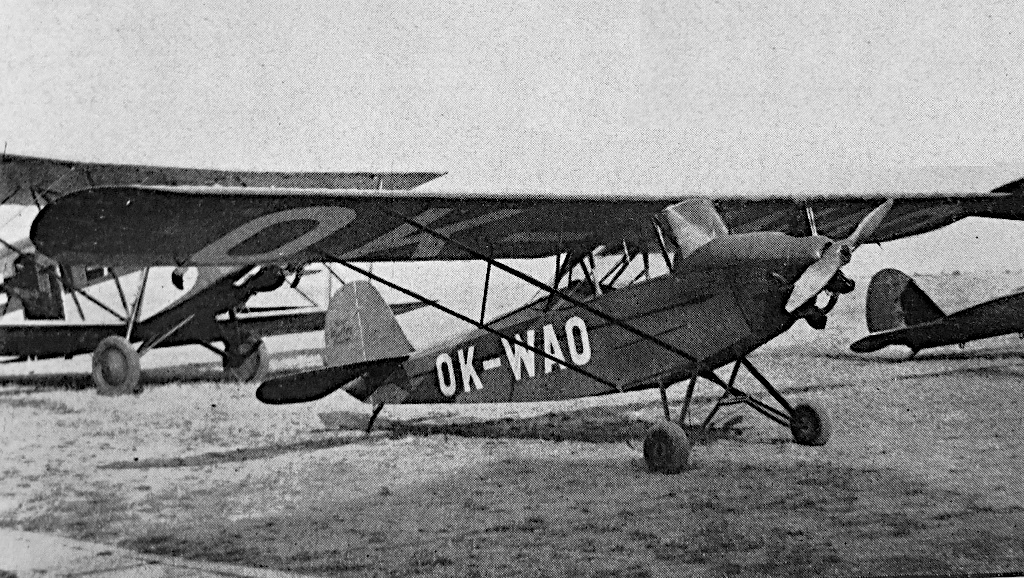
Rearwin Junior 4000 (OK-WAO) and Walter Polaris II

== Design ==
The Junior was a conventional, high-wing monoplane with two seats in tandem in an open cockpit and fixed, tailskid undercarriage. An optional enclosed canopy was also available. The wings were of wooden construction while the fuselage and empennage were built from welded steel tube, with the whole aircraft skinned in fabric.

While the Junior resembled Webber and Hockaday's preceding Eaglet, it was longer, wider, and had wider landing gear. It was heavier than the Eaglet but also more capable.

== Operational history ==
Although the Rearwin Junior was designed to meet the lowest possible sale price, the onset of the Great Depression severely limited the size of the market for sport aircraft, and only a small number were built.

== Variants ==
- Junior 3000 - version with Szekely SR-3 engine (approximately 20 built)
  - Junior 3001 - version with Poyer engine (one built, later converted to the Junior 4000 standard)
  - Junior 3100 - version with Szekely SR-5 engine (Two built)
- Junior 4000 - version with Aeromarine AR-3 engine (eight built)

== Surviving aircraft ==
The Junior prototype survived in the private collection of Oscar Cooke until it was auctioned in 1998.

== Specifications (3000) ==
Data from

General characteristics

- Crew: One pilot
- Capacity: 1 passenger
- Length: 21 ft 11 in (6.68 m)
- Wingspan: 36 ft 0 in (10.97 m)
- Height: 7 ft 6 in (2.29 m)
- Wing area: 180 sq ft (16.7 m^{2})
- Empty weight: 570 lb (260 kg)
- Gross weight: 1,000 lb (450 kg)
- Powerplant: 1 × Szekely SR-3 , 45 hp (30 kW)

Performance

- Maximum speed: 91 mph (146 km/h, 79 kn)
- Cruise speed: 76 mph (122 km/h, 66 kn)
- Range: 240 mi (386 km, 210 nmi)
- Service ceiling: 16,000 ft (4,876 m)
- Rate of climb: 700 ft/min (213 m/s)

== See also ==
Aircraft of comparable role, configuration, and era

- Aeronca C-2
- American Eagle Eaglet
- Curtiss-Wright Junior
- Spartan C2
