= Rearwin Airplanes =

Series of US airplane-manufacturing businesses

Rearwin Aircraft and Engines Inc.
- Formerly: Rearwin Airplanes Inc.; Rearwin Aircraft Inc.
- Industry: Aerospace
- Founded: 1928
- Defunct: 1942
- Fate: Sold
- Successor: Commonwealth Aircraft
- Headquarters: Salina, Kansas; Kansas City, Kansas, United States
- Key people: R.A. Rearwin; Royce Rearwin; Ken Rearwin
- Subsidiaries: Ken-Royce Engines

Rearwin Airplanes was a series of US airplane-manufacturing businesses founded by Andrew ("Rae") Rearwin in 1928. Rae Rearwin was an American businessman who had developed several successful business ventures in the Salina, Kansas area in the early 20th century. Although he had no experience with aircraft manufacturing (and no pilot training), he felt that he could succeed with his solid business acumen. With his two sons, Ken and Royce, he hired some engineers and built the Ken-Royce in a garage in Salina. The business moved to the Fairfax Airport in Kansas City, Kansas, and went through several variations before it was sold to Commonwealth Aircraft in 1942, which went bankrupt in 1946.

== History ==
Rae Rearwin had toured Wichita aircraft manufacturers in the summer of 1927 with his teenage sons Royce and Ken and became convinced he could improve on what he saw. He investigated buying an existing firm, but none were interested in selling, so he tried to hire Herb Rawdon away from the Travel Air Corporation. Rawdon was not interested but suggested an engineer who might be.

The company started construction in an old garage in Salina, Kansas, the Rearwin's hometown. The company's first prototype, the Rearwin Ken-Royce was finished in January 1929. Rearwin moved the operation to the Fairfax Airport in Kansas City, Kansas, in early 1929. While the Ken-Royce prototype engaged in publicity tours and races, Rae Rearwin sought an investor to fund operations. A Kansas City oilman provided funds and Rae formed a joint venture with him, naming the company Rearwin Airplanes.

Rearwin Airplanes would produce both the Ken-Royce and the Rearwin Junior, although the Great Depression ultimately caused orders for both to dry up. In 1933, Rae started a new sole proprietorship using the idle Rearwin Airplanes factory and equipment, which was named Rearwin Aircraft. Rearwin Aircraft focused on producing the high performance Rearwin Speedster and the lower-cost Rearwin Sportster. The company became Rearwin Aircraft & Engines upon acquiring LeBlond Aircraft Engine Corporation, a maker of small radial engines which Rearwin used in several of their products. The division was renamed Ken-Royce Engines Company.

Rearwin Aircraft & Engines introduced their Cloudster in 1939, which was further developed into a specialized instrument trainer for airlines. To stay current, Rearwin's last product, the Skyranger adopted the new horizontally-opposed engine instead of the small radial engines the company produced and was experienced with.

The company was sold to investor Frank Cohen's Empire Ordnance company in 1942 and became Commonwealth Aircraft, which would acquire Columbia Aircraft Corporation and move to their former plant in Valley Stream, New York. While Ken and Royce had always been involved in the Rearwin company, they were not interested in taking over the business. Rearwin Aircraft & Engines' investments and specialty in small radial engines left them poorly positioned for the coming age of horizontally opposed engines that would dominate after World War II.

Before selling the company, the Rearwins had negotiated contracts to make Waco CG-3A and CG-4A. This required physical expansions, and 2000 employees would eventually be hired. Other war contracts included dies and punches for Remington Arms and glider tow releases. By the end of World War II, 1,470 of the CG-4A gliders had been built, making Rearwin/Commonwealth the third-largest manufacturer of the type.

Commonwealth Aircraft resumed production of the Skyranger in 1945 at the Fairfax plant, before moving production to New York. The company went bankrupt in 1946 and was dissolved by March 1947.

== Products ==
=== Rearwin Aircraft ===
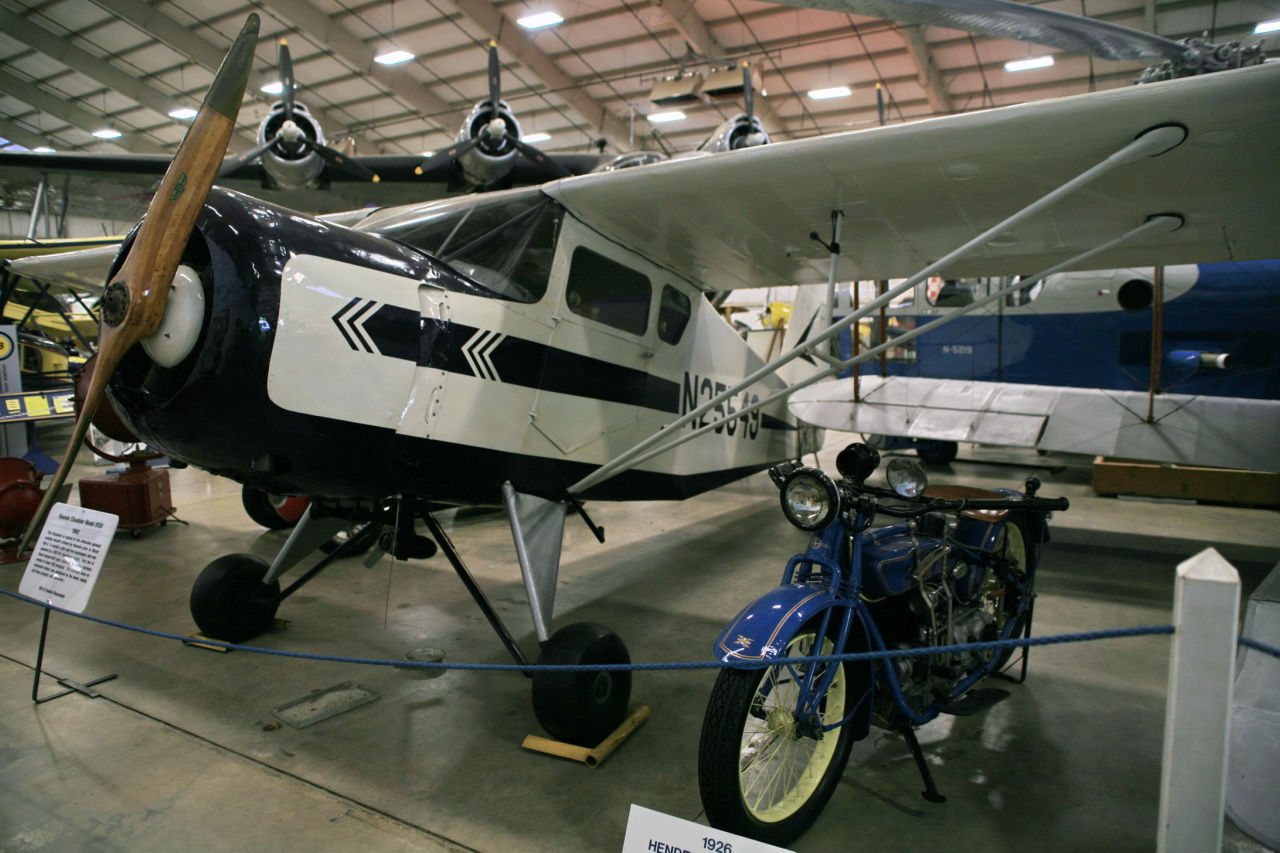
Rearwin 8135 Cloudster

Model name	First flight	Number built	Type
Rearwin Ken-Royce	1929	7	Single engine sport biplane
Rearwin Junior	1931	~30	Single engine sport monoplane
Rearwin Speedster	1934	11	Single engine sport monoplane
Rearwin Sportster	1935	~273	Single engine sport monoplane
Rearwin Cloudster	1939	125	Single engine utility monoplane
Rearwin Skyranger	1940	82	Single engine utility monoplane

=== Ken-Royce Engine Company ===
Rearwin's aircraft mainly used small radial engines, so in 1937 when the R. K. LeBlond Machine Tool Company offered to sell their engine division, which specialized in small radial engines, Rearwin bought the assets. The sale was made at a steeply discounted price, to give the LeBlond company a tax write-off, and gave Rearwin an in-house source of small radial engines for their aircraft.
