= Rearwin Ken-Royce =

American three-seat sport/touring biplane

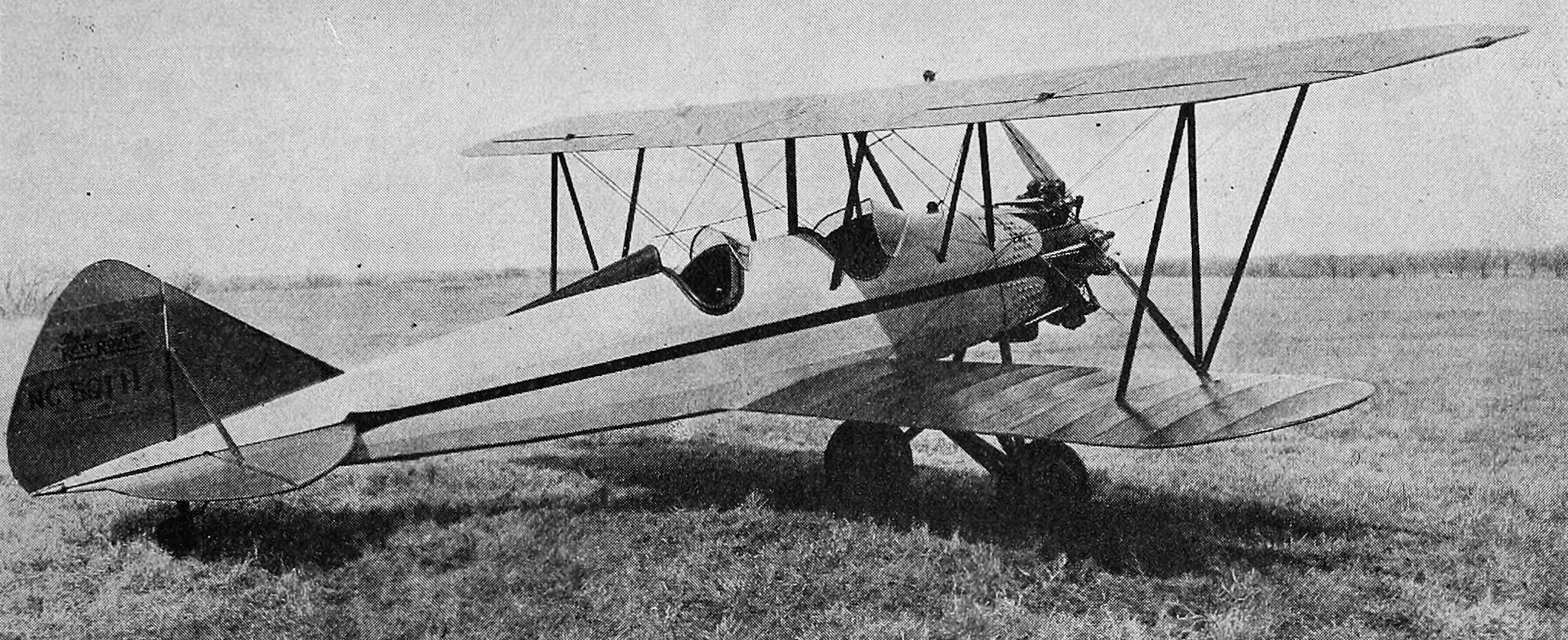
- Rearwin Ken-Royce in Aero Digest April 1929

General information
- Type: General aviation
- National origin: United States
- Manufacturer: Rearwin Airplanes
- Designer: Fred Landgraf
- Number built: 7

History
- Manufactured: 1929-1937
- First flight: January 1929

The Rearwin Ken-Royce was an American three-seat sport/touring biplane built by Rearwin Airplanes first in Salina, Kansas then Kansas City. It was the first airplane built by the company.

== Design and development ==
Rae Rearwin had toured Wichita aircraft manufacturers in the summer of 1927 and resolved to start an aircraft manufacturing business. After failing to hire Herb Rawdon away from Travel Air Corporation, he hired a young engineer Rawdon had suggested. Work on the company's first airplane began in an old garage in Salina, Kansas. The airplane, the Ken-Royce, was completed in January 1929. The name was both homage to Rae Rearwin's two sons, and a play on the name Rolls-Royce, implying a quality product.

The first aircraft was finished before a factory or financial backing had been set up. After both were found, further Ken-Royces were built in Kansas City.

The Ken-Royce was a three-seat sport/touring biplane with pilot and passengers seated in tandem. Dual controls were optional, as was the choice of tail skid or tailwheel for the landing gear. Early Ken-Royce's were built with 180 hp (130 kW) Curtiss Challenger engines, while Continental Motors' first engine, the 170 hp (130 kW) A-70 was substituted after 1930. Production continued until 1937.

== Operational history ==
The prototype Ken-Royce participated in The All-Kansas Air Tour in 1929, an event with both scored events and timed races. The Tour Chairman characterized the Ken-Royce's performance as "unsurpassed." The plane was immediately entered in further races in Memphis and Tulsa.

Ruth Nichols then used the prototype in the Women's Air Derby in 1929. She was forced down outside Wichita because she was unfamiliar with the plane and had emptied the wing fuel tank: but did not realize there was a fuselage tank as well. She was again forced down west of Phoenix when the engine seized. She had to hike for several miles before eventually encountering a car which carried her to a railroad station. She rode to Los Angeles where she recruited a crew to fly another Curtiss Challenger engine out to the desert on a Ford Trimotor to replace the ruined engine. The repair was completed and Nichols flew the Ken-Royce to the starting line 30 minutes before the race started. Nichols and the Ken-Royce advanced to second-place by the time the race reached Columbus. However, on a test flight after adjusting the propeller pitch, the Ken-Royce crashed. It was shipped back to Rearwin by rail.

Ken-Royces were entered in the National Air Races in 1929 and 1930, the Miami Air Races, the Detroit Air Show, and the Pikes Peak Air Meet. One Ken-Royce participated in the Ford National Reliability Air Tour, but took 11th in a field of 18.

The third Ken-Royce biplane was sold to the Dallas School of Aviation, and was delivered by an aviator working for the American Eagle company named Jean LaRene. A flight instructor and rated transport pilot, she flew the Ken-Royce in the 1931 and 1932 Women's Air Derby. In 1940, she purchased the plane back from a private owner. Today it is the only Ken-Royce to survive.

== Variants ==
Data from RearwinAirplanes.com

Rearwin 2000/Rearwin 2000-C
The initial version of the Ken-Royce, introduced in 1929. Used the 180 hp (130 kW) Curtiss Challenger engine. One prototype and three production built.
Rearwin 2000-CO
Version of the Ken-Royce using the 170 hp (130 kW) Continental A-70 engine. One prototype and two production aircraft built.

== Operators ==
- Honduras

Honduran Air Force - Ordered one Ken-Royce in 1937.

== Surviving Aircraft ==
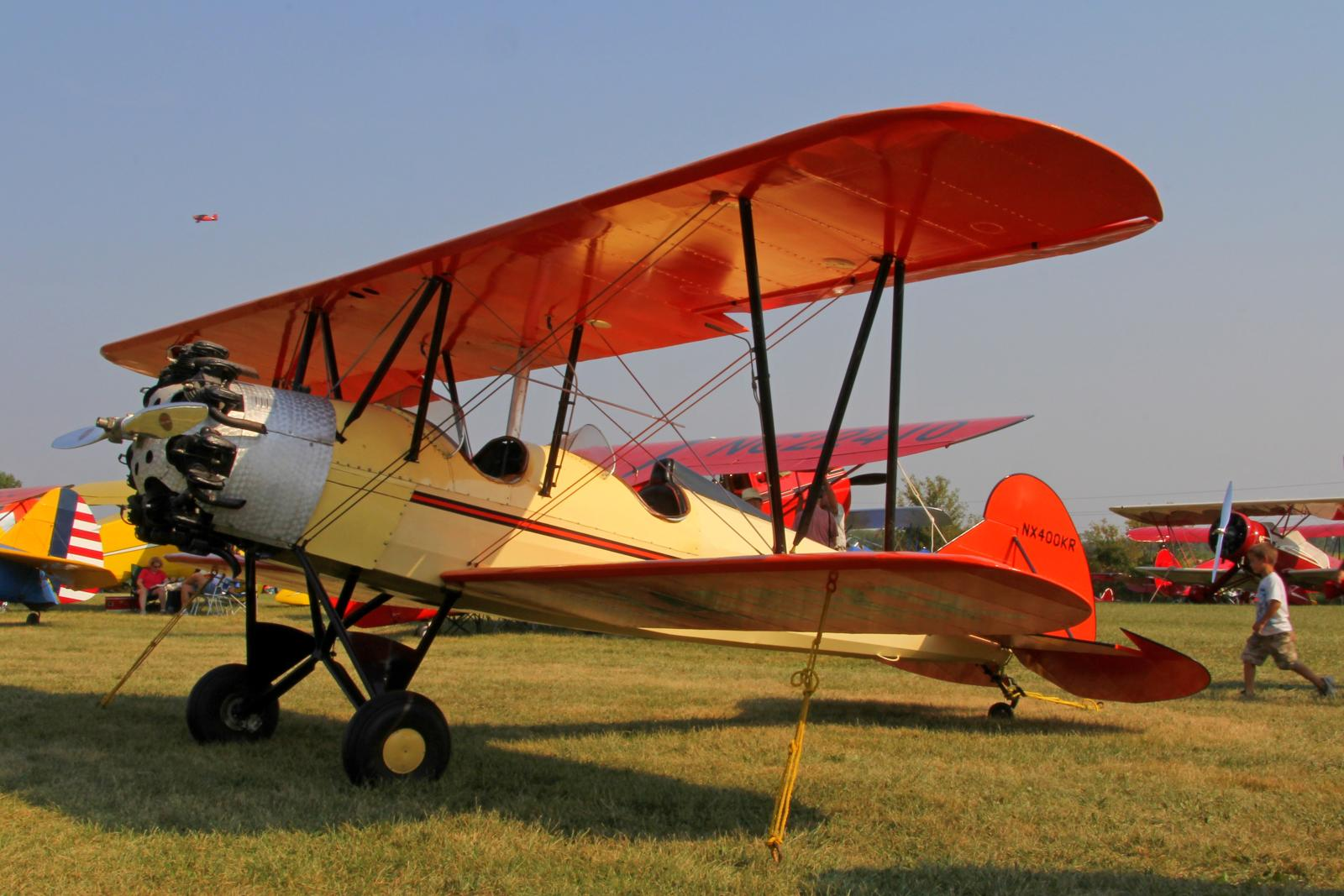
4/5th scale replica of the Ken-Royce (N400KR)

- 1 Ken-Royce 2000-C is known to survive. It is owned by the Pioneer Flight Museum, Kingsbury, Texas, and is under restoration.
- 1 replica, 4/5th scale, was built by Cleo Robinson in Phillipsburg, Kansas and is registered N400KR.

== Specifications (Rearwin 2000-C) ==
Data from

General characteristics

- Crew: one
- Capacity: two
- Length: 25 ft (7.6 m)
- Wingspan: 35 ft 0 in (10.67 m)
- Height: 9 ft 11 in (3.02 m)
- Wing area: 300 sq ft (28 m^{2})
- Airfoil: Rhode-St. Genese
- Empty weight: 1,415 lb (642 kg)
- Gross weight: 2,300 lb (1,043 kg)
- Fuel capacity: 50
- Powerplant: 1 × Curtiss Challenger 6-Cylinder Radial Engine, 180 hp (130 kW)

Performance

- Maximum speed: 130–135 mph (209–217 km/h, 113–117 kn)
- Cruise speed: 107 mph (172 km/h, 93 kn)
- Minimum control speed: 45 mph (72 km/h, 39 kn)
- Range: 550 mi (890 km, 480 nmi)
- Service ceiling: 24,000 ft (7,300 m)
- Rate of climb: 1,000 ft/min (5.1 m/s)
