= LeBlond Aircraft Engine Corporation =

American engine manufacturer, 1928–1937

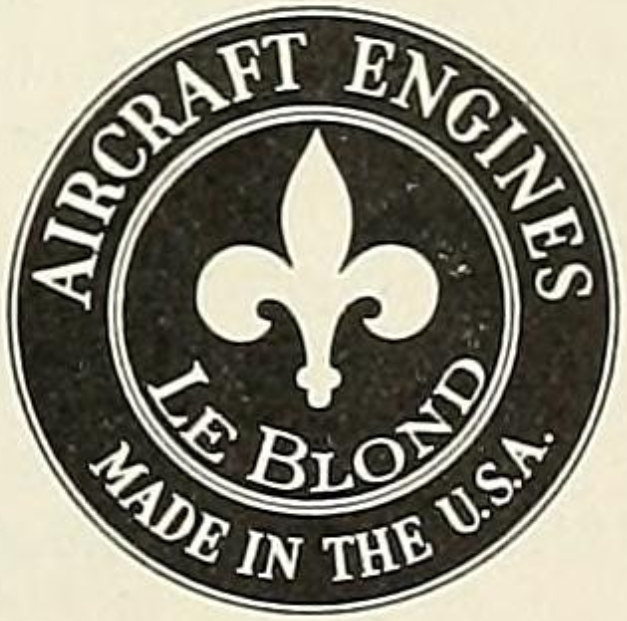
- Industry: Aerospace
- Founded: 1928
- Founder: Richard K. LeBlond
- Defunct: 1937
- Fate: Acquired
- Successor: Ken-Royce Engine Company
- Products: Aeroengines
- Parent: R. K. LeBlond Machine Tool Company

LeBlond Aircraft Engine Corporation was a small engine manufacturer incorporated on April 11, 1928. It was located on the northwest corner of Madison and Edwards Roads in Norwood, Ohio It was a subsidiary of the R. K. LeBlond Machine Tool Company in Cincinnati, Ohio, a manufacturer of metal machining lathes.

== History ==
In 1928 Richard K. LeBlond purchased Detroit Aircraft Engineering Corporation, then a subsidiary of Detroit's automaker Rickenbacker owned by World War I pilot and ace Eddie Rickenbacker and the engineer, Glenn D. Angle. and their 5-cylinder Air-Cat engine. LeBlond employed the company's designer and previous co-owner, Glenn D. Angle, to improve the design for further production and development. The LeBlond line was refined and improved through late 1937.

In December 1937, to offset a large tax liability incurred by the LeBlond Tool company, the subsidiary, LeBlond Engines, was sold at a significant loss to Raymond A. Rearwin of Rearwin Airplanes. The purchase was a perfect fit for Rearwin as his company was one of the largest users of LeBlond engines, and gave Rearwin a well-accepted radial engine to use on his designs. Rearwin renamed the company Ken-Royce Engine Company after his two sons Ken and Royce Rearwin. After Rearwin moved the assets from Norwood to Kansas City, quality-control issues were experienced, which seemed to improve after several employees who had made a competing offer for LeBlond's assets were fired. Production of the line continued until World War Two.

Production of the LeBlond designs never resumed, as the design was uneconomical compared to the newer "flat" (horizontally opposed) engines of the post-war era. LeBlond/Ken-Royce engine parts were provided during the 1950s by Air Associates. In the 1960s the remaining parts were sold to the Antique Airplane Association of Blakesburg, Iowa.

== Products ==
Parts were interchangeable between the 5 and 7-cylinder models of the LeBlond and later Ken-Royce engines, including the cylinder assemblies, gear case and oil pump. As the engine was modular in design, the gear case could be removed intact. The oil pump, being a single unit, could be removed for overhaul or replacement.

The Stromberg NAR-3 carburetor contained a built-in "primer" which acted like a choke by leaking gasoline into the intake stream when activated, in order to prime the engine.

The valve springs used on LeBlond and Ken-Royce engines were of the volute spring type which is wound in a beehive shape out of strip steel, unlike most engines, which have nested coil springs wound from round wire. This type of spring was inherited from the original Detroit Air-Cat as at the time of the Air-Cat design in the late twenties, round wire springs had resonance and fatigue problems. The volute design eliminated the resonance and lasted longer.

=== 3 Cylinder Engines ===
- LeBlond 40-3

=== 5 Cylinder Engines ===
- LeBlond 60-5D
- LeBlond 70-5DE
- LeBlond 85-5DF
- LeBlond 70-5E/Ken-Royce 5E
- LeBlond 80-5F/Ken-Royce 5F
- LeBlond 85-5DF
- LeBlond 90-5F
- LeBlond 90-5G/Ken-Royce 5G

=== 7 Cylinder Engines ===
- LeBlond 90-7D
- LeBlond 110-7DF
- LeBlond 110-7F
- LeBlond 120-7
- Ken-Royce 7F
