= Aeronca L-3 =

WWII liaison aircraft

L-3 Grasshopper
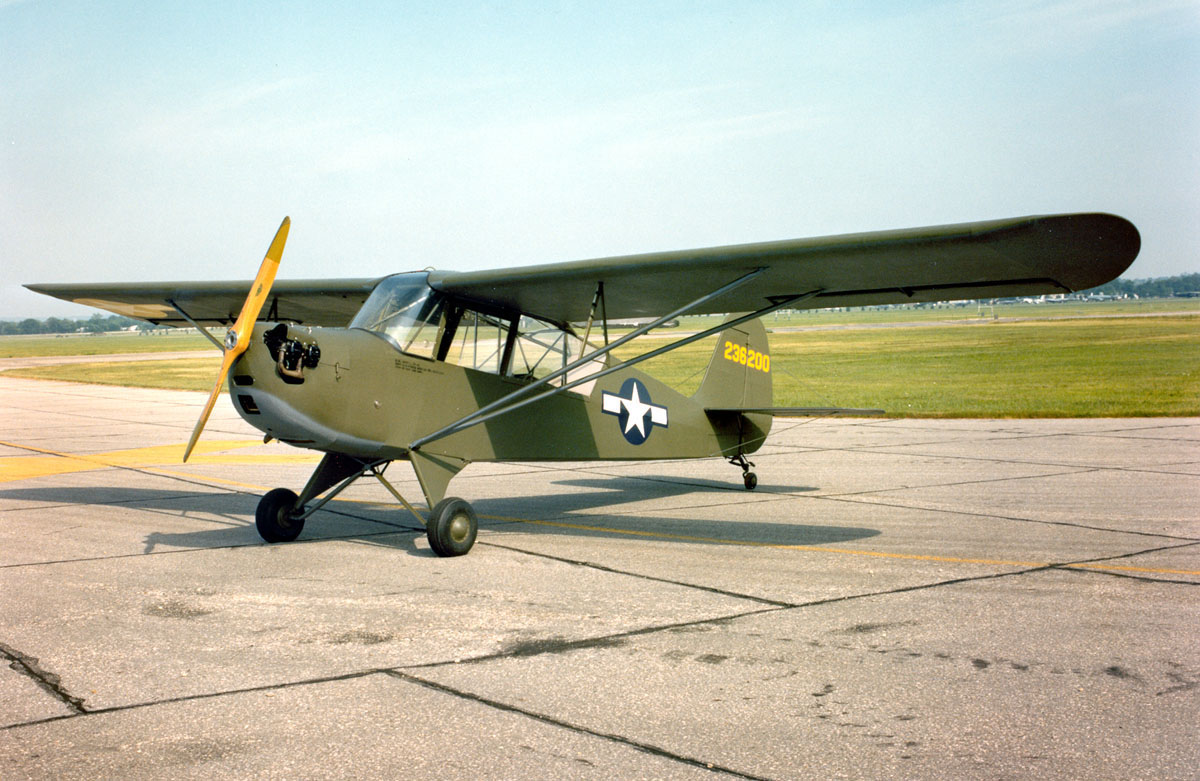
- Aeronca L-3B belonging to the National Museum of the United States Air Force.

General information
- Type: Observation and liaison aircraft
- Manufacturer: Aeronca Aircraft
- Primary user: United States Army Air Forces
- Number built: 1,439

History
- First flight: 1941
- Developed from: Aeronca 50 Chief

The Aeronca L-3 group of observation and liaison aircraft were used by the United States Army Air Corps in World War II. The L-3 series were adapted from Aeronca's pre-war Tandem Trainer and Chief models.

== Design and development ==
In 1941, the United States Army Air Corps ordered four examples of the Aeronca 65 TC Defender, designated YO-58, for evaluation of the suitability of light aircraft for observation and liaison purposes. (It also placed similar orders with Piper and Taylorcraft Aircraft). Service tests during the US Army's annual maneuvers proved successful, and resulted in large orders being placed. In 1942, the O-58 was redesignated L-3. O stood for Observation, L was the designation for Liaison.

When American forces went into combat after Pearl Harbor, the Army Air Force used the L-3 in much the same manner as observation balloons were used during World War I—spotting activities and directing artillery fire. It was also used for liaison and transport duties and short-range reconnaissance which required airplanes to land and take off in short distances from unprepared landing strips. Liaison pilots would train on L-3s before moving on to front-line aircraft like the Piper L-4 or the Stinson L-5. Some L-3s were shipped to North Africa, and subsequently given to the Free French Forces in the area at the time. At least one of the aircraft served with US forces in Italy.

The TG-5 was a three-seat training glider of 1942 based upon the O-58 design. This aircraft retained the O-58's rear fuselage, wings, and tail while adding a new front fuselage in place of the engine. In all, Aeronca built 250 TG-5 gliders for the Army. The Navy received three as the LNR-1.

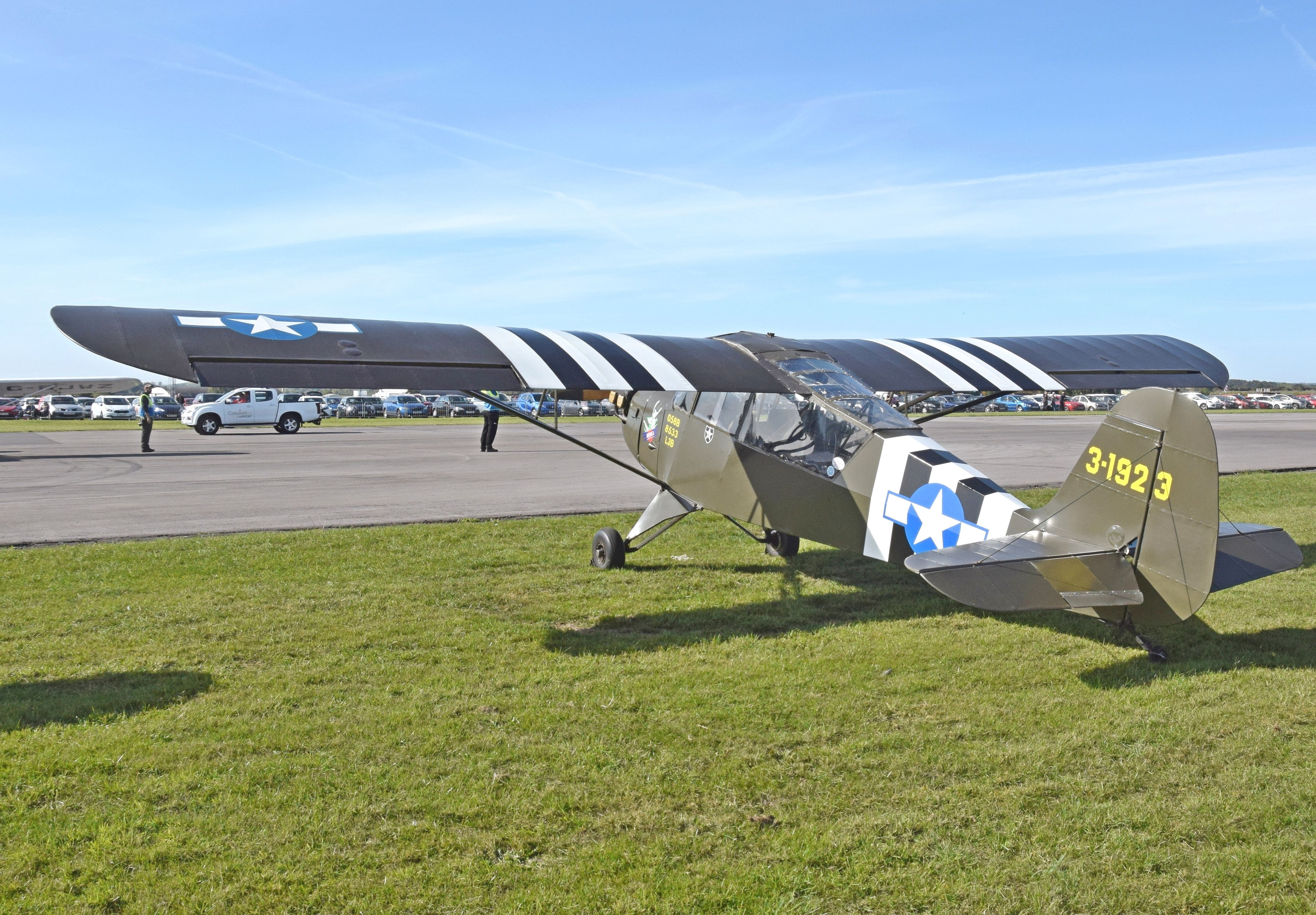
1942 Aeronca Grasshopper L-3B observation and liaison aircraft, formerly of the United States Army Air Forces, now privately owned as G-BRHP in England

== Variants ==
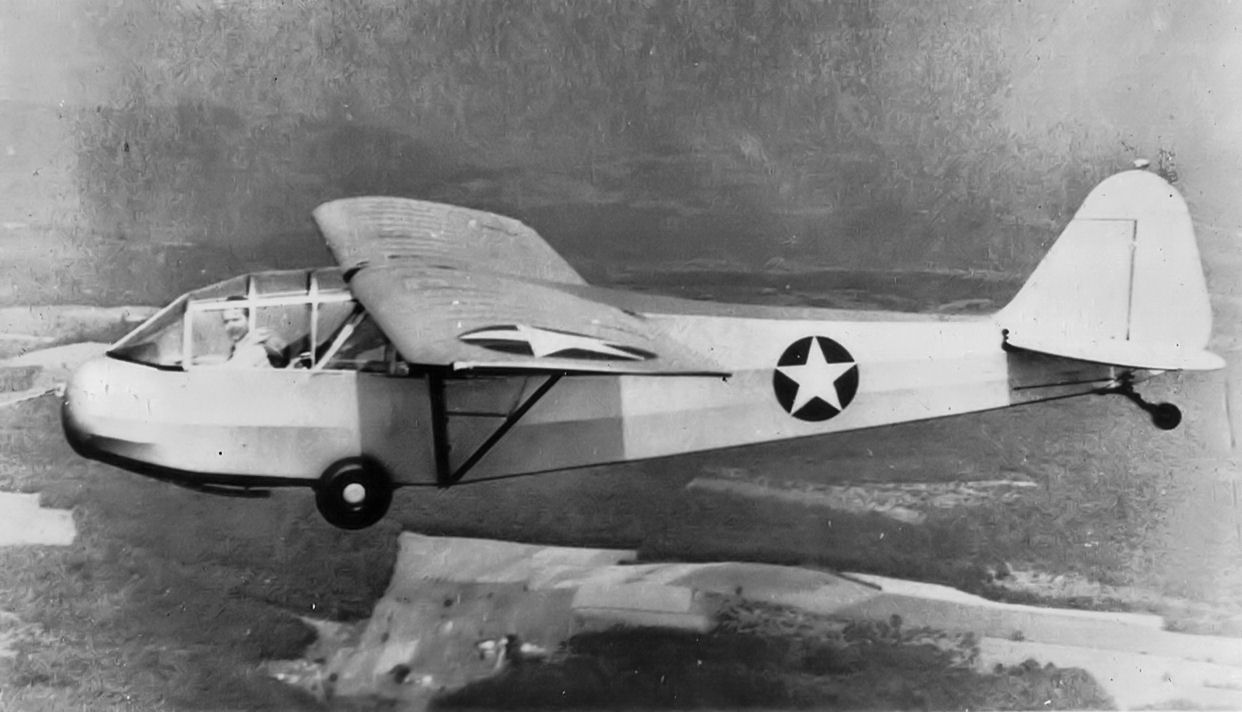
Piper TG-8 glider trainer in flight, similar in appearance to the Aeronca TG-5.

O-58 designation replaced by L-3 designation in April 1942

- YO-58 – Four aircraft with a 65 hp (48 kW) Continental YO-170-3 engine.
- O-58 / L-3 – production order of 50, most used for training in the US.
- O-58A / L-3A – Fuselage widened four inches and extended greenhouse canopy. 20 built.
- O-58B / L-3B – Modified canopy and additional radio equipment. 875 built.
- O-58C / L-3C – As O-58B/L-3B but with radio equipment removed for use as trainer. 490 built.
- L-3D – Aeronca 65TF Defender. 11 aircraft impressed.
- L-3E – Aeronca 65TC Defender. 12 aircraft impressed. Continental engine.
- L-3F – Aeronca 65CA Defender. 19 aircraft impressed.
- L-3G – Aeronca 65L Super Chief with side by side seating. 4 aircraft impressed. Lycoming engine.
- L-3H – Aeronca 65TL Defender. 1 aircraft impressed) Lycoming engine.
- L-3J – Aeronca 65TC Defender 1 additional aircraft impressed. Continental engine.
- JR-1 – Three L-3Cs supplied to the US Navy.
- TG-5 – 250 were built as training gliders for the USAAC.
- TG-33 – TG-5 converted for prone pilot.
- LNR – Three TG-5s supplied to the US Navy.

== Operators ==
Brazil

- Brazilian Air Force L-3C

Cuba

- Cuban Air Force - received 11 L-3Bs under Lend-Lease.

Chile

- Chilean Air Force

30 L-3B delivered to Chile via Lend-Lease program in 1943, all delivered to civil aero clubs. 4 Survivors (CC-KGA at La Ligua, CC-SHA at Chile's Aviation Museum. Two examples in the hands of restorers at Tobalaba airfield, Santiago, and Los Angeles.)

Dominican Republic

- Dominican Air Force - received 3 L-3Bs in 1943.

United States

- United States Army Air Forces
- United States Navy

Venezuela

- Aviación Militar – received three L-3Bs.

== Surviving aircraft ==
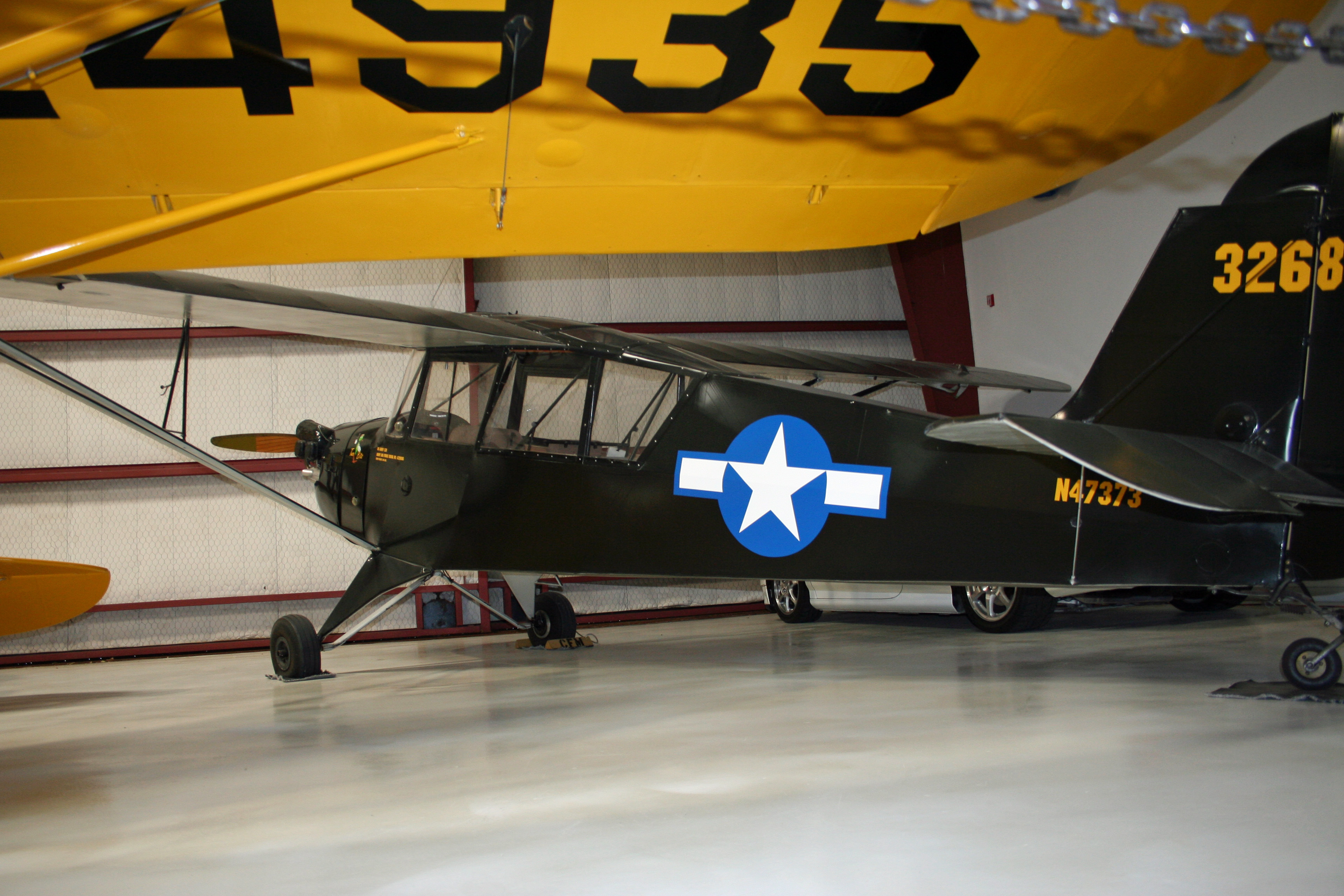
L-3B Grasshopper at the Cavanaugh Flight Museum

Aside from 15 L-3s (2 L-3, 7 L-3B, and 6 L-3C) that remain on the US civil registry as of June 2016, a number have also found their way into museums

- 42-7796 – O-58A airworthy with Mark A. Henry of Dickinson, Texas
- 42-7798 – O-58A airworthy with Blake W. Henderson of Westmoreland, Tennessee.
- 42-14773 – L-3 airworthy with Audie L. Hollon of Milan, Missouri.
- 42-36152 – O-58B airworthy with Lee H. Montgomery in Corsicana, Texas. Previously with the Alamo Liaison Squadron in San Antonio, Texas.
- 42-36200 – L-3B on static display at the National Museum of the United States Air Force at Wright-Patterson AFB near Dayton, Ohio.
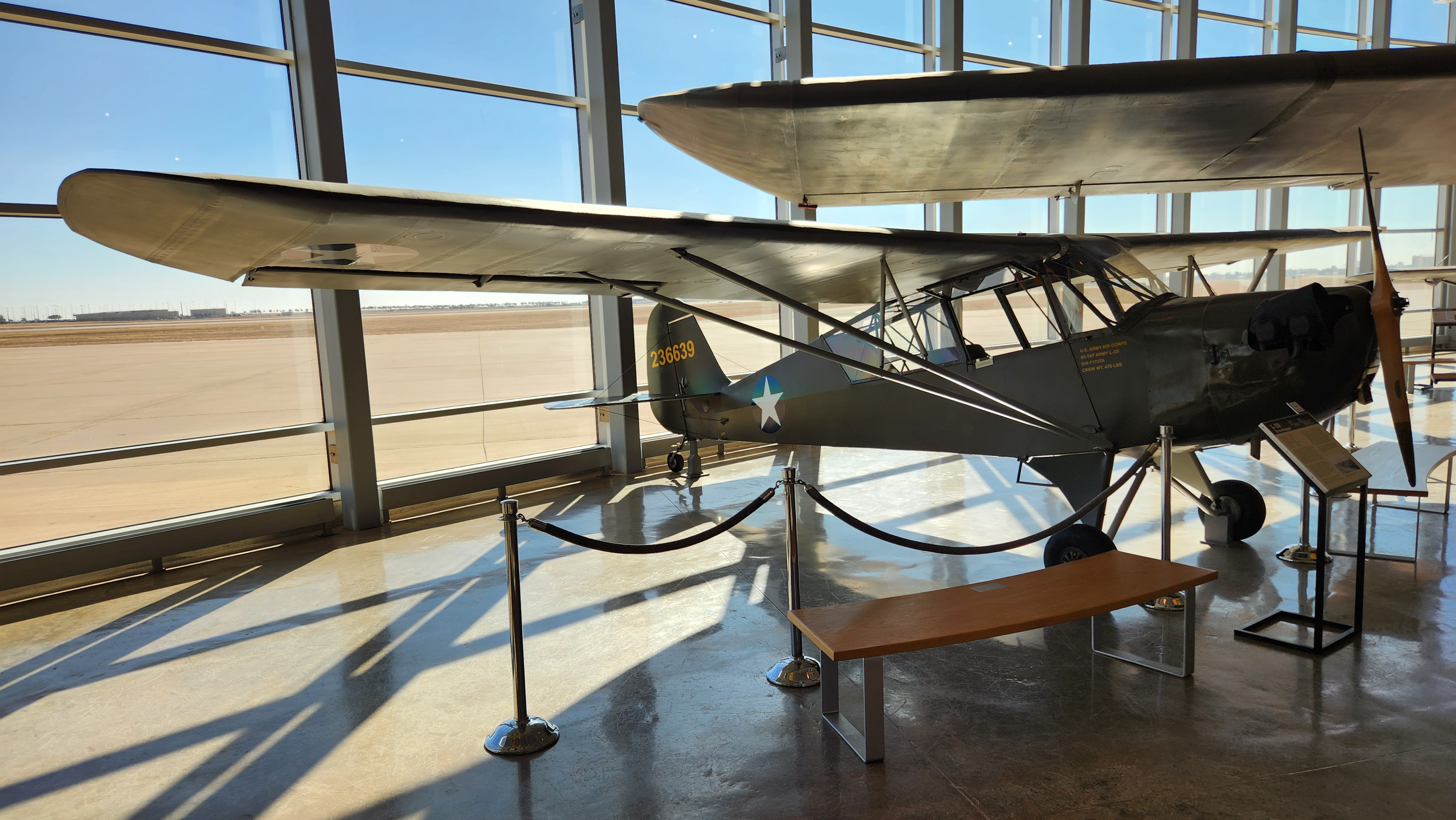
- L-3D on display at the Silent Wings Museum.
  42-36639 – L-3D on static display at the Silent Wings Museum at Lubbock Preston Smith International Airport in Lubbock, Texas
- 43-1844 – O-58B airworthy at the Port Townsend Aero Museum in Port Townsend, Washington.
- 43-2820 – L-3E airworthy with the Butler County Warbirds in Middletown, Ohio.
- 43-26772 – L-3B on static display at the Air Zoo in Kalamazoo, Michigan.
- 43-26819 – L-3B on static display at the Museo Nacional Aeronáutico y del Espacio in Santiago, Chile.
- 43-27184 – L-3B Being restored in Sturgis, Mi. 058B-13213 NC 47262
- Unknown – L-3B on static display at the Museum of Flight in Seattle, Washington.
- Unknown – L-3B airworthy at the Cavanaugh Flight Museum in Addison, Texas. Removed from public display when the museum indefinitely closed on 1 January 2024. To be moved to North Texas Regional Airport in Denison, Texas.
- Unknown – L-3 airworthy at the Wings of Eagles Discovery Center in Elmira, New York.
- Unknown – L-3 on display at the Vintage Flying Museum in Fort Worth, Texas.
- Unknown – L-3B airworthy at the Western Antique Aeroplane & Automobile Museum in Hood River, Oregon.
- Unknown – L-3E airworthy with Air Group One of the Commemorative Air Force in El Cajon, California.
- Unknown – L-3E under restoration with the Spirit of Tulsa of the Commemorative Air Force in Tulsa, Oklahoma.
- Unknown – L-3E airworthy with the Missouri Wing of the Commemorative Air Force in Portage Des Sioux, Missouri.
- Unknown – O-58B airworthy with Nicholas S. Kapotes of Pompton Plains, New Jersey.
- 43-26861 – L-3B airworthy with James S. Tate of Nashville, Tennessee.
- Unknown – L-3 on static display at the National D-Day Memorial in Bedford, Virginia.
- 058B2692 – L-3B airworthy with Air1 Aircraft of Westfield, Massachusetts.
- 058B6212 – O-58B airworthy with Bruce Gapstur of Belle Plaine, Iowa.
- 058B-8272 – O-58B airworthy with Todd H. Dickens of Charlotte, North Carolina.
- 31316 – 65-TAC-L3 airworthy at La Victoria de Chacabuco Airport in Chile. Registered as CC-AVO.
- 43-1952 L3B Airworthy at Goodwood UK. Registered G-BRPR.

== Specifications (L-3C) ==
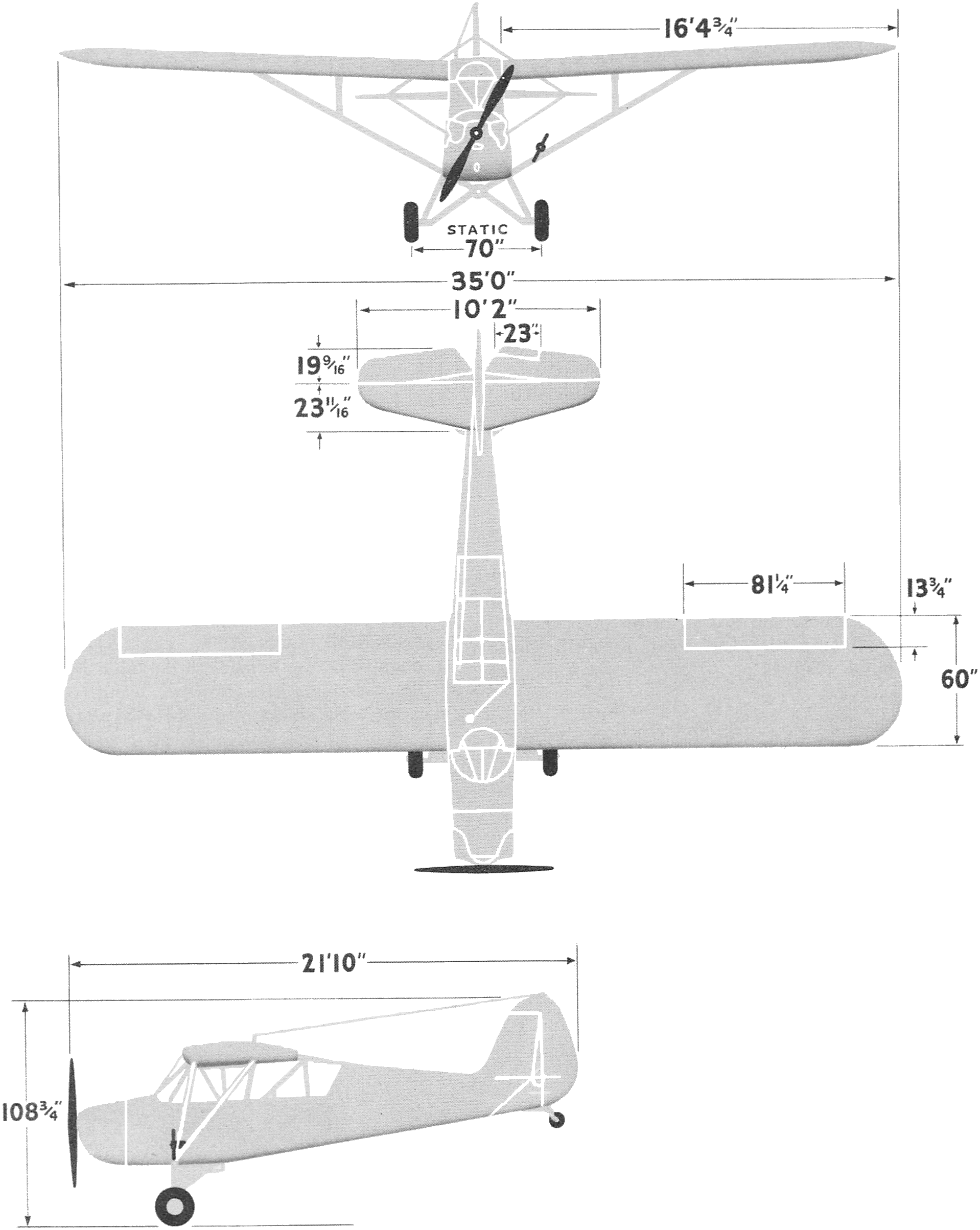
3-view line drawing of the Aeronca L-3 Grasshopper

Data from Jane's Fighting Aircraft of World War II.

General characteristics

- Crew: 2: pilot, observer
- Length: 21 ft 10 in (6.67 m)
- Wingspan: 35 ft 0 in (10.67 m)
- Height: 9 ft 1 in (2.74 m)
- Wing area: 169 sq ft (15.6 m^{2})
- Empty weight: 835 lb (379 kg)
- Gross weight: 1,260 lb (572 kg)
- Powerplant: 1 × Continental O-170-3 OR a Continental A-65-8 flat-4 engine, 65 hp (48 kW)

Performance

- Maximum speed: 87 mph (139 km/h, 76 kn)
- Cruise speed: 79 mph (126 km/h, 69 kn)
- Stall speed: 46 mph (73 km/h, 40 kn)
- Range: 218 mi (350 km, 189 nmi)
- Service ceiling: 10,000 ft (3,050 m)
- Rate of climb: 404 ft/min (2.05 m/s)
- Wing loading: 7.45 lb/sq ft (36.1 kg/m^{2})
- Power/mass: .051 hp/lb (85 W/kg)

== See also ==
- Aeronca Chief family

Related development

- Aeronca 50 Chief

Aircraft of comparable role, configuration, and era

- Taylorcraft L-2
- Piper L-4
- Levente II

Related lists

- List of aircraft of World War II
- List of World War II military gliders
- List of military aircraft of the United States
