= Aeronca 11 Chief =

General aviation aircraft by Aeronca

Aeronca Chief
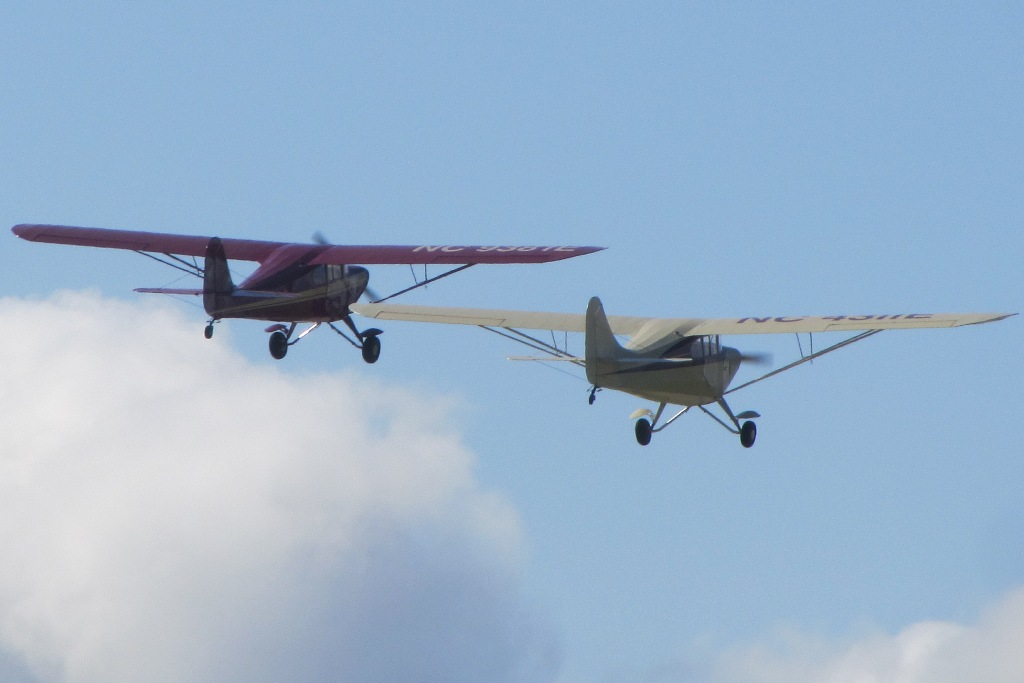

General information
- Type: Light utility aircraft
- Manufacturer: Aeronca
- Designer: Raymond F. Hermes at Aeronca
- Number built: over 2,300

History
- Manufactured: 1946–1950
- Introduction date: 1946
- First flight: 1945
- Variant: HAL Pushpak

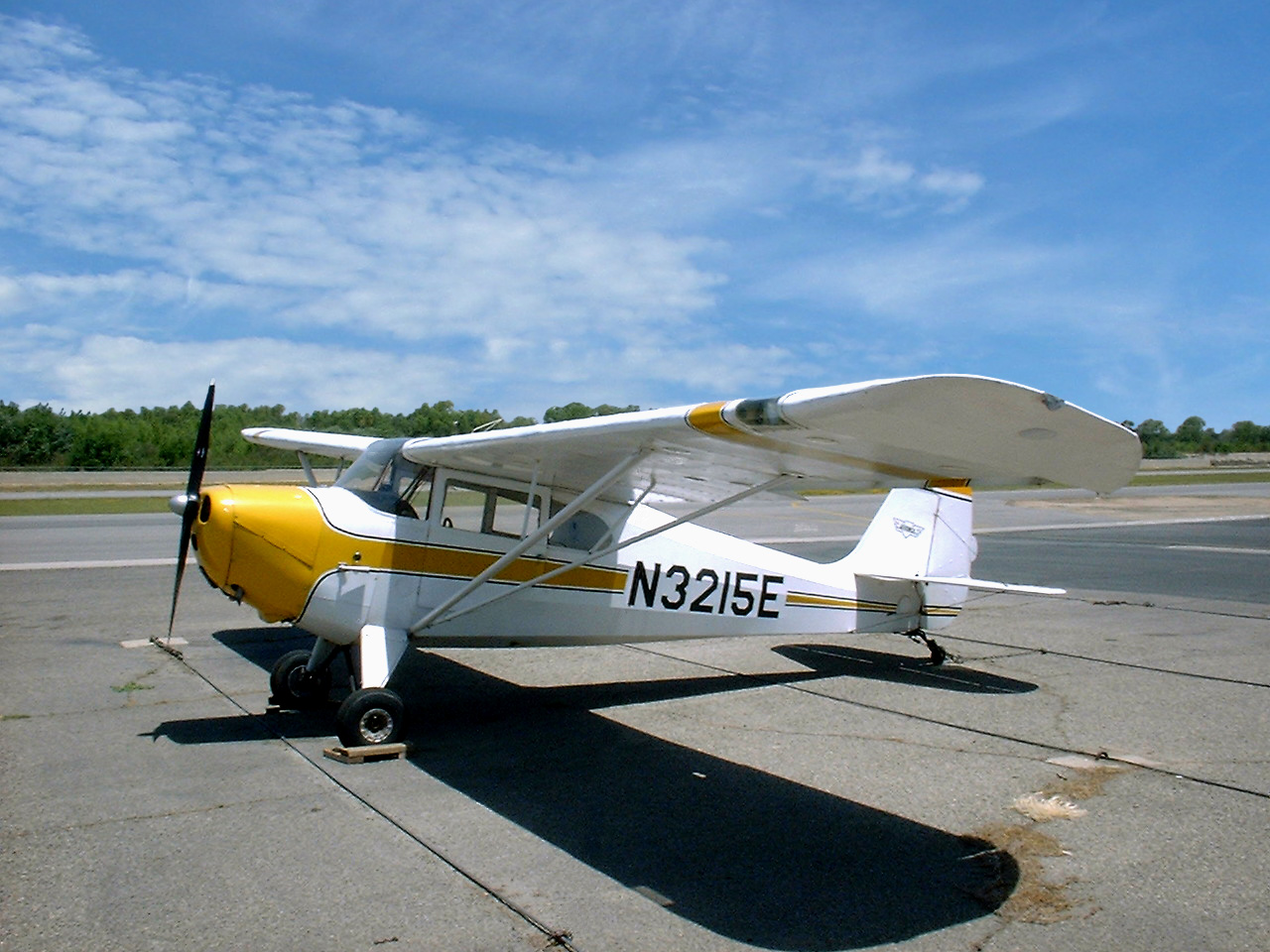
11AC

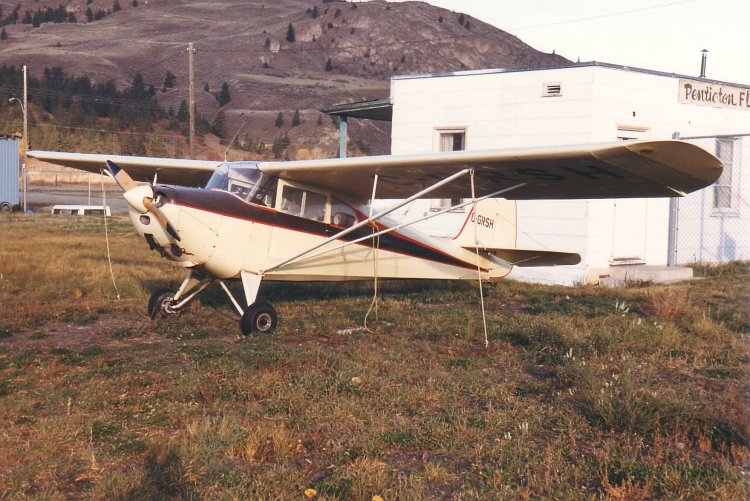
Aeronca 11AC Chief, 1986

The Aeronca Chief is a single-engine, light aircraft with fixed conventional landing gear and two seats in side-by-side configuration, which entered production in the United States in 1945.

Designed for flight training and personal use, the Chief was produced in the United States between 1946 and 1950. The Chief was known as a basic gentle flyer with good manners, intended as a step up from the 7AC Champion, which was designed for flight training.

Like many classic airplanes, it has a significant adverse yaw, powerful rudder and sensitive elevator controls. It had a well-appointed cabin, with flocked taupe sidewalls and a zebra wood grain instrument panel. There was never a flight manual produced for the 11AC or 7AC series airplanes, as a simple placard system was deemed enough to keep a pilot out of trouble.

== Production history ==
The model 11 Chief was designed and built by Aeronca Aircraft Corporation. While it shared the name "Chief" with the pre-war models, the design was not a derivative. Rather, the post-war 11AC Chief was designed in tandem with the 7AC Champion ("Champ")—the Chief with side-by-side seating and yoke controls, and the Champ with tandem seating and joystick controls. The intention was to simplify production and control costs by building a pair of aircraft with a significant number of parts in common; in fact, the two designs share between 70% and 80% of their parts. The tail surfaces, wings, ailerons, landing gear, and firewall forward—engine, most accessories, and cowling—are common to both airplanes. The Chief and the larger Aeronca Sedan also share selected parts, the control wheels, some control system parts, rudder pedals and control systems, so parts passed from plane to plane to save costs. Production costs and aircraft weights were tightly controlled and Aeronca was among the first to use a moving conveyor assembly line, with each stage taking about 30 minutes to complete.

The 11AC Chief entered production at Aeronca in early 1946, with upgraded versions introduced as the 11BC (also called the "Chief") and 11CC "Super Chief," in June 1947 and 1948, respectively. Aeronca was at the time headquartered at Middletown, Ohio, but production facilities there were heavily utilized with the 7AC Champion line; because of this, the model 11 aircraft were assembled at the Dayton Municipal Airport in Vandalia, Ohio. While the Vandalia location was first used only for the assembly of parts fabricated at Middletown, activities there later expanded to include some fabrication work. Only later, toward the end of production did the Chief line return to Middletown.

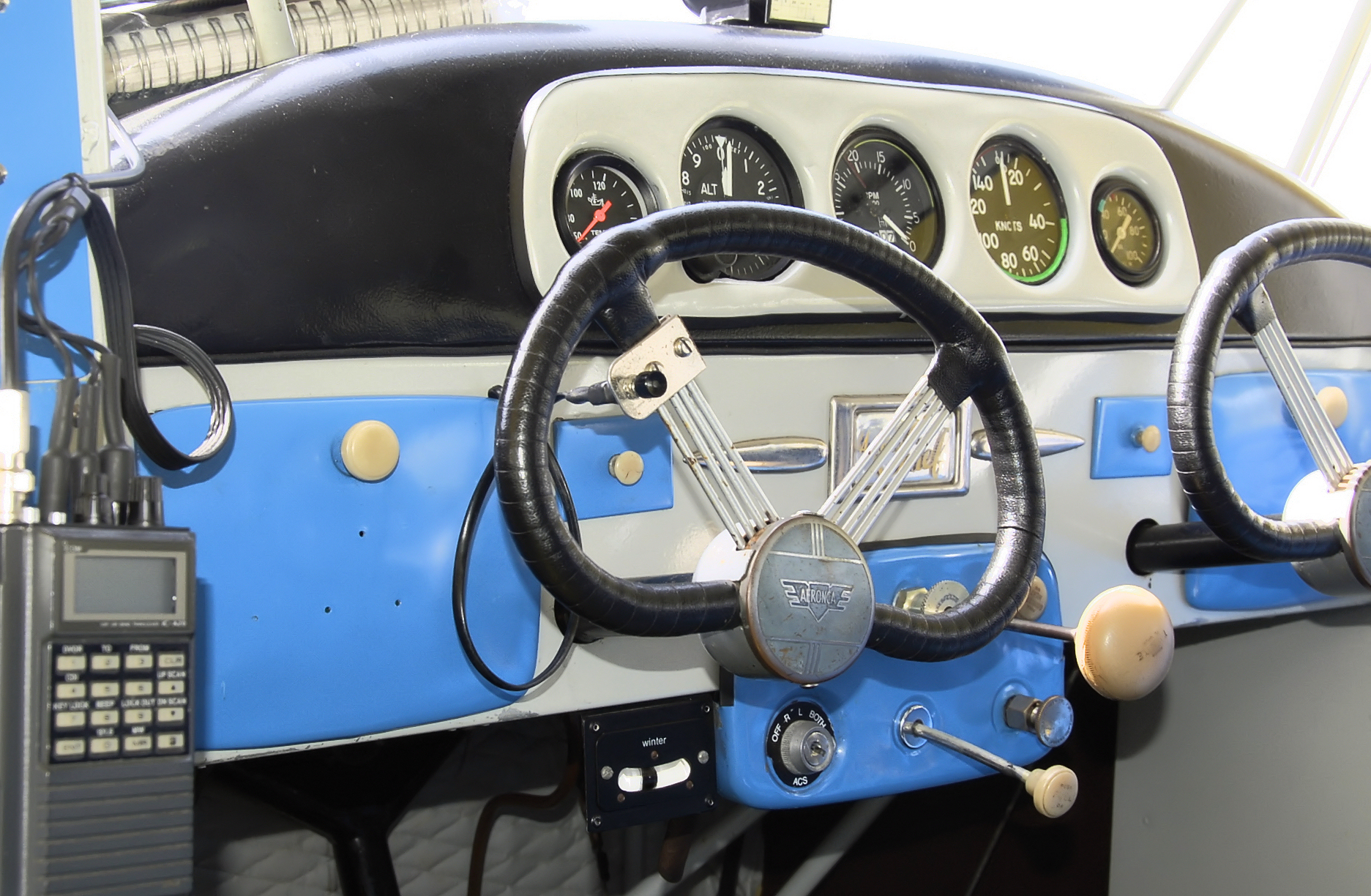
1946 model Aeronca 11AC Chief cockpit

Aeronca ceased all production of light aircraft in 1951. Production of the Chief, which had been outsold by its sibling the Champ by a margin of nearly 4 to 1, had already ended by 1950, with only a few planes produced in 1948–1949. This marked the last time the Chief design was built in the United States.

The 11 series design was sold in the mid-1950s to E. J. Trytek of Syracuse, New York, who held the design until the late 1960s or early 1970s. The HUL-26 Pushpak, built by Hindustan Aeronautics between 1958 and 1968, was very similar to the Super Chief. Trytek did not manufacture any Aeronca Chiefs, but he did license Hindustan Aircraft of India to build the Chief as the HUL-26 "Pushpak", of which 154 were built from 1958 to 1968. The Pushpak can be identified by the smaller rudder surface, squared off at mid-fin, and the larger vertical tail that is found on the 11CC. Several examples are still flying, especially in the United Kingdom.

Ownership of the Chief design then passed to Bellanca Aircraft Corporation in the early 1970s, around the same time they acquired the 7 series Champion/Citabria and its derivative designs. In 1973 Bellanca considered producing an updated version of the Chief for flight training, but the aircraft never entered production. The model 11 designs are currently owned by American Champion Aircraft Corporation, which acquired them sometime before 1991. Ownership of the design in the period between Bellanca's liquidation in 1982 and the American Champion acquisition is unclear.

== Design ==
Like the Taylorcraft B, Piper Vagabond, Cessna 120/140, and Luscombe 8 with which it competed, the Chief features side-by-side seating. As with many light aircraft of the time, including the Taylorcraft B and Piper Vagabond, the Chief's fuselage and tail surfaces are constructed of welded metal tubing. The outer shape of the fuselage is created by a combination of wooden formers and longerons, covered with fabric. The cross-section of the metal fuselage truss is triangular, a design feature that can be traced all the way back to the earliest Aeronca C-2 design of the late 1920s.

The strut-braced wings of the Chief are, like the fuselage and tail surfaces, fabric covered, utilizing aluminum ribs and wood spars. The landing gear of the Chief is in a conventional arrangement, with steel tube main gear which use an oleo strut for shock absorption, and a steerable tailwheel.

All of the models—11AC, 11BC, and 11CC—were approved as seaplanes, with the addition of floats and vertical stabilizer fins; the seaplane versions were designated the S11AC, S11BC, and S11CC, respectively.

== Variants ==
Introduced in 1946, the 11AC was the first version of the design and utilized the Continental A-65-8 engine of 65 horsepower (48 kW), featuring also a McDowell mechanical starter. This McDowell starter was taken from the automotive industry and involved a spring-loaded cam device that would spin the propeller through a compression stroke by a pull on a lever mounted on the cabin floor. The S11AC was a float plane. The 11BC model, introduced in 1947, upgraded the engine to a Continental C-85-8F of 85 horsepower (63 kW); the design was otherwise substantially similar to the 11AC, save for the addition of an extended dorsal fin in front of the vertical stabilizer for the purpose of increasing directional stability. Some, but not all, 11BC aircraft had toe brakes. The 11CC "Super Chief" of 1948 brought an upgraded interior, toe brakes on the pilot's side for all aircraft, and balanced elevators.

As the post-war airplane manufacturers entered into a severe sales slump in 1947, Aeronca brought out the 11ACS which was known as the "Scout" model of the 11AC Chief. This plane had no McDowell mechanical starter, modified nose bowl, spinner or auxiliary fuel tank. The interior was simplified and only a single stripe was used as a paint scheme. Selling for $2475, the same as the Aeronca 7 Champion, only 100 were sold before the sales slump deepened.

In 1973 Bellanca built and flew a prototype trainer based on the model 11. The Bellanca Trainer featured a tricycle landing gear arrangement and appeared to share many parts with the 7ECA Citabria (a derivative of the Champ design). The Bellanca trainer's cowling, wings and struts, main gear, and horizontal tail surfaces all appeared to have come from the Citabria. The vertical stabilizer and rudder appeared similar, though shorter vertically in the prototype. They were extended to full size after flight testing. The fuselage of the trainer featured a rear window. The cabin had a taller modernized instrument panel and other furnishings. The design was never put into production after being shown to dealers in 1973.

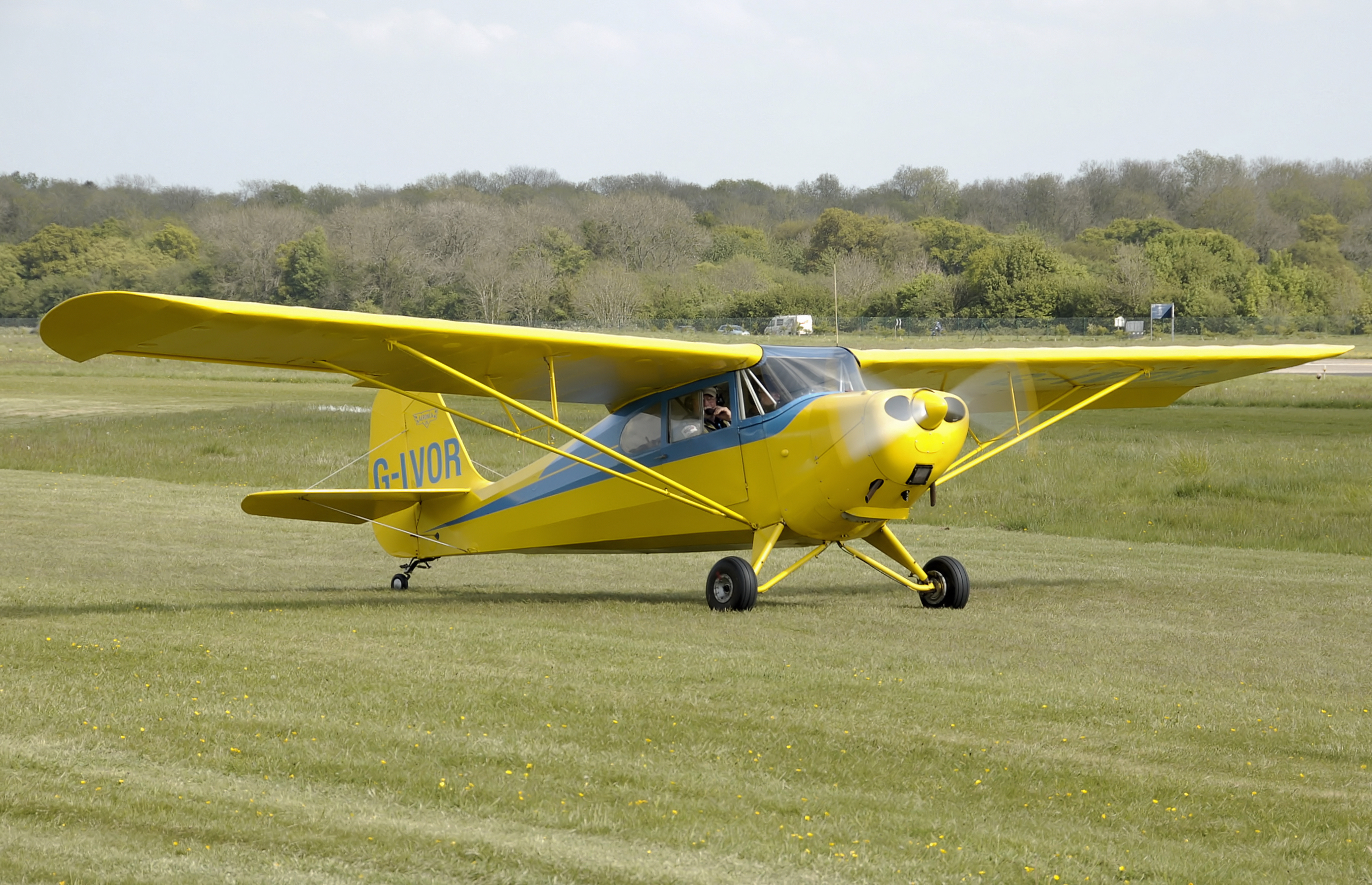
1946 11AC Chief

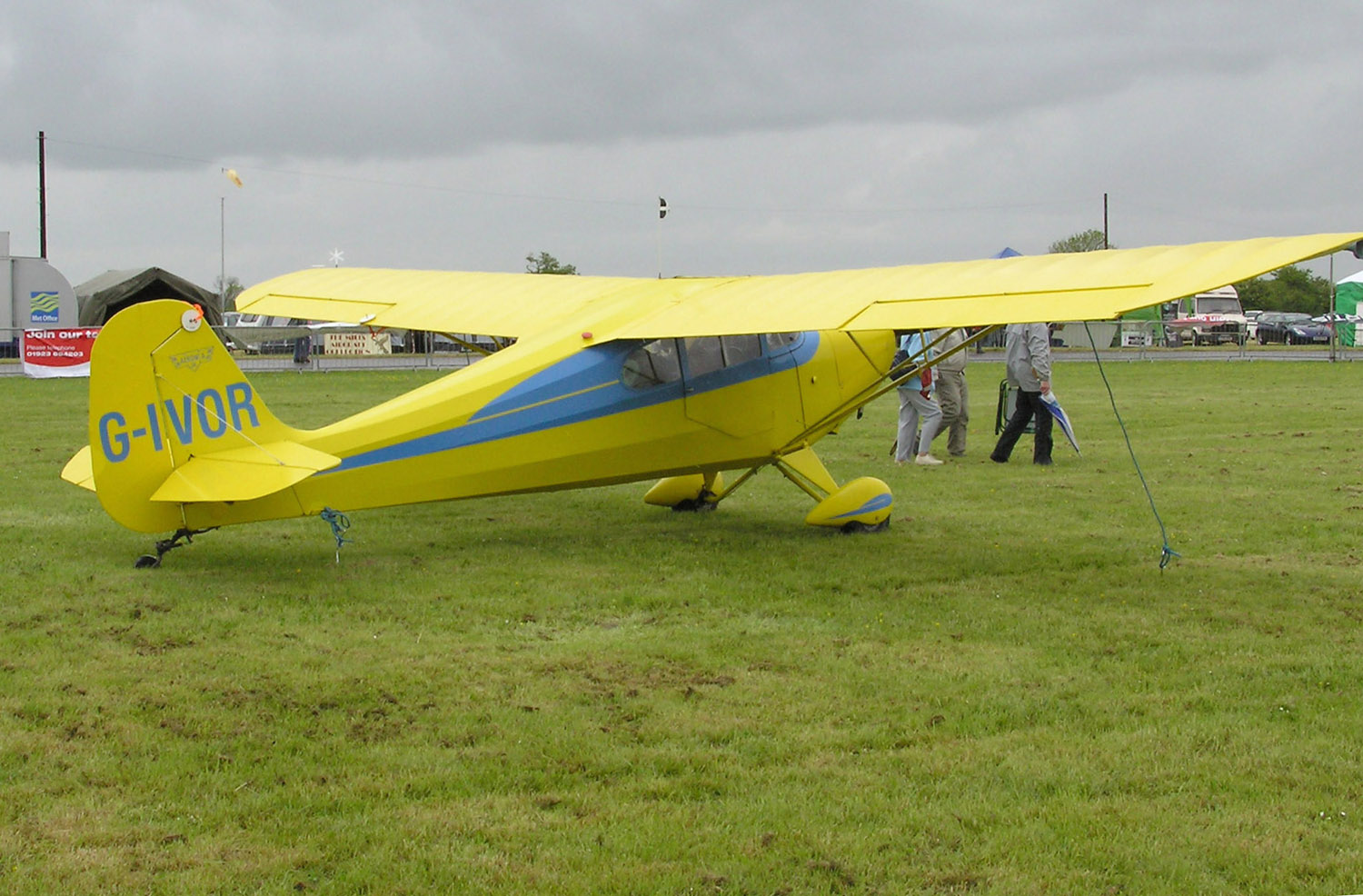
1946 11AC Chief

== Specifications (1948 11CC Super Chief) ==
Data from Jane's All the World's Aircraft 1948

General characteristics

- Crew: one pilot
- Capacity: one passenger
- Length: 20 ft 5 in (6.22 m)
- Wingspan: 36 ft 1 in (11 m)
- Height: 7 ft 0 in (2.13 m)
- Wing area: 175 sq ft (16.3 m^{2})
- Airfoil: NACA 4412
- Empty weight: 820 lb (372 kg)
- Max takeoff weight: 1,350 lb (612 kg)
- Powerplant: 1 × Continental A-65 , 65 hp (48 kW)

Performance

- Maximum speed: 100 mph (160 km/h, 87 kn)
- Cruise speed: 95 mph (153 km/h, 83 kn)
- Stall speed: 38 mph (61 km/h, 33 kn) (landing speed)
- Range: 420 mi (680 km, 360 nmi)
- Rate of climb: 600 ft/min (3.0 m/s)

== See also ==
- Aeronca Chief family

Related development

- Aeronca Sedan
- Aeronca Champ

Aircraft of comparable role, configuration, and era

- Cessna 120/140
- Fisher Dakota Hawk
- Luscombe 8
- Piper Vagabond
- Taylorcraft B
