= Franklin O-150 =

American piston aircraft engine

O-150/4AC
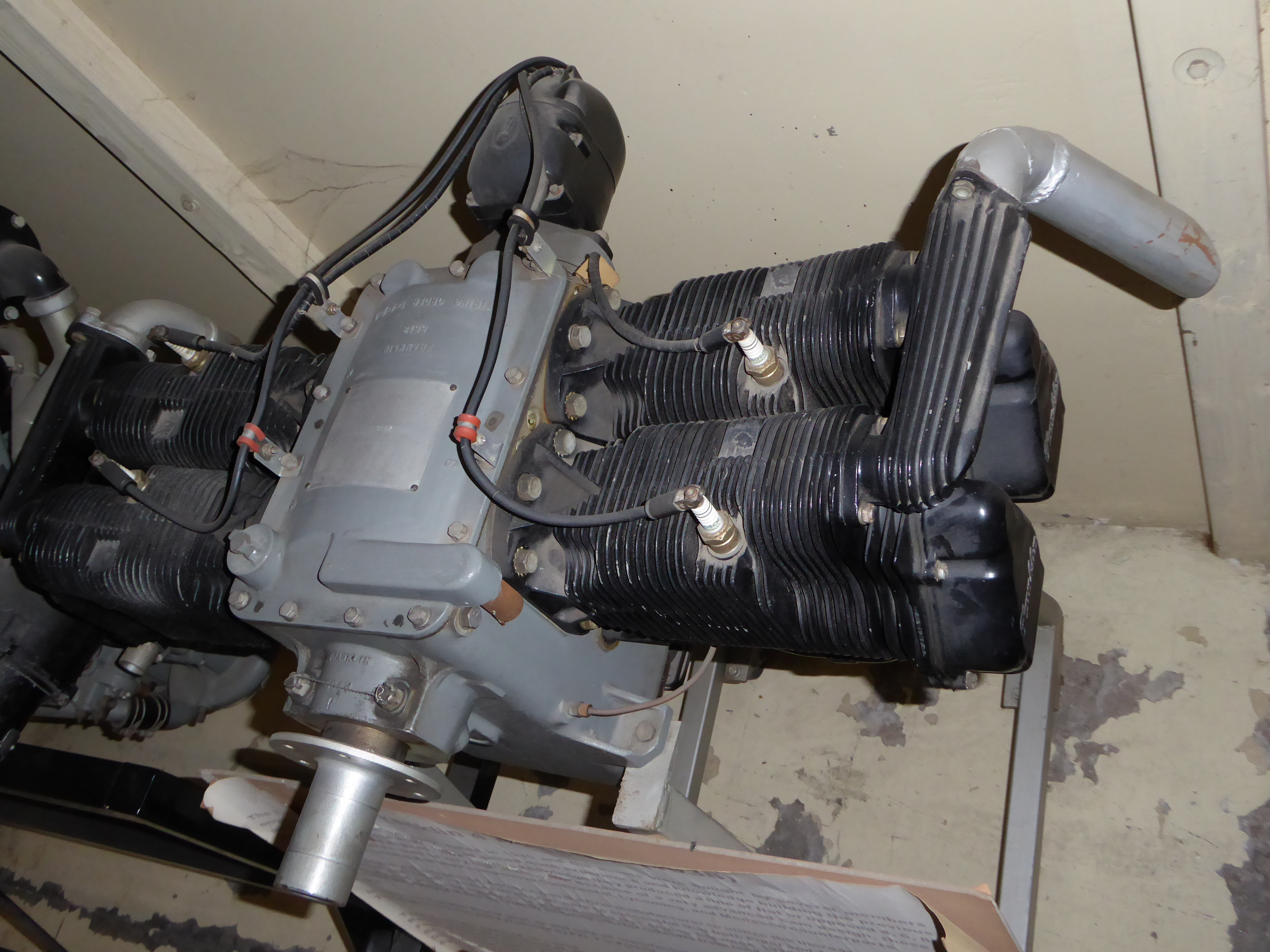
- 4AC-150 engine on display at the San Diego Air & Space Museum
- Type: Piston aircraft engine
- National origin: United States
- Manufacturer: Franklin Engine Company
- First run: 1938

The Franklin O-150 (company designation 4AC-150) was an American air-cooled aircraft engine of the late 1930s. The engine was of four-cylinder, horizontally-opposed layout and displaced 150 cu in (2 L). The power output was nominally 40 hp (30 kW).

== Applications ==
- Aeronca 50 Chief
- Bartlett Zephyr
- Clutton-Tabenor FRED
- Fetterman Chickadee
- Payne MC-7 pusher
- Piper J-3 Cub
- Rose Parakeet
- Taylorcraft BF-65
- Taylorcraft L-2

== Engines on display ==
- Aerospace Museum of California - Franklin 0-150 (4AC-150)

== Specifications (4AC-150) ==
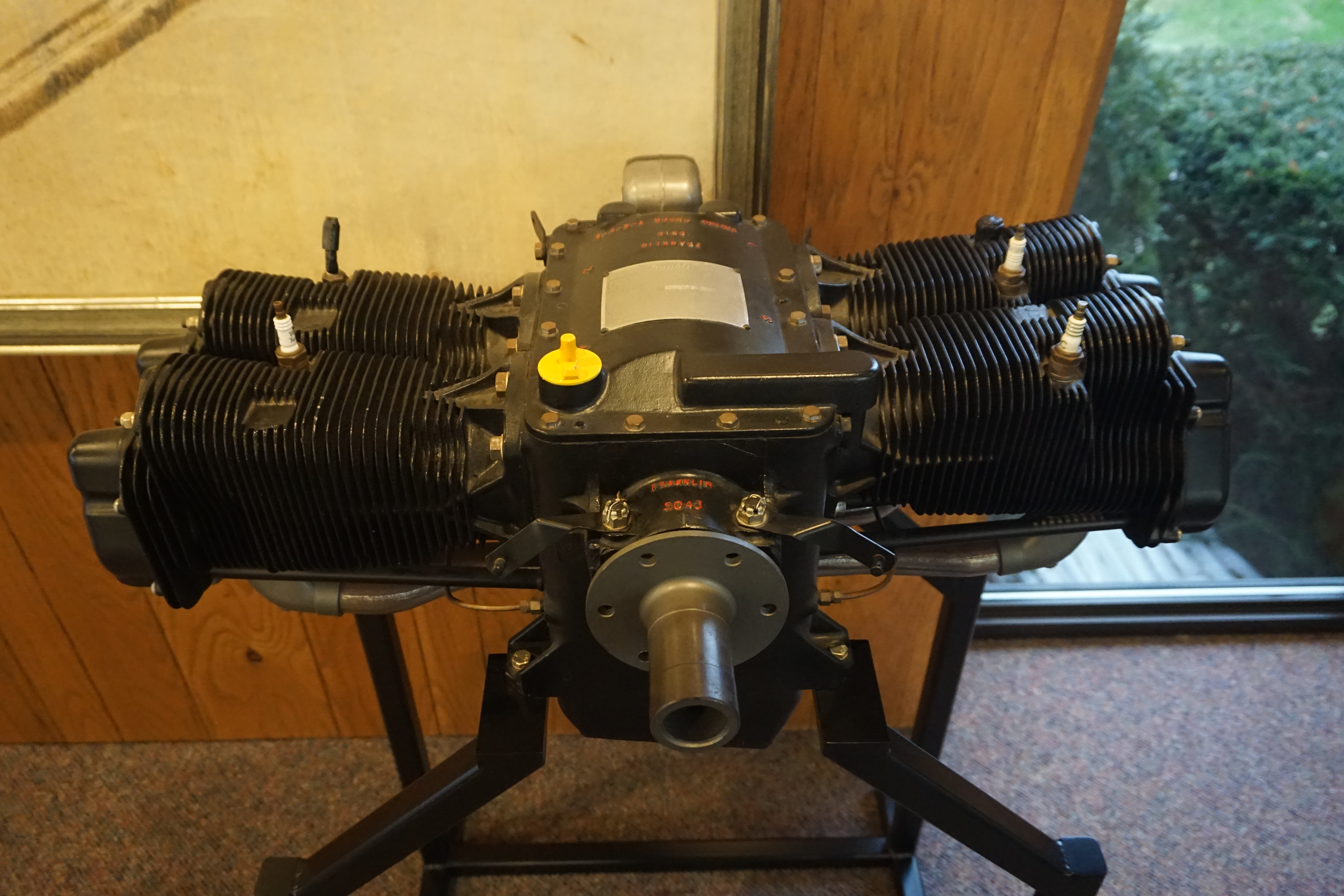
O-150 on display at the Air Zoo

Data from Jane's all the World's Aircraft 1938.

=== General characteristics ===
- Type: 4-cylinder air-cooled horizontally opposed aircraft piston engine
- Bore: 3.625 in (92.1 mm)
- Stroke: 3.625 in (92.1 mm)
- Displacement: 149.6 cu in (2.45 L)
- Length: 27.5 in (70 cm)
- Width: 34.375 in (87.3 cm)
- Height: 18.375 in (46.7 cm)
- Dry weight: 155 lb (70 kg)

=== Components ===
- Valvetrain: Pushrod and rocker operated overhead valves. One intake, one exhaust
- Fuel system: Stromberg NA-S2 updraught carburetor
- Fuel type: 70 Octane gasoline
- Oil system: Wet sump full pressure system
- Cooling system: Air-cooled

=== Performance ===
- Power output: 40 hp (30 kW) at 1,875 rpm
- Compression ratio: 6.66:1
- Fuel consumption: 4.4 gal/h (17 L/h)
- Specific fuel consumption: 0.54 lb/hp/h

== See also ==
Comparable engines

- Lycoming O-145

Related lists

- List of aircraft engines
