= Foxjet ST600 =

ST600

General information
- Type: Light business jet
- Manufacturer: Tony Team Industries
- Status: Abandoned project
- Number built: None

The Foxjet ST600 was a small business jet under development in the United States in the late 1970s. Problems with development, particularly in finding a suitable powerplant, caused the project to be abandoned before any substantial work on the prototype had been done, but the concept proved to be ahead of its time, foreshadowing the very light jets of thirty years later.

== Design and development ==
The ST600 was of familiar business jet configuration, with a low wing, cruciform tail, swept flying surfaces, and engines mounted on pods on the sides of the rear fuselage. The intentions of the project were to create a practical business jet small enough and light enough to take advantage of smaller airfields at a cost of around half of what full-size business jets of the day were selling for. Fuel costs were touted as being as low as nine cents a mile in 1977, compared to fifty cents a mile or higher for contemporary aircraft.

73 orders for the aircraft were taken with Bill Lear ordering the first example.

Three mockups were constructed and were widely displayed at aviation shows around the United States in the late 1970s by Tony Fox with slipping first flight schedules. The project got as far as Foxjet contracting Aeronca to construct the prototype. The engines, however, proved a major stumbling block. The tiny Williams Research type WR44 turbofan that had made the project possible received certification for use in a passenger-carrying aircraft, but due to its selection as the powerplant for cruise missiles, the United States government blocked non-military use of the engine. Without a suitable alternative available, the project could not proceed.

In 2006, a Foxjet mockup was exhibited at the AOPA expo at Palm Springs, Florida by Millennium Aerospace, which had purchased rights to the design in May. The company announced plans to resurrect the design and market it with Pratt & Whitney Canada PW615 engines.

The original prototype was eventually purchased by Lyle Anderson, of Princeton, Minnesota from a used motorcycle dealership in Minneapolis and prior to that, it stood in front of a car dealership. In 2010 it was put in Anderson's front yard, and was a participant in the Rum River Festival parade prior to relocation to Princeton Airport.

== Specifications (as designed) ==
Data from Jane's All The World's Aircraft 1980–81

General characteristics

- Crew: 1–2
- Capacity: 4–5 passengers
- Length: 31 ft 10 in (9.70 m)
- Wingspan: 31 ft 8 in (9.64 m)
- Height: 10 ft 3 in (3.12 m)
- Wing area: 125.0 sq ft (11.61 m^{2})
- Aspect ratio: 8:1
- Empty weight: 2,408 lb (1,092 kg)
- Max takeoff weight: 4,550 lb (2,064 kg)
- Fuel capacity: 218 US gal (830 L)
- Powerplant: 2 × Williams Research WR44-800 turbofan, 850 lbf (3.8 kN) thrust each

Performance

- Cruise speed: 410 mph (660 km/h, 360 kn) (max cruise), 329 mph (286 kn; 529 km/h) (normal cruise)
- Stall speed: 85 mph (137 km/h, 74 kn) (flaps down)
- Range: 1,400 mi (2,300 km, 1,200 nmi)
- Service ceiling: 41,000 ft (12,000 m)
- Rate of climb: 3,400 ft/min (17 m/s)
- Take-off run to 50 ft (15 m): 2,700 ft (820 m)
- Landing run from 50 ft (15 m): 1,860 ft (570 m)

== See also ==
Aircraft of comparable role, configuration, and era

- Cessna Citation I
- Gulfstream American Hustler
- Learjet 25
