= Aeronca Aircraft =

American aerospace company

Aeronca, Incorporated
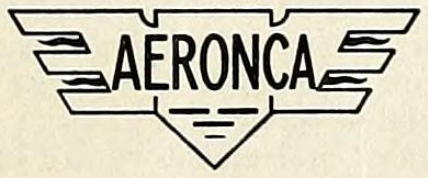
- Type: Operating Division
- Industry: Aerospace
- Founded: 1928; 98 years ago
- Headquarters: Middletown, Ohio, United States
- Key people: Conrad Dietz; Carl Friedlander; Ray Hermes; Roger Schlemmer; Taylor Stanley
- Owner: Fleet Aerospace (1986-1996); Magellan Aerospace (1996-present)
- Parent: Fleet Aerospace (1986-present)
- Divisions: Longren Aircraft Corporation
- Website: aeroncainc.com

Aeronca, contracted from Aeronautical Corporation of America, located in Middletown, Ohio, is a US manufacturer of engine components and airframe structures for commercial aviation and the defense industry, and a former aircraft manufacturer. From 1928 to 1951, the company was a major producer of general aviation aircraft, and also produced the engines for some of their early designs.

Aeronca is now (2011) a division of Magellan Aerospace, producing aircraft, missile, and space vehicle components at the same location adjacent to Middletown's Hook Field Municipal Airport.

== History ==
=== Origins ===
Originally formed as the Cincinnati Aeronautical Corporation, the Aeronautical Corporation of America was founded November 11, 1928, in Cincinnati, Ohio. The name was generally abbreviated to Aeronca. Backed by the financial and political support of the prominent Taft family and future Ohio senator Robert A. Taft who was one of the firm's directors, Aeronca became the first American company to build a commercially successful general aviation aircraft. The corporation changed its name to Aeronca Aircraft Corporation in 1941. When production ended in 1951, Aeronca had sold 17,408 aircraft in 55 models.

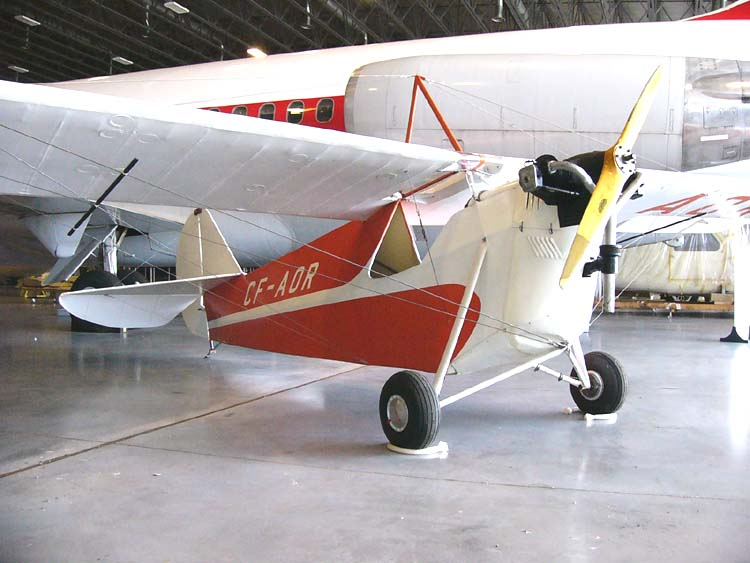
Aeronca C-2 at the Canada Aviation and Space Museum in Ottawa, Ontario

Production began with the Jean A. Roche-designed Aeronca C-2 monoplane, often called the "Flying Bathtub", in 1929, the C designation standing for Cincinnati. The next major model was the Scout of 1937, a two-seater, which was developed into the Chief and Super Chief the next year.

The Ohio River flood of 1937 at the Lunken Airport resulted in the entire airport area being washed away. Aeronca's factory was destroyed, along with the tooling and almost all of the very early blueprints and drawings. As a result, two years later the decision was made to move out of the floodplain to Hook Field Municipal Airport in Middletown, Ohio. By October 1940 the plant had to expand by 25,000 sq ft (2,300 m^{2}) to keep up with production demands.

=== World War II ===
The Defender, a tandem trainer version of the Chief with a higher rear seat, was used in training many of the pilots who flew in World War II.

Several observation and liaison aircraft designs were also produced during and after the war, seeing extensive front line use, including the L-3/O-58.

A glider-trainer version of the Defender, the Aeronca TG-5, replaced the engine with a third seat, facilitating the training of combat glider pilots destined to fly larger craft, such as the Waco CG-4A.

Aeronca's World War II designs—the Defender, TG-5 and L-3 variants—differed significantly from nearly all previous and subsequent Aeroncas by replacing Aeronca's traditional three-longeron, triangular-cross-section fuselage with a four-longeron, rectangular-cross-section fuselage for additional strength.

=== Postwar ===
External image
- A Visit to the Home of Aeronca – promotional film depicting the Middletown factory

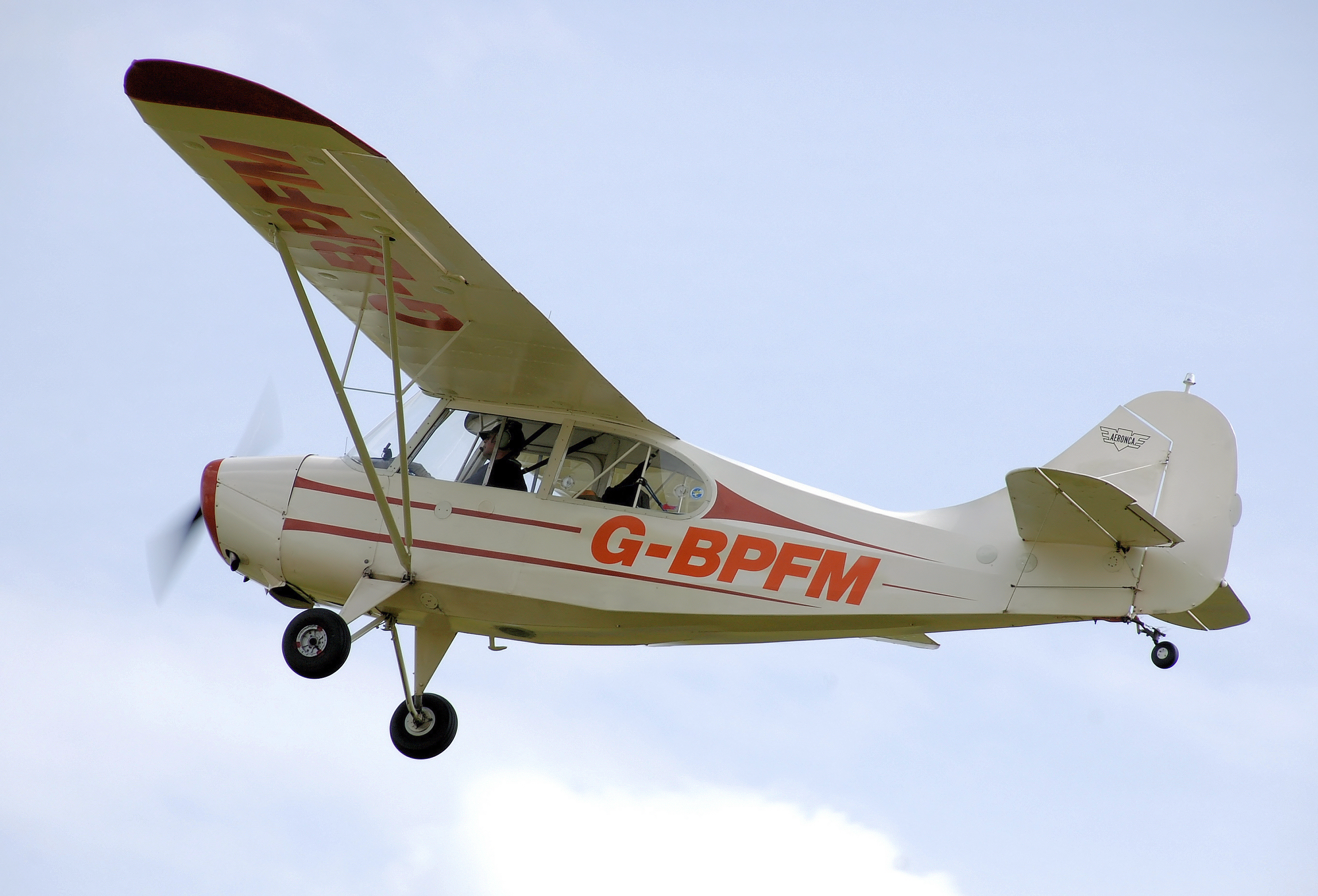
Aeronca 7AC Champion

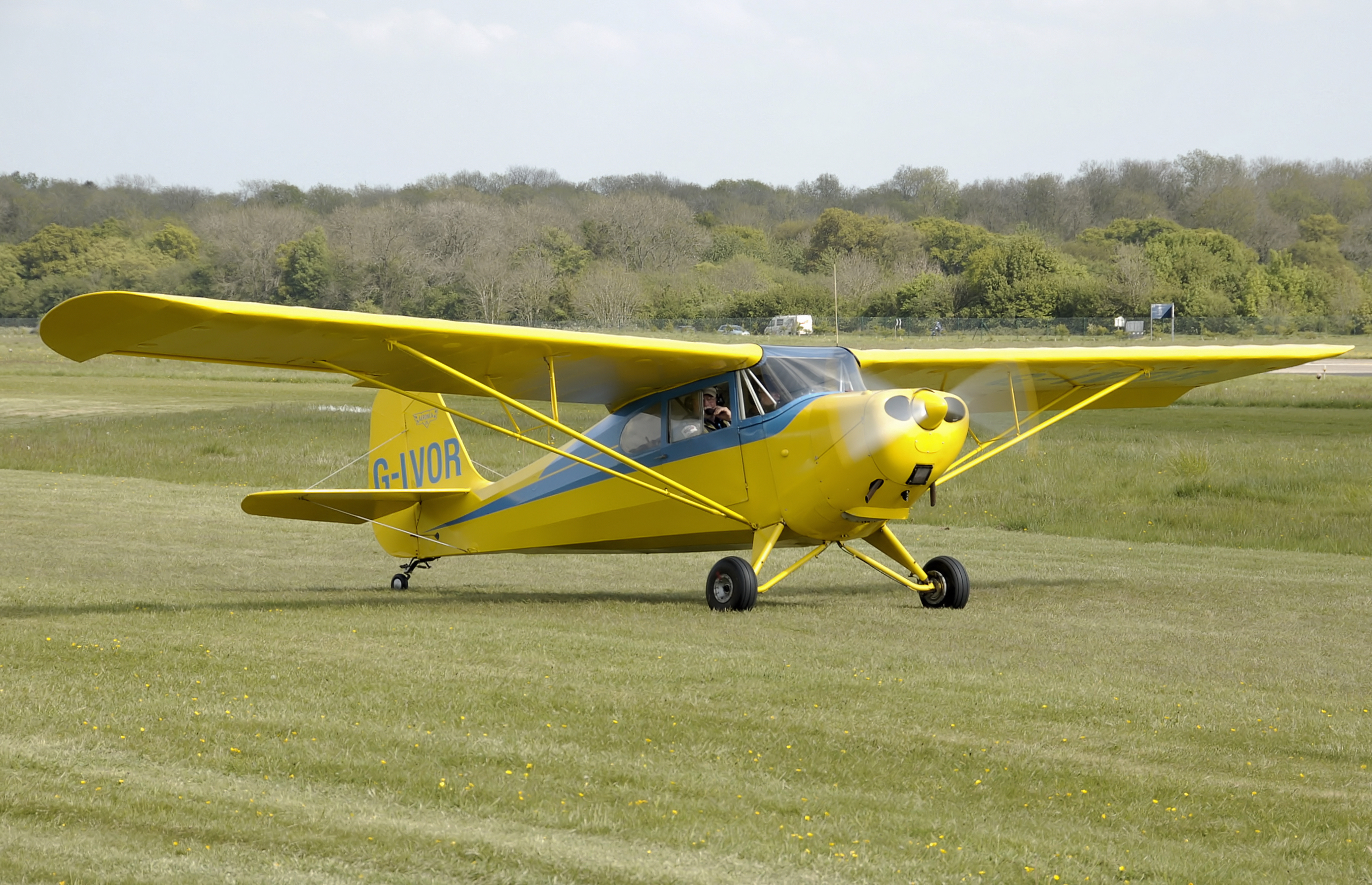
Aeronca 11AC Chief

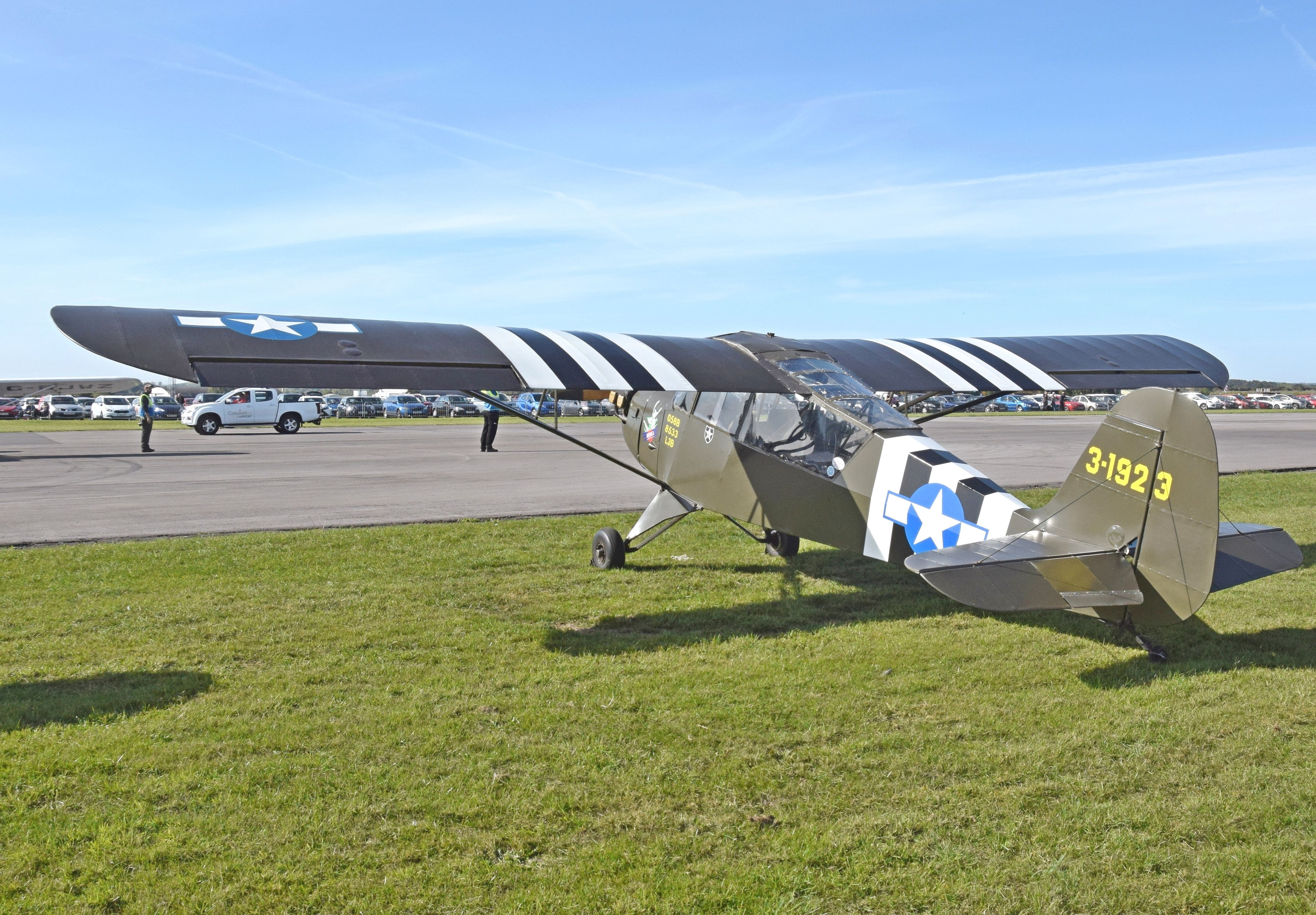
Aeronca L-3B Grasshopper

In 1945, following the end of World War II, Aeronca returned to civilian production with two new models, the 7AC Champion and the 11AC Chief. While the Champ shared its tandem seating arrangement with the prewar tandem trainer—and the Chief shared its name and seating arrangement with the prewar Chief designs—both were new fresh paper designs and designed for production economy, sharing over 80% of the components. One of the very few aircraft manufacturers that used an assembly line production layout.

A benefit of the concurrent development was that the new designs had about 80% of their parts in common. Nevertheless, the tandem-seat Champ—resembling the extremely popular Piper J-3 Cub—was favored by the market, evidenced by its outselling its sibling, the Chief, at a rate of 4 to 1. Between 1945 and 1951, nearly 8,000 Champions were manufactured; while over the same period, approximately 2,000 Chiefs were produced.

To accommodate the new production, the company leased two hangars at Dayton Municipal Airport for aircraft assembly.

=== New ownership ===
Aeronca ceased light aircraft production in 1951, and in 1954 sold the Champion design to the new Champion Aircraft Corporation of Osceola, Wisconsin, which continued building variants of the Champion as well as the derivative design, the Citabria. The venerable aircraft design was acquired again by the Bellanca Aircraft Company in 1970 and again to American Champion in 1988, where it remains in production.

Aeronca purchased the Longren Aircraft Corporation in 1959. However, by 1965 it was nearly bankrupt and a new president, Alfred A. Handschumacher, was hired to return the company to profitability.

In the early 1970s, Aeronca was contracted by Bede Aircraft to assemble its first Bede BD-5J Microjet—the world's smallest jet airplane—but, after its experiences with the prototype, Aeronca declined to be further involved with the program.

In 1978 Aeronca planned to start aircraft production again with production of a prototype very light business jet, the Foxjet ST600. The project was eventually cancelled due to lack of WR-44 engine availability.

Fleet Aerospace launched a successful hostile takeover of the company in 1986.

Aeronca now builds components for aerospace companies including Boeing, Northrop Grumman, Lockheed and Airbus. In its 23-year history as a general aviation and military aviation manufacturer, Aeronca produced 17,408 aircraft spanning 55 different models.

== Products ==
=== Aircraft ===
Model name	First flight	Number built	Type
Aeronca C-4	1928	1	Prototype single engine three seat open cockpit biplane
Aeronca C-1 Cadet	1931	3	Single engine single seat high wing open cockpit monoplane
Aeronca C-2	1929	164	Single engine single seat high wing open cockpit monoplane
Aeronca C-3		400	Single engine two seat high wing closed cockpit monoplane
Aeronca C-100		21	Single engine two seat high wing closed cockpit monoplane
Aeronca L		65	Single engine two seat low wing cabin monoplane
Aeronca K		357	Single engine two seat high wing closed cockpit monoplane
Aeronca 50 Chief	1938	175+	Single engine two seat high wing cabin monoplane
Aeronca 60		118	Single engine two seat high wing cabin monoplane
Aeronca 65 Super Chief		2,059	Single engine two seat high wing cabin monoplane
Aeronca L-3	1941	1,487+	Military version of Model 65
Aeronca TG-5		250	Glider version of L-3
Aeronca LNR		3	Navy version of TG-5
Aeronca L-16		609	Military version of Model 7
Aeronca 7 Champion	1944	7,200+	Single engine two seat high wing cabin monoplane
Aeronca 9 Arrow		1	Prototype single engine two seat low wing cabin monoplane
Aeronca 10 Eagle	N/A	1 mockup	Unbuilt single engine four seat mid wing cabin monoplane
Aeronca 11 Chief	1945	2,300+	Single engine two seat high wing cabin monoplane
Aeronca 12 Chum		2	Prototype single engine two seat low wing cabin monoplane
Aeronca 15 Sedan	1947	561	Single engine four seat high wing cabin monoplane

=== Missiles ===
- GT-1 (missile)

=== Engines ===
- Aeronca E-107
- Aeronca E-113

== See also ==
- Aeronca Museum
- International Aircraft
- Metal Aircraft Corporation
- Taylorcraft Aircraft
