= Aeronca Chief family =

Family of American light aircraft

Chief
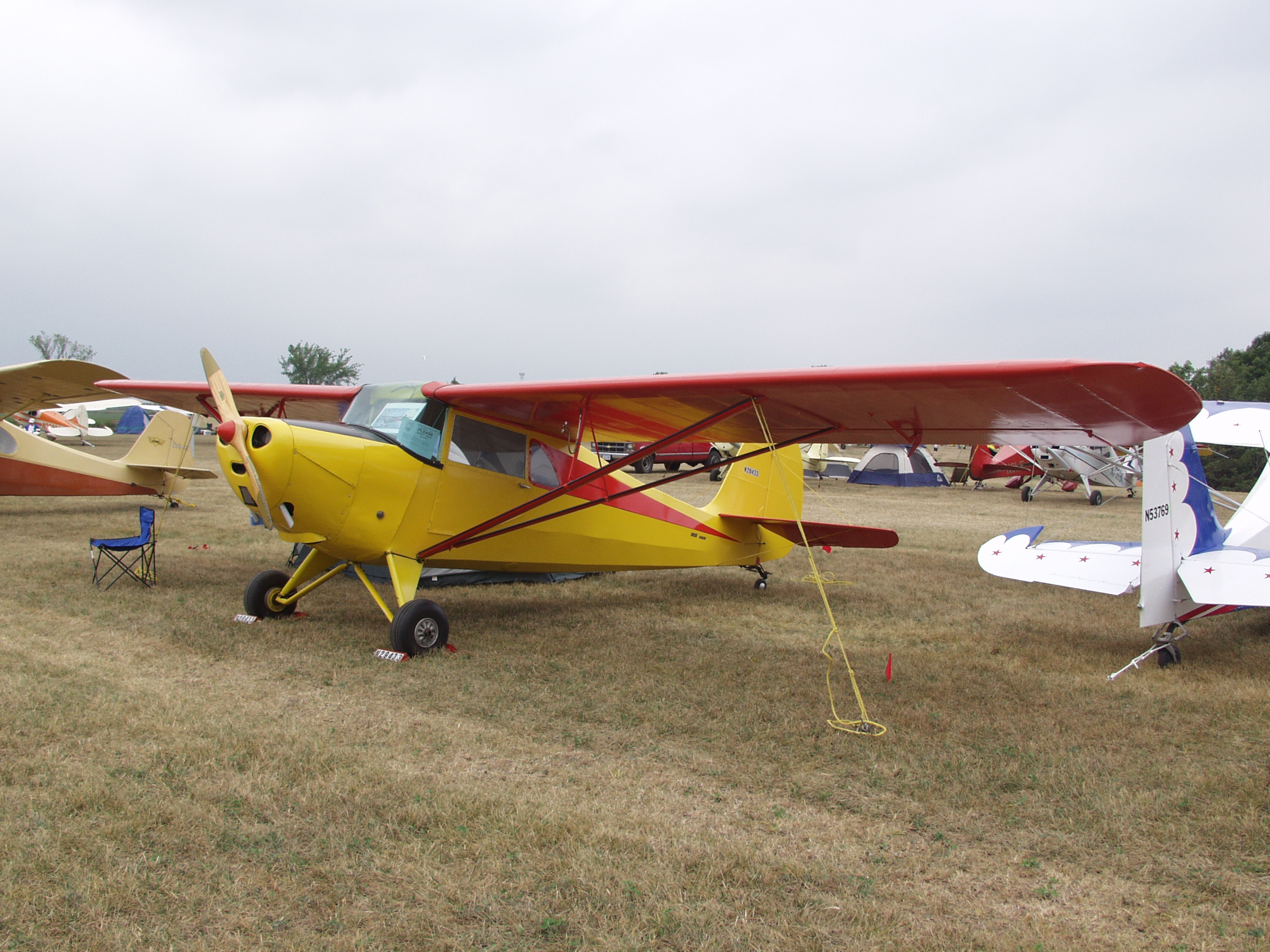
- Model 65CA

General information
- Type: Civil utility aircraft
- National origin: United States of America (USA)
- Manufacturer: Aeronca
- Number built: ca 13,700

History
- Manufactured: 1936 to 1949
- First flight: 1937
- Developed from: Aeronca C
- Variants: Aeronca K; Aeronca L-3; Aeronca 11 Chief; Aeronca Champion; Aeronca 50 Chief
- Developed into: HAL HUL-26 Pushpak

The Aeronca K series, Aeronca Chief, Aeronca Super Chief, Aeronca Tandem, Aeronca Scout, Aeronca Sea Scout, Aeronca Champion and Aeronca Defender were a family of American high-winged light touring aircraft, designed and built starting in the late 1930s by Aeronca Aircraft.

== Design and development ==
Aeronca was noted for producing light side-by-side two-seat touring aircraft since the introduction of the Aeronca C-2 in 1929. A more refined aircraft with an improved undercarriage and steel tube wing bracing struts in place of wires, was developed in 1937 as the Aeronca K, powered by a 42 hp (31 kW) Aeronca E-113 engine, beginning the long line of Aeronca high wing touring, training, military liaison and observation aircraft of the 1930s and 1940s. The K series was powered by a variety of 40 hp (30 kW) to 50 hp (37 kW) Aeronca, Continental, Franklin or Menasco engines.

Consumer demand for more comfort, longer range and better instrumentation resulted in development of the Aeronca 50 Chief in 1938. Although little more than an incremental development of the K series the Model 50 heralded a new designation system used for the high-winged tourers, including the manufacturer and power rating of the engine, dropping the letter designation system. Thus the Aeronca 65CA Super Chief' was powered by a 65 hp (48 kW) Continental A-65 with side-by-side seating and improvements over the 65C Super Chief. Other developments included tandem seating for use as trainer, liaison, observation aircraft or glider trainers as well as float-plane versions. Throughout the production life of the Aeronca Chief family the aircraft was improved incrementally, from a rather basic specification to a reasonably comfortable tourer with car-style interior.

== Description ==
The Aeronca high-wing formula used a welded steel tube fuselage covered with fabric, wooden wings covered with plywood and fabric braced by V-struts to the rear undercarriage attachment point on the lower fuselage. Tail surfaces were also built up with welded steel tubing covered with fabric. The fixed tail-wheel undercarriage, sprung with oleo struts and faired triangular side members hinged at the fuselage. A small tail-wheel on a spring steel leaf at the extreme rear of the fuselage completed the under-carriage. The engine is fitted conventionally in the nose and was either semi-cowled or fully cowled using sheet aluminium alloy, depending on model. Some civilian models had side-by-side seating in a well-glazed cabin under the wing centre-section, with entry through car style doors either side. A tandem seating arrangement was developed for training and military models with the rear seat mounted 9 in (229 mm) inches higher than the front to allow the instructor to use the same instruments as the trainee and improve forward view from the back seat. Tandem seat aircraft had extensively glazed cockpits to allow good all-round visibility.

A wide variety of engines were available for use on the Aeronca Chief series, including home grown Aeronca engines and Continental, Franklin, Menasco or Lycoming engines. The engine installed was reflected in the designation using the initial letter as a suffix in the designation.

Aeronca continued development during World War II, introducing the tandem seating Aeronca 7 Champion, taking advantage of the refinements developed with previous versions. The Champion is often regarded as a completely new design, but the influence of the Chief and Tandem is readily apparent. A side-by-side version was also introduced in 1945 as the Aeronca 11 Chief. Military versions of the Aeronca 7 series were operated by the USAF as the Aeronca L-16.

== Operational history ==
Civilian aircraft proved popular as touring aircraft and as trainers. Military aircraft found employment as trainer, liaison, observation aircraft primarily with the USAAF.

== Operators (military) ==
United States

- United States Army Air Forces
- United States Air Force
- United States Navy (XLRN-1)

== Variants ==
Data from:Aerofiles.com

Aeronca CF Scout
(1936) Precursor to the KC Scout, powered by a 40 hp (30 kW) Franklin 4AC. 6 built.

Aeronca K
(1937). A drastic re-design of the Aeronca C using steel tube braced wings in place of king-posts and wire bracing, new undercarriage, enclosed cabin, more powerful engine and many other detail refinements. Initial versions had a door on one side only. Powered by a 42 hp (31 kW) Aeronca E-113. 344 built

Aeronca KC Scout
(1937) detail improvements including doors either side. Powered by a 40 hp (30 kW) Continental A-40. 34 built.

Aeronca KC Sea Scout
Float-plane conversions of the two-door Scout

Aeronca KCA Chief
(1938) Introduced a wider cabin for improved comfort, evolved into the wide-cabin 50C Chief. Powered by a 50 hp (37 kW) Continental A-50. 62 built.

Aeronca KF Chief
(1938) a Franklin engined version of the Model K. Evolved into the 50F Chief. Powered by a 50 hp (37 kW) Franklin 4AC. 5 built.

Aeronca KM Chief
(1938) a Menasco engined version of the Model K. Evolved into the 50M Chief. Powered by a 50 hp (37 kW) Menasco M-50. 9 built.

Aeronca KS Sea Scout
(1937) Production float-plane versions of the Model K. 13 built.

Aeronca 50C Chief
(1938) An improved KCA with a wider cabin, powered by a 50 hp (37 kW) Continental A-50. 248 built. The first light-plane to fly non-stop from Los Angeles to New York City, on 29–30 November 1938, covering 2,785 mi (4,482 km)miles in 30hours 47minutes, averaging 90 mph (145 km/h), with an impressive fuel cost-per-mile of about one cent.

Aeronca 50F Chief
(1938) powered by a 50 hp (37 kW) Franklin 4AC. 40 built.

Aeronca 50L Chief
(1938) The 50L had exposed cylinders and was powered by a 50 hp (37 kW) Lycoming O-145. 65 built.

Aeronca 50LA Chief
The 50LA, with Lycoming engine, had a closed cowling. 20 built.

Aeronca 50M Chief
(1938) A single 50M was built, powered by a 50 hp (37 kW) Menasco M-50.

Aeronca 50TC
(1939) The first tandem Aeronca, introduced as competition for the Piper Cub, powered by a 50 hp (37 kW) Continental A-50. 16 built.

Aeronca 50TL Tandem
The 50TL was powered by a 50 hp (37 kW) Lycoming O-145. 33 built.

Aeronca 60TF
(1940) Essentially the same as the50TC, powered by a 60 hp (45 kW) Franklin 4AC conferring slightly increased performance.

Aeronca 60TL Tandem
Powered by a 60 hp (45 kW) Lycoming O-145. 118 built for the USAAF as the O-58B, powered by a 65 hp (48 kW) Continental A-65.

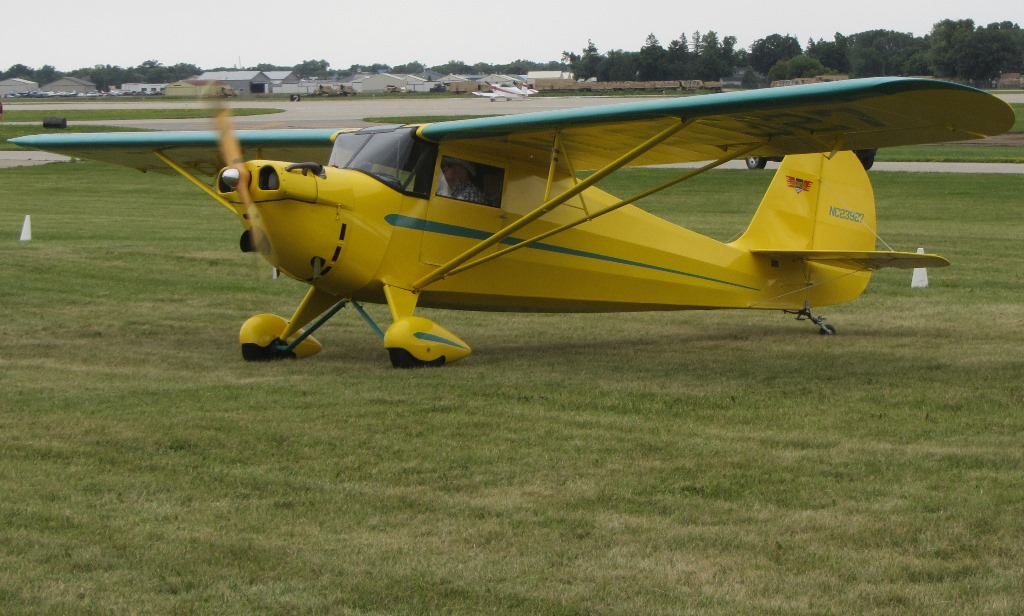
Aeronca 65C

Aeronca 65C Chief
(1938) Powered by a 65 hp (48 kW) Continental A-65. 279 were built, many of which were impressed by the USAAF as O-58/L-3s in 1942.

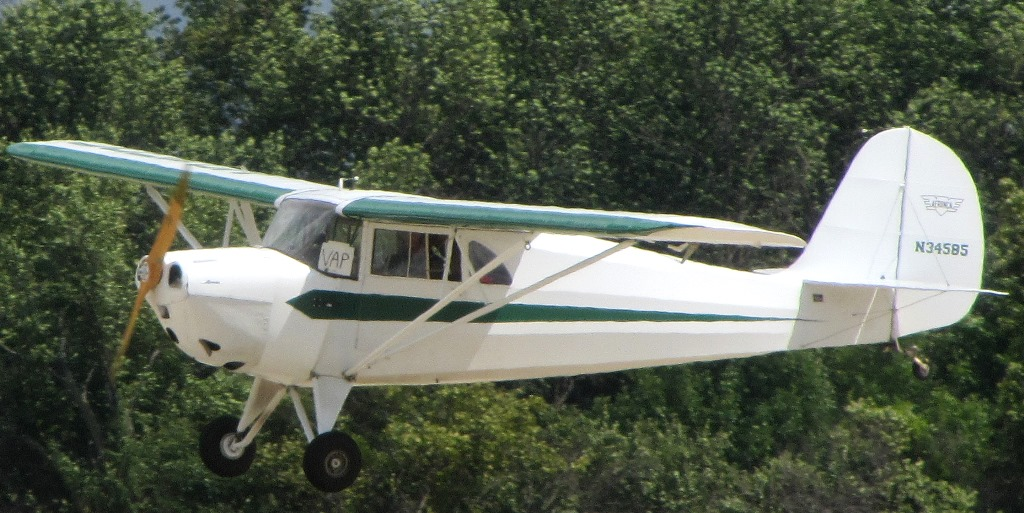
1941 Aeronca 65 CA

Aeronca 65CA Super Chief
The 65C with an optional 8 US gal (30 L) auxiliary fuel tank, and other deluxe appointments. 655 built.

Aeronca 65LA Chief
(1939) Powered by a 65 hp (48 kW) Lycoming O-145. 87 built.

Aeronca 65LB Super Chief
(1940) Powered by a 60 hp (45 kW) Lycoming O-145. 199 built.

Aeronca 65TC Tandem
(1940) Powered by a 65 hp (48 kW) Continental A-65. 112 built.

Aeronca 65TAC Defender
Tandem seating for military training, 154 built.

Aeronca 65TF Tandem
1940) Powered by a 65 hp (48 kW) Franklin 4AC, 59 built.

Aeronca 65TAF Defender
115 built.

Aeronca 65TL Tandem
(1940) Powered by a 65 hp (48 kW) Lycoming O-145. 299 built plus 4 YO-58, 20 O-58, 701 L-3B, and 499 L-3C, plus 253 TG-5 gliders to the USAAF.
Aeronca 65TAL Defender
100 built.

Aeronca 7AC Champion
(1944) The Tandem/Defender re-vitalised for the postwar market, powered by a 65 hp (48 kW) Continental A-65-8, 7,200 were built and aircraft for the USAAF were designated L-16. Revived in 1954 as the Champion Citabria, which later became the Bellanca Citabria.

Aeronca 7ACS Champion
(aka S7AC) Floatplane versions of the 7AC

Aeronca 7BCM Champion
(1947) Powered by an 85 hp (63 kW) Continental C-85-8 and fitted with improved undercarriage, reinforced fuselage, and other refinements. 509 were built, all of which were delivered to the USAAF as Aeronca L-16As.

Aeronca 7CCM Champion
(1948) Powered by a 90 hp (67 kW) Continental C-90-8F (O-205-1), fitted with a larger dorsal fin and wing tanks. 125 civilian models were built. (100 built for the USAAF as the L-16B)

Aeronca 7DC
(1948) Powered by an 85 hp (63 kW) Continental C-85-8, fitted with a dorsal fin and larger tail-plane. 168 built.

Aeronca 7DCM Farm Wagon
The 7DC fitted with a wood-lined cargo bin.

Aeronca 7DCS Champion
The 7DCS (akaS7DC) was the float-plane version with a ventral fin.

Aeronca 7EC Traveller
(1949) Powered by a 90 hp (67 kW) Continental C-90-12F, the first Aeronca offering a starter and a generator. 96 built. Resurrected as the Champion 7EC in 1955.

Aeronca 7ECS Champion
The 7ECS (akaS7EC) was the float-plane version of the 7EC with a ventral fin and floats.

Aeronca 7FC Tri-Traveller
(1949) A single prototype of a 7EC fitted with a Tricycle undercarriage.

Aeronca 11AC Chief
(1945) Powered by a 65 hp (48 kW) Continental A-65, post-war production of the chief with more refined interior and other improvements. 1,862 built. Shares no parts with the previous pre-war Chief, but 70% of parts are shared with the 7 series Champion. Used as the basis for the Hindustan Aeronautics HAL-26 Pushpak trainer in 1958.

Aeronca 11ACS Chief
(aka S11AC), the floatplane version of the 11AC Chief.

Aeronca 11BC Chief
(1945) Powered by an 85 hp (63 kW) Continental C-85-8F. 180 built.

Aeronca 11BCS Chief
Floatplane version of the 11BC

Aeronca 11CC Super Chief
(1948) Powered by an 85 hp (63 kW) Continental C-85-8F, the 11CC introduced a higher gross weight, and wider centre of gravity range. 276 built.

Aeronca 11CCS Super Chief
(akaS11CC), the floatplane version of the 11CC Super Chief.

Aeronca O-58 Grasshopper
(1941) The military version of the Model 65T Tandem with greenhouse cabin and 65 hp (48 kW) YO-170 / O-170-3, similar to civil models. Originally designated in the Observation category, changed to the Liaison category in 1942.

Aeronca L-3
(YO-58 / O-58) 54 built.

Aeronca L-3A
(O-58A) 20 built.

Aeronca L-3B
(O-58B) 875 built.

Aeronca L-3C
With no radio and reduced weight. 490 built.

Aeronca L-3D
Eleven 65TF, with Franklin 4AC-176 engines, impressed into the USAAF.

Aeronca L-3E
Twelve 65TC, with Continental A-65-8 engines, impressed into the USAAF.

Aeronca L-3F
Nineteen Super Chiefs, with Continental A-65-8 engines, impressed into the USAAF.

Aeronca L-3G
Four Super Chiefs, with Lycoming O-145-B1 engines, impressed into the USAAF.

Aeronca L-3H
One 65TL, with Lycoming O-145-B1 engine, impressed into the USAAF.

Aeronca L-3J
One 65TC, with Continental A-65-7 engine, impressed into the USAAF.

Aeronca TG-5
A trainer for glider pilots produced by removing the engine, fairing in the nose and fitting a tow hook for aero-towing. 253 built.

Aeronca TG-33
A single TG-5 converted for prone-pilot tests.

Aeronca XLNR-1
Three TG-5 gliders transferred to the US Navy

Aeronca L-16A
All 509 Aeronca 7BCM aircraft were delivered to the USAAF as the L-16A.

Aeronca L-16B
Production of the 7CCM Champion for the USAF, 100 built as the L-16B

== Aircraft on display ==
- The original prototype 50-C (s/n C-1018) is on display at the New England Air Museum, Bradley International Airport, Windsor Locks, CT.
- There is an Aeronca 65TC on display at the Pacific Aviation Museum in Hawaii that was in the air at the time of the Pearl Harbor attack.

== Specifications (Model 65C Chief) ==
Data from American Planes and Engines for 1940

General characteristics

- Crew: 1
- Capacity: 1 passenger
- Length: 21 ft 1 in (6.43 m)
- Wingspan: 36 ft 0 in (10.97 m)
- Height: 9 ft 0 in (2.74 m)
- Wing area: 169 sq ft (15.7 m^{2})
- Empty weight: 675 lb (306 kg)
- Gross weight: 1,150 lb (522 kg)
- Powerplant: 1 × Continental A-65 four-cylinder, air-cooled horizontally-opposed piston aircraft engine, 65 hp (48 kW)

Performance

- Maximum speed: 105 mph (169 km/h, 91 kn) at sea level
- Cruise speed: 98 mph (158 km/h, 85 kn)
- Stall speed: 35 mph (56 km/h, 30 kn)
- Range: 250 mi (400 km, 220 nmi)
- Service ceiling: 15,000 ft (4,600 m)
- Rate of climb: 650 ft/min (3.3 m/s)

== See also ==
Related development

- Aeronca Chief
- Bellanca Citabria
- Aeronca 50 Chief

Aircraft of comparable role, configuration, and era

- Interstate Cadet
- Luscombe T-8F
- Piper J-3 Cub
- Porterfield 65 Collegiate
- Taylorcraft L-2
- Piper L-4

Related lists

- List of aircraft of World War II
- List of military aircraft of the United States
