= Rich-Twin 1-X-A =

1930s American civil aircraft

1-X-A
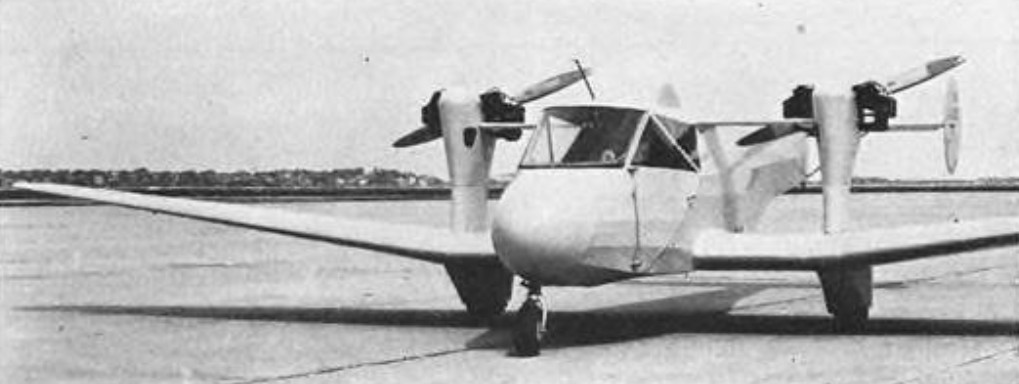
- Front quarter view of the Rich-Twin X-1-A monoplane

General information
- Type: Civil aircraft
- National origin: American
- Manufacturer: Nelson B. Rich Airplane Co.
- Number built: 1
- Registration: NX23001

History
- First flight: April, 1939
- Fate: Retired

The Rich-Twin X-1-A, also known as the X-1-2, was an American two-seater twin-engined pusher monoplane, dating from the late 1930s.

== Design and development ==
The aircraft was designed by Nelson Barnard Rich - an instructor at MIT - and was aimed at the private market. Rich formed the Nelson B. Rich Airplane Corporation to finance its construction and testing. Notable for its twin-pusher configuration, the X-1-A was a low-wing monoplane, with the engines being located within nacelles mounted on pylons above the wing, and which were braced to the fuselage by horizontal struts. The aircraft was otherwise of conventional configuration and construction, being built from steel and wood, and with the wing being built primarily of plywood. There was a tricycle landing gear, with the rear two wheels able to be semi-retracted within faired spats. The empennage featured twin fins and rudders, selected so that they would operate in the propwash of the propellers.

The aircraft was initially fitted with two 50 hp (37 kW) Lycoming engines, but these were later replaced with 75 hp (56 kW) Lycoming GO-145 engines.

== Operational history ==
The X-1-A first flew in April 1939, and was given the registration NZ23001. In September 1939, it was flown to Cleveland, Ohio and was displayed at that year's National Air Race.

The 1941 edition of Jane's All The World's Aircraft reported that, due to the American war effort, that the aircraft was unlikely to go into production, however a four-seat version was to be developed and manufactured "at a later date".

== Specifications ==
Data from Jane's All The World's Aircraft 1941

General characteristics

- Crew: 1
- Capacity: 2
- Length: 22 ft (6.7 m)
- Wingspan: 35 ft (11 m)
- Height: 6 ft 8 in (2.03 m)
- Wing area: 140 sq ft (13 m^{2})
- Empty weight: 1,000 lb (454 kg)
- Gross weight: 1,600 lb (726 kg)
- Powerplant: 2 × Lycoming GO-145 four-cylinder, 75 hp (56 kW) each
- Propellers: 2-bladed

Performance

- Maximum speed: 135 mph (217 km/h, 117 kn)
- Cruise speed: 115 mph (185 km/h, 100 kn)
- Stall speed: 48 mph (77 km/h, 42 kn)
- Wing loading: 11.5 lb/sq ft (56 kg/m^{2})

== See also ==
Aircraft of comparable role, configuration, and era

- Carden-Baynes Bee
