= Menasco M-50 =

1930s American aircraft piston engine

M-50
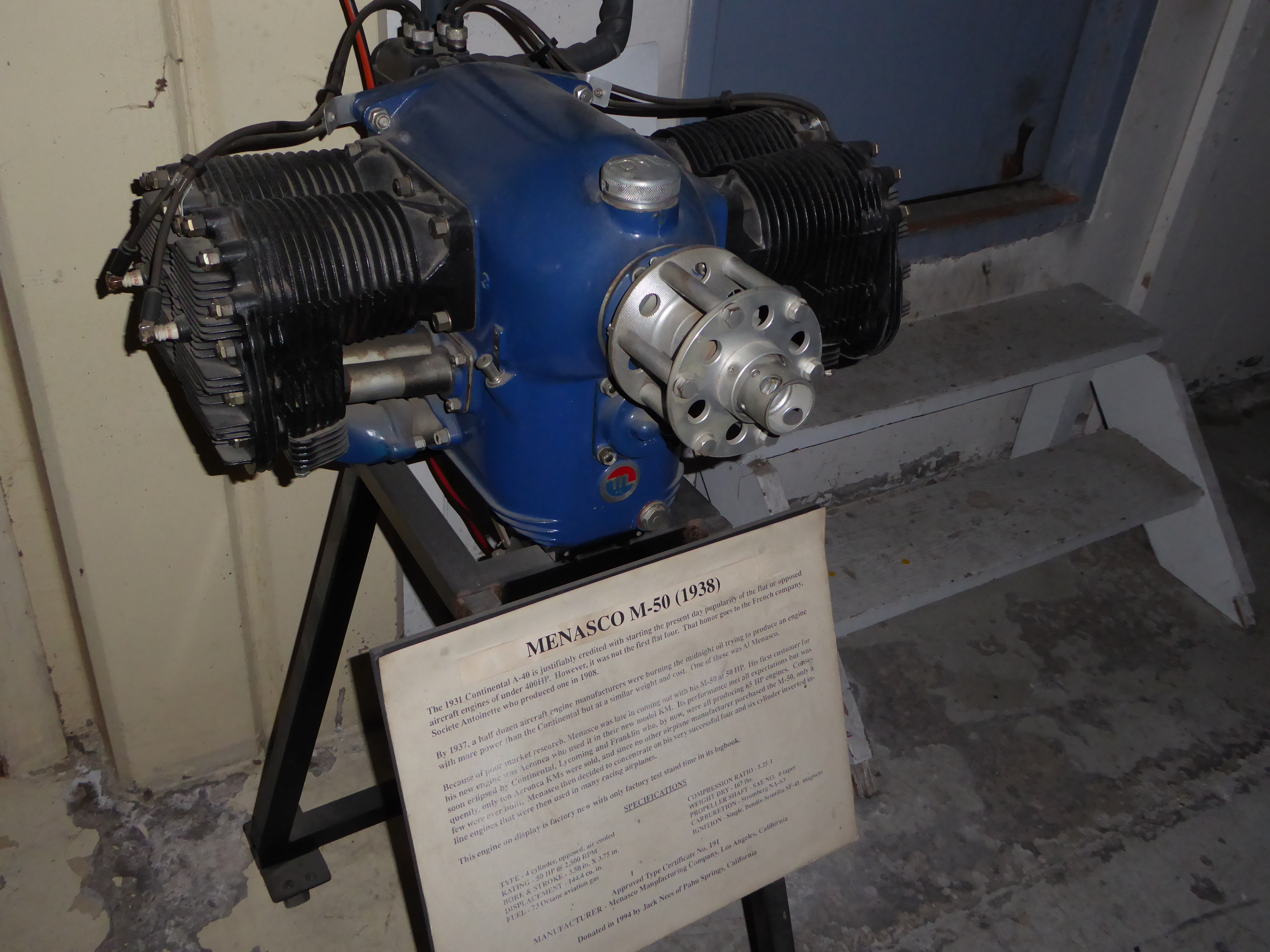
- Menasco M-50 aircraft engine at the San Diego Air & Space Museum
- Type: Piston aero-engine
- National origin: United States
- Manufacturer: Menasco Motors Company
- Major applications: Aeronca KM

The Menasco M-50 was an American four-cylinder horizontally opposed aircraft engine.

== Design and development ==
The engine was developed from 1937-1938 for use in Aeronca model KM light aircraft. Despite there being a deal for an estimated 500 Menasco M50 engines, only 10 engines were delivered as the deal broke down. Despite being initially being designed for aircraft usage, M-50 engines were also used to power midget race cars in Los Angeles. The failure of the engine in the market could be attributed towards the late entry for the engine into the market meant that the engine was soon overshadowed by more technologically advanced engines developed by its competitors such as the 65 hp (48 kW) flat-four engines from Continental and Franklin.

== Applications ==
- Aeronca KM

== Specifications ==
Data from FAA TCDS.

=== General characteristics ===
- Type: Four-cylinder horizontally-opposed piston engine
- Bore: 3.5 in (88.9 mm)
- Stroke: 3.75 inches (95.3 mm)
- Displacement: 144.4 cu in (2.37 L)
- Dry weight: 167 lb (76 kg)

=== Components ===
- Fuel system: Stromberg carburetor
- Fuel type: 73 octane gasoline
- Cooling system: Air-cooled
- Reduction gear: Direct drive
- Ignition system: Bendix-Scintilla magneto

=== Performance ===
- Power output: 50 hp (37 kW) at 2,500 rpm
- Compression ratio: 5.25:1

== See also ==
Comparable engines

- Continental A40

Related lists

- List of aircraft engines
