= La Victoria de Chacabuco Airport =

- IATA: none; ICAO: SCVH

Summary
- Airport type: Public
- Serves: Chacabuco Province, Chile
- Elevation AMSL: 2,139 ft / 652 m
- Coordinates: 33°03′00″S 70°42′30″W

Map
- Location of La Victoria de Chacabuco Airport in Chile

Runways
Direction	Length		Surface
Direction	m	ft	Surface
03/21	1,000	3,281	Asphalt
- Source: Landings.com Google Maps GCM

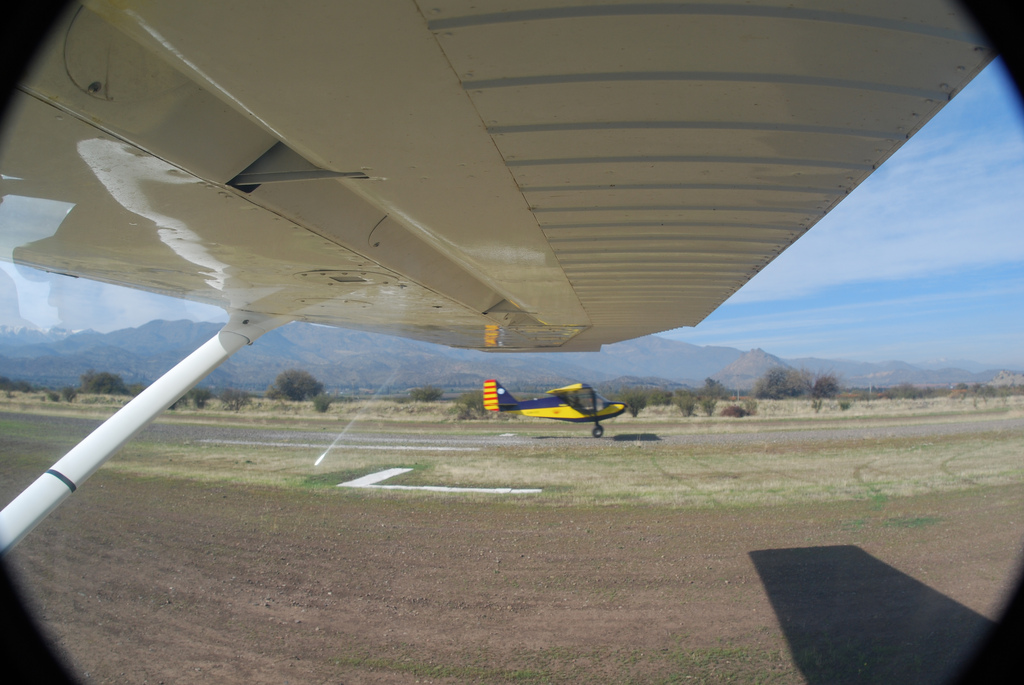
A Cessna 172 waits while an ultralight aircraft lands on runway 21 in La Victoria de Chacabuco (SCVH)

La Victoria de Chacabuco Airport (ICAO: SCVH) is an airport serving Chacabuco Province in the Santiago Metropolitan Region of Chile. It is between the villages of El Colorado and Casas de Chacabuco, 47 kilometres (29 mi) north of Santiago city.

The airport is in a broad valley with distant mountainous terrain in all quadrants. Runway 21 has an additional 80 metres (260 ft) displaced threshold.

== See also ==
- Transport in Chile
- List of airports in Chile
