= Aeronca 50 Chief =

1938 American utility aircraft

Models 50 and 65
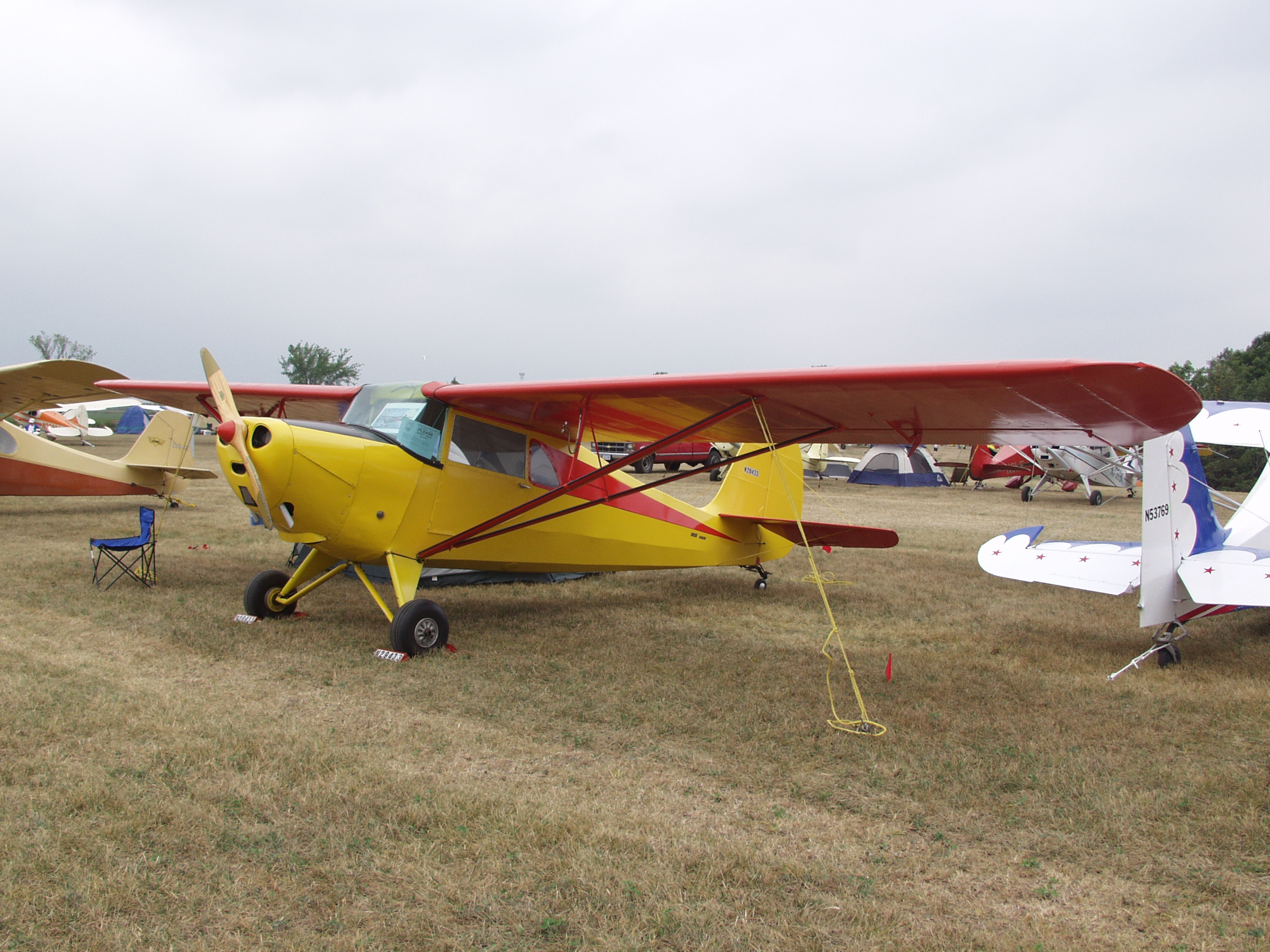
- Model 65-CA

General information
- Type: Civil utility aircraft
- Manufacturer: Aeronca

History
- First flight: 1938

The Aeronca Model 50 Chief is an American light plane of the late 1930s. Consumer demand for more comfort, longer range and better instrumentation resulted in its development in 1938, powered by a 50-horsepower (37-kilowatt) Continental, Franklin or Lycoming engine. A 65-horsepower (48-kilowatt) Continental engine powered the Model 65 Super Chief, which was also built in a flight trainer version, the Model TC-65 Defender, with its rear seat positioned nine inches (23 centimeters) higher than the front for better visibility.

== Variants ==
Aeronca 50C Chief
1938 model. An improved KCA with enlarged wings and a wider cabin, powered by a 50 hp (37 kW) Continental A-50. 248 built. A 50C made the first non-stop flight by a lightplane between Los Angeles to New York City, on November 29–30, 1938, taking 30 hours 47 minutes to travel 2,785 mi (4,482 km), at an average speed of 90 mph (145 km/h).
Aeronca 50F Chief
1938 version of 50C powered by a 50 hp (37 kW) Franklin 4AC-150. 36–40 built.
Aeronca 50L Chief
Late 1938 version of 50 powered by a 50 hp (37 kW) Lycoming O-145-A1 engine, which had exposed cylinder heads. Could be fitted with EDO floats. 65 built.
Aeronca 50LA Chief
Improved 1939 derivative of 50L, with fully-closed cowling. Could be fitted with EDO floats. 20 built.
Aeronca 50M Chief
1938 model of 50 Chief powered by a 50 hp (37 kW) Menasco M-50 engine. One built, which was later converted to serve as prototype of 50F and 50L
Aeronca 50TC Tandem Trainer
1940 tandem trainer intended for Civilian Pilot Training Program and powered by 50 hp (37 kW) Continental A-50-7. 16 built.
Aeronca 50TL Tandem Trainer
Tandem trainer powered by 50 hp (37 kW) Lycoming O-145-A1. 33 built.
Aeronca 50TF
Proposed version of Tandem Trainer powered by 50 hp (37 kW) Franklin 4AC-150. Unbuilt.
Aeronca 60TF
Proposed Tandem Trainer with 60 hp (45 kW) Franklin 4AC-171. Unbuilt.
Aeronca 60TL Tandem
Powered by a 60 hp (45 kW) Lycoming O-145. 118 built for the USAAF as the O-58B, powered by a 65 hp (48 kW) Continental A-65.

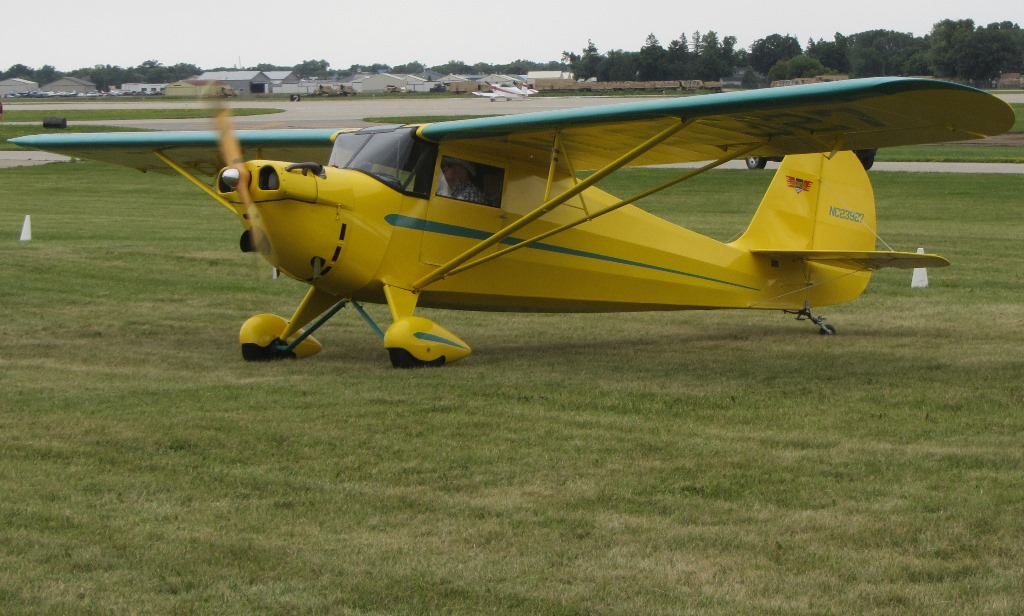
Aeronca 65C

Aeronca 65C Super Chief
Improved, 1939, derivative of 50C Chief, powered by a 65 hp (48 kW) Continental A-65. 279 were built.

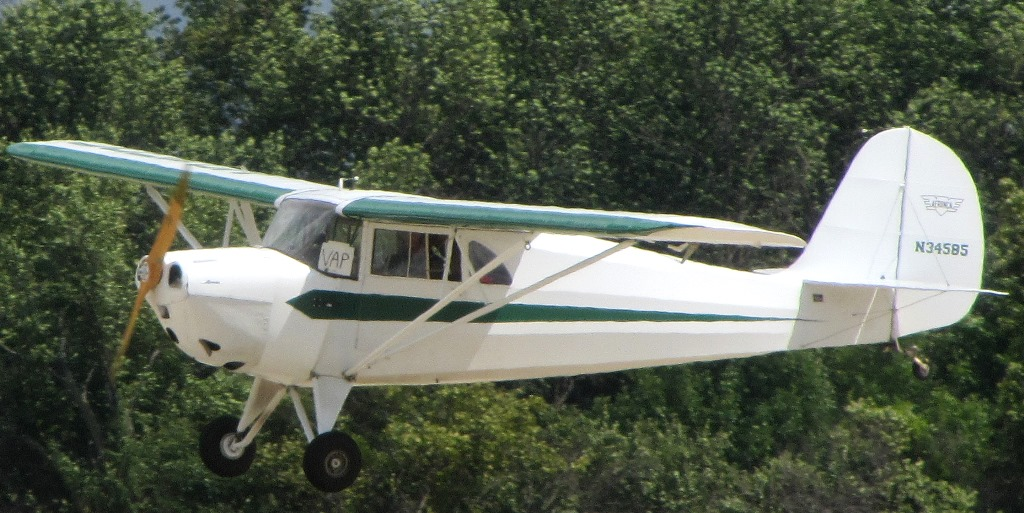
1941 Aeronca 65 CA

Aeronca 65CA Super Chief
1941 derivative of 65C with more fuel and entry door on each side of fuselage (other models had a standard fit of one door on the starboard side, although the second door could be fitted as an optional extra. 655 built.
Aeronca 65LA Super Chief
1939 model powered by 65 hp (48 kW) Lycoming O-145-B1. 87 built.
Aeronca 65LB Super Chief
1940 model with 65 hp (48 kW) Lycoming O-145-B2. 199 built.
Aeronca 65TC Tandem
(1940) Powered by a 65 hp (48 kW) Continental A-65. 112 built.
Aeronca 65TAC Defender
Tandem seating for military training, 154 built.
Aeronca 65TF Tandem
1940) Powered by a 65 hp (48 kW) Franklin 4AC, 59 built.
Aeronca 65TAF Defender
115 built.
Aeronca 65TL Tandem
(1940) Powered by a 65 hp (48 kW) Lycoming O-145. 299 built plus 4 YO-58, 20 O-58, 701 L-3B, and 499 L-3C, plus 253 TG-5 gliders to the USAAF.
Aeronca 65TAL Defender
100 built.

== Specifications (Model 50-C Chief) ==
Data from American Planes and Engines for 1939

General characteristics

- Crew: 1
- Capacity: 1 passenger
- Length: 21 ft 1 in (6.43 m)
- Wingspan: 36 ft 0 in (10.97 m)
- Height: 6 ft 3 in (1.91 m)
- Wing area: 169 sq ft (15.7 m^{2})
- Airfoil: Clark Y
- Empty weight: 669 lb (303 kg)
- Gross weight: 1,130 lb (513 kg)
- Fuel capacity: 12 US gal (10.0 imp gal; 45 L)
- Powerplant: 1 × Continental A50 air-cooled flat-four piston engine, 50 hp (37 kW)

Performance

- Maximum speed: 100 mph (160 km/h, 87 kn) at sea level
- Cruise speed: 90 mph (140 km/h, 78 kn)
- Stall speed: 35 mph (56 km/h, 30 kn)
- Range: 250 mi (400 km, 220 nmi)
- Service ceiling: 14,000 ft (4,300 m)
- Rate of climb: 550 ft/min (2.8 m/s)

== See also ==
- Aeronca Chief family
