= Lycoming O-145 =

Family of small, low-horsepower, four-cylinder, air-cooled engines

O-145
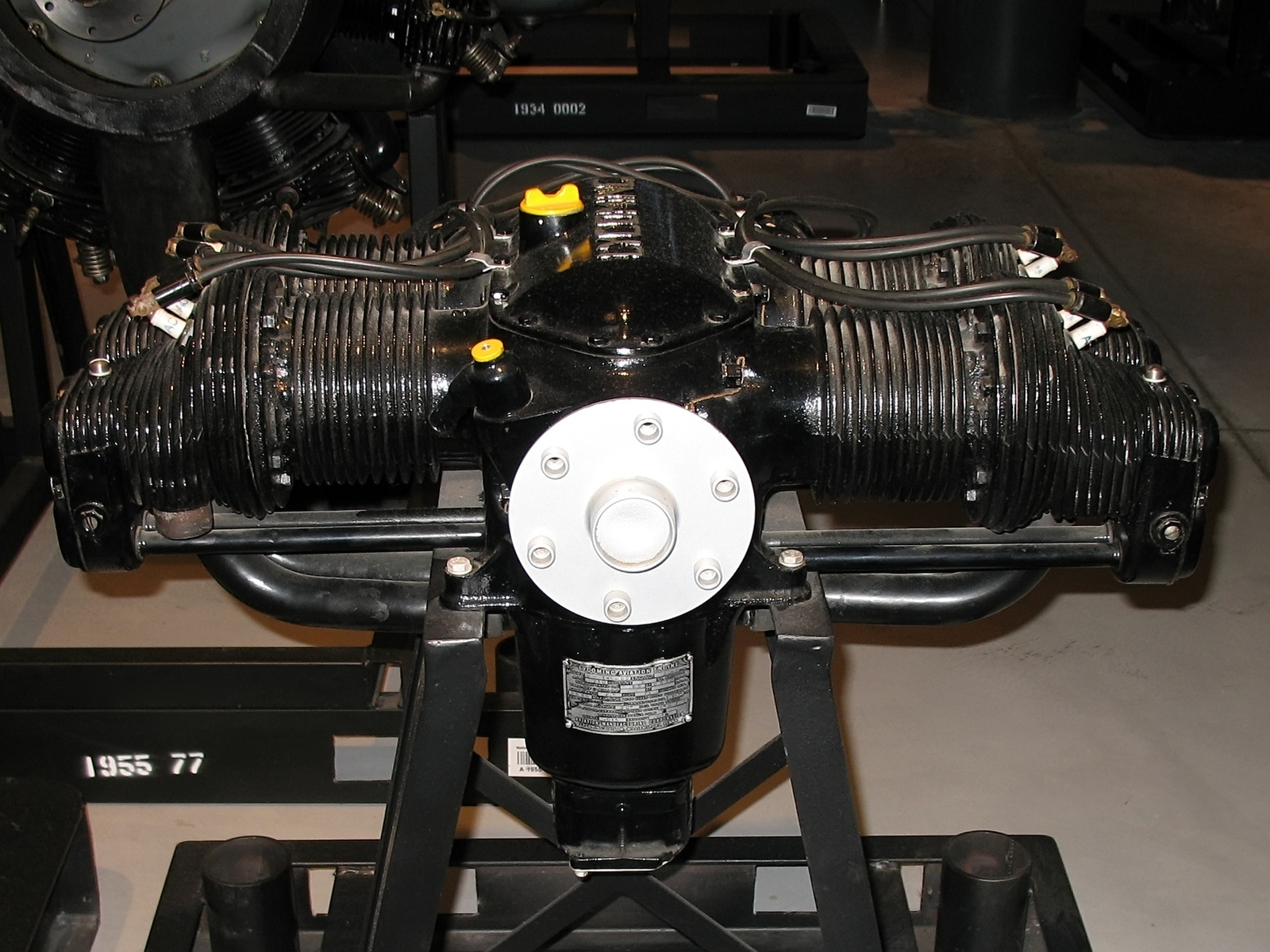
- Preserved Lycoming O-145
- Type: Piston aero-engine
- National origin: United States
- Manufacturer: Lycoming Engines
- First run: 1933
- Major applications: Piper J-3 Cub; Piper J-5; Piper PA-15 Vagabond; Aeronca Chief family
- Manufactured: 1938–1949
- Developed into: Lycoming O-233; Lycoming O-235

The Lycoming O-145 is a family of small, low-horsepower, four-cylinder, air-cooled engines. It was Lycoming Engines' first horizontally opposed aircraft engine and was produced from 1938 until the late 1940s. The family includes the reduction-geared GO-145. The O-145 received its Approved Type Certificate on 13 Jun 1938.

== Design and development ==
The O-145 was produced in three major versions, the O-145-A rated at 55 hp (41 kW), the -B rated at 65 hp (48 kW), and -C rated at 75 hp (56 kW). The "B" model was the major production model, with the "A" and "C" produced in much smaller quantities.

All models of the series had the same bore, stroke, and displacement, additional horsepower being generated by increasing compression ratio and maximum rpm. All use a Stromberg NA-S2 or NA-S2A or Marvel MA-2 or MA-2-A carburetor. The dual ignition versions use two Scintilla SF-4L, SN4LN-20 or -21, Superior SMA-4 or Edison-Splitdorf RMA-4 magnetos.

The original O-145-A produced 55 hp (41 kW) at 2300 rpm, weighed 165.5 lb (75 kg), and featured single ignition. In an attempt to compete with the Continental A-65, Lycoming boosted the rpm and power output to 65 hp (48 kW) at 2550 rpm, and finally 75 hp (56 kW) at 3100 rpm. The O-145 had a hard time competing with the same horsepower Continentals due to its smaller displacement, which resulted in a steeper torque curve.

The GO-145 is a geared model, introduced in 1938, that uses a 27:17 reduction ratio (1.59:1) gearbox to produce 75 hp (56 kW) at 3200 crankshaft rpm, giving 2013 propeller rpm. The engine employs a gearbox bolted to the front of the engine and the resulting engine weighs 193 lb (88 kg) without starter or generator. The GO-145 suffered from a poor reputation for reliability, because pilots mis-handled the engine, running it at too low a cruising rpm and causing gearbox wear as a result.

The series' type certificate expired on 2 November 1950 and no O-145-B1 or -C1 or GO-145-C1s engines produced after 1 August 1941 and O-145-B2, -B3 or -C2, or GO-145-C2 or -C3s produced after 24 August 1949 are eligible for certification. The single ignition O-145-A series, O-145-B1, and -C1 are not covered by the original type certificate.

Lycoming ended production of the O-145 and replaced it with the O-235 series.

== Variants ==
O-145-A
Four-cylinder, direct drive, 55 hp (41 kW), single ignition
O-145-A3
Four-cylinder, direct drive, 55 hp (41 kW), single ignition, with starter and generator installed

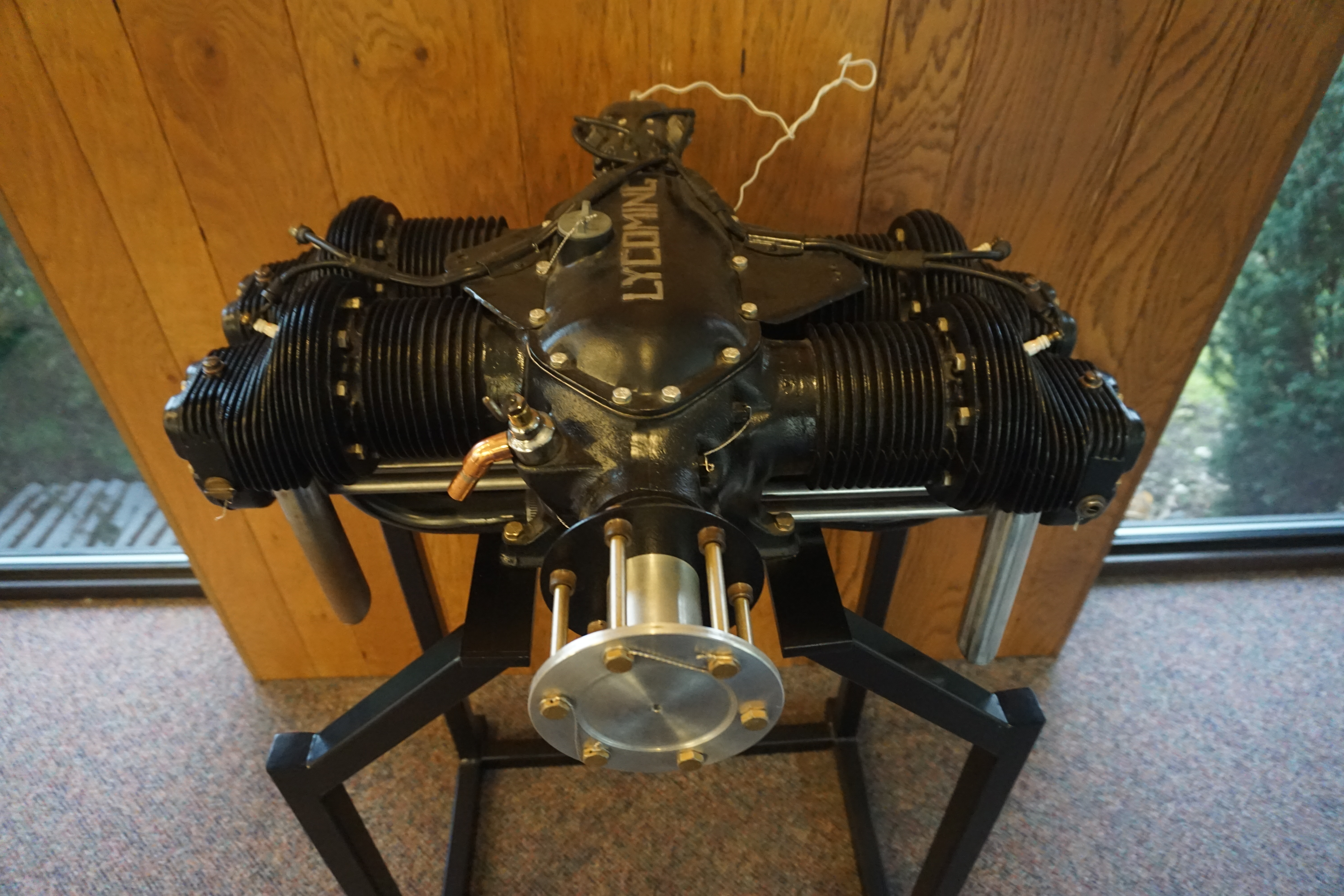
O-145-B on display at the Air Zoo

O-145-B1
Four-cylinder, direct drive, 65 hp (48 kW) at 2550 rpm, single ignition, 155 lb
O-145-B2
Four-cylinder, direct drive, 65 hp (48 kW) at 2550 rpm, dual ignition, 166 lb
O-145-B3
Four-cylinder, direct drive, 65 hp (48 kW) at 2550 rpm, dual ignition, 169 lb
O-145-C1
Four-cylinder, direct drive, 75 hp (56 kW) at 3100 rpm, single ignition, 155 lb
O-145-C2
Four-cylinder, direct drive, 75 hp (56 kW) at 3100 rpm, dual ignition, 166 lb
GO-145-C1
Four-cylinder, reduction gearbox, 75 hp (56 kW) at 3200 rpm, single ignition, 182 lb
GO-145-C2
Four-cylinder, reduction gearbox, 75 hp (56 kW) at 3200 rpm, dual ignition, 193 lb
GO-145-C3
Four-cylinder, reduction gearbox, 75 hp (56 kW) at 3200 rpm, dual ignition, 195 lb

== Applications ==
O-145

- Aeronca Chief 50L, 50LA, 65LA
- Aeronca Super Chief 65LB
- Aeronca Tandem 50TL, 60TL, 65TL
- Airdrome Fokker D-VIII
- Luscombe 8B
- Mooney Mite M-18L
- Piper J-3L Cub, most often the 65 hp version
- Piper J-4F Cub Coupe
- Piper PA-8 Skycycle
- Carlson Skycycle
- Piper PA-15 Vagabond
- Porterfield Collegiate LP-50, LP-55, LP-65
- Taylorcraft BL series (BL-50, BL-65, BL-12-65, etc.)
- Taylorcraft DL
- Taylorcraft Plus C

GO-145

- Piper J-5B Cub Cruiser
- Funk B75L
- General Skyfarer
- Rich-Twin 1-X-A
- Shirlen Big Cootie
- Stinson 10B Voyager

== Specifications (GO-145-C2) ==
Data from Type Certificate 210

=== General characteristics ===
- Type: Four-cylinder, reduction-geared engine
- Bore: 3.625 in (92 mm)
- Stroke: 3.500 in (89 mm)
- Displacement: 144.5 in³ (2.4 L)
- Dry weight: 193 lb (87.5 kg)

=== Components ===
- Fuel system: Stromberg NA-S2 or NA-S2A or Marvel MA-2 or MA-2-A carburetor
- Fuel type: minimum 73 octane
- Cooling system: air-cooled

=== Performance ===
- Power output: 75 hp at 3200 rpm (56 kW)
- Specific power: 0.52 hp/in³ (23.3 kW/L)
- Compression ratio: 6.5:1
- Power-to-weight ratio: 0.39 hp/lb (0.64 kW/kg)

== See also ==
Comparable engines

- Continental O-170
- Franklin O-150

Related lists

- List of aircraft engines
