= Mid America Flight Museum =

- Location within Texas
- Established: 2013
- Location: Mount Pleasant, Texas
- Coordinates: 33.101°N 94.965°W
- Type: Aviation museum
- Founder: Scott Glover
- Website: www.midamericaflightmuseum.com

The Mid America Flight Museum is an aviation museum located at the Mount Pleasant Regional Airport in Mount Pleasant, Texas.

== History ==
Scott Glover, the founder of Mid America Pet Food, began collecting airplanes in 1996. After 17 years, he established the museum in 2013.

The museum worked with Dynamic Aviation to restore the Lockheed Constellation Columbine II to flight in 2015.

The museum purchased the B-17 Thunderbird from the Lone Star Flight Museum in 2020. It was ferried to the Erickson Aircraft Collection in Madras, Oregon for an inspection shortly thereafter.

== Facilities ==
The museum has two locations: Mid America South, the main museum, at the Mount Pleasant Regional Airport in Mount Pleasant, Texas and Mid America North, a restoration shop, at Grimes Field in Urbana, Ohio.

== Collection ==
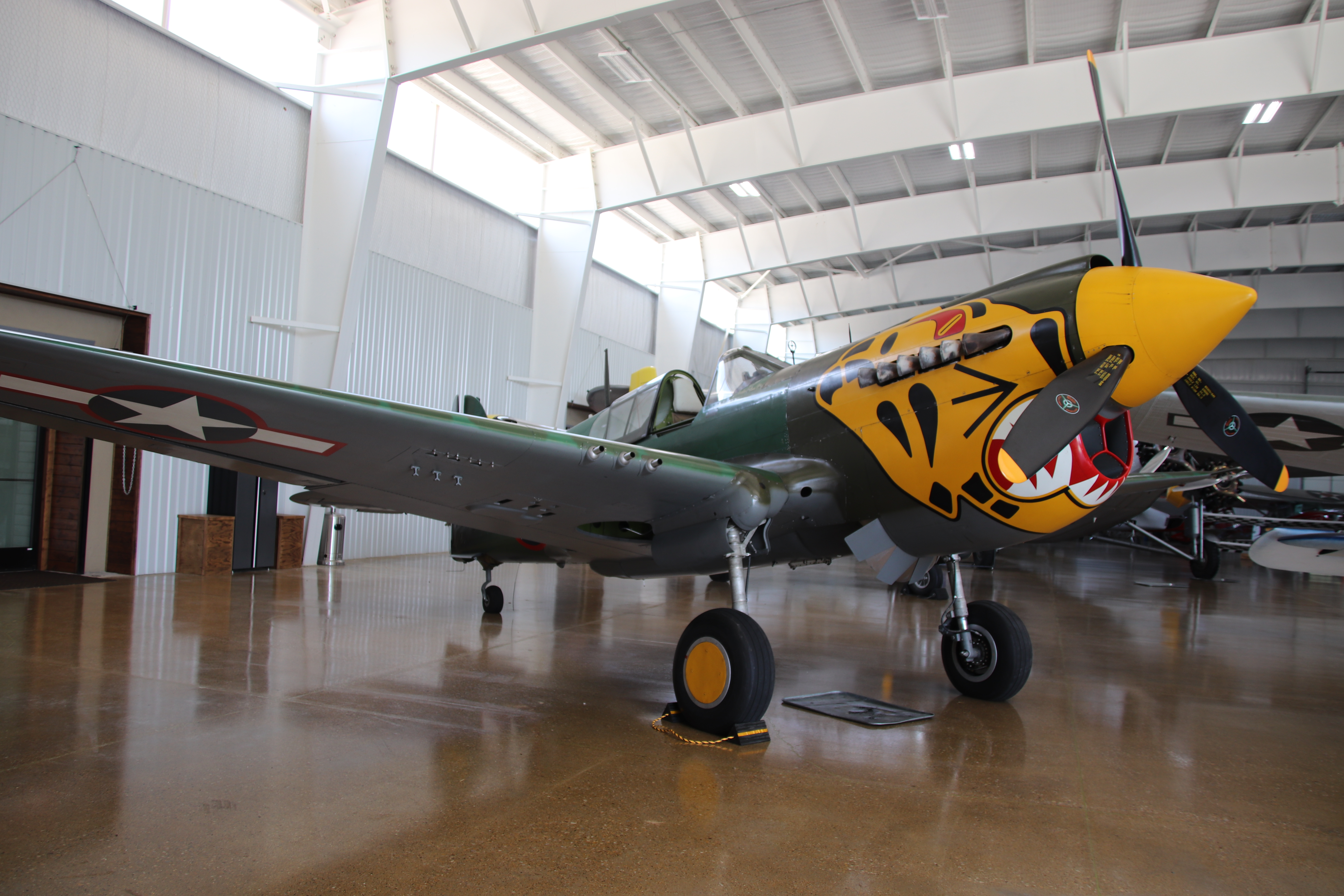
Curtiss P-40K Warhawk

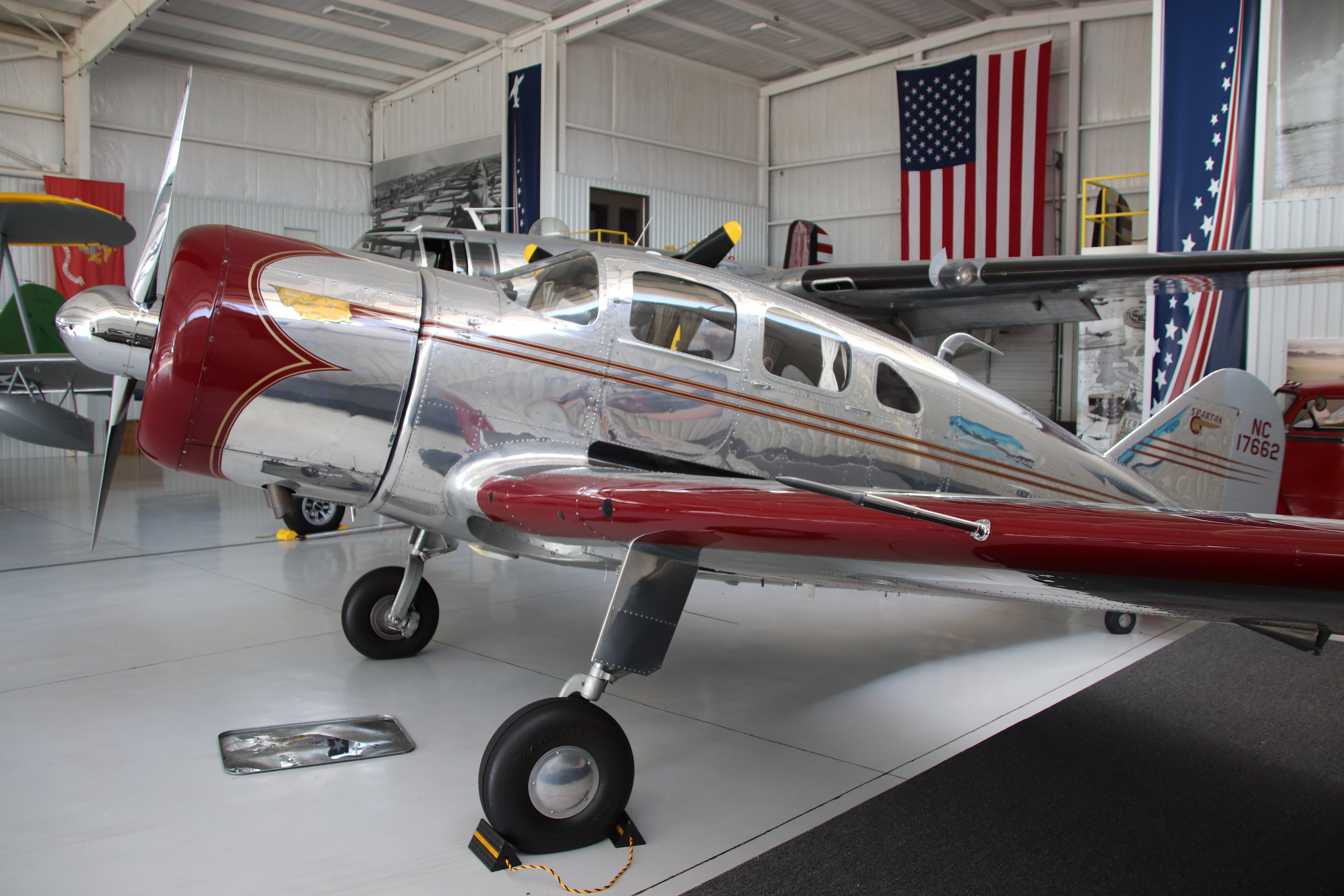
Spartan 7W Executive

- Antonov An-2
- Beechcraft 18
- Beechcraft T-34C Turbo-Mentor
- Beechcraft T-34C Turbo-Mentor
- Beechcraft T-34C Turbo-Mentor
- Beechcraft T-34C Turbo-Mentor
- Beechcraft T-34C Turbo-Mentor
- Beechcraft T-34C Turbo-Mentor
- Bell 47
- Bell AH-1 Cobra
- Bell UH-1H Iroquois
- Boeing B-17G Flying Fortress
- Boeing PT-17 Kaydet
- Cessna C-165 Airmaster
- Cessna L-19 Bird Dog
- Cessna O-2 Skymaster
- Cessna T-50
- Curtiss P-40K Warhawk
- Curtiss Robin
- de Havilland DH.89A Dragon Rapide
- Douglas A-26B Invader
- Douglas C-41
- Douglas C-47 Skytrain
- Fairchild 22
- Fairchild 71
- Ford 4-AT-E Trimotor
- General Motors FM-2 Wildcat
- General Motors TBM-3E Avenger
- Goodyear FG-1D Corsair
- Granville Gee Bee R-6 "Q.E.D." – replica
- Grumman HU-16B Albatross
- Grumman J2F-4 Duck
- Hawker Sea Fury F.10
- Howard 250
- Howard DGA-11
- Hughes 369
- Lockheed DL-1B Vega
- Lockheed C-60A Lodestar
- New Standard D-25A
- North American TB-25N Mitchell
- North American TF-51D Mustang
- North American SNJ-3
- North American T-28A Trojan
- On Mark Marketeer
- Paramount Cabinaire
- Piper PA-12 Super Cruiser
- Piper PA-23 Apache
- Piper PA-23 Apache
- Ryan S-C-W
- Spartan 7W Executive
- Stearman C3R
- Stinson A
- Stinson SM-8A
- Stinson SM-6000-B
- Stinson SR-9F
- Stout Bushmaster 2000
- Taylor E-2
- Travel Air 4000
- Travel Air 6000
- Travel Air 6000
- Van's RV-3
- Waco 9
- Waco CTO
- Waco UPF-7

== See also ==
- List of aviation museums
