= Pasped Skylark =

American aircraft

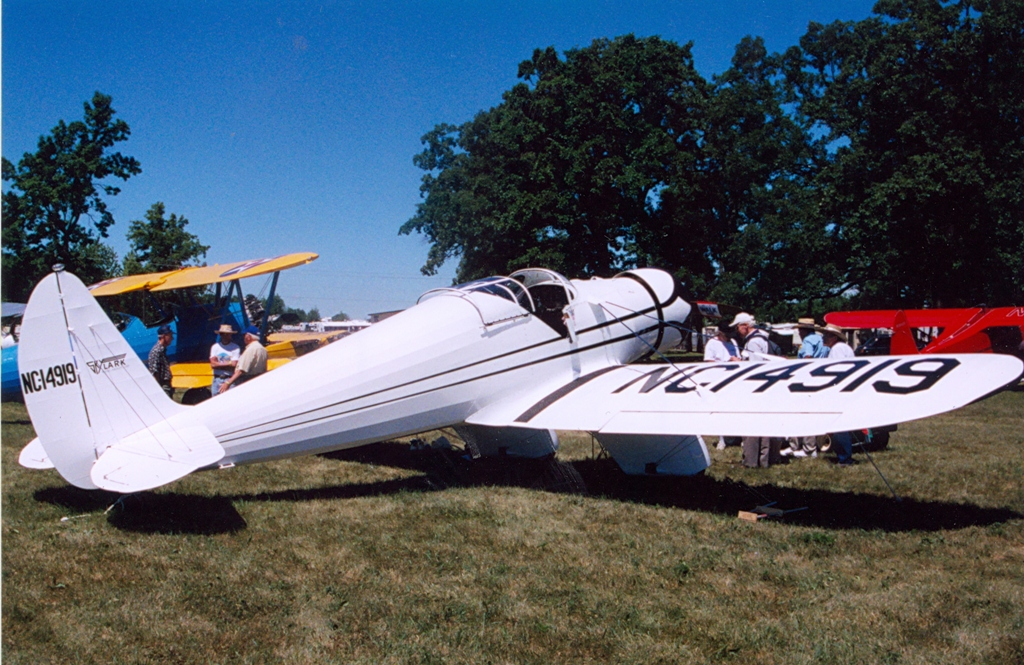

General information
- Type: Two-seat cabin monoplane
- National origin: United States
- Manufacturer: Pasped Aircraft Company
- Status: airworthy in 2010
- Primary user: private pilot owner
- Number built: 1

History
- First flight: 1935

The Pasped W-1 Skylark is a 1930s American two-seat single-engined cabin monoplane designed and built by the Pasped Aircraft Company of Glendale, California.

== Design and development ==
The Skylark is a braced low-wing monoplane with a fixed tailwheel landing gear. It is powered by a 125 hp (93 kW) Warner Scarab radial engine. The enclosed cockpit has side-by-side seating for two. It has a welded steel fuselage and wooden wings. With other two-seat aircraft of the era having a better performance on smaller engines the Skylark did not enter production. The sole example was currently airworthy in February 2010 with an owner in Versailles, Missouri.

== Specifications ==
Data from and

General characteristics

- Crew: 2
- Length: 25 ft 0 in (7.62 m)
- Wingspan: 35 ft 11 in (10.95 m)
- Height: 7 ft 11 in (2.41 m)
- Wing area: 187 sq ft (17.4 m^{2})
- Empty weight: 1,288 lb (584 kg)
- Max takeoff weight: 1,885 lb (855 kg)
- Powerplant: 1 × Warner Scarab radial engine, 125 hp (93 kW)

Performance

- Maximum speed: 139 mph (224 km/h, 121 kn)
- Cruise speed: 125 mph (201 km/h, 109 kn)
- Minimum control speed: 35 mph (56 km/h, 30 kn)
- Range: 475 mi (764 km, 413 nmi)
- Service ceiling: 16,000 ft (4,900 m)
- Rate of climb: 850 ft/min (4.3 m/s)

== See also ==
Aircraft of comparable role, configuration, and era

- Kinner Sportwing
