= Warner Scarab =

American aircraft engine

Scarab
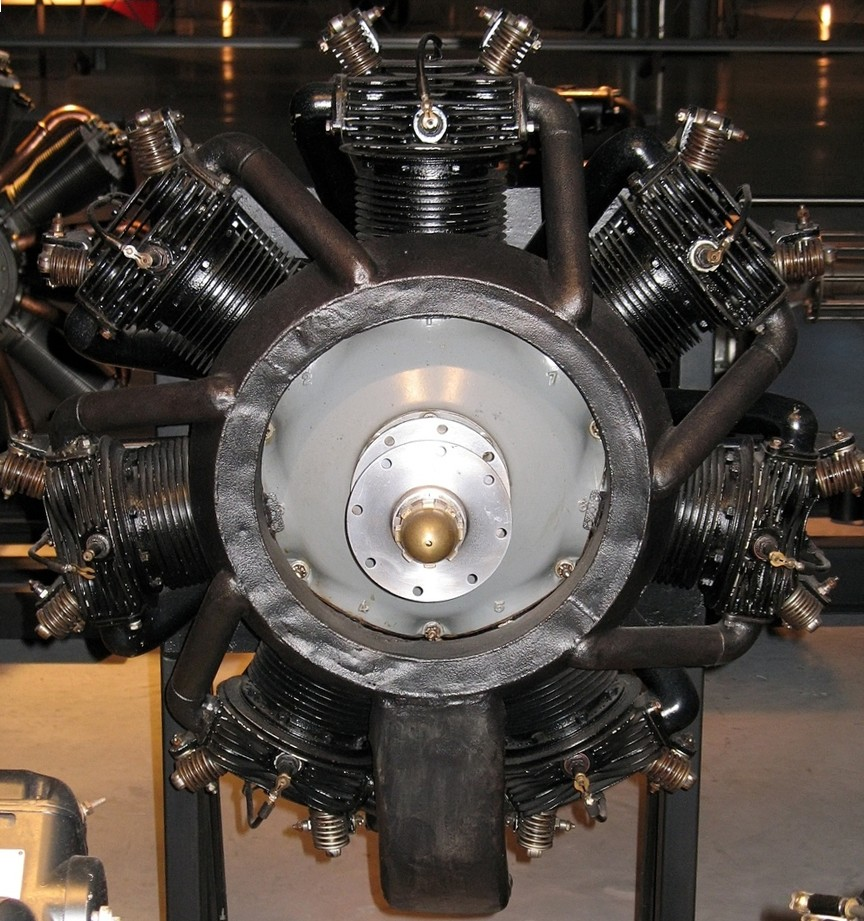
- Preserved Warner Scarab
- Type: Radial engine
- Manufacturer: Warner Aircraft Corporation
- First run: November 1927

The Warner Scarab is an American seven-cylinder radial aircraft engine, that was manufactured by the Warner Aircraft Corporation of Detroit, Michigan in 1928 through to the early 1940s. In military service the engine was designated R-420.

== Variants ==
Scarab S-50
A 7-cyl. air-cooled radial engine introduced in 1928. With a bore and stroke of 4.25 inches and a compression ratio of 5.2:1, the Scarab developed 125 hp (93 kW) at 2,050 rpm from 422 cu in (7 L) with a dry weight of 285 lb (129 kg).
Scarab Junior
A 5-cyl. version introduced in 1930 developing 90 hp (67 kW) at 2,125 rpm from 301 cu in (5 L) with a dry weight of 230 lb (104 kg).

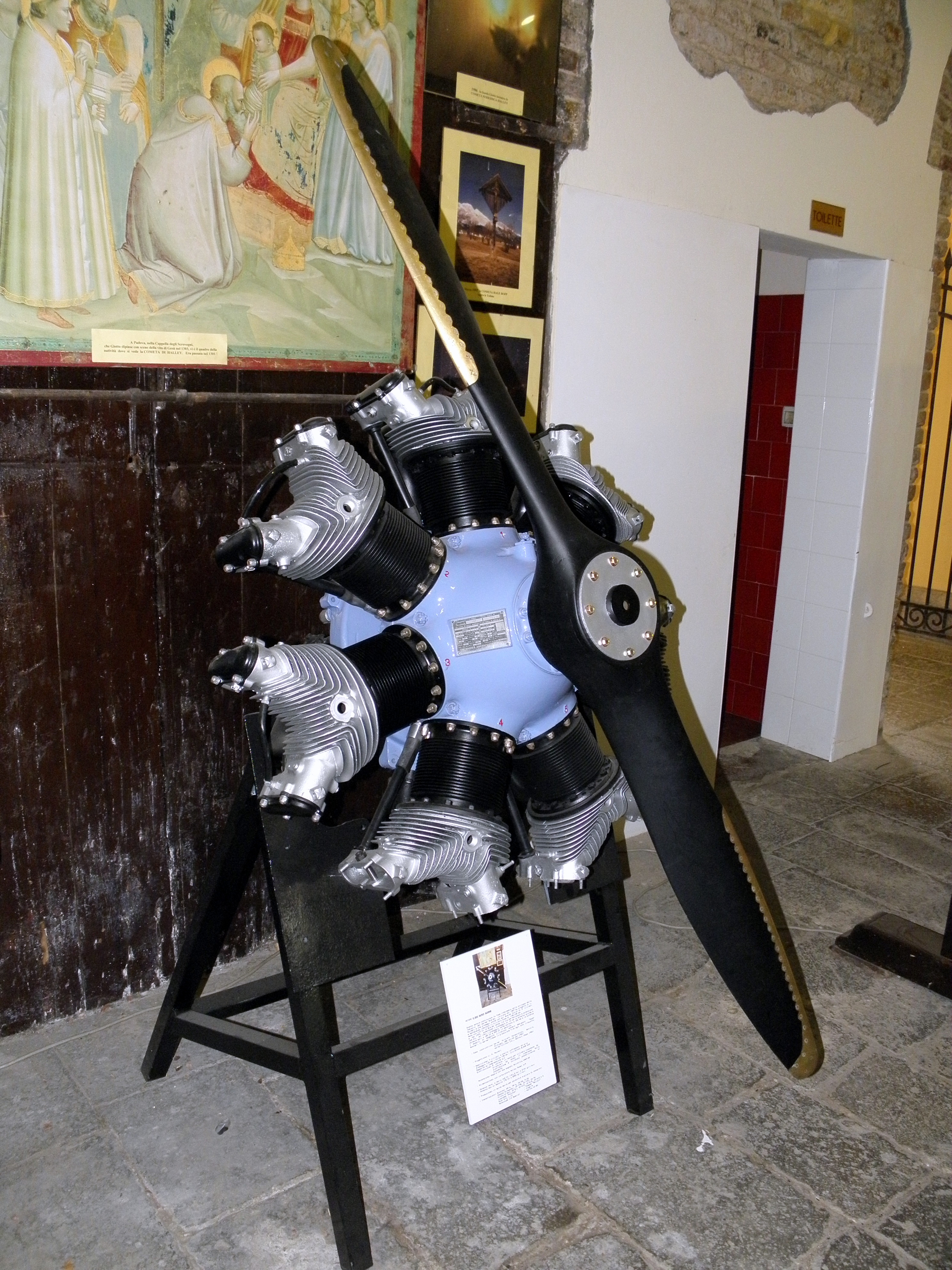
The R-500-7 Super Scarab model 165 displayed at Museo dell'Aria e dello Spazio in San Pelagio, Due Carrare, Province of Padua.

Super Scarab SS-50/50A
Increased cylinder bore to 4.625 inches to develop 145 hp (108 kW) at 2,050 rpm from 499 cu in (8 L) with a dry weight of 303 lb (137 kg).
Super Scarab SS-165
Increased compression ratio from 5.2:1 to 6.4:1 to develop 165 hp (123 kW) at 2,100 rpm with a dry weight of 341 lb (155 kg).
Super Scarab SS-185
Increased cylinder bore to 4.875 inches, developing 185 hp (138 kW) at 2175 rpm from 555 cu in (9 L), with a dry weight of 344 lb (156 kg).
R-420
Military designation of the Scarab.
R-500
Military designation of the Super Scarab 165.
R-550
Military designation of the Super Scarab 185.
145
Alternative designation for the Warner Super Scarab SS-50/50A .
165
Alternative designation for the Warner Super Scarab 165 .
185
Alternative designation for the Warner Super Scarab 185 (Primarily a helicopter application).

== Applications ==
Among the many uses for the Scarab, the engine was fitted to the Cessna Airmaster and the Fairchild 24 (UC-61 or Argus). Notably, in 1942, it was put into use powering the Sikorsky R-4, the first helicopter to be put into production.

Many of these reliable engines soldier on today, still powering the aircraft to which they were originally mounted. The Warner 145 and 165 hp engines are the most commonly seen of the small radials for US-built pre-World War II era aircraft, in large part because of good parts availability due to the engines having been used on World War II Fairchild UC-61s and Meyers OTWs.

Warner engines are also in demand as realistically sized, though far more powerful, replacement powerplants for many replica or restored World War I era airplanes which were originally fitted with rotary engines.

=== Application list ===
- CAC Wackett
- Cessna Airmaster
- Cessna Model AW
- Curtiss XC-10
- Davis D-1
- Fairchild 22 C7E, C7F
- Fairchild 24 C8B
- Fleet Model 1
- FMA Ae.C.3
- General Aristocrat
- Gee Bee Sportster Model E
- Harlow PJC-2
- L-class blimp
- Meyers OTW
- Monocoupe 110
- Pasped Skylark
- Redfern Nieuport 17/24
- Ryan S-C
- Ryan ST-W
- Sands Fokker Dr.1 Triplane
- Sikorsky R-4
- Stinson SM-2
- Waco RSO
- Waco RBA
- Waco BNF and RNF

== Specifications (Scarab 50) ==
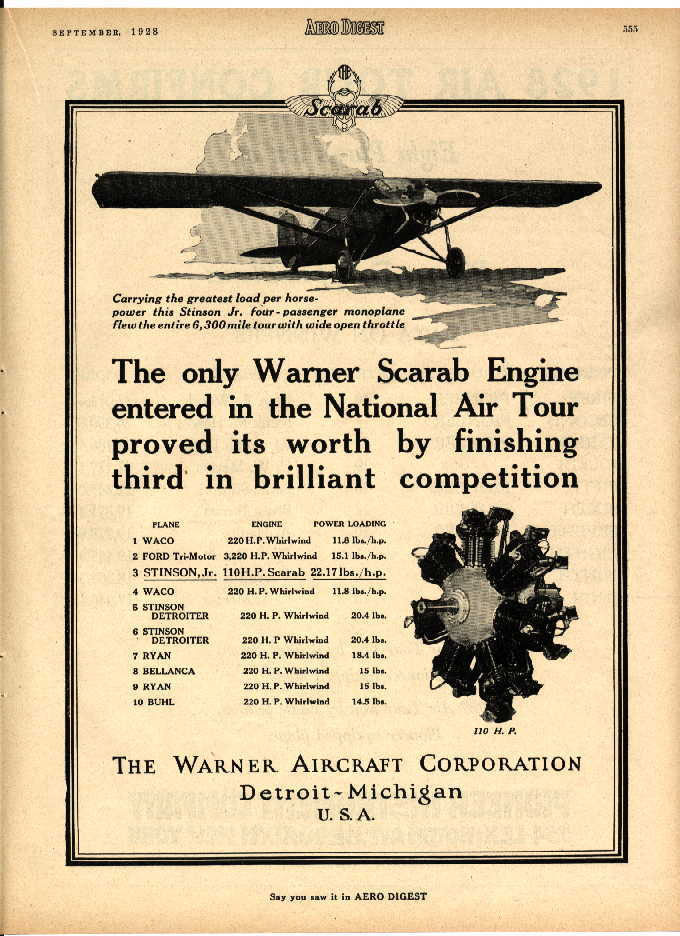
Warner Scarab engine advertisement for 1928 in Aero Digest

Data from FAA Type Certificate Data Sheet (TCDS)., Jane's all the World's Aircraft 1938

=== General characteristics ===
- Type: Seven-cylinder, air-cooled, radial piston engine
- Bore: 4.25 in (108 mm)
- Stroke: 4.25 in (108 mm)
- Displacement: 422 cu in (6.92 L)
- Length: 29 in (740 mm)
- Diameter: 36.5625 in (928.69 mm)
- Height: 36.5 in (930 mm)
- Dry weight: 292 lb (132 kg)

=== Components ===
- Valvetrain: 1 inlet and 1 exhaust valve per cylinder
- Fuel system: Stromberg NA-5SA carburetor or Holley equivalent
- Fuel type: 67 octane Avgas
- Oil system: Dry sump
- Cooling system: Air-cooled

=== Performance ===
- Power output: 125 hp (93 kW) at 2,050 rpm
- Compression ratio: 5.15:1
- Specific fuel consumption: 0.55 lb/(hp hr) [0.334 kg/(kW hr)]
- Oil consumption: 0.025 lb/(hp hr) [0.015 kg/(kW hr)]
- Power-to-weight ratio: 0.43 hp/lb

== See also ==
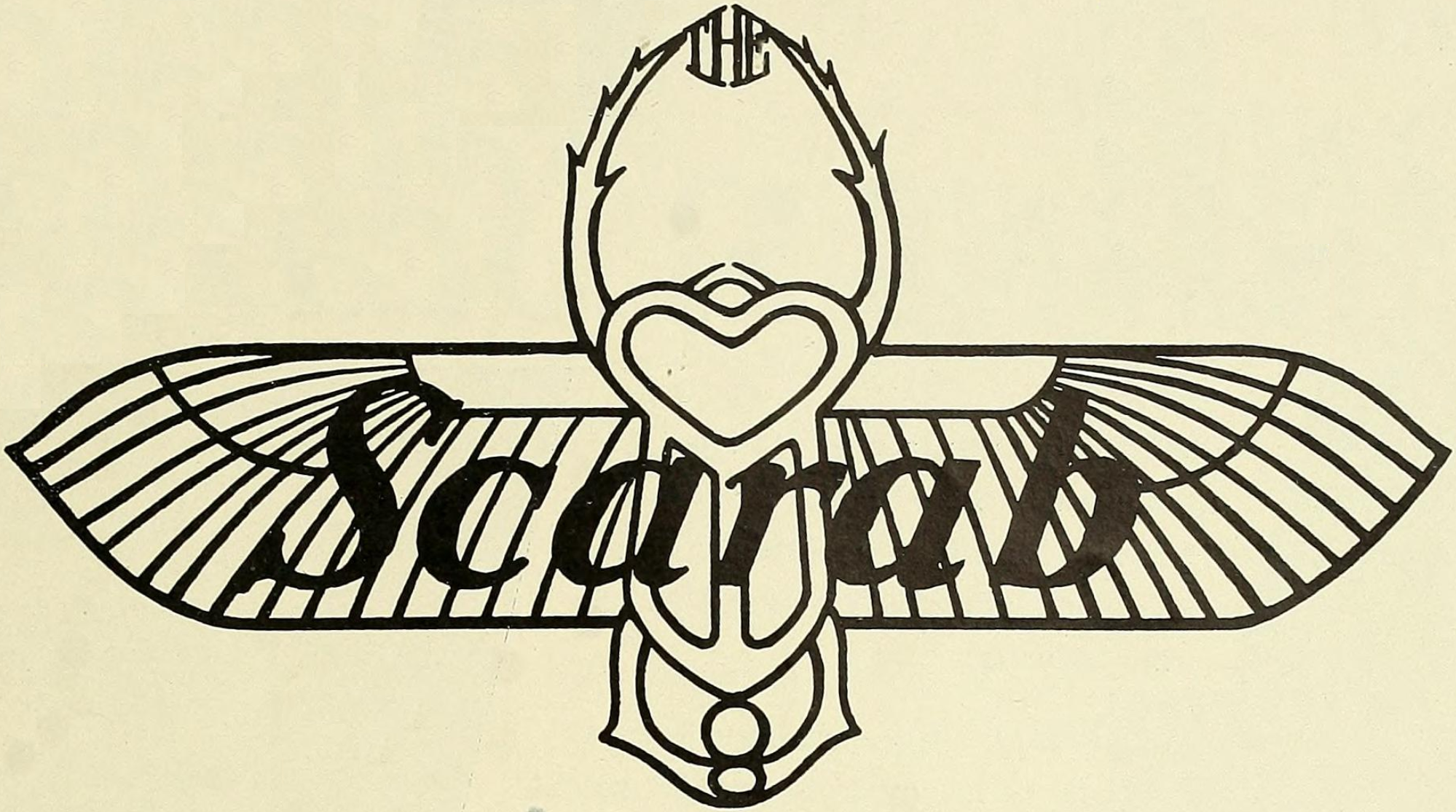
Logo of Scarab engines.

Related development

- Warner Scarab Junior

Comparable engines

- Armstrong Siddeley Genet Major
- Kinner B-5
- Pobjoy Niagara

Related lists

- List of aircraft engines
