= Fairchild 24 =

Family of general aviation and liaison aircraft

F-24 Argus
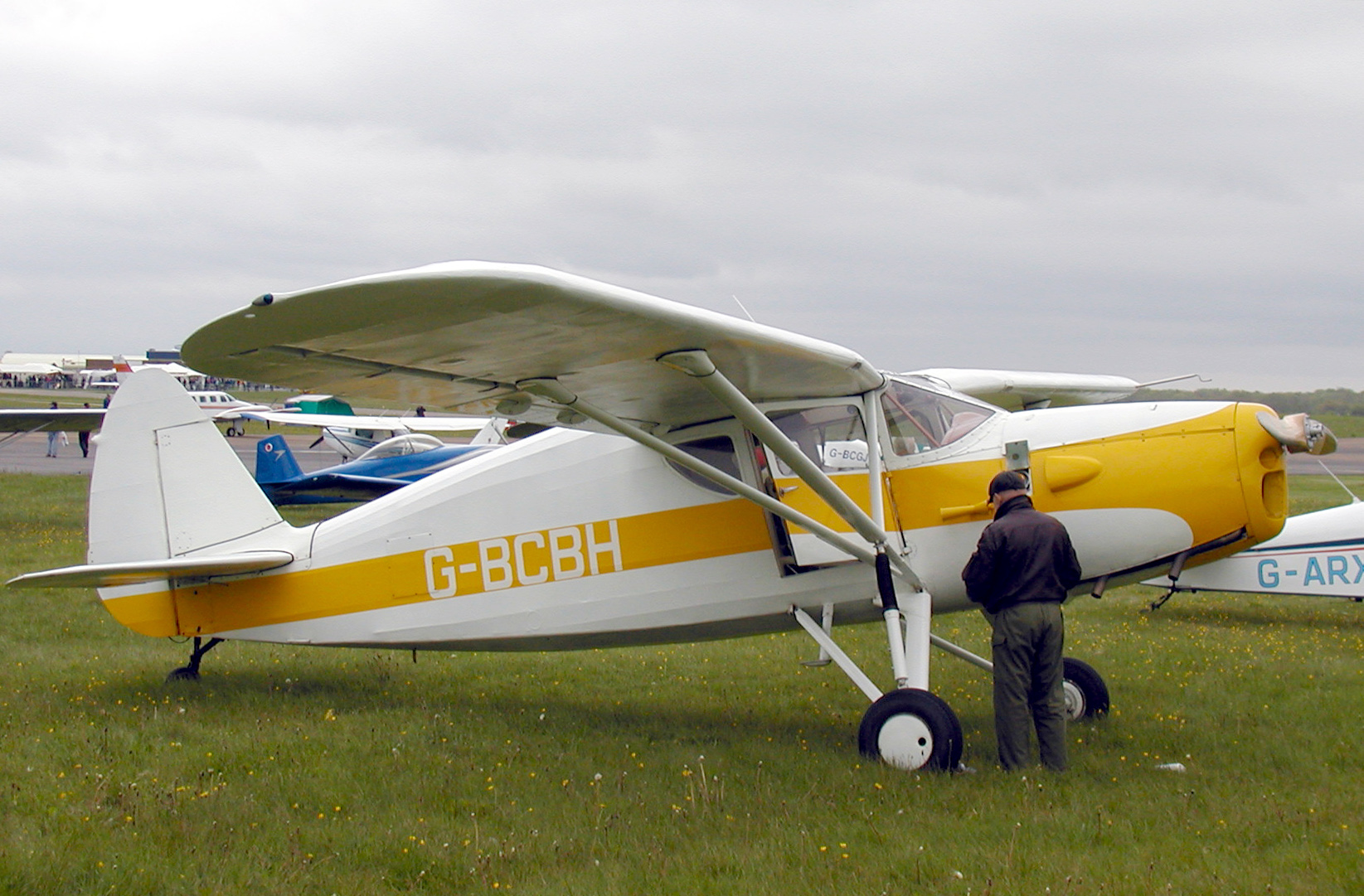
- 1944 Fairchild Argus III

General information
- Type: STOL bush plane
- Manufacturer: Fairchild
- Status: in service with private pilot owners
- Number built: 2,232

History
- Manufactured: 1932-1948
- First flight: 1932

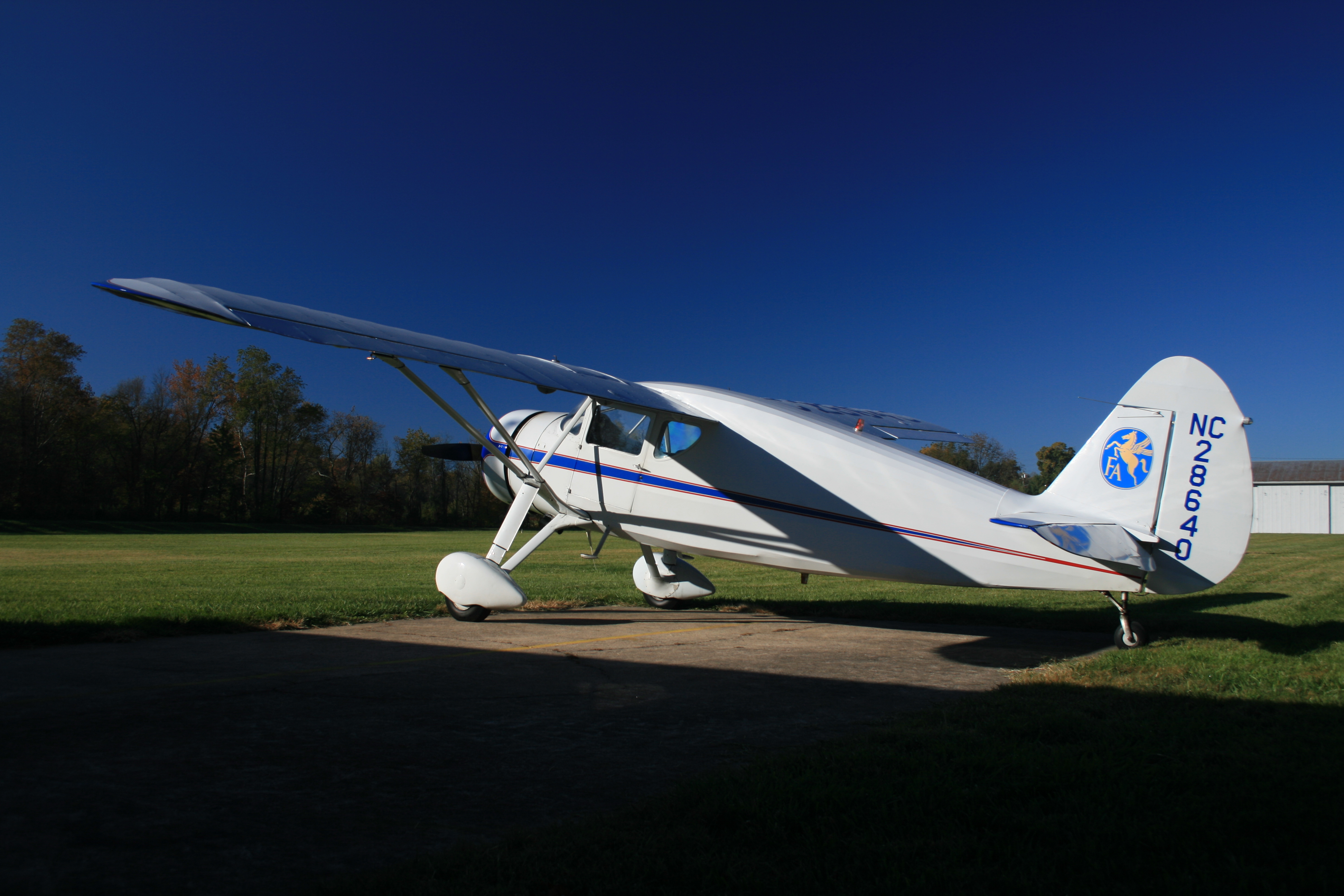
A Fairchild 24W-40 with a 165 hp Warner engine

The Fairchild Model 24, also called the Fairchild Model 24 Argus and UC-61 Forwarder, is a four-seat, single-engine monoplane light transport aircraft designed by the Fairchild Aviation Corporation in the 1930s. It was adopted by the United States Army Air Corps as UC-61 and also by the Royal Air Force. The Model 24 was itself a development of previous Fairchild models and became a successful civil and military utility aircraft. It first flew in 1932, and over 2230 would be produced by the time production ended in the late 1940s.

The original design had a radial engine, resulting in a blunt cylindrical nose, while the later UC-61K and UC-86 used a different engine configuration resulting in a more tapered nose; overall several different engines were used across variants.

== Design and development ==
Fairchild Aircraft was hit hard by the Great Depression in the early 1930s as airline purchases disappeared. Consequently, the company attention turned to developing a reliable and rugged small aircraft for personal and business use. The Fairchild 22 became somewhat of a hit and led directly to the new and much improved Model 24 which gained rapid popularity in the early 1930s, noted for its pleasant handling characteristics and roomy interior. Having adapted many components from the automotive industry (namely expansion-shoe brakes and roll-down cabin windows), the aircraft was also affordable and easy to maintain. In production continuously from 1932 to 1948, the aircraft remained essentially unchanged aerodynamically and internally, with the addition of extra passenger seating and optional equipment.

Designed by George Hardman's team, according to H.L. Puckett, "After the success of the F-22, the Hardman design team was directed to begin work on an enclosed airplane similar to the F-22. This design was to be known as the F-24 and was to be a side-by-side two place enclosed cabin airplane using as much design data and tooling from the F-22 as possible. The prototype F-24 was test flown at Hagerstown, Maryland late 1931.The original two seat F-24 gave way to a three place version and then to a four place model. Most of the F-24 airplanes produced were powered with the 145 h.p. Warner Scarab and later with the 165 h.p. Warner Super Scarab. The Model 24 was powered in 1935 with the Ranger 150 h.p. engine. In 1938, the F-24K and J models experienced the last major changes, one of these being the revised more graceful rudder and vertical tail later to be seen in the PT series and a 165 h.p. Ranger engine was fitted under the cowling of the K model. In 1939 the F-24 reached the peak of refinement with the addition of hydraulic brakes and a new tail assembly."

The Fairchild 24 built by Kreider-Reisner Aircraft, a division of Fairchild Aviation Corporation, remained in production from 1932 to 1948, essentially the same airframe but with various powerplant and configuration enhancements. In all, Fairchild constructed over 1,500 Model 24s, with an additional 280 being constructed by the Texas Engineering & Manufacturing Company (TEMCO) in Dallas when that company purchased the manufacturing rights after World War II.

== Operational history ==
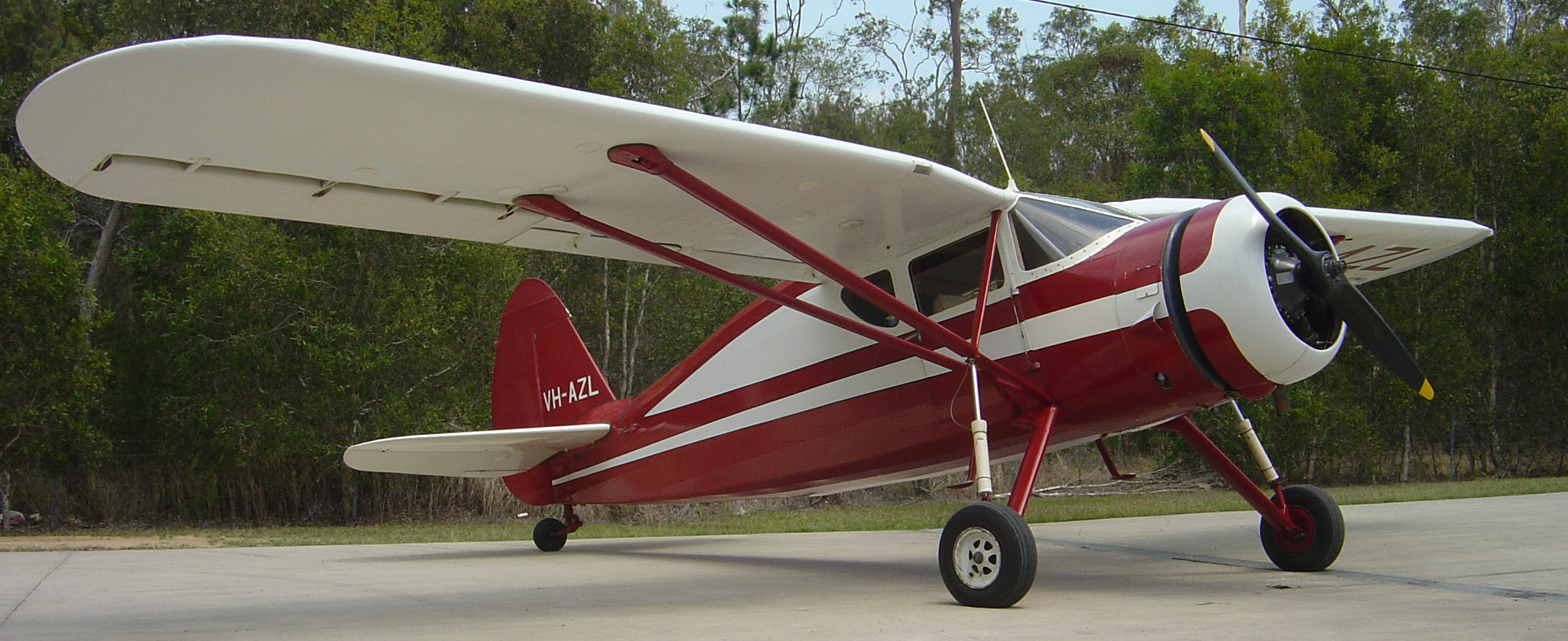
Australian Fairchild 24 Argus

In civil use, the aircraft was a quick sales success, with prominent businessmen and Hollywood actors purchasing the aircraft. In 1936, the US Navy ordered Model 24s designated as GK-1 research and instrument trainers. The type was also used by the US Army as a light transport and by the Coast Guard, with the designation J2K-1. The Civil Air Patrol operated many Fairchild UC-61/24s, and some aircraft were fitted with two 100-pound bombs for what became successful missions against German U-boats off the east coast of the United States in the early stages of the Second World War. The UC-61 was also procured by the US Navy as the GK-1 and by the British Royal Air Force as the Fairchild Argus.

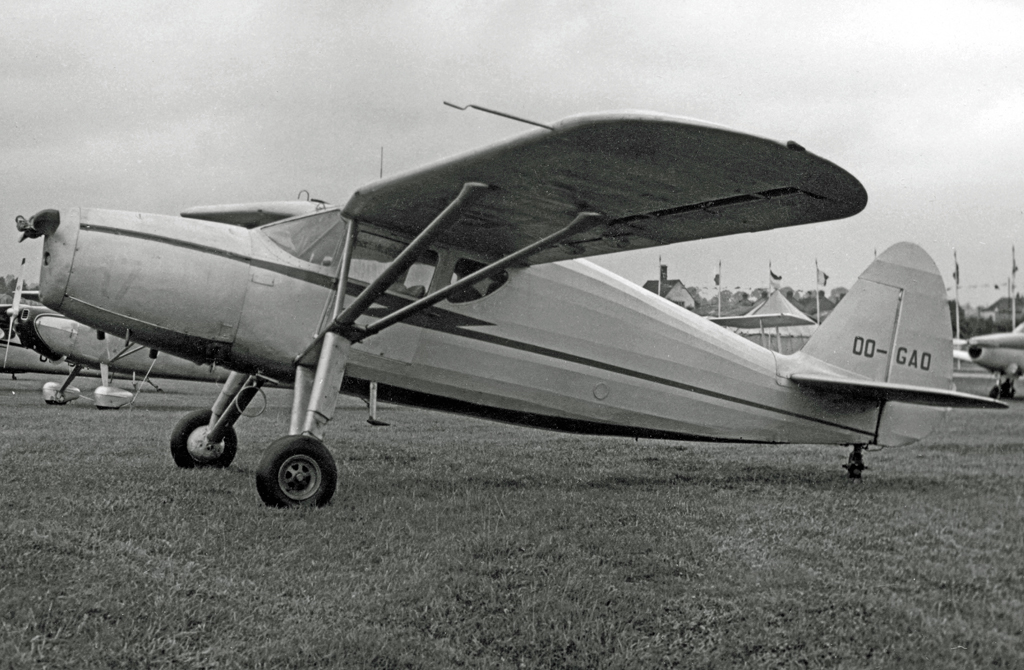
Fairchild UC-61K supplied as an Argus III to the RAF in 1944 and sold to a civil owner in Belgium postwar

In 1941, the United States Army Air Forces (USAAF) placed an initial order for 163 Fairchild C-61s; however, via Lend-Lease, 161 of these were shipped abroad. Under the auspices of this program, the majority of the 525 Warner Scarab Fairchild 24s/C-61s went to Great Britain. Most of these aircraft saw service as Argus Is and improved Argus IIs and were allocated to a newly formed adjunct of the Royal Air Force (RAF), the Air Transport Auxiliary (ATA). An additional 306 Ranger-powered Argus IIIs were also used by the ATA. In British service, the majority of the Argus type operated with the ATA ferrying their aircrew to collect or deliver aircraft to and from manufacturers, Maintenance Units (MU)s and operational bases.

The Argus I was a Warner Scarab-equipped aircraft identified by its wind-driven generator located on the starboard struts, and was equipped with a black-painted propeller. The Argus II was also a Scarab-powered aircraft, usually with a transparent cabin roof. This mark was certified for heavier operational weight than the Mark I and was identified by its yellow propeller. The Argus III was equipped with the six-cylinder inverted inline Ranger engine.

=== Postwar ===
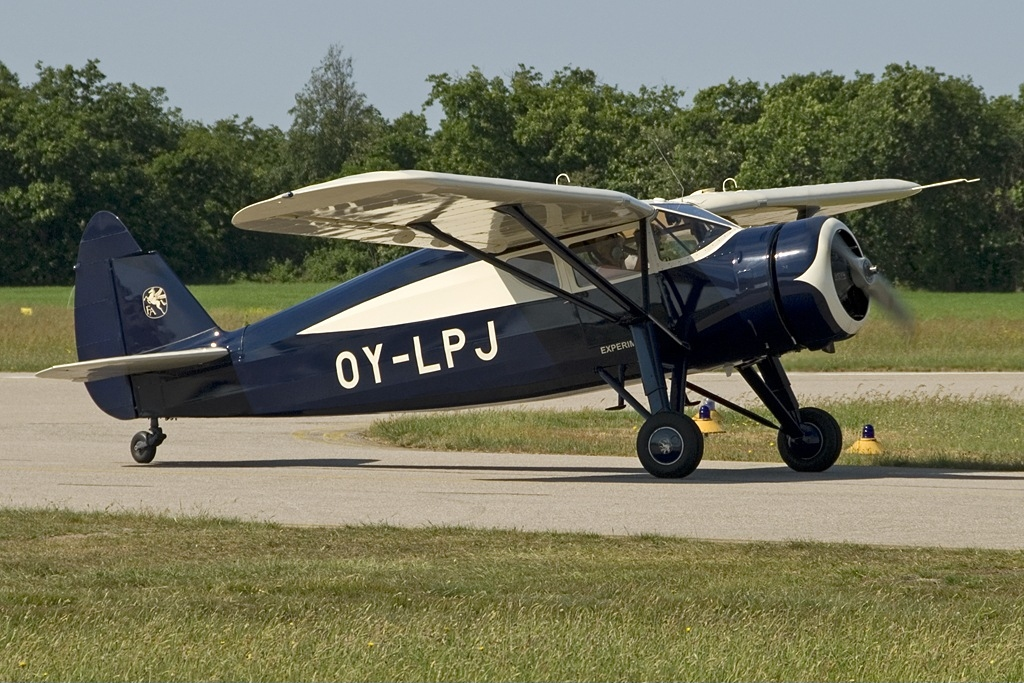
UC-61A Forwarder/Argus II in private hands

The aircraft was used by small air charter operators for short-distance taxi work and many were acquired by private pilot owners. It served with military forces as diverse as Finland, Thailand, Israel, Canada, the United States and Australia.

The last "new" Fairchild 24 was assembled in 1948 from a large inventory of leftover parts in Winfield, KS.

Ten Fairchild F24R aircraft operated for Comair (South Africa) during the period after the Second World War.

== Civilian models ==
Civilian models
| Year produced | Model | Number built | Engine | Notes |
|---|---|---|---|---|
| 1932 | F-24 C8 | | 95-hp American Cirrus | Gross wt 1,600 lb, Cruise 90 mph. Cost $3,360 |
| 1933 | F-24 C8A | 25 (includes C8) | 125-hp Warner Scarab | Gross Wt. 1,800 lb, Cruise 95 mph, Cost $3,850 |
| 1933 | F-24 C8B | 2 | 125-hp Menasco | Cost $3,990 |
| 1934 | F-24 C8C | 125 | 145-hp Warner Super Scarab | Gross Wt. 2,400 lb. Cost $5,000 |
| 1935 | F-24 C8D | 10 | 145-hp Fairchild Ranger | |
| 1936 | F-24 C8E | 50 | 145-hp Warner Super Scarab | New cantilever tail. Cost $5,390 |
| 1936 | F-24 C8F | 40 | 145-hp Fairchild Ranger | Cost $5,390 |
| 1937 | F-24 G | 100 | 145-hp Warner Super Scarab | Cost $5,290 |
| 1937 | F-24 H | 25 | 150-hp Fairchild Ranger | Cost $5,590 |
| 1938 | F-24 J | 10 | 145-hp Warner Super Scarab | Gross Wt. 2,550 lb. Increased size. Cruise 115 mph |
| 1939 | F-24 K | 60 | 145-hp Fairchild Ranger | Increased size. Cruise 125 mph. Cost $6,500 |
| 1939 | F-24R9 | 35 | 165-hp Fairchild Ranger | |
| 1939 | F-24W9 | 30 | 145-hp Warner Super Scarab | |
| 1940 | F-24R40 | 25 | 175-hp Fairchild Ranger | Cost $7,230 |
| 1940 | F-24W40 | 75 | 145-hp Warner Super Scarab | Cost $6,290 |
| 1941 | F-24W41 | 30 | 165-hp Warner Super Scarab | |
| 1941 | UC-61 | 640 | 165-hp Warner Super Scarab | Same as model W41 |
| 1942-43 | UC-61A | 364 | 165-hp Warner Super Scarab | |
| 1944 | UC-61K | 306 | 200-hp Fairchild Ranger | Gross Wt. 2,562 lb. Same as model R40 |
| 1946 | F-24R46 | | 175-hp Fairchild Ranger | Cruise 118 mph. Price $8,875 |
| 1946 | F-24W46 | 280 (includes R46) | 165-hp Warner Super Scarab | Cost $8,500 |

== Military variants ==
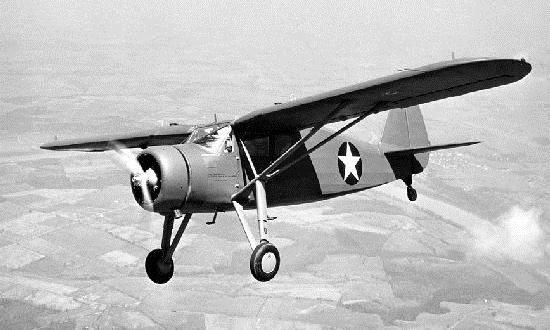
A UC-61

UC-61 Argus
Military version of the Fairchild Model F24W-41 powered by a 165hp R-500-1, 161 built.
UC-61A Argus
Military version of the Fairchild Model F24W-41 with radio and 24-volt electrical system, 509 built and three impressed civilian aircraft.
UC-61B
One impressed Model 24J powered by a 145hp Warner Scarab radial.
UC-61C
One impressed Model 24R9.
UC-61D
Three impressed Model 51As.
UC-61E
Three impressed Model 24Ks.
UC-61F
Two impressed Model 24R9s.
UC-61G
Two impressed Model 24W-40s.
UC-61H
One impressed Model 24H powered by a 150hp Ranger 6-410-B.
UC-61J
One impressed Model 24-C8F two-seater, powered by a 150 hp Ranger 6-390-D3.

UC-61K Forwarder
Final production variant powered by a 200 hp L-440-7, 306 built.

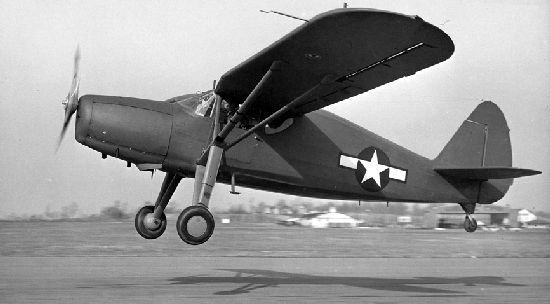
A UC-86

UC-86
Nine impressed Model 24R-40s powered by 175 hp L-410.
XUC-86A
One modified Model 24R-9 powered by a 200 hp L-440.

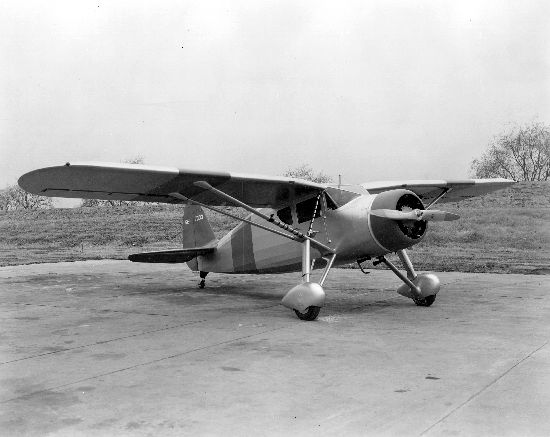
A GK-1

GK-1
Thirteen Model 24W-40 impressed by the United States Navy.
J2K-1
United States Coast Guard version of the Model 24R, two built.
J2K-2
As J2K-1 with detailed changes, two built.

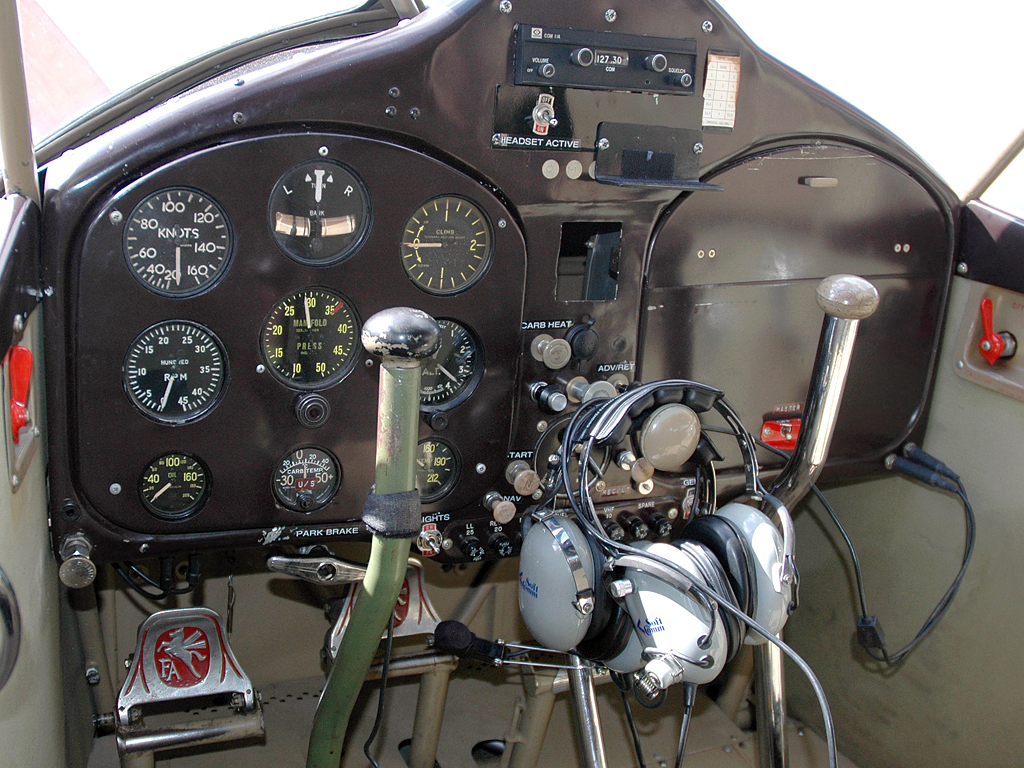
Argus I cockpit

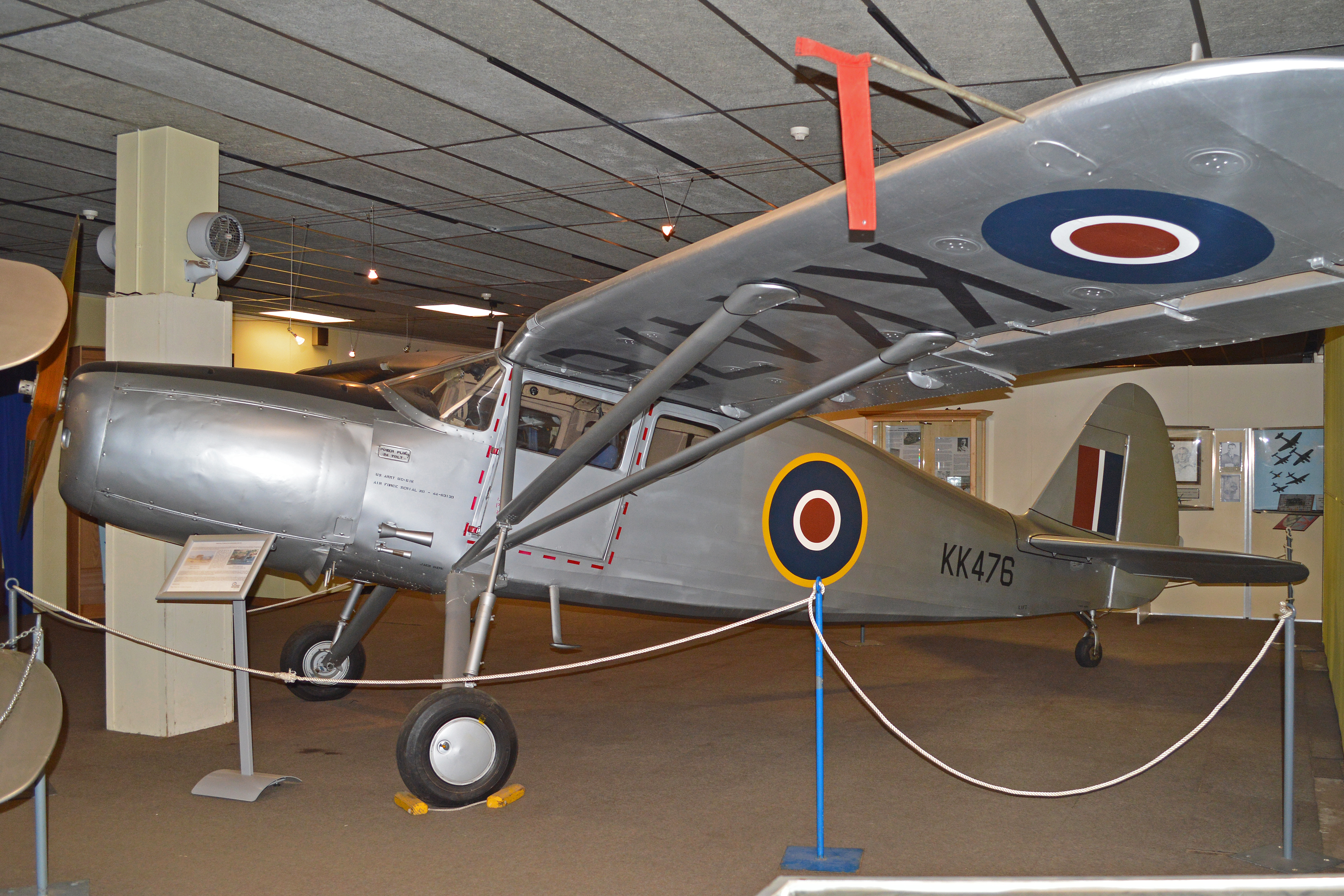
Fairchild Argus III

Argus I
Royal Air Force designation for the Model 24W-41 (UC-61), 118 under Lend-Lease
Argus II
Royal Air Force designation for the Model 24W-41A (UC-61 and UC-61A), 407 under Lend-Lease
Argus III
Royal Air Force designation for the Model 24R (UC-61K), 306 under Lend-Lease
B.S.1
(Thai: บ.ส.๑) Royal Thai Armed Forces designation for the F-24J and F-24K.

== Operators ==
Australia

- Royal Australian Air Force

Brazil

- NAB – Navegação Aérea Brasileira

Canada

- Royal Canadian Air Force

Czechoslovakia

- Czechoslovak Security Aviation Unit

Israel

- Sherut Avir
- Israeli Air Force

Italy

- Italian Air Force operated 4 Fairchild UC-61K Argus received from Royal Air Force from 1947 until 1951

Finland

- Finnish Air Force

South Africa

- South African Air Force operated one aircraft 1939–1945.

Sweden

- Swedish Air Force

Thailand

- Royal Thai Air Force

United Kingdom

- Royal Air Force

United States

- United States Army Air Forces
- United States Marine Corps
- United States Navy
- United States Coast Guard
- Civil Air Patrol

== Accidents and incidents ==
Toronto Maple Leafs NHL Hockey player Bill Barilko and his dentist Henry Hudson disappeared on August 26, 1951, aboard Hudson's Fairchild 24 floatplane, flying from Seal River, Quebec. On June 6, 1962, helicopter pilot Ron Boyd discovered the wreckage about 100 kilometres (62 mi) north of Cochrane, Ontario, about 35 miles off course. The cause of the crash was deemed to have been a combination of pilot inexperience, poor weather and overloaded cargo.

Alaskan missionary Harold L. Wood (1890–1944) died in his Fairchild 24 floatplane while landing near a logging camp at Kasaan Bay (30 miles northwest of Ketchikan, Alaska) on 24 February 1944. The cause of the crash was deemed to have been a pilot's health problem.

== Surviving aircraft ==
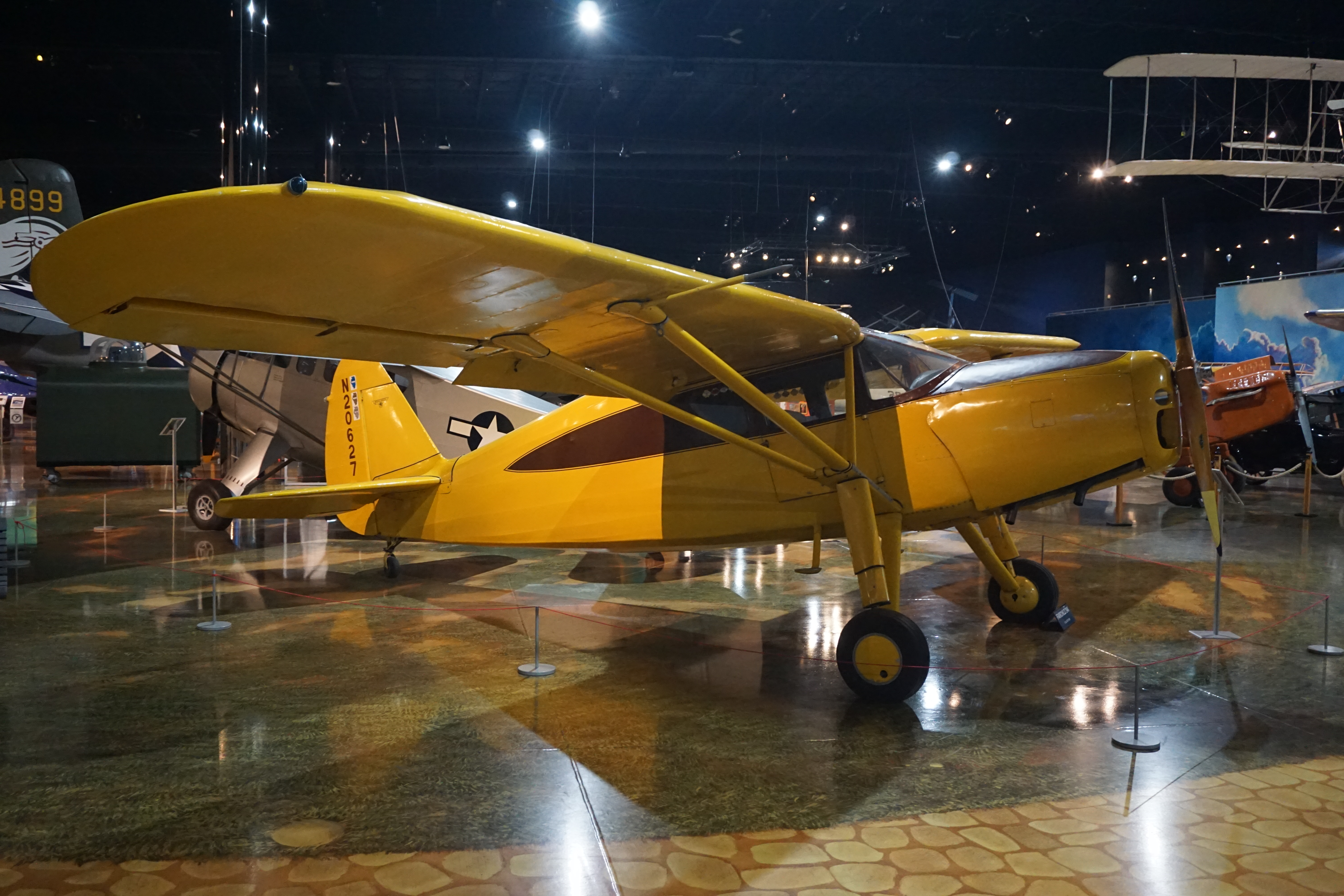
Fairchild 24 K Forwarder on display at the Air Zoo

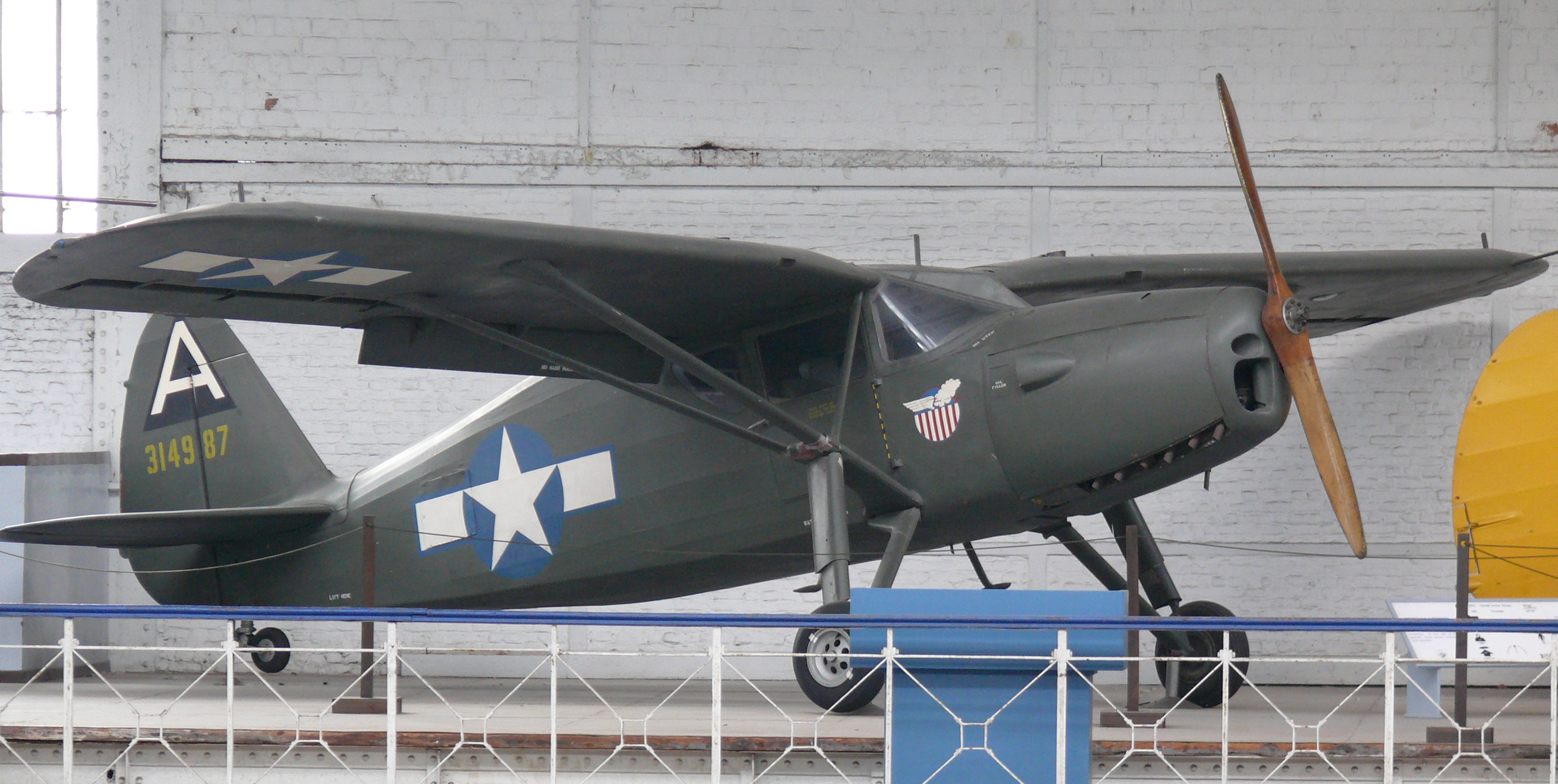
Fairchild VC 61 K Forwarder in the Royal Military Museum, Brussels

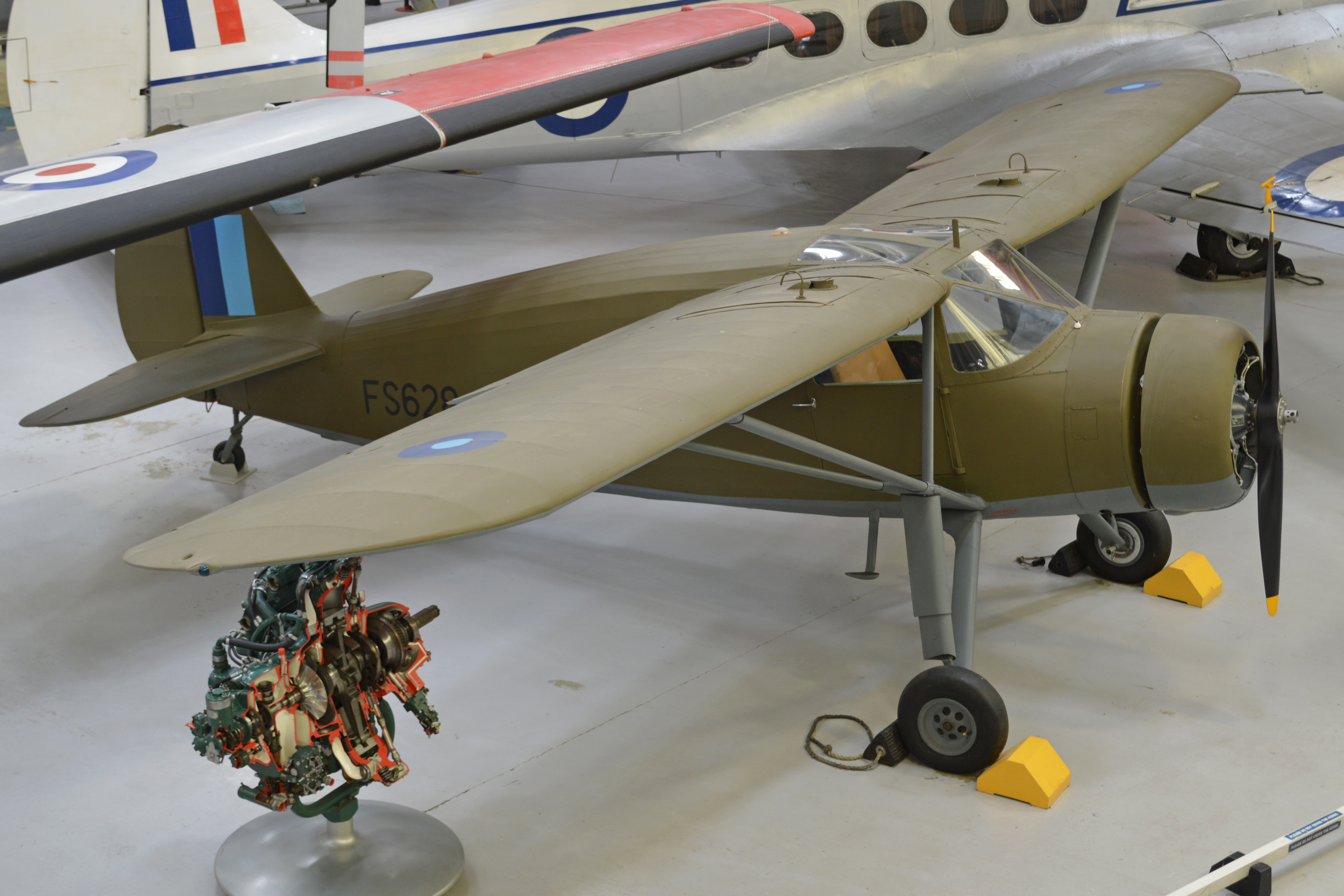
UC-61 painted as RAF Argus II at Royal Air Force Museum Midlands

- 206 – Fairchild 24 W on static display at the Museum of Flight in Seattle, Washington.
- 2009 – Fairchild 24-C8 on display at the EAA Aviation Museum in Oshkosh, Wisconsin.
- 2724 – Fairchild 24-C8C on static display at the Hiller Aviation Museum in San Carlos, California.
- 2926 – Fairchild 24 G airworthy at the Western Antique Aeroplane & Automobile Museum in Hood River, Oregon.
- 2933 - Fairchild 24 G on display at the Ted Stevens Anchorage International Airport in Anchorage, Alaska.
- 2987 – Fairchild 24 G on display at the Mid-Atlantic Air Museum in Reading, Pennsylvania.
- 3101 – Fairchild 24-C8F on static display at the Norfolk and Suffolk Aviation Museum in Flixton, Suffolk.
- 3118 – Fairchild 24-C8F on static display at the National Museum of the United States Air Force in Dayton, Ohio.
- 3224 – Fairchild 24 H on static display at the Old Rhinebeck Aerodrome in Red Hook, New York.
- 3309 – Fairchild 24 K on display at the Air Zoo in Kalamazoo, Michigan.
- 7033 – GK-1 on static display at the Tillamook Air Museum in Tillamook, Oregon.
- 42-68852 – XUC-86A under restoration to airworthy condition by the Butler County Warbirds in Middletown, Ohio.
- 42-78040 – UC-68 airworthy at the Western Antique Aeroplane & Automobile Museum in Hood River, Oregon.
- 43-14601 – UC-61A on static display at the Royal Air Force Museum Midlands in Cosford, Shropshire, England.
- FK338 – Argus II on static display at the Yorkshire Air Museum in Elvington, York, England.
- KK527 (G-RGUS) – Fairchild Argus 24 R-46A from 1944 available for private hire at Fowlmere Airfield, England
- R46-129 – Fairchild 24 R-46 on display at the Hagerstown Aviation Museum in Hagerstown, Maryland.
- R46-137 – Fairchild 24 R-46 on display at the Western North Carolina Air Museum in Hendersonville, North Carolina.
- R46-250 – Fairchild 24 R airworthy at the Canadian Historical Aircraft Association in Windsor, Ontario.
- W213 – Fairchild 24 airworthy at the Champaign Aviation Museum in Urbana, Ohio.
- W46295 – Fairchild 24 W-46 airworthy at the Combat Air Museum in Topeka, Kansas.
- Fairchild 24 C8E in storage at the Reynolds-Alberta Museum in Wetaskiwin, Alberta.
- Fairchild 24 S/N 305M-0001 Airworthy in the Fundación Aeronáutica Antonio Quintana in Madrid, Spain
- Fairchild 24 C8C is under restoration at Air Heritage Aviation Museum in Beaver Falls, Pennsylvania
- Fairchild UC-61K Forwarder (c/n 0951) on static display at the Royal Museum of the Armed Forces and Military History in Brussels.
- 24W46 G-SEDC in flying condition in the UK.

== Specifications (UC-61) ==
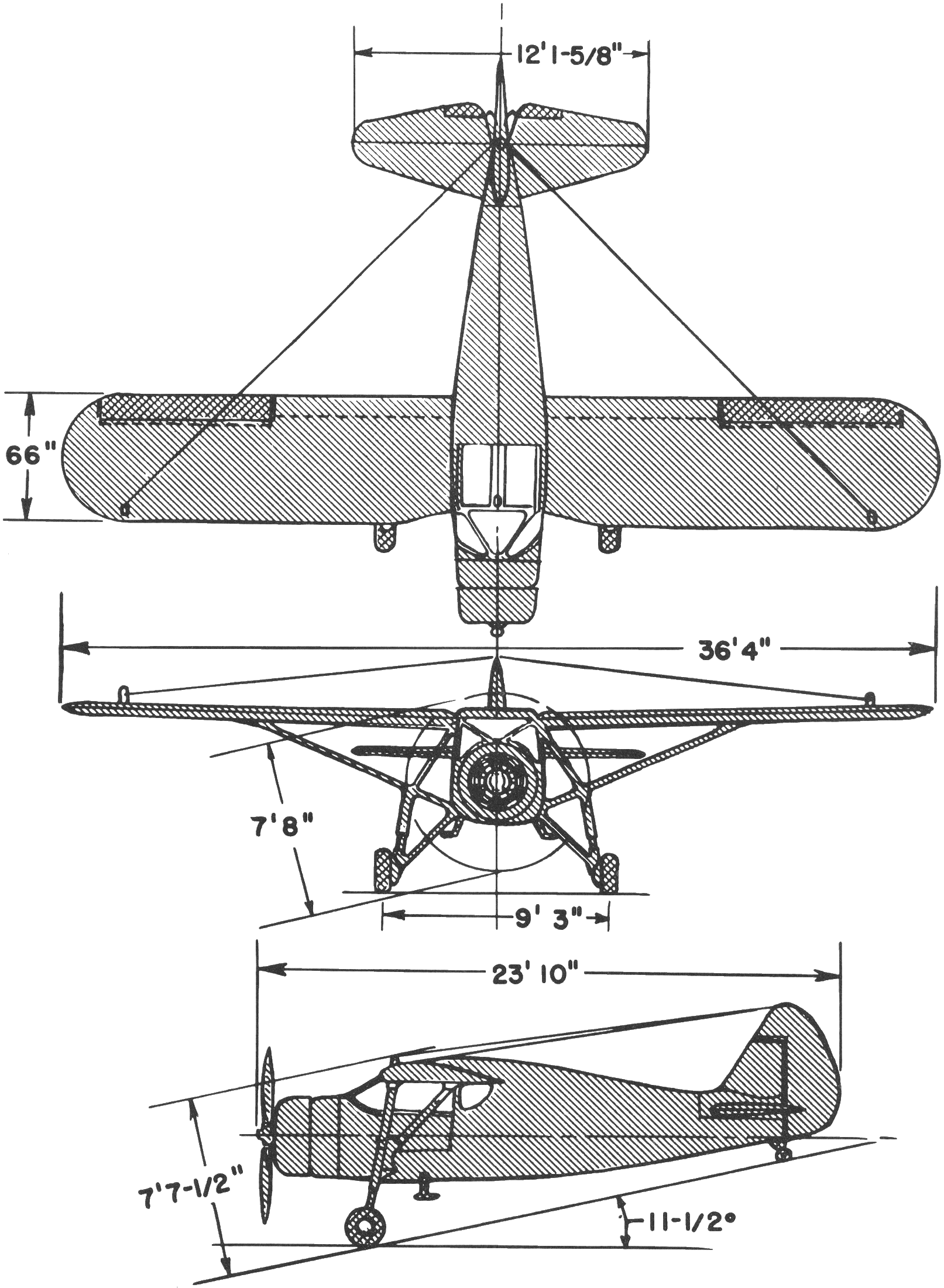
3-view line drawing of the Fairchild UC-61 Forwarder

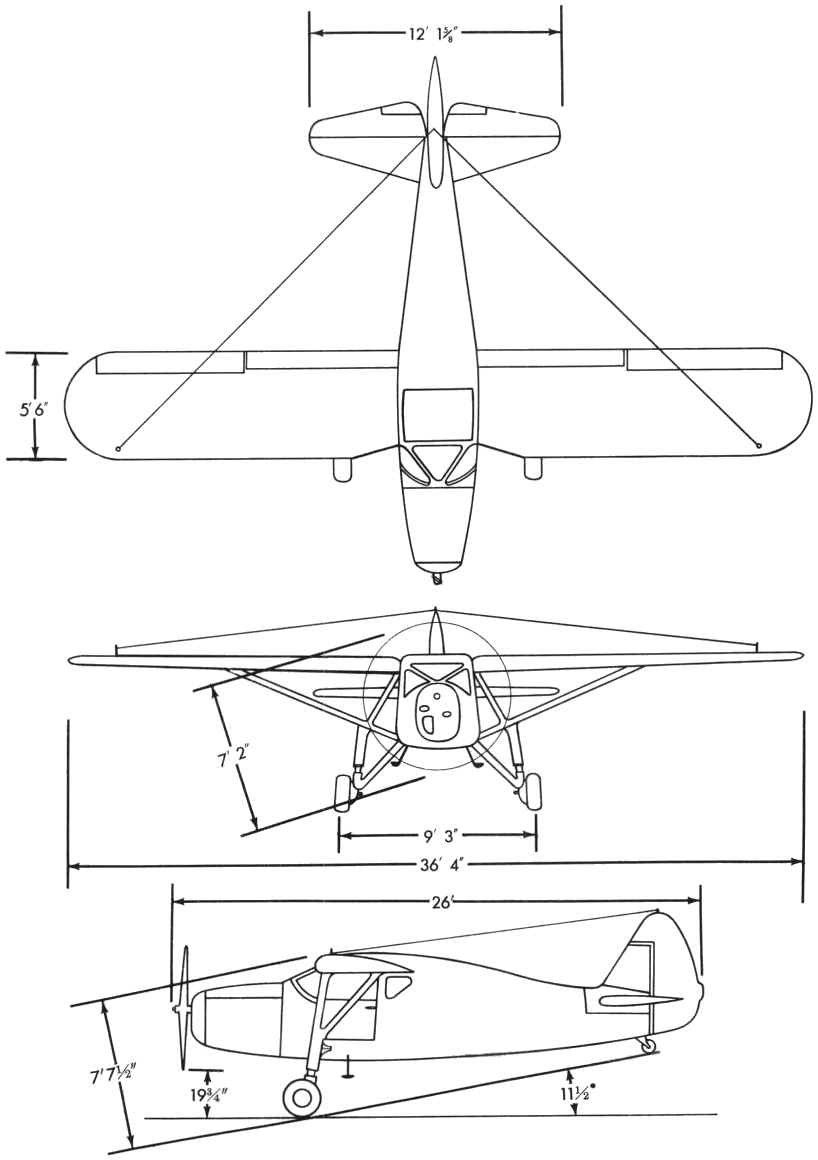
3-view line drawing of the Fairchild UC-61K Forwarder

Data from

General characteristics

- Crew: one
- Capacity: three passengers
- Length: 23 ft 10 in (7.27 m)
- Wingspan: 36 ft 4 in (11.08 m)
- Height: 7 ft 8 in (2.34 m)
- Wing area: 193 sq ft (17.9 m^{2})
- Empty weight: 1,813 lb (822 kg)
- Max takeoff weight: 2,882 lb (1,307 kg)
- Powerplant: 1 × Ranger L-440-5 6-cyl. inverted air-cooled in-line piston engine, 200 hp (150 kW)

Performance

- Maximum speed: 108 kn (124 mph, 200 km/h)
- Range: 404 nmi (465 mi, 748 km)
- Service ceiling: 12,700 ft (3,900 m)

== Notable appearances ==
In literature

Fairchild 24 was mentioned by Richard Bach in his memoirs «Biplane» written in 1966.

== See also ==
Related development

- Fairchild 22

Aircraft of comparable role, configuration, and era

- Cessna Airmaster
- Howard DGA-15
- Monocoupe 90
- Stinson Reliant
- Waco Standard Cabin series

Related lists

- List of aircraft of World War II

== Bibliography ==
- Elliot, Bryn (March–April 1997). "Bears in the Air: The US Air Police Perspective". Air Enthusiast. No. 68. pp. 46–51. ISSN 0143-5450.
