= Fairchild 22 =

American two-seat touring or training monoplane

22 Model C7
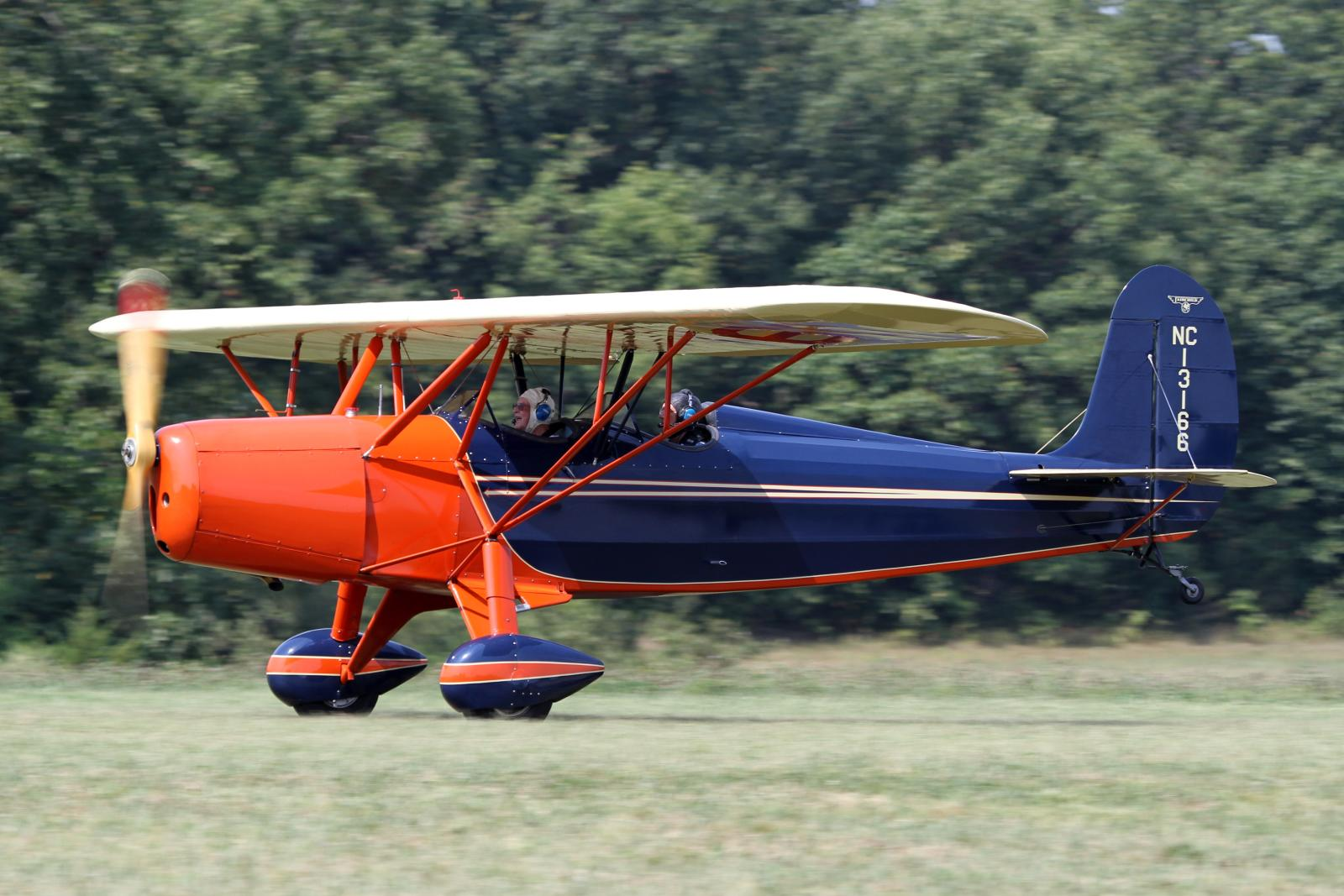
- Fairchild 22 C7B

General information
- Type: Two-seat light touring or training monoplane
- Manufacturer: Fairchild Aircraft Corporation
- Designer: George Hardman
- Number built: 127

History
- Manufactured: 1931-1935
- First flight: 1931
- Developed into: Fairchild 24

The Fairchild 22 Model C7 is an American two-seat touring or training monoplane designed and built by the Kreider-Reisner division of the Fairchild Aircraft Corporation at Hagerstown, Maryland. The aircraft has a parasol wing configuration and was used with a variety of engines; 127 were produced from 1931 to 1935.

The aircraft was tested with a variety of wing configurations and features by NACA.

== Development ==
The aircraft was designed by George Hardman of Kreider-Reisner after Sherman Fairchild purchased the company. Marketed as the Fairchild 22 Model C7 the aircraft was certified in March 1931. The Fairchild 22 was a mixed-construction, braced parasol-wing monoplane with a fixed tailwheel landing gear and a braced tail unit. It had two tandem open cockpits and was initially powered by an 80 hp (60 kW) Armstrong Siddeley Genet radial engine. After test flying the prototype the first production aircraft were re-engined with a 75 hp (56 kW) Michigan Rover inverted inline engine. The aircraft was fitted with both inline and radial piston engines.

== Variants ==
C7
Powered by a 75hp Michigan Rover four-cylinder inverted inline piston engine (13 built)
C7A
Powered by a 95hp Cirrus Hi-Drive four-cylinder inverted inline piston engine (58 built).
C7B
Powered by a 125hp Menasco C-4 Pirate four-cylinder inverted inline piston engine (eight built).

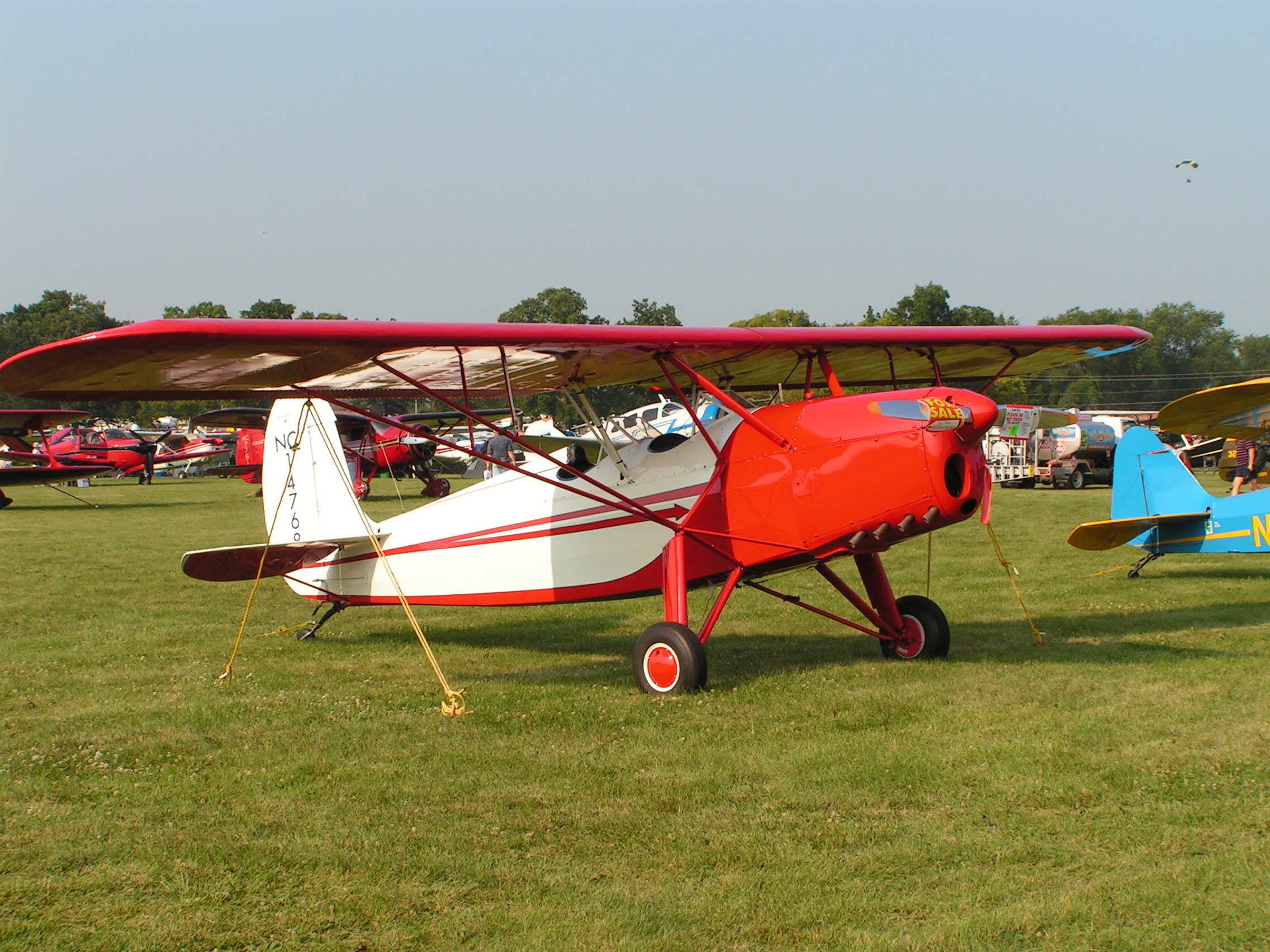
Fairchild Model C7D

C7D
Powered by a 90hp Wright Gipsy four-cylinder upright inline piston engine (one C-7C and 22 C-7D built).
C7E
Powered by a 125hp Warner Scarab seven-cylinder radial piston engine (11 built).
C7F
Powered by a 145hp Warner Super Scarab seven-cylinder radial piston engine (nine built).
C7G

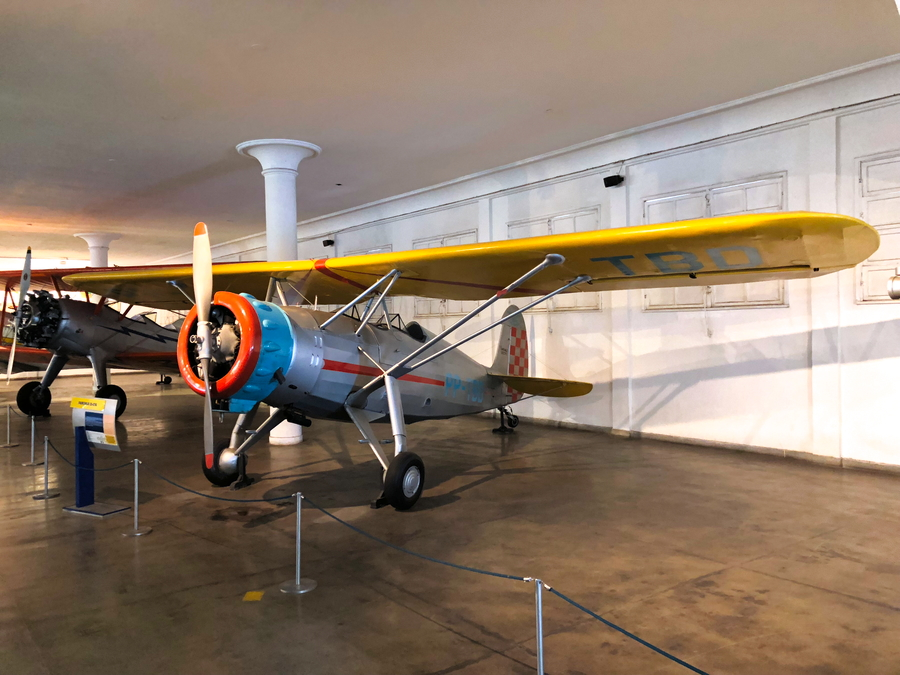
Fairchild 22 Model C7G preserved at MUSAL

Aerobatic version, powered by a 145hp Warner Super Scarab seven-cylinder radial piston engine (six built).

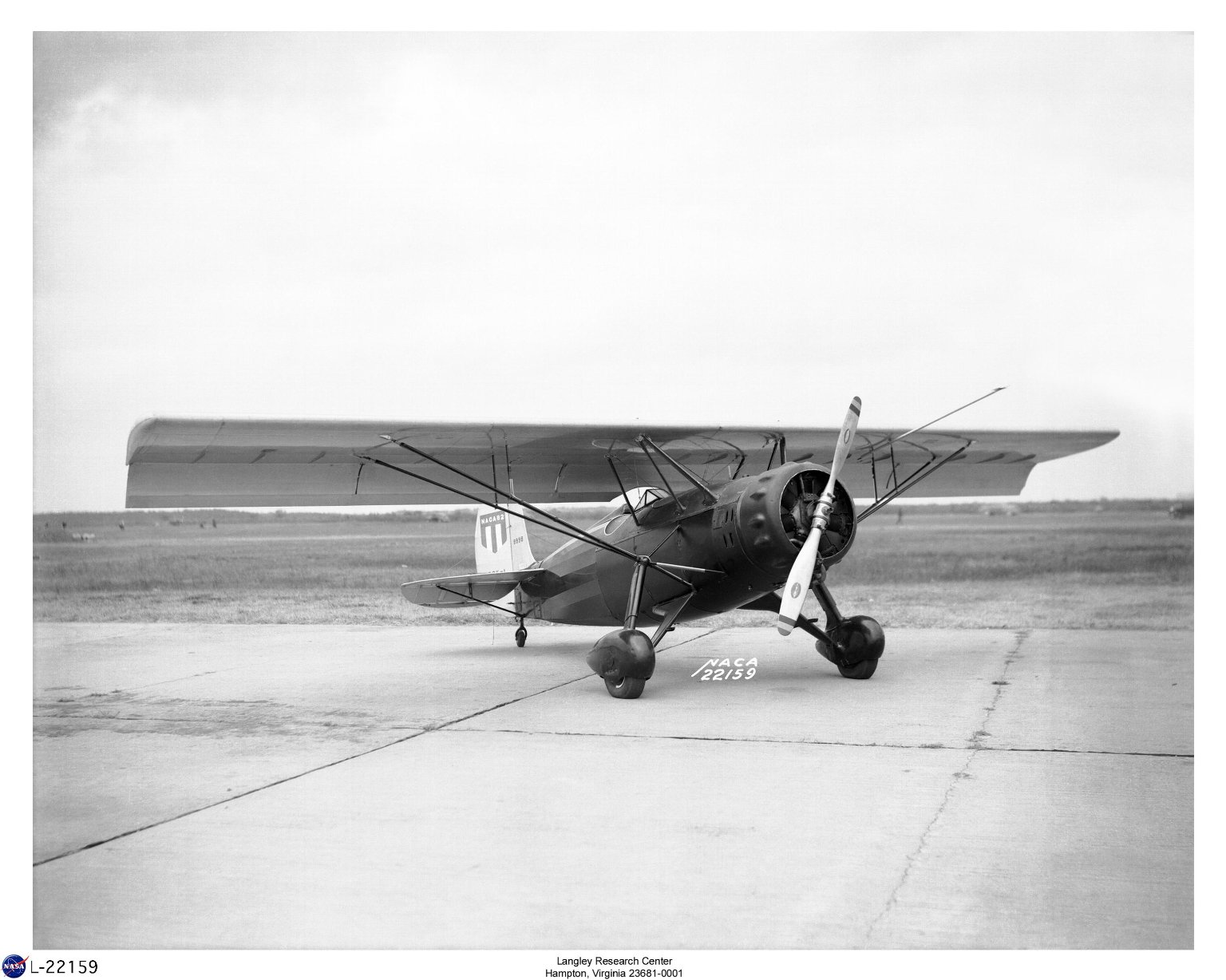
XR2K-1 at Langley

XR2K-1
Military designation for one Scarab powered Model 22 impressed into service and used by NACA.
NX14768
Experimentally designed wing added to the 1933 Fairchild 22 owned by Charles Townsend Ludington under the Ludington-Griswold Incorporated company, Saybrook, CT. Test flown in 1944, the wing had a series of flaps and wing tip fins. The design proved disappointing and the airplane was later sold.

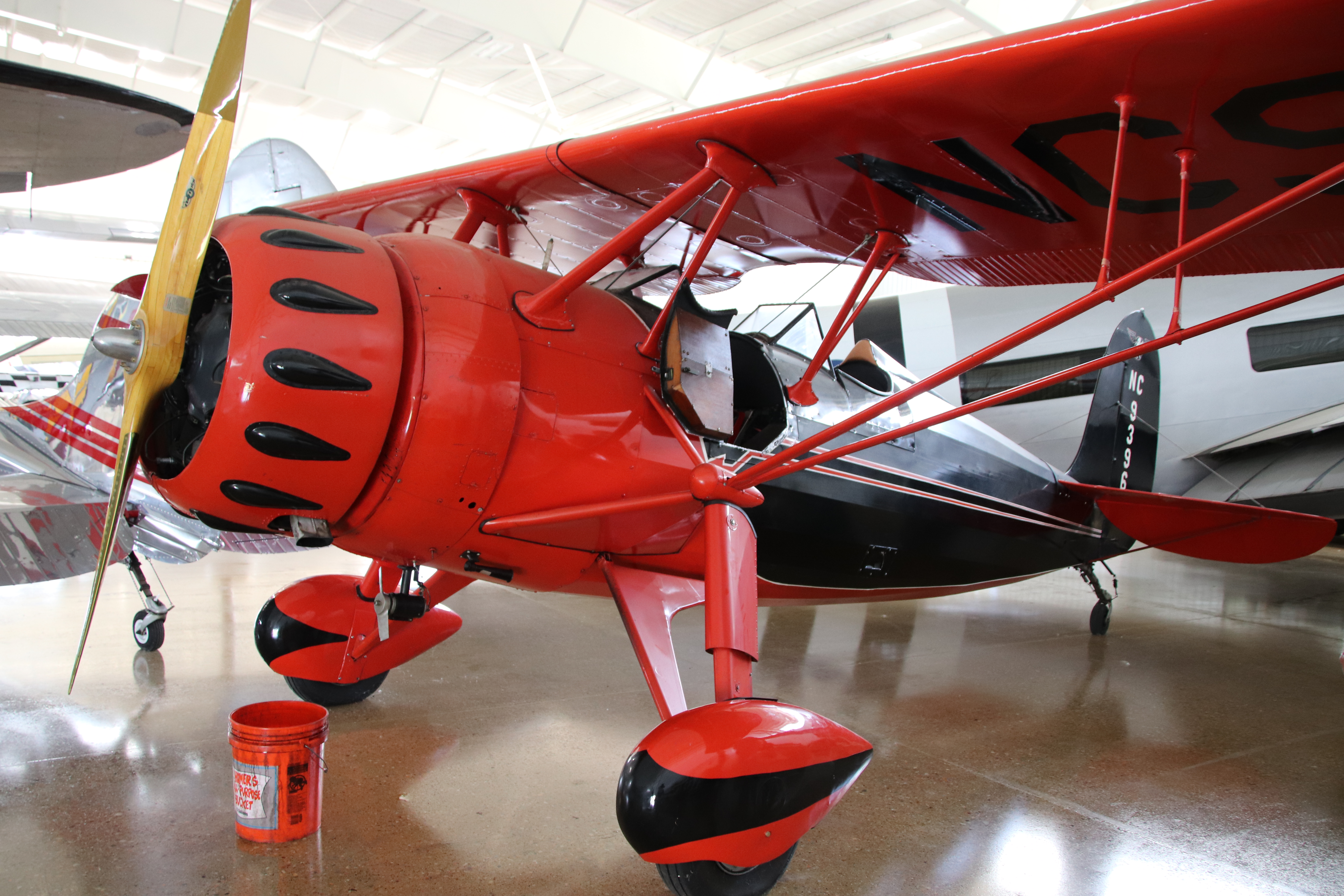
Fairchild 22C-7E at Mid America Flight Museum, Texas

== NACA variants ==
NACA tested a variety of changes on the aircraft

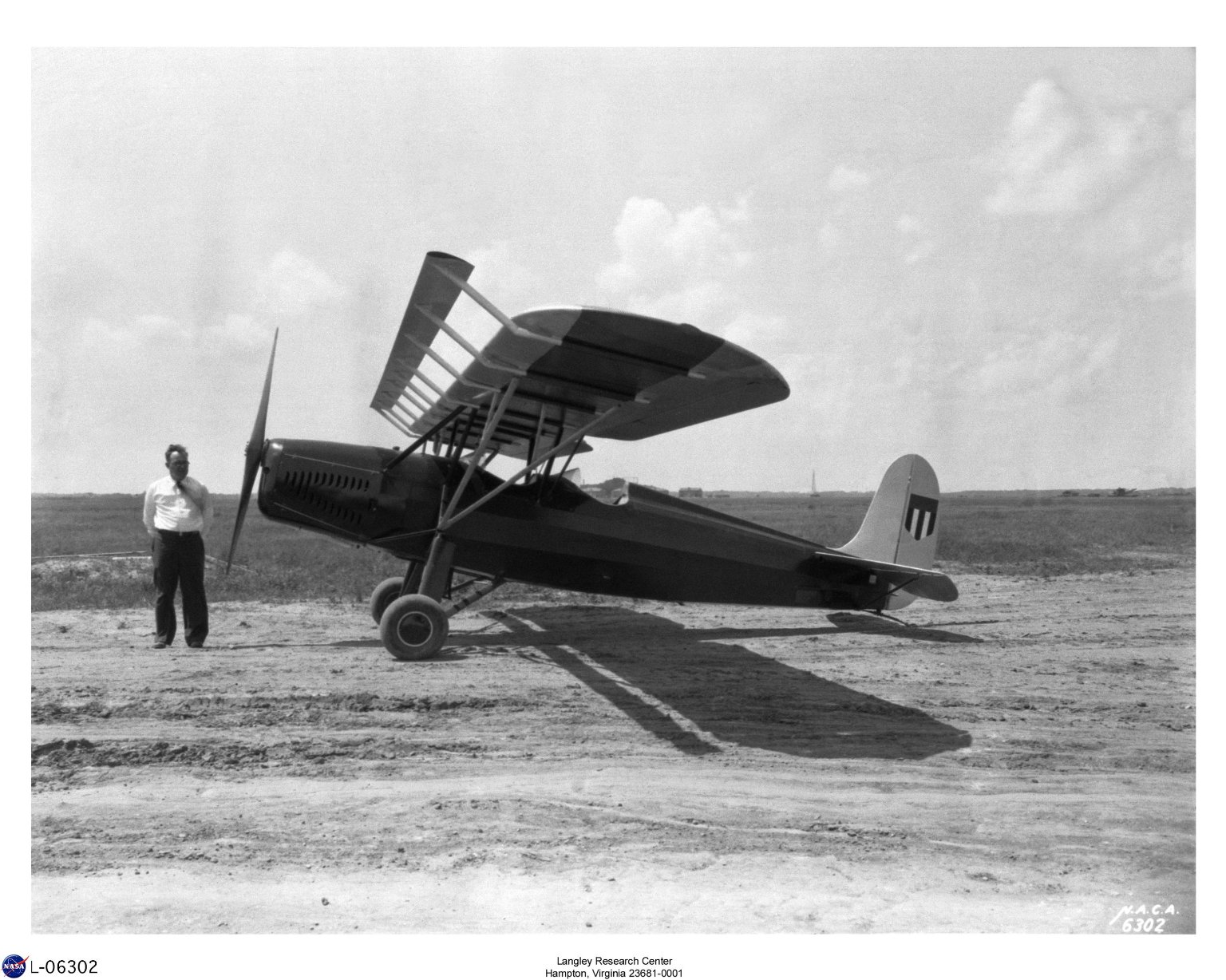
With a leading edge high lift device

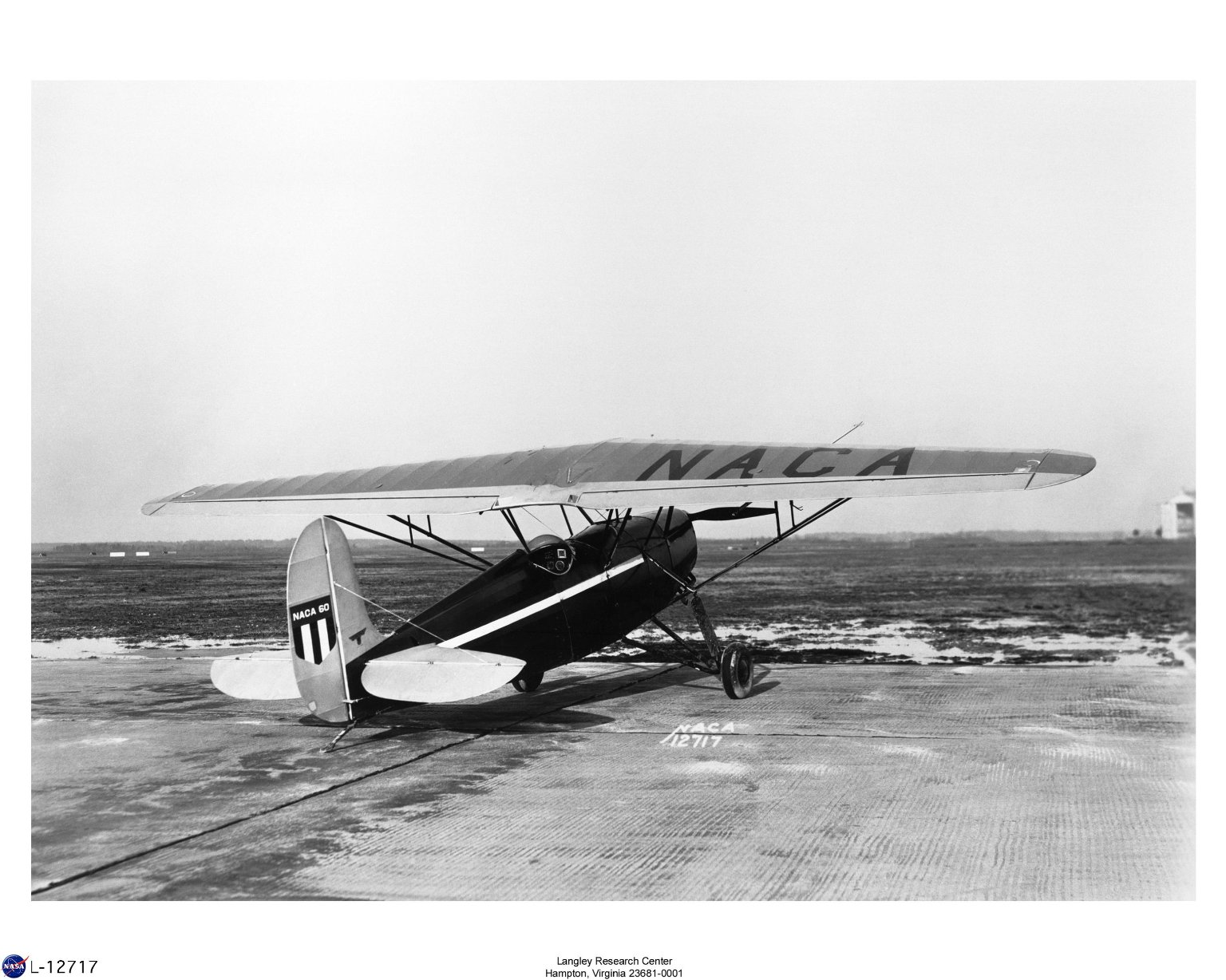

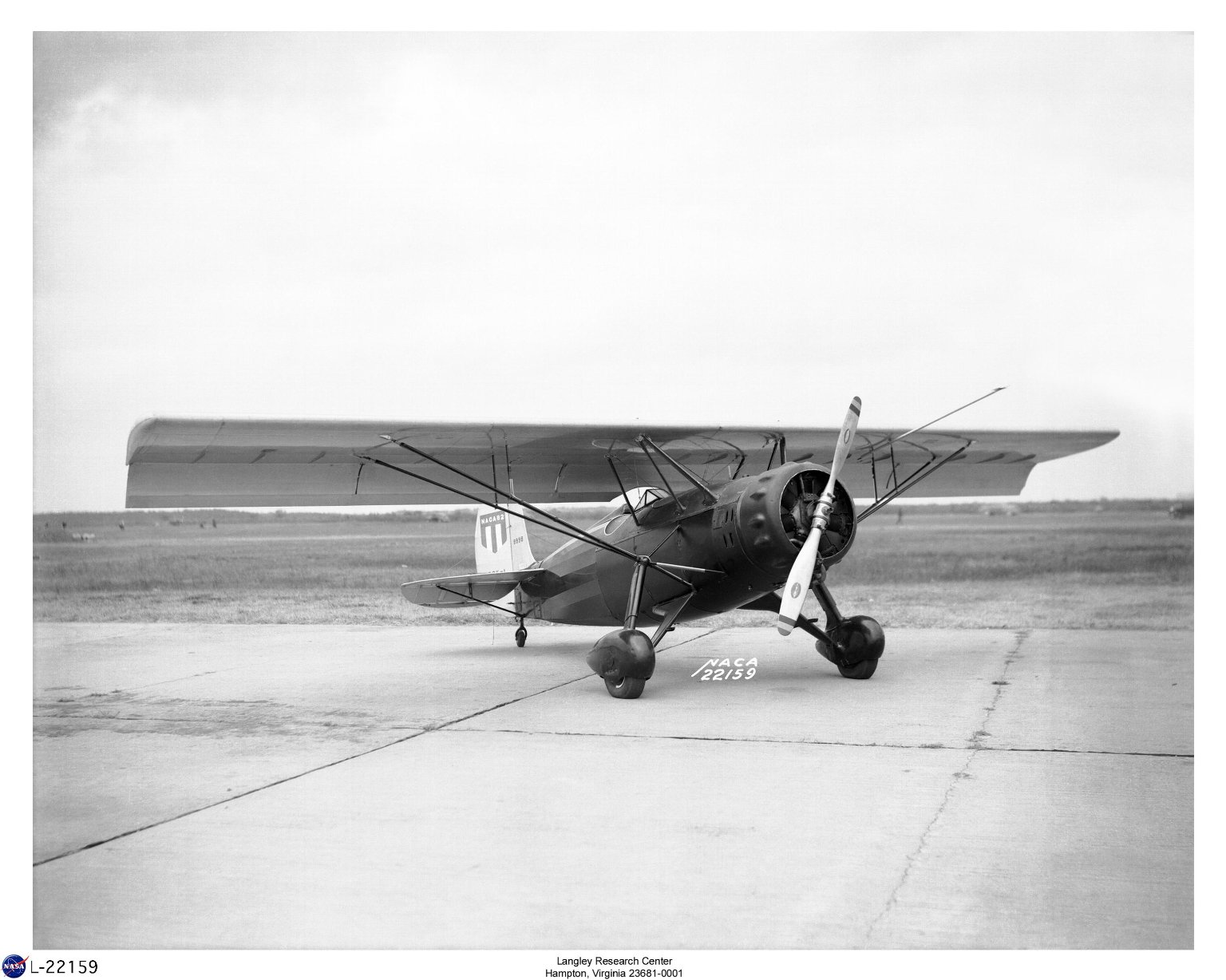

== Specifications (C7F) ==
Data from The Illustrated Encyclopedia of Aircraft (Part Work 1982-1985), 1985, Orbis Publishing, Page 1640

General characteristics

- Crew: two
- Length: 22 ft 3 in (6.78 m)
- Wingspan: 33 ft 0 in (10.06 m)
- Height: 7 ft 11 in (2.41 m)
- Wing area: 173 sq ft (16.07 m^{2})
- Empty weight: 1,102 lb (500 kg)
- Gross weight: 1,750 lb (794 kg)
- Powerplant: 1 × Warner Super Scarab 7-cylinder radial piston engine , 145 hp (108 kW)

Performance

- Maximum speed: 133 mph (214 km/h, 116 kn)
- Range: 350 mi (563 km, 300 nmi)
- Service ceiling: 20,000 ft (6,095 m)

== Operators ==
Colombia

- Colombian Air Force
