= Cessna Airmaster =

Family of American Aircraft built by Cessna

Airmaster
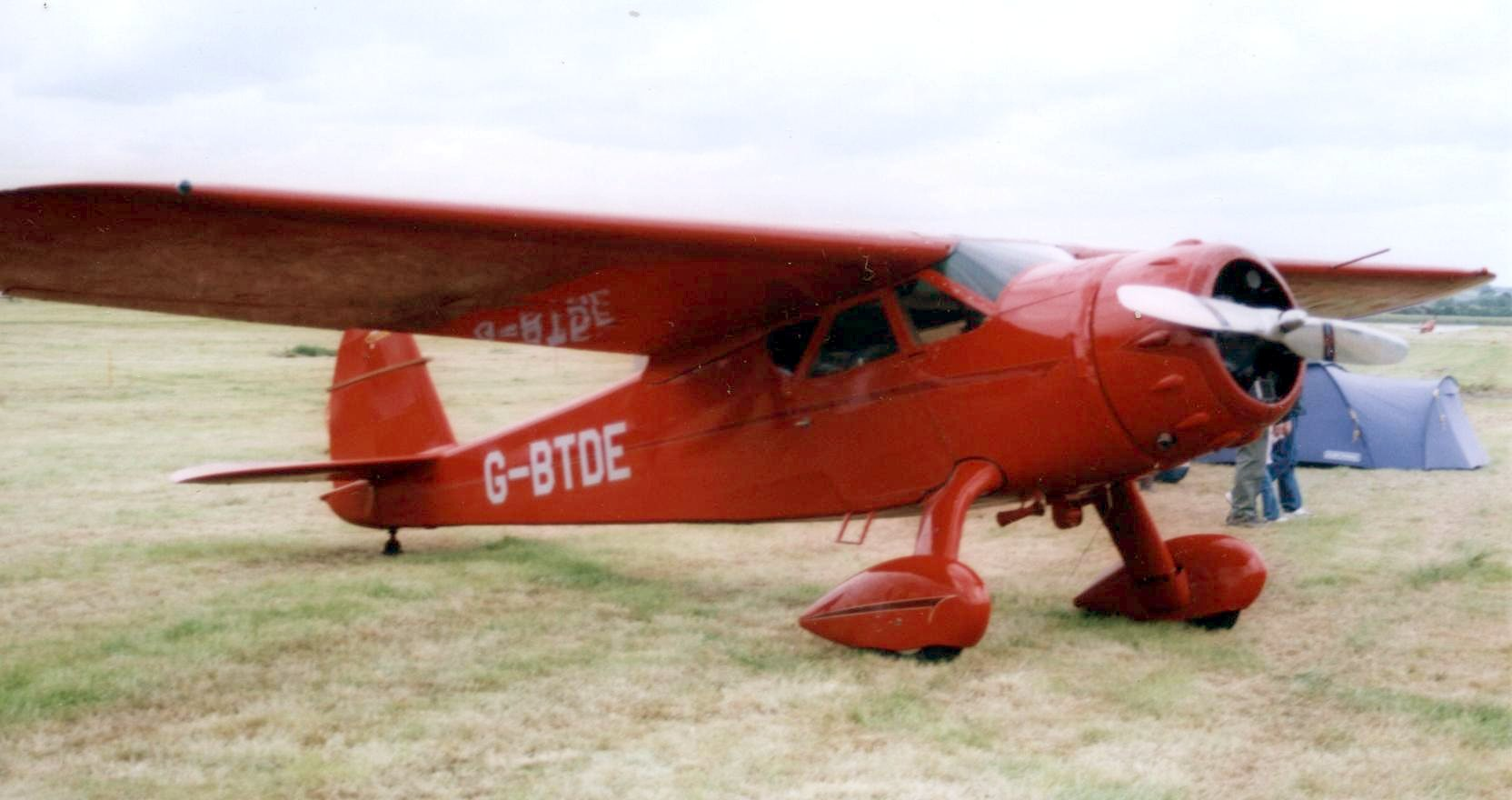
- A C-165 Airmaster in May 2006

General information
- Type: Civil aircraft
- Manufacturer: Cessna
- Number built: 183

History
- Introduction date: 1930s
- First flight: August 19, 1934

The Cessna Airmaster, is a family of single-engined aircraft manufactured by the Cessna Aircraft Company. The Airmaster played an important role in the revitalization of Cessna in the 1930s after the crash of the aviation industry during the Great Depression.

== Development ==
=== Origins ===
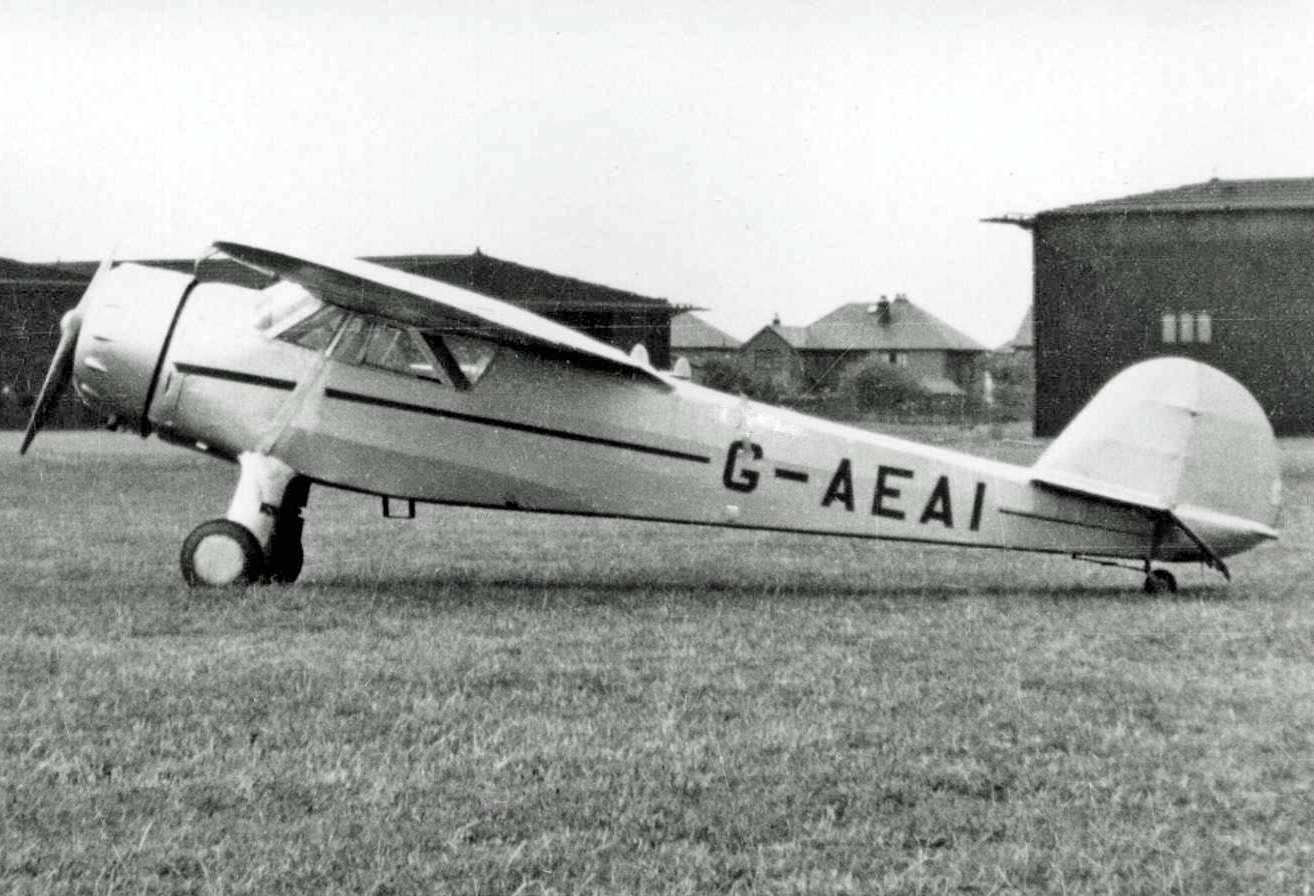
1936-built Cessna C-34 Airmaster at Blackpool (Squires Gate) Airport in 1950

In the mid-1930s, nearing the end of the Great Depression, the American economy began to slowly strengthen. Dwane Wallace (founder Clyde Cessna's nephew who was a recent college graduate in aeronautical engineering) decided to assist his uncle and cousin, Eldon Cessna (Clyde's son), in building more modern airplanes for Cessna Aircraft. On March 5, 1934, Clyde Cessna announced that the company’s next aircraft would be the C-34, which had been designated as such to mark the rebirth of the company that same year. Wallace worked closely with two newly-hired aeronautical engineers, Jerry Gerteis and Tom Salter, to quickly progress the detail design phase, permtting component fabrication to commence prior to the end of that same month. Before the start of summaer, the design of both the fuselage and cabin were nearing completion while the configuration of the aircraft's cantilever wing was close to being finalised as well.

The C-34's airframe drew upon the design of the Cessna Model AW. The AW's main landing gear comprised a mixture of welded steel tubing and elastic bungee cords was dispensed with in faovur of a fully-cantilevered arrangement. The wing used a NACA (National Advisory Committee on Aeronautics) 2412 airfoil section.

Due to a restricted number of available jigs and fixtures, the majority of the prototype had to be manufactured and assembled by hand; its construction was completed by August 9, 1934. One day later, it performed its maiden flight, which was reportedly uneventful. Not long after introduction of the C-34, Clyde Cessna retired from the aircraft industry, leaving the company to his nephew. By late 1935, Cessna was producing three C-34s each month nad, by the end of 1936, 42 C-34s had been delivered while demand for the type reportedly remained study despite the market being highly competitive at that time.

=== Further development ===
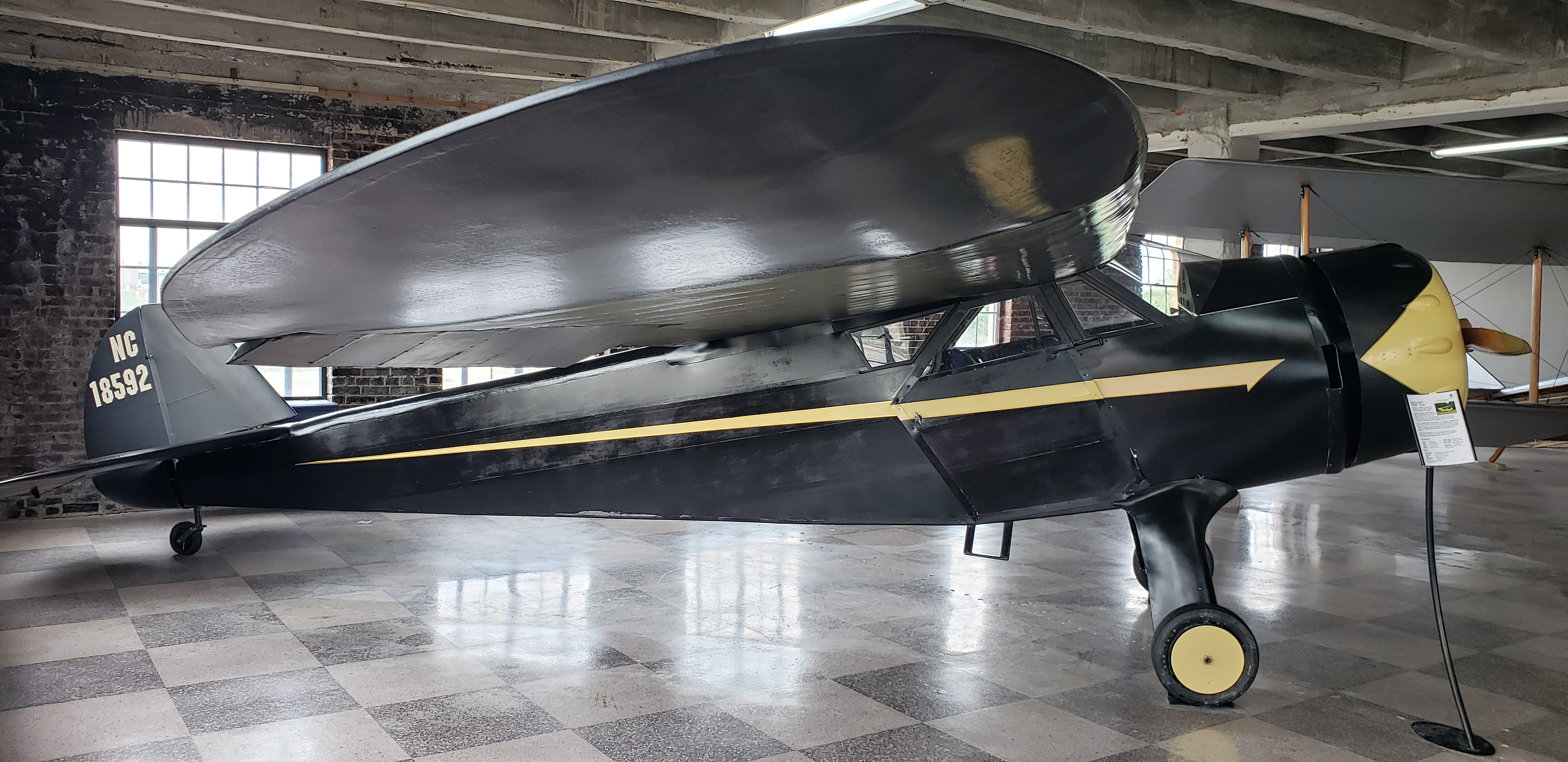
Cessna C-37 on display at the Kansas Aviation Museum

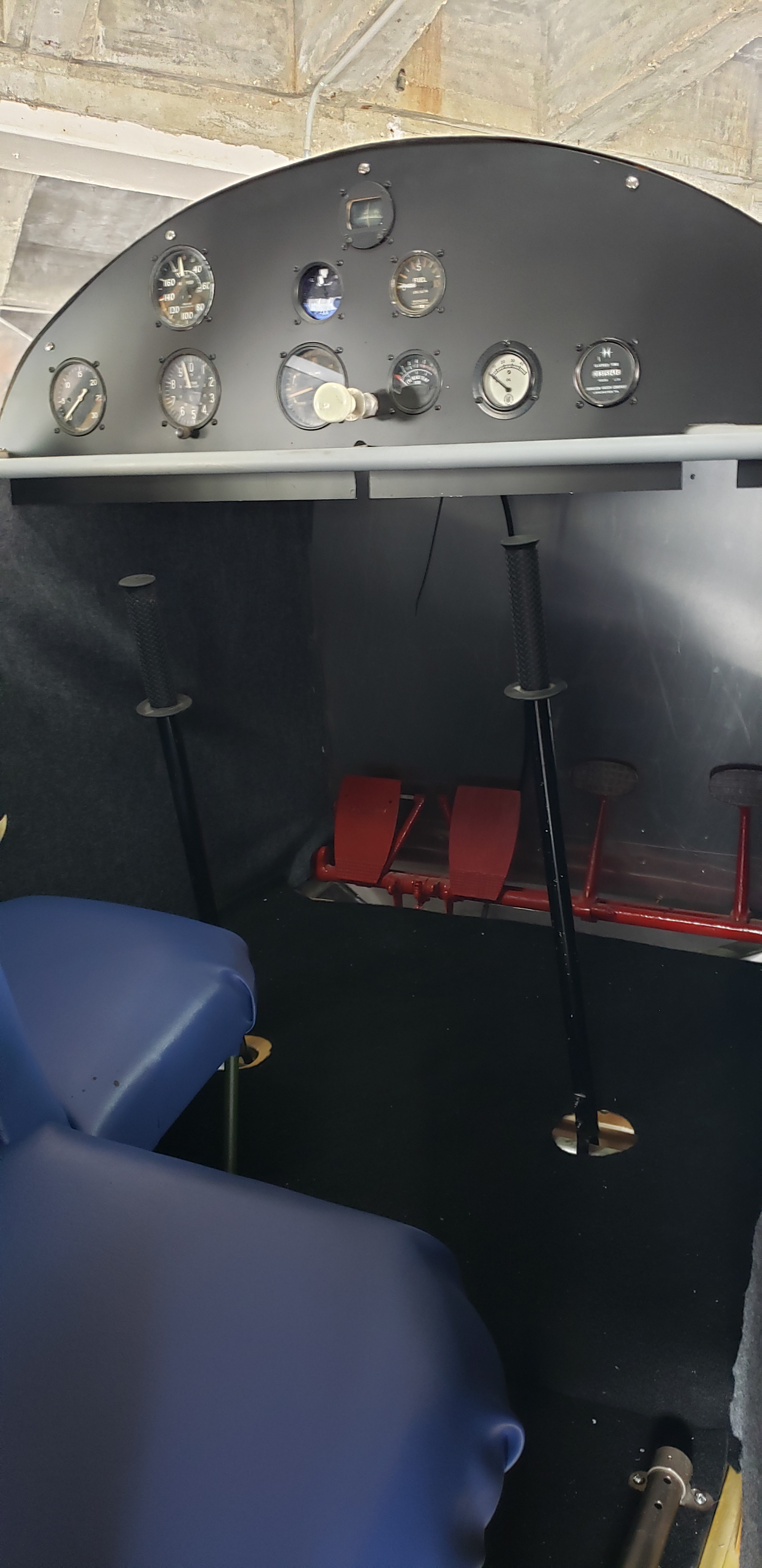
Cessna C-37 cockpit

The original Airmaster, the C-34, evolved into more advanced versions of the Airmaster. Wallace and Salter had examined the design to indentify potential points of improvement; one conclusion was that the cabin's comfort level could be increased by redesigning the flaps along with refinements to the main landing gear. Accordingly, the C-37 had a wider cabin, improved landing gear and electrically-actuated flaps. The C-38 had a taller vertical tail, curved main gear legs and a landing flap under the fuselage. Changes common to both the C-37 and C-38 included wider fuselages and landing gear along with rubber engine mounts to hold the 145 hp (108 kW) Warner Super Scarab engine. The final revisions of the C-34 were the C-145 and the C-165, of which 80 were built. On these models, the belly flaps added on the C-38 were removed and the overall length of the fuselage was increased. The only difference between the C-145 and C-165 was the engine horsepower, with the latter having an upgraded 165 hp (123 kW) Warner engine.

It was with the beginning of World War II that the Airmaster line came to an end. The welded tubular fuselage, fabric-covered body, extensive woodwork, wooden wings and radial engines, all characteristic of 1930s-era aircraft technology, became too expensive and slow to produce. It proved to be a relatively labor intensive aircraft to produce. The Airmaster, along with similar contemporaries, were promptly replaced with aircraft constructed from aluminium with strut braced wings, first seen in the Cessna 120.

== Design ==
The design of the C-34 incorporates characteristics that were borrowed from previous models of Cessna Aircraft. These similarities include the high mounted cantilever wing and the narrow design of the cabin windows. The wings and tail surfaces were composed entirely of wood while the fuselage was structured with steel tubing coupled with wooden stringers and formers. Both C-145 and C-165 models were offered with floats. An unintended benefit of the flap actuation mechanism is that the flaps could not be extended at too great a speed, as the motor could not overcome the excessively high aerodynamic forces inherently present.

One atypical feature of the Airmaster was its use of heel brakes, which have to be carefully handled to actuate the aircraft's mechanical brakes via cables. Its tailwheel was not steerable but was full-swiveling and could be locked. It has a highly effective rudder; a typical turn in an Airmaster would be initiated with the rudders and augemented by the ailerons. The stick forces are relatively high even when flying at slow speeds, requiring fairly aggressive trimming to manage. The aircraft also possessed atypical stall characteristics that could easily and quickly lead into a spin. In flight, the Airmaster was relatively undemanding and stable, to the extent that the type proved to be well suited to aerial photography, although the controls were not particularly responsive.

The cabin of the Airmaster was relatively crampt and austere; the pilot's head was positioned directly ahead of the wing spar. The layout of this cabin comprised a pair of forward seats and a rear bench, the latter being capable of seating up to two occupants, permtting up to three passengers to be carried along with the pilot. Directly aft of this rear bench was a compact baggage compartment that could accommodate up to 64 pounds of personal possessions or small freight. The walls of the cabin were fitted with soundproofing materials along with air vents to cool the interior, heat could also be drawn from the exhaust manifold to warm the cabin during cold weather.

Fuel was stored across three tanks, accomidating 17.5 gallons in each of the wing tanks along with a further 10 gallons in the auxiliary tank within the ceiling of the cabin (which was gravity-fed into the left wing tank); time-consuming 'doorbell'-type fuel indicators were used to chekc their current levels during flight. The engine was limited to only one minute at full power and that was no direct propeller control. Later-built aircraft were fitted with rubber engine mounts that reduced vibration from the engine being conveyed across the airframe.

== Variants ==
C-34
Four-seat light cabin aircraft, powered by a 145-hp (108-kW) Warner Super Scarab radial piston engine; 42 built.
C-37
Cabin widened by 12.7 cm (5 in), fitted with improved landing gear and electrically operated flaps; 46 built.

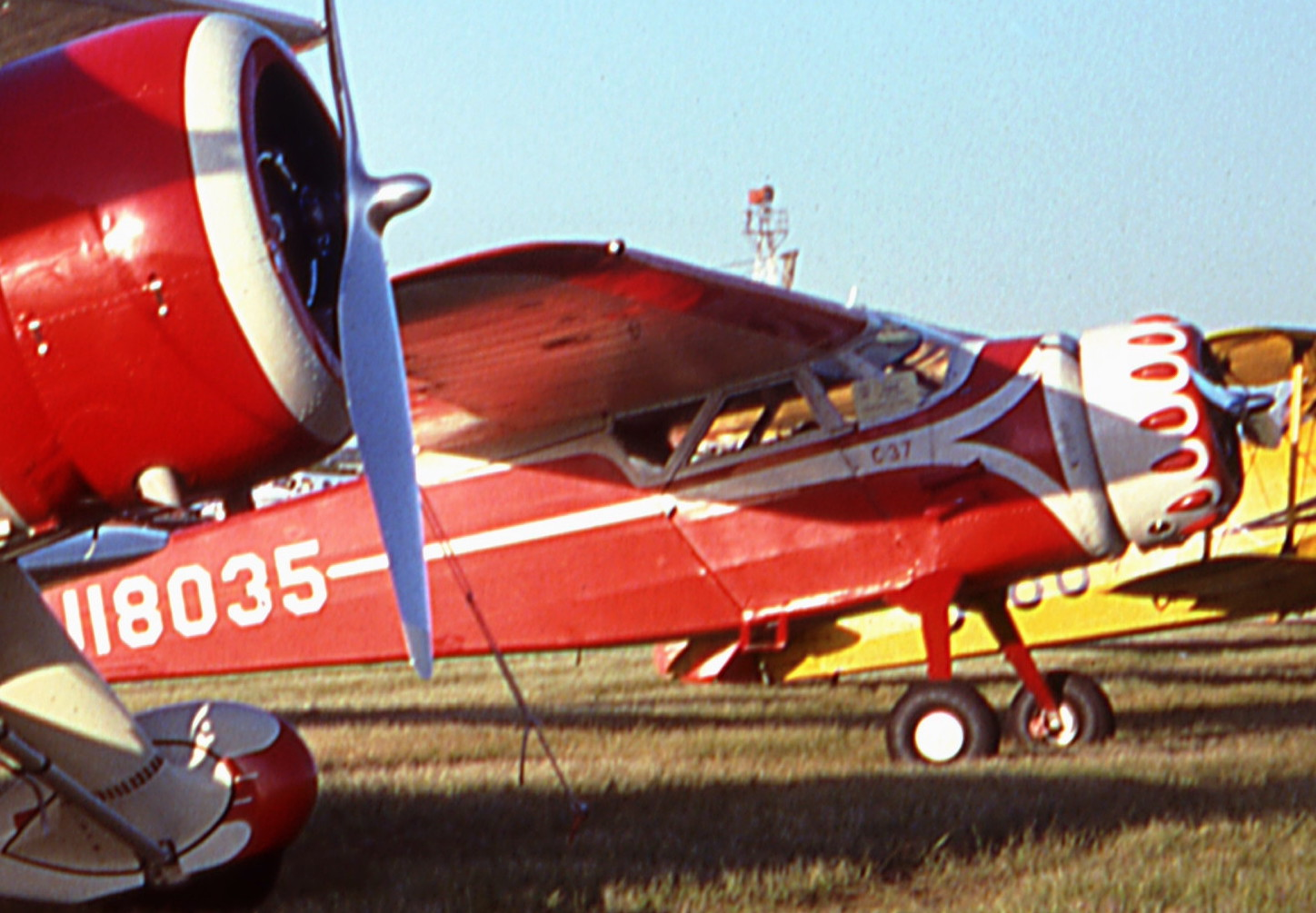
Cessna C-37 Airmaster, EAA fly-in, Denton, Texas, 1978.

C-38
Fitted with wide landing gear with curved legs, plus a taller vertical tail and a landing flap under the fuselage; 16 built.
C-39
Original designation of the Cessna C-145.
C-145
Powered by a 145-hp (108-kW) Warner Super Scarab radial piston engine.
C-165
Powered by a 165-hp (123-kW) Warner Super Scarab radial piston engine.
C-165D
Powered by a 175-hp (130-kW) Warner Super Scarab radial piston engine.
UC-77B
Two Cessna C-34s impressed into service with the United States Army Air Forces (USAAF) during World War II.
UC-77C
One Cessna C-37 impressed into service with the USAAF in 1942.
UC-77D
Four Cessna C-37s impressed into service with the USAAF in 1942.
UC-94
Three Cessna C-165s impressed into service with the USAAF in 1942.

== Operators ==
=== Military operators ===
Australia

- Royal Australian Air Force

Finland

- Finnish Air Force

United States

- United States Army Air Forces

== Specifications ==
3-view line drawing of the Cessna C-37

Data from American Aircraft Specifications

General characteristics

- Crew: 1
- Capacity: 3 passengers
- Length: 24 ft 10 in (7.57 m)
- Wingspan: 33 ft 10 in (10.31 m)
- Height: 7 ft 3 in (2.21 m)
- Wing area: 180 sq ft (17 m^{2})
- Empty weight: 1,300 lb (590 kg)
- Gross weight: 2,220 lb (1,007 kg)
- Fuel capacity: 35 US gal (29 imp gal; 130 L)
- Powerplant: 1 × Warner Super Scarab seven-cylinder radial engine, 145 hp (108 kW)

Performance

- Maximum speed: 162 mph (261 km/h, 141 kn) at sea level
- Cruise speed: 143 mph (230 km/h, 124 kn)
- Stall speed: 47 mph (76 km/h, 41 kn)
- Range: 550 mi (890 km, 480 nmi)
- Service ceiling: 18,900 ft (5,800 m)
- Rate of climb: 1,000 ft/min (5.1 m/s)

== See also ==
Aircraft of comparable role, configuration, and era

- de Havilland Canada DHC-2 Beaver
- Fairchild 24
- Howard DGA-15
- Monocoupe 90
- Noorduyn Norseman
- Stinson Reliant
- Waco Standard Cabin series

Related lists

- List of aircraft of World War II
