= Harold Frederick Pitcairn =

American aviation inventor (1897–1960)

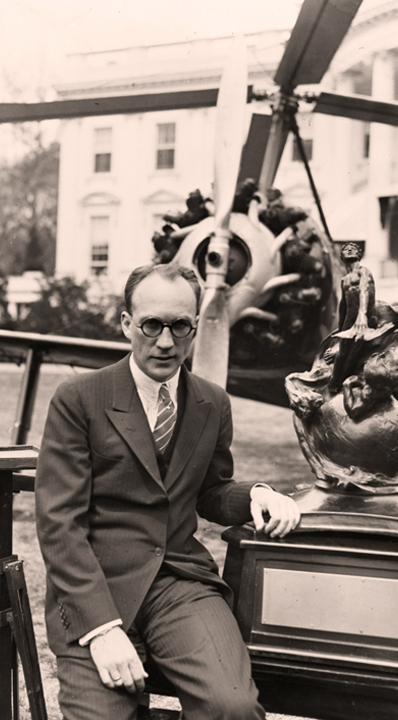
- Pitcairn in 1930 with the Collier Trophy at the White House
- Born: June 20, 1897; Bryn Athyn, Pennsylvania
- Died: April 23, 1960 (aged 62); Bryn Athyn, Pennsylvania
- Occupation: Aviation designer
- Spouse: Clara Davis
- Children: Joel, John, Charis, Stephen, Robert, Judith, Bruce, Edward
- Parents: John Pitcairn Jr.; Gertrude Pitcairn

Pennsylvania Historical Marker
- Official name: Harold F. Pitcairn
- Type: Roadside
- Designated: April 29, 1972
- Location: Buck & Tomlinson Rds., Bryn Athyn

A Pitcairn Mailwing displayed at the Air and Space Museum in Washington, D.C.

Harold Frederick Pitcairn (June 20, 1897 – April 23, 1960) was an American aviation inventor and pioneer. He played a key role in the development of the autogyro and founded the Autogiro Company of America. He patented a number of innovations relating to rotary wing aircraft.

== Biography ==
He was born to John Pitcairn, Jr. and Gertrude Starkey Pitcairn on 20 December 1897 in Bryn Athyn, Pennsylvania, and started attending the Academy of the New Church at the age of six.

Pitcairn's start in aviation was as an apprentice at Curtiss Aeroplane and Motor Company, in Hammondsport, during the summer of 1914. He then attended the Curtiss Flying School, in Newport News, during the summer of 1916.

After the death of his father, Harold enrolled in the Wharton School of Business, but enlisted in the United States Army Air Service after the United States entry into WWI. He received flight training at Rich Field, but received an honorable discharge with the end of the war. He then married Clara Davis on 21 January 1919, and became employed with the Pittsburgh Plate Glass Company. In 1923, while acting as the president of Owosso Sugar Company, Harold purchased a Farman Sport for his personal use.

Pitcairn founded Pitcairn Aviation (later to become Eastern Air Lines), and Pitcairn Aircraft Company which manufactured efficient airmail biplanes, and autogyros. Pitcairn hired Jim Ray as his chief pilot, and Agnew E. Larsen as his chief engineer, who in turn hired Harlan D. Fowler. On 2 November 1924, Pitcairn opened Pitcairn Field, located on his farm in Bryn Athyn. It included a 2,000 feet (610 m) runway, hangar, and Aero Club of Pennsylvania clubhouse. His fleet of planes included his Farman Sport, four Curtiss Orioles, a Standard Aircraft Corporation trainer, and two Martinsyde biplanes with enclosed cabins. Pitcairn started working on his first aircraft, the Pitcairn PA-1 Fleetwing, visited with Cierva in Madrid, and then filed his first of thirty rotary-wing patents on 2 March 1925.

His Pitcairn PA-2 Sesquiwing won the 1926 National Air Races in both the efficiency race, and the high-speed race. With that success, Pitcairn continued work on helicopters, on the Pitcairn-Brewer engine, developing an air-mail line, running a flight school at Hallowell/Willow Grove Pitcairn Field No. 2, and then developing the Pitcairn PA-3 Orowing. On 28 January 1927, Pitcairn was awarded Contract Air Mail Route 19, CAM-19, an overnight mail route from New York to Atlanta, a distance of 760 miles (1,220 km), and then on 19 November he was awarded the Atlanta-Miami route, CAM-25. The aircraft he built to carry the mail, his Pitcairn Mailwing, first flew on 17 June. By the end of 1927, Pitcairn's company had sold 23 PA-3 Orowings, 5 Pitcairn PA-4 Fleetwing IIs, and 12 PA-5 Mailwings, flown 20,000 sight-seeing passengers, had 200 flight students, and operated 23 airplanes with 35 pilots. By January 1929, Pitcairn Aviation was the fourth largest mail carrier in terms of income, and the third largest interms of miles flown.

After test flying a Cierva C.8 in England first, Pitcairn purchased one modified to use a Wright J-5 engine. On 18 December 1928, Pitcairn made the first flight on an autogyro in America at his Bryn Athyn field. On 14 February 1929, Pitcairn then bought the U.S. rights to Juan de la Cierva's inventions and patents for $300,000. The Pitcairn and Cierva entities would collaborate technically, while all resulting patents in the U.S. would reside with Pitcairn Aeronautics, Inc., which was later renamed Pitcairn-Cierva Autogiro Company of America, Inc. (PCA). Licenses were granted to Buhl Aircraft Company and Kellett Autogiro Corporation in 1931.

On 12 June 1929, Pitcairn sold Pitcairn Aviation, Inc. to the Curtiss-Keys Group for $2.5 million. The deal included the air-mail route, the fixed base operations at New York, Richmond, Greensboro, Spartanburg, Atlanta, and Miami, while Pitcairn retained his Willow Grove flying field, the Athyn factory, and the Pitcairn-Cierva Autogiro Company.

He was awarded the Collier Trophy in 1930 for the "development and application of the Autogiro and the demonstration of its possibilities with a view to its use for safe aerial transport." USA President Hoover awarded the trophy on the lawn of the White House in 1931, where a Pitcairn PCA-2 landed as the first aircraft ever. In 1931 Cierva and Pitcairn won the John Scott Medal for inventing and developing the autogyro respectively. By the end of the year, Pitcairn had produced 24 PCA-2s and 17 Pitcairn PAA-1s.

On 1 March 1932, the Pitcairn PA-18 was ready for flight testing. Then on 19 October 1932, Pitcairn introduced the largest autogyro ever built, the Pitcairn PA-19, complete with cabin. Pitcairn then began testing his Pitcairn PA-22, with direct control of lateral and longitude movement. According to Frank Kingston Smith Sr., "For the first time, a Pitcairn Autogiro would have no stubby wings, no ailerons, no elevators, just a rudder. All pitch and roll control would be provided by the 'orientable hub,' a swivelling spindle controlled by an upside-down stick hanging from the cabin ceiling."

At the end of 1933, Pitcairn was forced to close his Willow Grove factory, end all commercial operations, and terminate his work force, keeping only a small research and development staff. On 26 October 1936, Pitcairn delivered his AC-35 to win the Department of Commerce competition for a rotary aircraft capable of flying 100 miles per hour (160 km/h), take off from a 30 square feet (2.8×10^{−6} km^{2}) area, then fold its wings in a "roadable" configuration. Then in 1938, Cierva Autogiro announced it was abandoning the autogiro business, concentrating on developing a helicopter with the Cierva W.5.

In a failed attempt to win funds available from the Dorsey-Logan Act for rotorcraft development, Pitcairn developed the PA-36. He subcontracted the Luscombe Aircraft Company to build the fuselage, while his Autogiro Company built the rotor control system. Referred to as the Pitcairn Whirlwing, the aircraft was being tested by October 1939. Demonstrations were made to the military in October 1940, and then again at several military bases in February 1941. However, by this time, the military wanted an aircraft that could hover.

During WWII, Pitcairn formed the Pitcairn-Larsen Autogiro Company with Agnew E. Larsen to develop seven PA-39s for the Royal Navy. These were PA-18 airframes retrofitted with the direct-control, jump-takeoff rotor system.

On 22 July 1943 offered the Army Air Forces Materiel Command a reduced royalty "on machines and equipment supplied to the United States Government by our licensees, we will reduce our royalty from 5% on the basis of fully-equipped machines to eighty-five one-hundredths of one per cent (.85%) of the [government] contract price." The arrangement included the period of the war plus six months. At the time, the Autogiro Company of America held 164 patents, including the key patent 2,380,582 for fixed-spindle cyclic and collective pitch conjoint-systems in one rotor hub. Licensees included United Aircraft's Sikorsky R-4 supplied to the army in May 1942.

In 1943, Pitcairn sold Pitcairn Field to the U.S. Navy, which converted it into the Willow Grove Naval Air Station.

Pitcairn, and Autogiro Company of America engineers, helped Firestone build their Firestone XR-9 single seat helicopter, and the subsequent two seat XR-9B.

Noting that Bell Helicopter was infringing Autogiro Company of America patents, Pitcairn filed suit against the United States of America on 21 September 1951, since the government undertook legal responsibility for any patent infringement in their contracts.

In 1967, the United States Court of Claims found the government liable for patent infringement. It took 10 more years of litigation before the court computed the compensation to be paid by the government. Finally, in 1978, the Supreme Court declined to hear an appeal of that ruling. The U.S. had to pay $32,048,738 in compensation.

On April 23, 1960, he died from a gunshot to the head at his home CairnCrest in Bryn Athyn, Pennsylvania, shortly after a birthday celebration for his brother, Raymond Pitcairn. More sympathetic sources and the police report said the death was accidental and was caused by a faulty Savage Model 1907 0.32 automatic pistol.

== Legacy ==
In 1977, 17 years after his death, the Supreme Court of the United States awarded Pitcairn $32 million (equivalent to $170 million in 2025) from the US government for rotorcraft control surfaces patents used by military rotorcraft.

Pitcairn was enshrined in the National Aviation Hall of Fame in 1995.
