= 1931 in aviation =

This is a list of aviation-related events from 1931:

== Events ==
- Bert Hinkler flies a de Havilland Puss Moth from Canada to New York City, then non-stop 2,400 km (1,500 mi) to Jamaica, then on to British Guiana and Brazil. He then flies across the South Atlantic Ocean to West Africa in extremely bad weather, becoming the first person to fly across the South Atlantic solo and only the second person after Charles Lindbergh in 1927 to fly solo across the Atlantic. He completes his journey by flying from West Africa to London. For the flight, he receives the Segrave Trophy, the Johnston Memorial Prize, and the Britannia Trophy for the most meritorious flying performance of the year.
- Manufacturer Airspeed Ltd founded in York, England.
- Alexander Seversky founds the Seversky Aircraft Corporation.
- Watanabe Iron Works, the ancestor of the Kyūshū Airplane Company Ltd., begins to manufacture aircraft.
- Franco-British Aviation (FBA) ceases aircraft design and development, the victim of a lack of civilian orders for its aircraft since the end of World War I. The company had been founded in 1913.
- The first Bendix trophy race takes place.
- The Imperial Japanese Navy decides to abolish its airship units and phase airships out of the fleet over the next few years.
- In New York City, the Empire State Building is completed, topped with a 200-foot (61-meter) mooring mast for airships. Plans to disembark airship passengers prove impractical, and the mast is never used except for a single three-minute contact by the United States Navy blimp J-4.
- Spring 1931 – At the Langley Memorial Aeronautical Laboratory at Langley Field in Hampton, Virginia, the National Advisory Committee for Aeronautics (NACA) begins the operation of the Full-Scale Tunnel, a wind tunnel large enough to give researchers the ability to test the performance of actual aircraft.
- Summer 1931 – Transcontinental and Western Air moves its headquarters from New York City to Kansas City, Missouri.

=== January ===
- The United States Army and United States Navy agree that the responsibility for air defense of the coasts of the United States and its overseas territories shall lie with the United States Army Air Corps.
- In the Soviet Union, construction of Leningrad's Shosseynaya Airport (the future Pulkovo Airport) begins.
- Australian National Airways (ANA), the first airline of that name, expands its route system, beginning service to Launceston and Hobart in Tasmania.
- January 6 – Italian General Italo Balbo leads the first formation flight across the South Atlantic. Twelve Savoia-Marchetti S.55s fly from Portuguese Guinea to Brazil.
- January 7 – Guy Menzies flies the first solo non-stop trans-Tasman flight (from Australia to New Zealand) in 11 hours and 45 minutes, crash-landing his Avro Sports Avian on New Zealand's west coast.
- January 8 – Piarco Airport, the future Piarco International Airport, opens in Port-of-Spain, Trinidad.
- January 9 – The Pratt-MacArthur agreement defines the United States Navy's naval air force as an element of the fleet that moves with the fleet and helps it carry out its missions. The agreement settles a lengthy controversy between the United States Army and the Navy over the role of naval aviation in overall national defense, as well as internal Navy debates over the role of naval air power.
- January 28 – German explorer Gunther Plüschow and his engineer Ernst Dreblow are killed when their Heinkel HD 24 seaplane crashes near the Brazo Rico (part of Argentino Lake) in Patagonia.

=== February ===
- Flying from Oran in French Algeria, the French aviators Antoine Paillard and Louis Mailloux fly a 15-kilometer (9.3-mile) circuit for over 50 hours in the Bernard 80 GR in an attempt to set a new unrefueled nonstop closed-circuit world distance record. They cover 8,168 kilometers (5,075 miles) before higher-than-expected fuel consumption forces them to land only 20 kilometers (12 miles) short of the record.
- February 1 – Polish pilot Stanisław Skarżyński begins a 25,050-kilometer (15,570-mile) tour around Africa in a PZL Ł.2. He will complete it on May 5.
- February 12
  - The Detroit News places an order for a Pitcairn PCA-2 autogyro with the Pitcairn Aircraft Company. It is the first commercial order for an autogyro in the United States.
  - A new regulation goes into effect in the United States requiring airlines with interstate flights to have a copilot on any aircraft flying a schedule of five or more hours with eight or more passengers aboard.
  - The United States Department of Commerce places a radio range beacon in continuous operation at Medicine Bow, Wyoming, completing the directional radio marking of the entire route from New York City to San Francisco, California.
- February 14 – The United States Congress authorizes a new award, the Air Mail Medal of Honor, which the President of the United States is to award to pilots who perform distinguished service in connection with U.S. Air Mail service. It will first be awarded in December 1933.
- February 20 – The United States Senate ratifies the Havana Convention, in which 21 Western Hemisphere countries guarantee the right of innocent passage of aircraft without discrimination. The Convention also formulates the rules for international air navigation between the signatory countries relating to the marking of aircraft, landing facilities, prohibited transport, competency of airmen, and the right of each country to prescribe the route to be flown over its territory.
- February 21 – After a Pan American-Grace Airways (Panagra) Ford Trimotor lands at Rodríguez Ballón Airport at Arequipa, Peru, armed revolutionary soldiers surround it. They demand that it fly them to another destination, but the Trimotor's pilot refuses. The standoff continues for 10 days until, on 2 March, the soldiers suddenly announce that their side won the revolution and let the pilot go in exchange for him giving one of them a ride to Lima.
- February 26 – Imperial Airways begins scheduled services between England and Africa using Armstrong Whitworth Argosys.
- February 6-March 1 – Flying the Blériot 110 over a closed circuit in French Algeria, the French aviator Maurice Rossi sets an unrefueled distance record of 8,822 kilometers (5,482 miles). The plane remains in the air for over 75 hours 23 minutes.

=== March ===
- The French aviator Marcel Goulette flies a Farman F.304 trimotor from Paris, France, to Tananarive, Madagascar, and back.
- March 9 – Flying a Farman F.302, French aviators Jean Réginensi and Marcel Lalouette set new distance and duration records over a closed circuit with a 2,000-kilogram (4,409-pound) payload, flying 2,678 kilometers (1,664 miles) in 17 hours.
- March 21
  - Australia suffers its first airline disaster when the Australian National Airways Avro 618 Ten Southern Cloud disappears in bad weather over the Snowy Mountains in New South Wales, Australia, with the loss of all eight people on board. The aircraft's wreckage will not be discovered until October 26, 1958.
  - Zygmunt Puławski, one of Poland's leading aircraft designers, dies during the sixth flight of the PZL.12 flying boat prototype – which he designed and built – when the PZL.12 stalls after take-off due to a strong wind and crashes in Warsaw, Poland.
- March 23–24 (overnight) – The French aviators Joseph Le Brix and Marcel Doret take off from Istres, France, in the prototype Dewoitine D.33 and fly a triangular course from Istres to Montpellier to Nîmes. Although fog forces them to shorten their course during the night of 23–24 March, they remain aloft continuously for 32 hours 17 minutes over a distance of 4,662 kilometres (2,897 mi) at an average speed of 151.36 kilometres per hour (94.05 mph). The flight sets seven new world records, for both duration and distance by an aircraft carrying a load of 500 kilograms (1,102 lb), both duration and distance by an aircraft carrying a load of 1,000 kilograms (2,205 lb), both duration and distance by an aircraft carrying a load of 2,000 kilograms (4,409 lb), and average speed by an aircraft over a distance of 2,000 kilometres (1,242.7 mi).
- March 26 – Ad Astra Aero and Balair merge to form Swissair.
- March 30–April 2 – Flying the Benard 80 GR, French aviators Jean Marmoz and Antoine Paillard set a new closed-circuit unrefueled flight distance record, covering 8,960 kilometers (5,570 miles) in a time of 52 hours 44 minutes. A loss of coolant finally brings the flight to an end, although during the last part of the flight the two men pump champagne, eau de Vittel, and coffee into the radiator to keep the engine cool.
- March 31 – A Transcontinental & Western Air Fokker F-10A crashes near Bazaar, Kansas, killing all eight on board, including American football coach Knute Rockne.

=== April ===
- April 8 – Flying a Pitcairn PCA-2 over Willow Grove, Pennsylvania, Amelia Earhart sets an autogiro altitude record, reaching 18,415 feet (5,613 meters).
- April 10 – C. W. A. Scott breaks the record for the fastest solo flight from England to Australia, making the flight between April 1 and April 10 in a time of 9 days 4 hours 11 minutes.
- April 14 – Honduras founds its National Aviation School. It is the forerunner of the Honduran Air Force.
- April 21 – Pitcairn-Cierva Autogiro Company pilot Jim Ray lands a Pitcairn PCA-2 autogiro on the White House lawn in Washington, D.C., for a ceremony in which U.S. President Herbert Hoover presents the Collier Trophy to autogiro manufacturer Harold Pitcairn. After the ceremony, Ray takes off again in the PCA-2.

=== May ===
- May 4 – The first grounding of an aircraft type takes place when the United States Department of Commerce's Aeronautics Branch orders all Fokker F-10A aircraft out of passenger service after an investigation of the March 31 crash of a Transcontinental & Western Air Fokker F-10A discloses defective wing construction. Although most of the grounded planes eventually return to service, the loss of public confidence in the Fokker F-10A and the costly periodic inspection the Aeronautics Branch imposes on operators of it leads to the demise of the once-popular airplane.
- May 5 – Polish pilot Stanisław Skarżyński completes a 25,050-kilometer (15,570-mile) tour around Africa in a PZL Ł.2. He began the tour on February 1.
- May 14 – A de Havilland Gypsy Moth piloted by professional hunter Denys Finch Hatton and carrying his Kĩkũyũ servant Kamau takes off from the airfield at Voi, Kenya, circles the field twice, stalls, and crashes, killing both men.
- May 27 – Launching from Augsburg, Germany, Swiss professor Auguste Piccard and his assistant Paul Kipfer ascend to an altitude of 15,781 meters (51,775 feet) in a balloon, establishing a new world altitude record for human flight and gathering substantial data on the upper atmosphere and cosmic rays before landing on a glacier in Austria.
- May 28
  - Walter E. Lees and Frederick Brossy set a new endurance record for a non-refueled flight, landing a Bellanca J2 Diesel aircraft at Jacksonville Beach, Florida, after remaining in the air continuously for 84 hours 32 minutes. The record will stand until July 1986.
  - Flying the Pitcairn PCA-2 autogyro Missing Link, John M. Miller completes the first flight across the United States in a rotary-wing aircraft.

=== June ===
- June 5 – C. W. A. Scott breaks the record for the fastest solo flight from Australia to England, flying the 10,660 miles (17,160 km) from Wyndham, Australia to Lympne, England from May 26 to June 5, in 10 days 23 hours piloting a DH.60 Moth (Gipsy II).
- June 11 – The 40-passenger Handley Page H.P.42 four-engine biplane enters service with British airline Imperial Airways when G-AAGX Hannibal operates a Croydon Airport to Paris–Le Bourget flight, setting new standards of passenger service and comfort.
- June 23 – Beginning a flight around the world, Wiley Post and Harold Gatty take off from Roosevelt Field on Long Island, New York, in the Lockheed 5C Vega Winnie Mae bound for their first stop at Harbour Grace in the Dominion of Newfoundland.
- June 30
  - Facing financial difficulties because of the Great Depression, an inability to procure an air mail contract, and the aftermath of the disappearance of one of its airliners in March, Australian National Airways (ANA), the first airline of that name, ceases scheduled services. Subsequently, it limits itself to operating joy flights, mostly around New South Wales, and offering pilot training services with a fleet of small aircraft.
- The United States Department of Commerce's Aeronautics Branch (predecessor of the Federal Aviation Administration) has issued 48 approved repair station certificates. The certificates entitle repair stations in the United States to repair aircraft of types for which they are adequately equipped, eliminating the previous requirement for them to submit to the Aeronautics Branch detailed drawings of the repairs they make to licensed aircraft and, in some cases, a stress analysis. It had begun issuing the certificates in March 1930.

=== July ===
- July 1
  - Wiley Post and Harold Gatty complete their flight around the world in the Lockheed 5C Vega Winnie Mae, returning to Roosevelt Field on Long Island, New York, in a record time of 8 days 15 hours 51 minutes. During the flight, they have made stops in the Dominion of Newfoundland, England, Germany, the Soviet Union (in both European Russia and Siberia), the Territory of Alaska, Canada, and Cleveland, Ohio.
  - United Air Lines is formally established as a management company coordinating four component air carriers that had already begun operating as a single entity.
- July 2 – Wiley Post and Harold Gatty are celebrated on Broadway for their round-the-world flight in what at the time was the largest ticker-tape parade in New York City's history.
- July 4 – The seventh and last Ford National Reliability Air Tour begins as its 14 entrants take off from Ford Airport in Dearborn, Michigan. The tour cross-markets Ford Motor Company and its Stout Metal Airplane Division and showcases Henry Ford's interest in aviation. For the first time, a rotary-wing aircraft — the Pitcairn PCA-2 autogiro Miss Champion — takes part in the event. Flying as an "accompanying" (i.e., non-competing) aircraft, it will make high-profile appearances with flight demonstrations at various cities along the tour route.
- July 15
  - The United States Army Air Corps's Air Corps Tactical School completes its relocation from Langley Field, Virginia, to Maxwell Field, Alabama.
  - Eastern Air Transport (the future Eastern Air Lines) purchases New York Airways.
  - The Hungarian aviators György Endresz (pilot) and Sándor Magyar (navigator) take off from Harbour Grace, Dominion of Newfoundland, in the Lockheed Model 8A Sirius Justice for Hungary to attempt a nonstop flight to Hungary. Despite thick fog, a compass that jams shortly after takeoff, and a mid-air engine failure, they reach the coast of Ireland in 13 hours 50 minutes — a new world record for a flight between North America and the Irish coast — and fly on toward Hungary, which they reach on 16 July. When the fuel flow to their engine is interrupted they make a forced landing at Bicske, 30 kilometres (19 mi) short of their planned destination at Mátyásföld, and arrive by car at Mátyásföld, where thousands of people greet them. The flight is the 15th successful transatlantic flight and the first to fly nonstop from North America so deep into Europe. It covers 5,770 kilometres (3,585 mi; 3,116 nmi) in 25 hours 20 minutes at a record average speed of 230 kilometres per hour (143 mph). Sponsored by the American-Hungarian Transatlantic Committee to draw attention to what Hungarian Americans view as the injustice of the Treaty of Trianon Hungary signed after its defeat in World War I, the flight also represents the first use of a transatlantic flight for political purposes.
- July 20 – The Boston and Maine Railroad and Maine Central Railroad found Boston-Maine Airways, the future Northeast Airlines. It flies from Boston, Massachusetts, to Bangor, Maine, via Portland, Maine, as a Pan American Airways contract carrier.
- July 22–September 1 – Sir Alan Cobham and crew make a 19,800 km (12,300 mi) return (i.e., round-trip) flight between England and the Belgian Congo in a Short Valletta.
- July 25 – The seventh and Ford National Reliability Air Tour concludes with the return of the participants to Dearborn, completing a 4,816-mile (4,185 nmi; 7,751 km) route with stops at Windsor, Ontario, Canada; Le Roy and Binghamton, New York; Bradford and Pittsburgh, Pennsylvania; Wheeling, West Virginia; Columbus, Ohio; Huntington, West Virginia; Middlesboro, Kentucky; Knoxville, Nashville, and Memphis, Tennessee; Birmingham and Montgomery, Alabama; Gulfport, Mississippi; New Orleans and Shreveport, Louisiana; Houston, Corpus Christi, San Antonio, and Fort Worth, Texas; Oklahoma City and Ponca City, Oklahoma; Chanute, Kansas; Kansas City, Missouri; Lincoln and Omaha, Nebraska; St. Joseph, Missouri; Davenport, Iowa; Joliet, Illinois; Kalamazoo, Michigan; and Akron, Ohio. For the second straight year, Harry L. Russell finishes first in a Ford Trimotor. Flying a Cessna AW, Eddie August Schneider overcomes falling into last place due to a three-day in Kentucky and finishes third. Lowell Bayles, in a Gee Bee Sportster, finishes fourth overall but receives the Great Lakes Trophy for the fastest plane with an engine of 510 cubic inches (8,357 cubic centimetres) or less.
- July 27 – The Air Line Pilots Association, International is founded at a convention in Chicago, Illinois. The convention attendees vote to affiliate with the American Federation of Labor.
- July 28–31 – Russell Norton Boardman and John Louis Polando fly the Bellanca Special J-300 high-wing monoplane Cape Cod, registration NR761W, powered by a 300 hp (224 kW) Wright J-6 Whirlwind engine, nonstop from Floyd Bennett Field in New York City, to Istanbul, Turkey, in 49 hours 20 minutes, establishing a distance record of 5,011.8 miles (8,065.7 km). It is the first known non-stop flight to surpass either 5,000 miles or 8,000 kilometers.

=== August ===
- August 6 – Transcontinental and Western Air inaugurates the first air cargo service in the United States with a shipment of livestock from St. Louis, Missouri, to Newark, New Jersey.
- August 9 – After an engine separates from the American Airways Ford 5-AT-B Trimotor NC9662 shortly after takeoff from Cincinnati Municipal Airport in Cincinnati, Ohio, for a flight to Atlanta, Georgia, its pilot tries to return to the airport for an emergency landing. He misses the runway and then tries to land on the bank of the Little Miami River, but the aircraft strikes soft sand and noses over, killing all six people on board.
- August 10 – The American Federation of Labor formally grants affiliation to the Air Line Pilots Association, International, which becomes the largest trade union representing airline pilots.
- August 29 – The German dirigible Graf Zeppelin pioneers the air route between Germany and Brazil.

=== September ===
- The Latécoère 380 flying boat sets six world seaplane records, including three speed-with-load-over-distance records and a closed-circuit distance-with-load record of 2,208 kilometers (1,372 miles).
- The Royal Air Force's first instrument flying course begins. Held at RAF Wittering, it employs six Avro 504Ns fitted with blind-flying hoods, turn indicators, and reduced dihedral to decrease inherent stability.
- September 5 – At College Park, Maryland, an airplane makes the first instrument landing by a system incorporating a glide path, which is achieved by aligning an inclined radio beam with the runway, providing a path approximating the gliding angle of an airplane.
- September 7
  - Herbert Clayton Wells dies during an air contest in Ottumwa, Iowa.
  - Lowell Bayles wins the 1931 Thompson Trophy in the Gee Bee Model Z racer at the National Air Races in Cleveland, Ohio, with a speed of 236.24 mph (380.19 km/h).
- September 13 – The United Kingdom wins the Schneider Trophy outright by winning its third consecutive Schneider Trophy race. Royal Air Force Flight Lieutenant John Boothman of the RAF High-Speed Flight completes the course at Calshot Spit in Supermarine S.6B serial S1595 at 547.297 km/h (340.075 mph). With the trophy retired, the Schneider Trophy races, begun in 1913, come to an end.
- September 23 – A Pitcairn XOP-1 autogyro conducts landing and take-off trials aboard the United States Navy aircraft carrier USS Langley (CV-1). It is the U.S. Navy's first experiment with a shipborne rotary-wing aircraft.
- September 29
  - Following the Schneider Trophy success, Royal Air Force Flight Lieutenant George Stainforth in Supermarine S.6B serial S1596 breaks the 400 mph air speed record barrier at 407.5 mph (655.8 km/h).
  - American inventor Ed Link receives a patent for his "Combination Training Device for Student Aviators and Entertainment Apparatus." Better known as the Link Trainer, it allows pilots to train safely on the ground for "blind" instrument flying.

=== October ===
- October 1
  - KLM begins a regular service between Amsterdam and Batavia by Fokker F.XII. At 13,744 km (8,540 mi) this is the longest regular air route in the world at the time.
  - The United States Department of Commerce promulgates a regulation requiring that all scheduled air transports capable of carrying 15 or more passengers or having a gross takeoff weight of 15,000 lb (6,804 kg) or more have a cockpit crew of two, consisting of a pilot and a copilot.
- October 3 – Brazil reestablishes Brazilian Navy control over naval aviation, creating a naval aviation corps which takes over the control of naval aircraft from the general staff.
- October 3–5 – Clyde Pangborn and Hugh Herndon make the first non-stop flight across the Pacific Ocean and first nonstop flight from Japan to the United States, taking off 300 miles (483 km) north of Tokyo from Samushiro Beach and landing at Wenatchee, Washington, in Miss Veedol (registration NR796W), which is either a Bellanca CH-400 or Bellanca J-300 Long-Distance Special, according to different sources. The flight covers 4,448 miles (3,865 nmi; 7,158 km) in 41 hours 13 minutes. Pangborn and Herndon win a $25,000 prize offered by the Japanese newspaper Asahi Shimbun for the first nonstop transpacific flight.
- October 17 – The first hook-on test of the U.S. Navy's parasite fighter program takes places, as the Curtiss XF9C-1 prototype successfully docks with the dirigible USS Los Angeles (ZR-3).
- October 27 – The Detroit Aircraft Corporation files for bankruptcy. Eventually, the Lockheed portion of the company is bought out of receivership.
- October 27–28 – As a test of the second Fairey Long-Range Monoplane in preparation for a later attempt at setting a new non-stop distance flight record it, Royal Air Force Squadron Leader Oswald R. Gayford and Flight Lieutenant D. L. G. Bett fly from RAF Cranwell in England to RAF Abu Sueir in Egypt, covering 2,857 miles (4,598 kilometers) nonstop in 31 hours.

=== November ===
- The first production Tupolev R-6 rolls off the assembly line at the N22 factory in Moscow.
- Hillman's Airways is founded. It will begin charter services in December 1931 and scheduled services in April 1932.
- November 2 – United States Marine Corps squadrons VS-15M and VS-14M embark on USS Lexington (CV-2) and USS Saratoga (CV-3), the first time Marine Corps squadrons are assigned to aircraft carriers.
- November 20 – The Insular Government of the Philippines creates an office under its Department of Commerce and Communications to handle aviation matters in the Philippines, particularly the enforcement of rules and regulations governing commercial aviation and private flying.

=== December ===
- December 5 – Lowell Bayles, winner of the 1931 Thompson Trophy, dies when the Gee Bee Model Z racer he is piloting crashes during a speed run at Wayne County Airport in Detroit, Michigan.
- December 15 – The first autogyro with a propulsive rear motor, the Buhl A-1, makes its first flight.
- December 17–18 – In the sailplane Nighthawk, United States Army Air Corps Second Lieutenant William A. Cooke sets world gliding records for distance and enduance, flying an estimated 600 statute miles (966 km) in 21 hours 34 minutes 15 seconds along the Nuuanu Pali on Oahu in the Territory of Hawaii. During the hours of darkness, a battery of the United States Army's 64th Coast Artillery Regiment uses searchlights to light the cliff face for him.
- December 25 – Hillman's Airways begins flight operations with a charter flight. It will begin scheduled services in April 1932.
- December 29 – As the French aviators Louis Mailloux and Jean Marmoz take off in the Bernard 81 GR Antoine Paillard to attempt to set a new unrefueled non-stop closed-circuit flight distance record, the airplane's propeller hits the ground and its undercarriage collapses. The two men escape the accident with only a few bruises, and the aircraft eventually is repaired.

== First flights ==
- Aeronca C-1 Cadet
- ANF Les Mureaux 110A.2, prototype of ANF Les Mureaux 113R.2
- ANF Les Mureaux 112GR
- Arado Ar 65
- Arrow Active
- Avro 627 Mailplane
- Beriev MBR-2
- Curtiss-Wright CW-14 Osprey
- Dewoitine D.35
- Dewoitine HD.412
- Douglas XT3D
- Fairchild 22
- Farman F.250
- FBA 290
- Focke-Wulf A 38
- Latécoère 300
- Latécoère 440
- Lockheed YP-24
- Nakajima Army Type 91 fighter
- Pitcairn PAA-1
- Pitcairn PCA-2
- Westland-Hill Pterodactyl Mk. IV
- Mid-1931 – Grigorovich I-Z
- Autumn 1931 – Stinson Model R

=== February ===
- Bernard 74-01
- Couzinet 21
- Farman F.280
- PZL.12 flying boat prototype - designed and built by leading Polish aircraft designer Zygmunt Puławski, the PZL.12 stalls and crashes in Warsaw during its sixth flight a month later on 21 March just after take-off due to a strong wind, killing Zygmunt
- Westland PV-3
- ca. late February – Potez 40
- February 2 – Latécoère 350

=== March ===
- Curtiss XF9C-1, prototype of the Curtiss F9C Sparrowhawk
- Latécoère 490
- March 3
  - Fairey Gordon
  - Northrop Beta
- March 9 – Blériot 125 F-ALZD
- March 10 – Bernard H.V.42
- March 25 – Hawker Fury
- March 28 – Mitsubishi 2MR8

=== April ===
- Amiot 130
- Dewoitine D.28
- April 12 – Amiot 140
- April 13 – Boeing Model 215, later redesignated the Boeing YB-9, the first all-metal monoplane bomber designed for the United States Army Air Corps

=== May ===
- Berliner-Joyce XOJ-1, prototype of the Berliner-Joyce OJ
- May 1 – Grigorovich TB-5
- May 21 – Dewoitine D.30
- May 22 – Berliner-Joyce XFJ-2

=== June ===
- Curtiss XA-8, prototype of the Curtiss A-8 Shrike
- Curtiss YP-20 Hawk
- Curtiss XP-22 Hawk, prototype of the P-6E Hawk
- Focke-Wulf Fw 47

=== July ===
- Bernard H.V.40
- Macchi M.C.72
- July 24 – Dornier Do 10

=== August ===
- Bernard 81 GR Antoine Paillard
- August 7 – RWD-5

=== September ===
- Cierva C.24
- Heinkel He 59
- Lockheed-Detroit XP-900, prototype of the Lockheed-Detroit YP-24
- September 29 – Marinens Flyvebaatfabrikk M.F.11

=== October ===
- Avro 643 Cadet
- Dewoitine D.37
- October 2 – Junkers Ju 49
- October 3 – Latécoère 290
- October 21 – Bernard 74-02
- October 26 – De Havilland Tiger Moth DH.82 prototype G-ABRC
- October 31 – Westland Wallace

=== November ===
- November 25 – Couzinet 33 Biarritz
- November 27 – Fairey Seal
- November 27 – Fokker D.XVII

=== December ===
- December 12 – Amiot 110-S
- December 15 – Buhl A-1 Autogyro
- December 29
  - Grumman XFF-1, prototype of the Grumman FF
  - Hawker Audax

== Entered service ==
- Aeronca C-3
- Curtiss-Wright CW-14 Osprey
- Dewoitine D.27 with the Swiss Air Force
- Dornier Do Y with the Royal Yugoslav Air Force
- Fairchild 100
- Levasseur R3b with French Naval Aviation aboard the aircraft carrier Béarn
- Nakajima Ki-6 with Japan Air Transport
- Polikarpov I-5 with the Soviet Air Force

=== May ===
- May 1 – Ford RR-4, a version of the Ford Trimotor, with the United States Marine Corps (transferred from the United States Navy).

=== October ===
- October 27 – USS Akron (ZRS-4) with the United States Navy

=== November ===
- November 19 – Sikorsky S-40 with Pan American

=== December ===
- Nakajima E4N

== Retirements ==
- Airco DH.9A by the British Royal Air Force
- Avro 566 Avenger
- Avro 562 Avis
- Bristol F.2 Fighter by the British Royal Air Force
- Westland Witch
