= PA18 =

PA18 may refer to:

- Pennsylvania Route 18
- Pennsylvania's 18th congressional district
- Pitcairn PA-18, an autogyro produced in 1932
- Piper PA-18, a light aircraft first produced in 1949
