= PA19 =

PA19 may refer to:

- Pennsylvania Route 19 (1920s)
- Pennsylvania's 19th congressional district
- Pitcairn PA-19, an autogyro produced in 1932
- Piper PA-19, a light aircraft
- U.S. Route 19 in Pennsylvania
