= PA34 =

PA34 may refer to:

- Pennsylvania Route 34
- Pennsylvania's 34th congressional district
- Piper PA-34 Seneca, a light aircraft first produced in 1971
- Pitcairn PA-34, an autogyro of the 1930s
