= W5 =

W5, W-5 or W.5 may refer to:

== Arts, entertainment and media ==
- W5 (TV program), a Canadian television news program
- Nick News W/5, the original title of Nick News, an educational TV show

== Science and technology ==
- W5 (nuclear warhead) of the Mark 5 nuclear bomb
- W5 clock, built by Philip Woodward
- W5, a Motorola ROKR mobile phone
- W5, a radio source in the Westerhout 5 nebula
- W5, in the classification of meteorite weathering
- DSC-W5, a Sony Cyber-shot camera
- Eutelsat W5, a telecommunications satellite
- British NVC community W5, a type of woodland

== Transportation and military ==
- Albatros W.5, a World War I German floatplane torpedo bomber
- Cierva W.5, a British helicopter from 1938
- Wittman W-5 Buttercup, a 1938 aircraft
- London bus route W5
- Roewe W5, a Chinese car
- W5 series of road signs in the United States
- W5, a station of the Hiroden Hakushima Line in Hiroshima, Japan
- W5, IATA airline code for Mahan Air
- W5 tram, a class of electric trams built by the Melbourne & Metropolitan Tramways Board
- W5, station code for Hamilton E. Holmes station

== Other uses ==
- Five Ws: Who? What? When? Where? and Why?
- "Which Was What Was Wanted", an alternative to Q.E.D.
- W5 at the O2, part of The O2 Belfast, a sports and entertainment complex in Belfast, Northern Ireland
- W5, a postcode district in the W postcode area of London
- W.5, Asholt Wood, Kent, a Nature Conservation Review site
- World version W5, a kickboxing promotion

== See also ==
- 5W (disambiguation)
