= PA4 =

PA4 may refer to:

- ALCO PA-4, a diesel locomotive
- Paranormal Activity 4
- Pennsylvania Route 4
- Pennsylvania's 4th congressional district
- Pitcairn PA-4 Fleetwing II, a biplane
- PA4 paper; see Paper size
- The PA4, a type of rolling stock used on the PATH train in New York and New Jersey
