= PA24 =

PA24 may refer to:

- Pennsylvania Route 24
- Pennsylvania's 24th congressional district
- Pitcairn PA-24, an autogyro of the 1930s
- Piper PA-24 Comanche, a light aircraft first produced in 1957
