= Pitcairn PA-2 Sesquiwing =

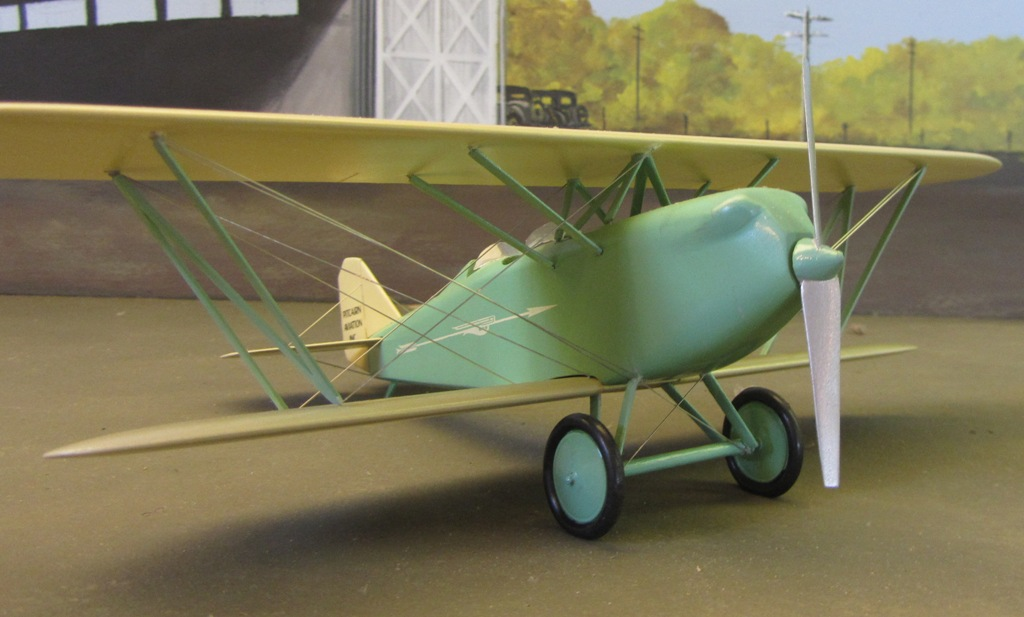
- Model of a 1926 PA-2 on display at the EAA Airventure Museum

General information
- Type: Biplane
- National origin: United States of America
- Manufacturer: Pitcairn Aircraft Company
- Designer: Agnew E. Larson

History
- Introduction date: 1926
- First flight: 1926

The Pitcairn PA-2 Sesquiwing "Arrow" is an early biplane designed for air racing and commercial airmail service.

== Design ==
The Sesquiwing featured a quick change motor mount to accommodate a Curtiss C-6 or Curtiss OX-5 engine, and wheel fairings for speed.

== Operational history ==
A specially built PA-2 was flown by Jim Ray in the 1926 Ford National Reliability Air Tour. It placed second in a race for engines under 800 cubic inches displacement, then it had its engine swapped to an OX-5 for a race the next day, and again back to a Curtiss C-6 engine the next day to win the Detroit race.

== Specifications (Pitcairn PA-2 Sesquiwing - C-6 engine) ==
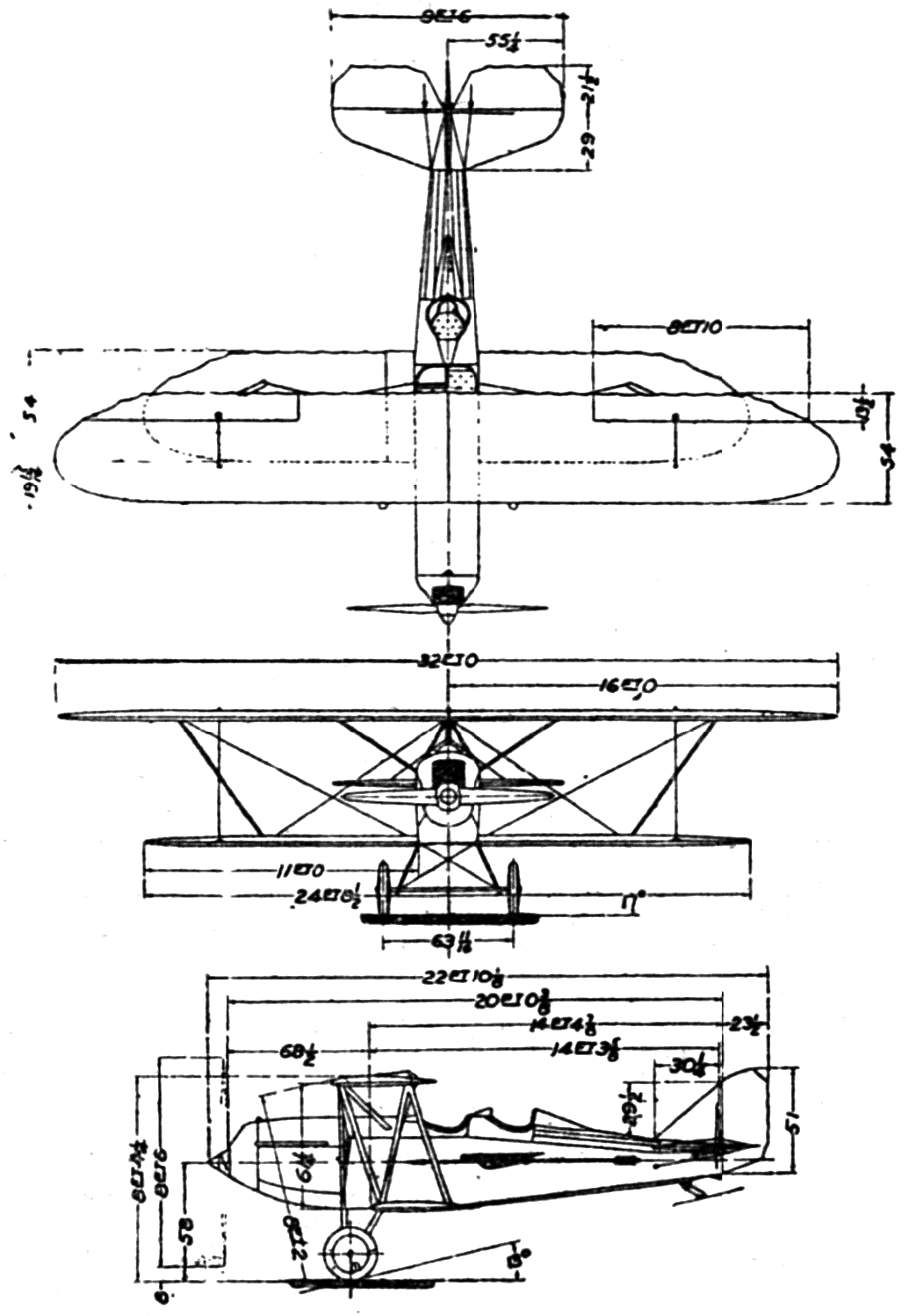
Pitcairn PA-2 Sesquiwing with OX-5 motor. 3-view drawing from Le Document aéronautique February,1927

Data from The Pitcairn Sesqui-Wing

General characteristics

- Crew: 1
- Capacity: 2 passengers
- Length: 22 ft 6 in (6.86 m)
- Upper wingspan: 32 ft 0 in (9.75 m)
- Lower wingspan: 24 ft 8 1/2 in (7.531 m)
- Height: 8 ft 4 in (2.54 m)
- Wing area: 219.8 sq ft (20.42 m^{2})
- Empty weight: 1,492 lb (677 kg)
- Gross weight: 2,246 lb (1,019 kg)
- Powerplant: 1 × Curtiss C-6 , 160 hp (120 kW)

Performance

- Maximum speed: 145 mph (233 km/h, 126 kn)
- Cruise speed: 120 mph (190 km/h, 100 kn)
- Stall speed: 60 mph (97 km/h, 52 kn)
- Range: 360 mi (580 km, 310 nmi)
- Endurance: 3 hr
- Service ceiling: 20,000 ft (6,100 m)
