= Curtiss C-6 =

Aircraft engine

C-6
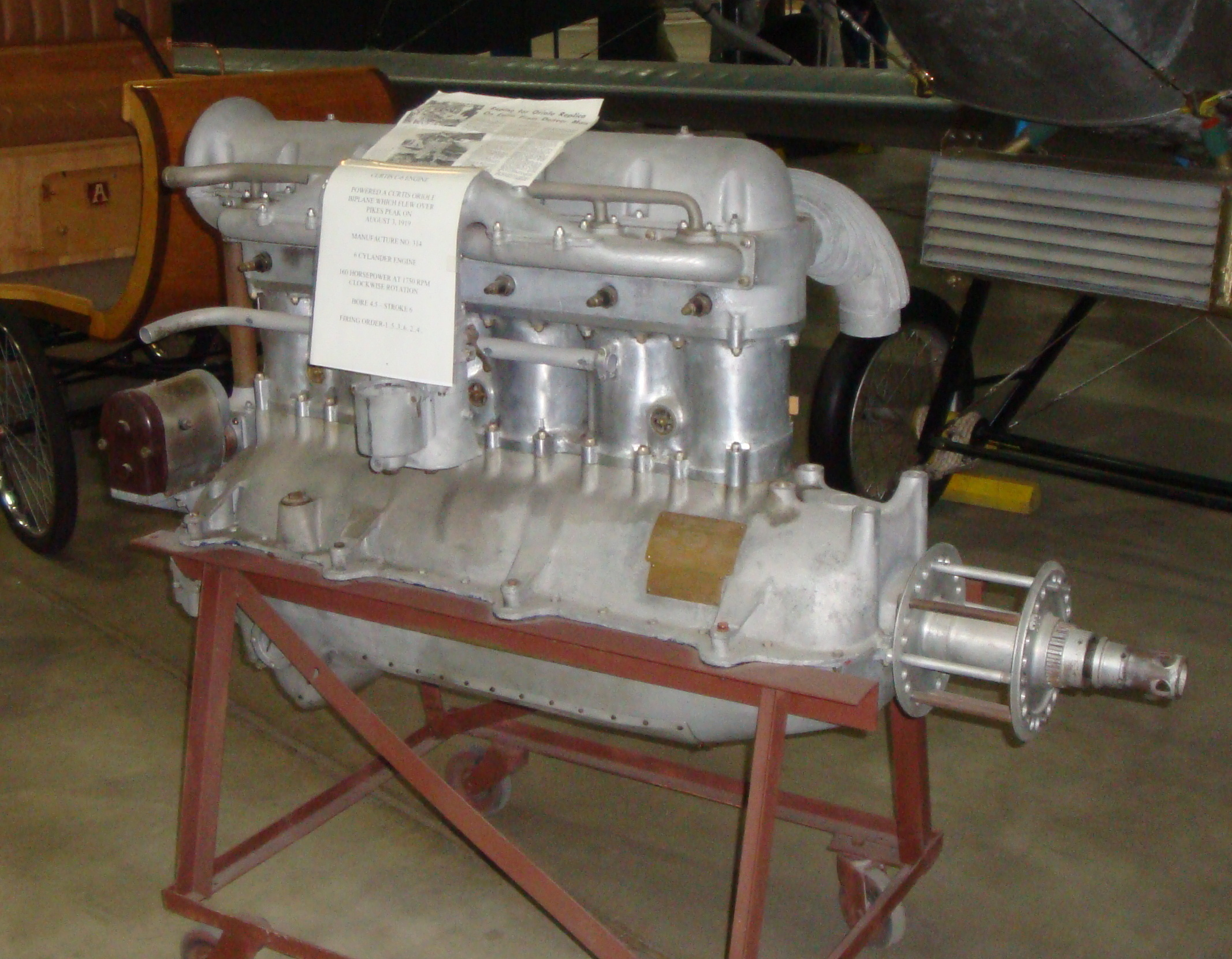
- C-6 engine on display at Wings Over the Rockies Air and Space Museum
- Type: Inline six cylinder aircraft engine.
- National origin: United States of America
- Manufacturer: Curtiss Aeroplane and Motor Company
- Developed from: Curtiss K6 / K12

The Curtiss C-6 is a six-cylinder, water-cooled, inline aircraft engine.

== Design and development ==
The C-6 features an overhead cam and aluminum cylinder jackets. Further development as a V-12 engine was carried out resulting in the C-12 and CD-12 engines.

== Variants ==
6-cylinder water-cooled in-line engine

== Applications ==
- Curtiss Lark
- Curtiss Oriole
- Curtiss MF Seagull
- Laird C-6 Special
- Pitcairn PA-1 Fleetwing
- Pitcairn PA-2 Sesquiwing
- Travel Air 2000
- Waco 9
- Marinens Flyvebaatfabrikk M.F.3

== Engines on display ==
- The Museum of Flight in Seattle, Washington has a Curtiss C-6A on display.
- The Canada Aviation and Space Museum has a Curtiss C-6A mounted on its Curtiss MF Seagull.

== Specifications (C-6) ==
=== General characteristics ===
- Type: 6-cylinder water-cooled inline
- Dry weight: 420 lb

=== Components ===
- Valvetrain: Two intake and two exhaust valves per cylinder, pushrod-actuated
- Cooling system: Water-cooled

=== Performance ===
- Power output:
- 160 hp at 1,250 rpm
- 161 hp at 1,760 rpm
- Fuel consumption: 0.5 lb/(hp h)
- Oil consumption: 0.016 lb/(hp h)
- Power-to-weight ratio: 0.38 hp/lb

== See also ==
Related lists

- List of aircraft engines
