= Pitcairn Aircraft Company =

American Aircraft Manufacturer

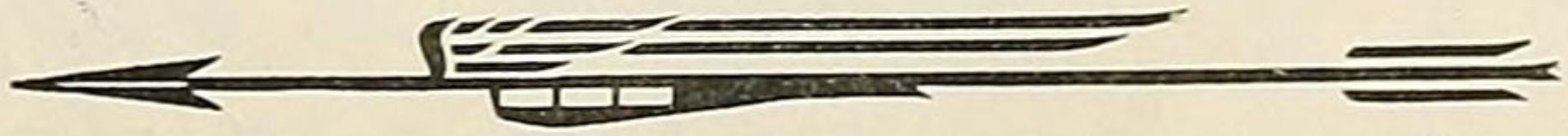
- Founded: 1926
- Defunct: 1948
- Successor: Pitcairn-Cierva Autogiro Company, Company of America (ACA, Pitcairn-Larsen Autogiro Company, AGA Aviation Corporation, G and A Aviation
- Headquarters: Willow Grove, Pennsylvania
- Key people: Harold Frederick Pitcairn
- Products: Commercial aircraft
- Subsidiaries: Pitcairn-Cierva Autogiro Company

a PA-5 Mailwing in the Air and Space Museum

The Pitcairn Aircraft Company was an American aircraft manufacturer of light utility aircraft. An early proponent of the autogyro, the company, later known as the Autogiro Company of America among other names, remained in business until 1948.

== History ==
Harold Frederick Pitcairn, the youngest son of PPG Industries founder John Pitcairn, Jr., founded Pitcairn Aircraft Company. The business started with the formation of Pitcairn Flying School and Passenger Service on 2 November 1924, which later became Eastern Airlines.

In 1926, Pitcairn started Pitcairn Aircraft Company initially to build aircraft for his growing airmail service. He purchased a field in Horsham Township, Montgomery County, Pennsylvania and built Pitcairn Field no. 2.

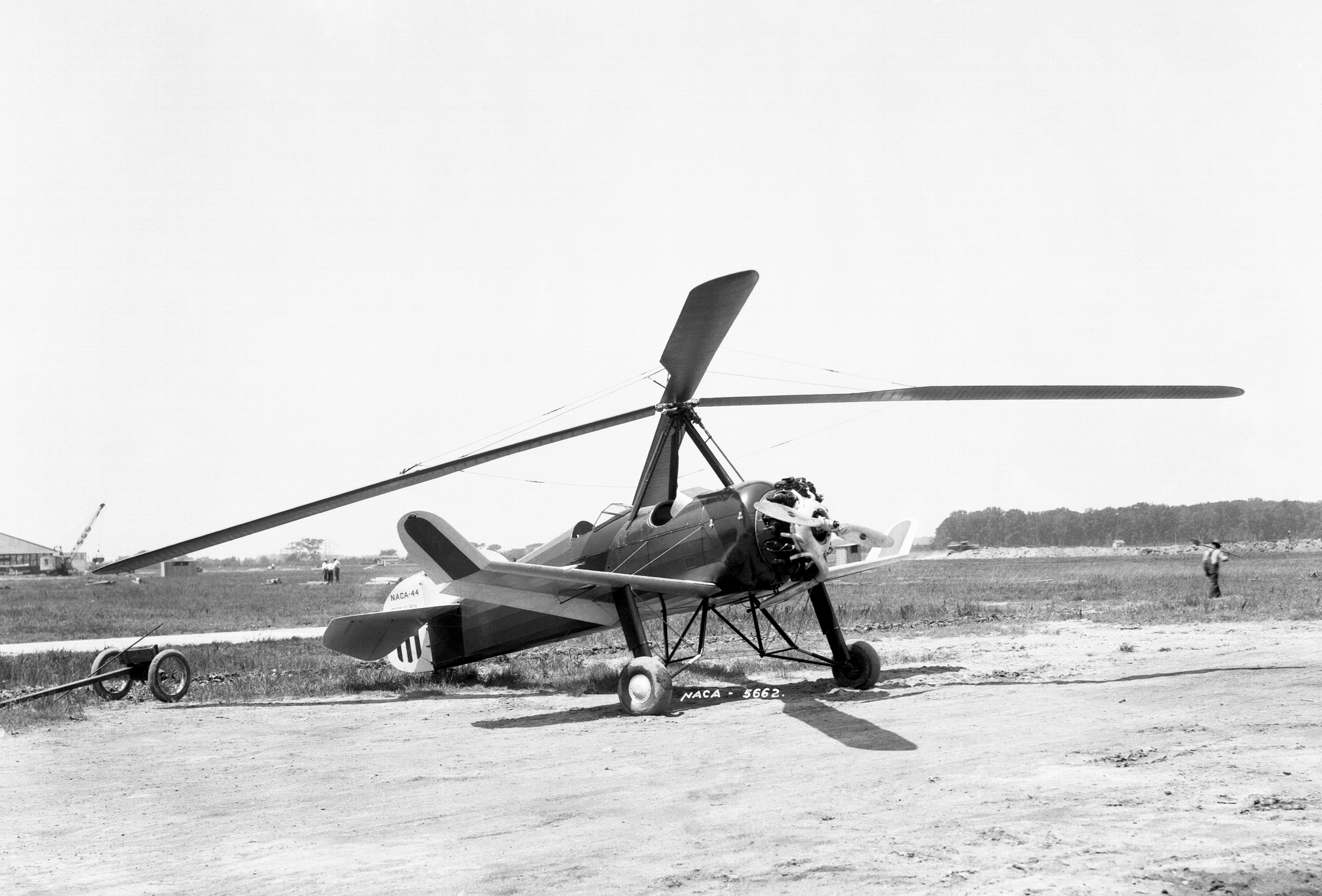
PCA-2

The first aircraft, a Pitcairn PA-1 Fleetwing, was built at the Bryn Athyn field. In 1927, Pitcairn brought aboard a friend and designer from his apprenticeship days at Curtiss Aeroplane and Motor Company, Agnew E. Larsen. Larsen left the Thomas-Morse Aircraft company to join Pitcairn. In June 1927, the state of the art Wright Whirlwind powered Pitcairn PA-5 Mailwing was introduced for airmail service. The plane proved popular and was bought by 13 other companies. In 1928, Pitcairn purchased a Cierva C.8W and the American manufacturing rights from Juan de la Cierva for his autogiro designs for $300,000. In 1929, Pitcairn formed a separate patent holding company to build autogiros, the Pitcairn-Cierva Autogiro Company, which was later renamed the Autogiro Company of America. Kellett autogyros competed with, and eventually licensed production rights from, Pitcairn-Cierva Autogiro Company for $300,000. As a part of the licensing agreement, Pitcairn used Cierva's copyrighted variant of the name Autogiro (capitalized and spelled with an i) as opposed to the currently more common spelling of autogyro which was initially used to bypass his copyright.

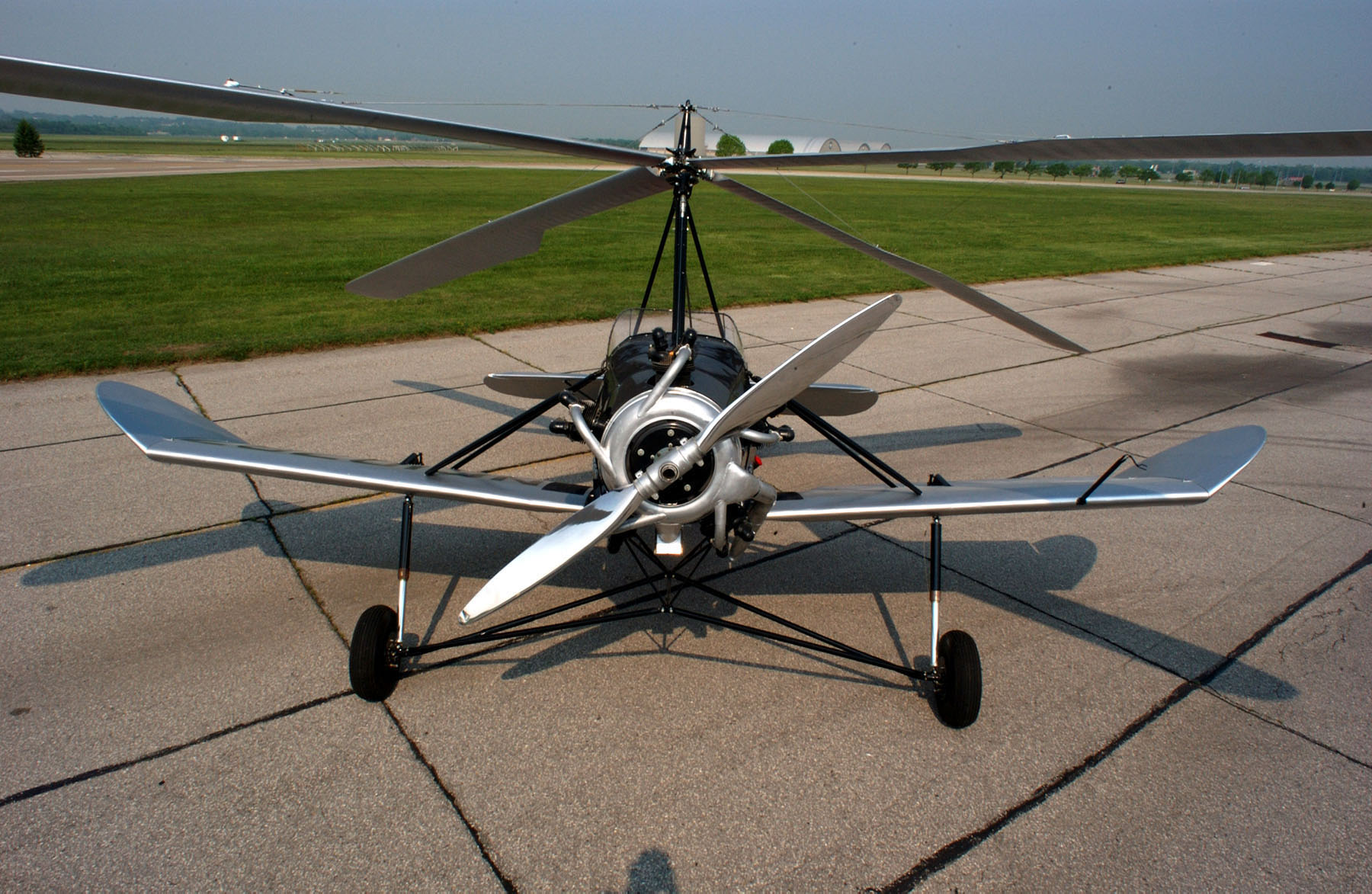
Licensed Kellett K-2

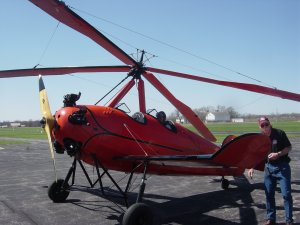
A restored PA-18

In 1929, three prototypes were built, and one was demonstrated in the 1929 Cleveland Air Races. Following a fire in November 1929, The first PCA-1 was built and tested the same month. In June 1929, Clement Keys personally bought all the shares of Pitcairn Aviation (the airline and flying school) for $2.5 million and resold them two weeks later to North American Aviation, which renamed the company Eastern Air Transport, and finally Eastern Airlines. From this point on, Pitcairn focused on autogiros.

In 1931, the company was renamed to the Autogiro Company of America (ACA). In 1931, The Detroit News made history when they bought the first Pitcairn PCA-2 for use as a news aircraft due to it ability to fly well at low altitude and speed, land and take off from restricted spaces, and semihover for better camera shots. This PCA-2 was the ancestor of today's news helicopters. Also in 1931, pilot James G. Ray landed an autogiro on the south lawn of the White House. Harold F. Pitcairn, the pilot, and three other company members of the Pitcairn-Cierva Autogiro Company were present to receive the Collier Trophy for their development of the autogyro.

In 1932, autogyro inventor Cierva was greeted by U.S. President Herbert Hoover, who predicted in the future we would have large transport autogyros. Amelia Earhart borrowed a company Pitcairn PCA-2 model. She arranged for the National Aeronautics Association to monitor the flight. Members of the New York press and Movietone News were invited to watch. On her second flight, she remained airborne for about three hours and set a woman's autogiro altitude record of 18,415 feet. Later, she toured the country for Beech-Nut Packing Company in a bright green autogiro. On the return trip, she crash landed in Abilene, Texas, earning her a reprimand from the United States Department of Commerce. A second crash at the Michigan state fair, caused an unintended injury of her husband's ankle as he ran to the scene.

In 1933, the parent company and conventional aircraft manufacturing arm, Pitcairn Aircraft Company, merged with the autogiro arm, following the end of Mailwing production, and contract air-mail flights.

On December 9, 1936, Juan de la Cierva died in a crash of a KLM DC-2. The Cierva Autogiro Company, Ltd., largely financed by the Scottish marine engineering firm of G & J Weir, Ltd., was then engaged in development of the "autodynamic" rotor, unworkable features of which were abandoned to produce the C.40 jump-takeoff autogiro for the British Air Ministry. Pitcairn's engineering staff used a different and more practical means of providing jump-takeoff performance, which was applied to the PA-36, PA-39, and XO-60 autogiros. The C.40 was the last autogiro produced by the British company, the activities of which were suspended with the outbreak of World War II.

Pitcairn was kept apprised of the activities of the Cierva Autogiro Company, which proposed the Gyrodyne to the Royal Navy in 1938 in response to a requirement for a ship-borne rotorcraft capable of hovering. Pitcairn's staff was similarly engaged in the design of such an aircraft, modifying the AC-35 Autogiro for the purpose. The G & J Weir Ltd. aircraft department was engaged in the development of the Weir W-5 helicopter, which was similar in configuration to that of the Focke-Achgelis Fa 61. Though holding a construction license for the Cierva C.19 and C.30 Autogiros, which did not include access to any theoretical information or patented technology, Focke-Wulf engaged in a systematic study of publicly available documents, as well as original research to develop the Fa 61. The British government attempted, both through its own offices and those of G & J Weir, Ltd., to license Fa 61 technology, but were presented with onerous terms, which were rejected. Though urged to abandon the autogiro and instead pursue helicopter development, Pitcairn considered the former aircraft to offer more utility to the private flyer and largely ignored the latter. This decision was to consign Pitcairn's rotary-wing activities to the sidelines as new companies appeared that took advantage of his pioneering work with the autogiro that was readily applied to helicopter development.

In 1938, the company was renamed to the Pitcairn-Larsen Autogiro Company, and again in 1940 to the AGA Aviation Corporation.

In 1942, Pitcairn's airfield and facilities at Willow Grove, Pennsylvania, were condemned by the US government for which he received $480,000, forming the Naval Air Station - Willow Grove. AGA Aviation was now renamed to G and A Aviation, and became part of Goodyear Tire and Rubber. Under threat by the US government of receiving no payment for his proprietary rotary-wing technology, Pitcairn reduced royalties for 19 in-house patents and 145 licensed patents to subcontractors of the government during wartime. After 1946, other manufacturers continued to produce helicopters under contracts with the US government which the latter assumed all indemnification for payment of royalties. The Pitcairn Autogiro Company was dissolved in 1948. Pitcairn continued to pursue litigation for use of the patents by other firms in 1951 that stretched into a 1977 Supreme Court case awarding Pitcairn's estate $32 million.

== Military operations ==
The US Navy evaluated a PCA-2 in 1931, designated as Pitcairn OP on the aircraft carrier USS Langley (CV-1), to become the first rotary-wing craft to land on a ship at sea. Piloted by then Lieutenant Melville Pride, the autogiro landed four times and taxied about the deck without the aid of a landing crew. On one of these take off and landings, Captain Kenneth Whiting was a passenger.

In 1940, six Pitcairn PA-18 autogyros were converted to Pitcairn PA-39 models for convoy escorts for the Royal Navy's Fleet Air Arm. Three of these aircraft were lost at sea whilst being delivered to the UK with the remaining three being received by the Fleet Air Arm but were not used operationally.

== Aircraft ==
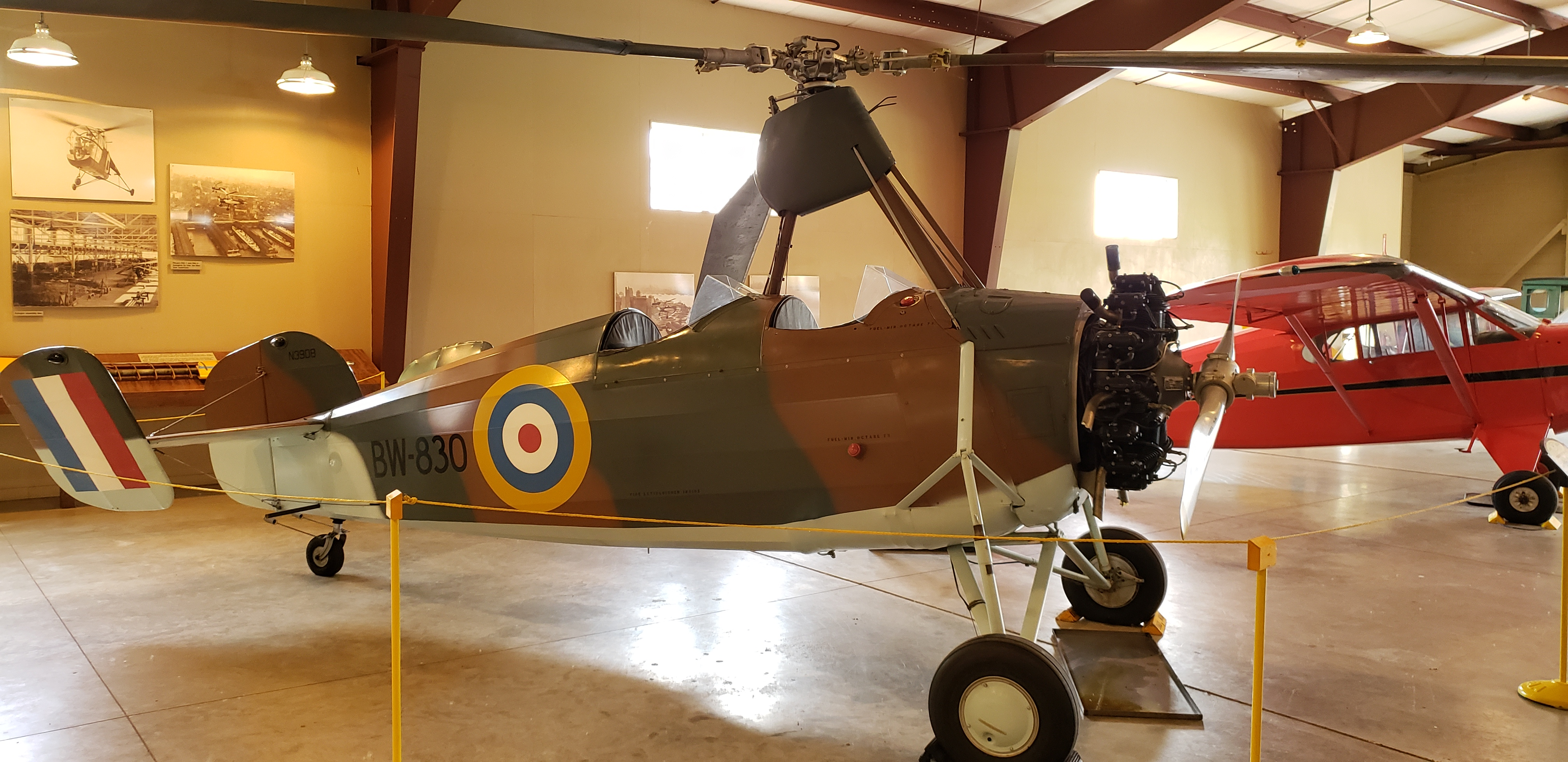
1941 Pitcairn PA-39 Autogiro N3908

Aircraft built by Pitcairn Aircraft Company
Model name	First flight	Number built	Type
Pitcairn PA-1 Fleetwing	1926	-	Five passenger commercial biplane
Pitcairn PA-2 Sesquiwing	1926	1	Commercial biplane
Pitcairn PA-3 Orowing	1926	35	Commercial biplane
Pitcairn PA-4 Fleetwing II	1927	10	Sport biplane
Pitcairn PA-5 Mailwing	1927	106	Commercial airmail biplane
Pitcairn PA-6 Super Mailwing	1928	-	PA-5 Mailwing modified with more cargo capacity
Pitcairn PA-7 Super Mailwing	1929	28	PA-6 Mailwing with three passenger capacity
Pitcairn PA-8 Super Mailwing	1930	6	PA-7 Mailwing with a Wright J-6 engine
Pitcairn PA-18	1932	51	Autogiro
Pitcairn PA-19	1933	1	R-975 powered autogiro with enclosed four place cabin
Pitcairn PA-20	1933		Kinner R-5 powered autogiro
Pitcairn PA-21	1932		R-975 powered autogiro
Pitcairn PA-22	1932	1	Two place wingless experimental autogiro
Pitcairn PA-24	1933	1	Twin tail version of PA-20 autogiro
Pitcairn PA-32	1932		Enclosed biplane
Pitcairn PA-33 - Pitcairn YG-2	1935	1	US army autogiro
Pitcairn PA-34 - Pitcairn XOP-1	1937	3	US Navy autogiro
Pitcairn PA-36	1939	1	Two place aluminum body autogiro
Pitcairn PA-38	1939	0	Military autogiro design
Pitcairn PA-39	1940	6	Two place jump takeoff autogiro for Royal Navy

Aircraft built by Pitcairn-Cierva Autogiro
Model name	First flight	Number built	Type
Pitcairn PCA-1	1930		Autogiro
Pitcairn PCA-2	1931	51	Autogiro
Pitcairn PCA-3	1931	1	Autogiro
Pitcairn PAA-1	1931	25	Two place sport autogiro
Pitcairn XOP-1	1932	3	Three place military autogiro

Aircraft built by Autogiro Company of America
Model name	First flight	Number built	Type
Autogiro Company of America AC-35	1936	1	Two place roadable autogiro

Aircraft built by Pitcairn/AGA
Model name	First flight	Number built	Type
Pitcairn XO-61	1943	1	Two place jump takeoff military autogiro
