= 5W =

5W or 5-W may refer to:

== Units of measurement ==
- 5°W, or 5th meridian west, a line of longitude
- 5 watts
- 5 weeks
- 5 wins, abbreviated in a win–loss record (pitching)

== Science, technology and transportation ==
- 5W, IATA code of Wizz Air Abu Dhabi
- 5w, a viscosity grade of motor oil
- I-5W, westbound Interstate 5
  - Interstate 5 in California
- AD-5W, a version of the Douglas A-1 Skyraider
- 5W, then IATA code for Astraeus Airlines which operated from 2002 until 2011

== Other uses ==
- Five Ws: Who?, What?, When?, Where?, and Why?
- "Which Was What Was Wanted", an alternative to Q.E.D.
- 5W Public Relations, a public relations agency
- 5W, production code for the 1982 Doctor Who serial Four to Doomsday

== See also ==
- W5 (disambiguation)
