= Pitcairn Mailwing =

American 1920s three-seat mail and utility biplane

Mailwing
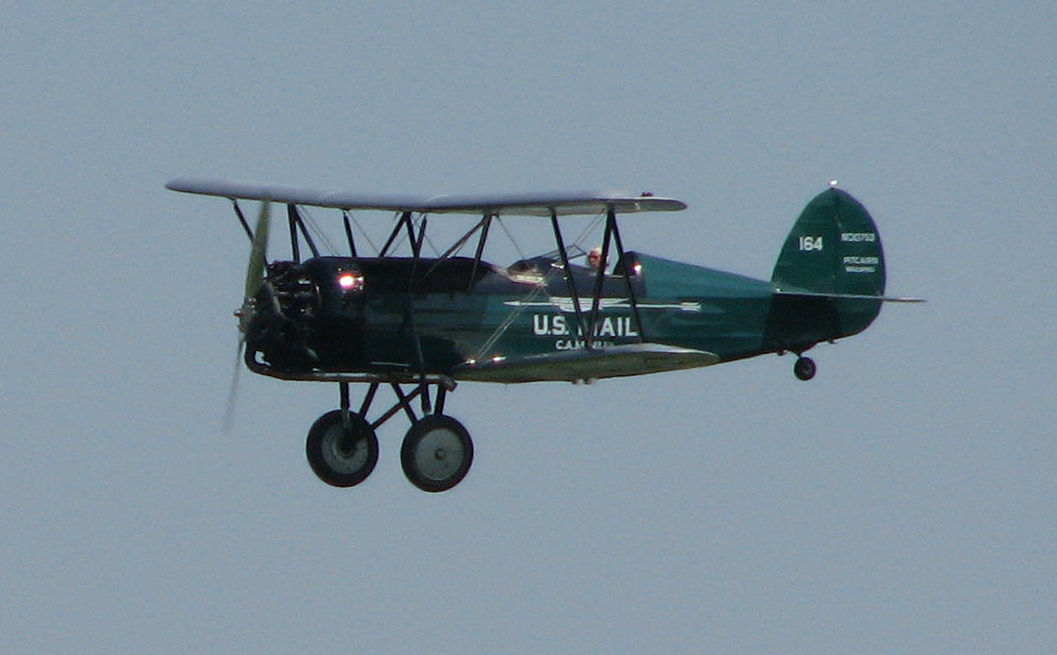
- PA-8 Mailwing in flight

General information
- Type: Mail carrier and sport
- National origin: United States
- Manufacturer: Pitcairn Aircraft Company
- Designer: Agnew E. Larsen
- Primary user: United States Post Office Department
- Number built: 106

History
- Introduction date: 1927
- First flight: 1927
- Developed from: Pitcairn PA-4 Fleetwing II

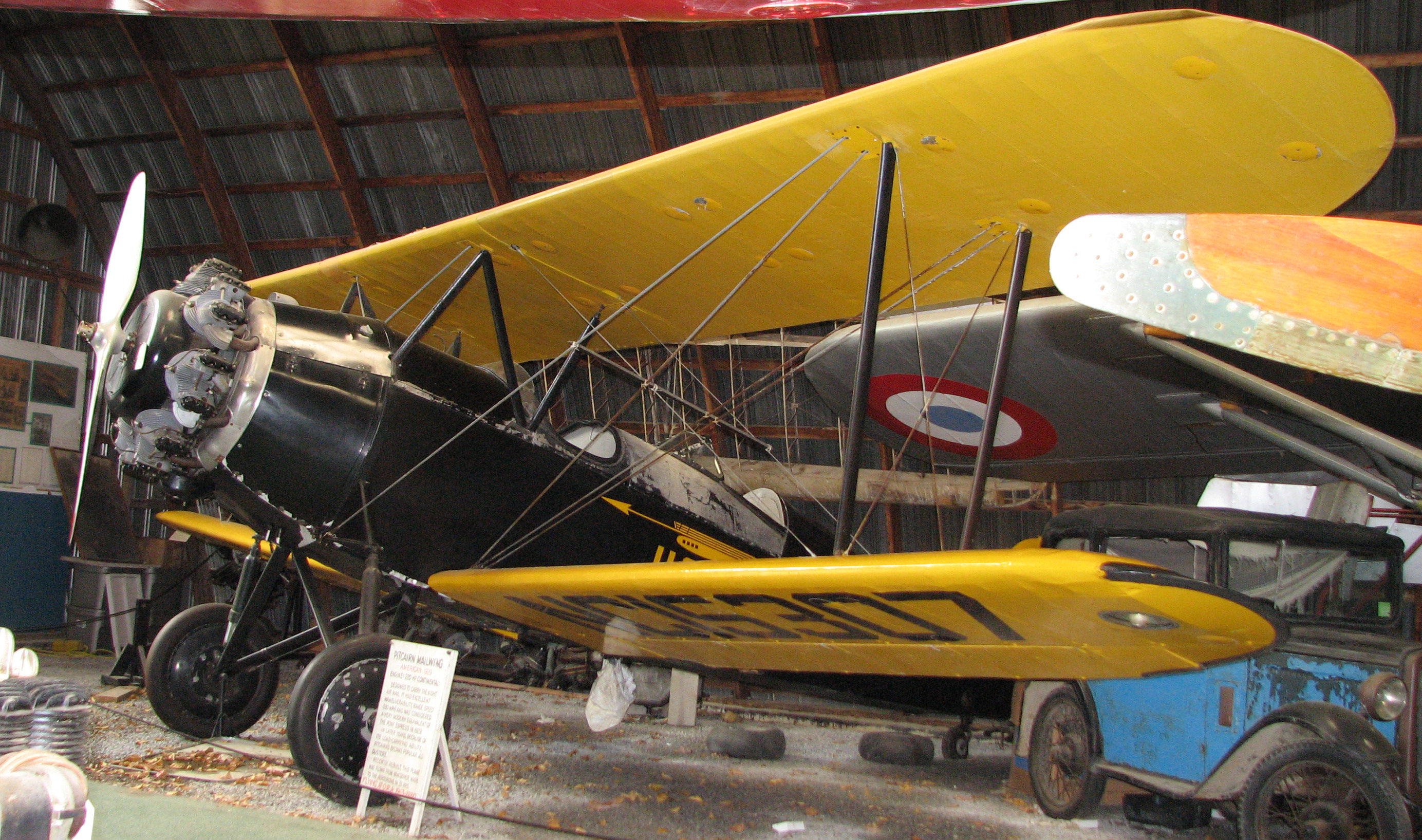
PA-6 Super Mailwing NC15307 at Old Rhinebeck Aerodrome

The Pitcairn Mailwing family is a series of American mail carrier and three-seat sport utility biplane aircraft produced from 1927 to 1931.

== Design and development ==
The Pitcairn Mailwings were developed to carry air mail for the United States Post Office Department. Of simple and robust construction, they had relatively benign flying characteristics.

They were constructed using chrome-moly steel tube and square-section spruce spars with spruce and plywood built-up ribs. The fuselage was faired using wooden formers and covered with fabric. The tail sections were built up from steel tube and fabric-covered. The Pitcairn Mailwing had a ground-adjustable fin and in-flight adjustable tailplane.

The undercarriage was of outrigger type with Oleo-Spring shock absorbers and disc brakes on the mainwheels. All versions looked very similar and changes were minor, with several fuselage extensions being the most obvious.

The mail was carried in a fireproof metal-lined compartment forward of the pilot's cockpit. The Mailwings were flown extensively by the U.S. Air Mail service from 1927 until the end of dedicated Air-Mail routes.

Pitcairn also built the same aircraft in sport versions for private use. These aircraft had the mail compartment removed, and a side-by-side two-seat cockpit was fitted.

== Variants ==
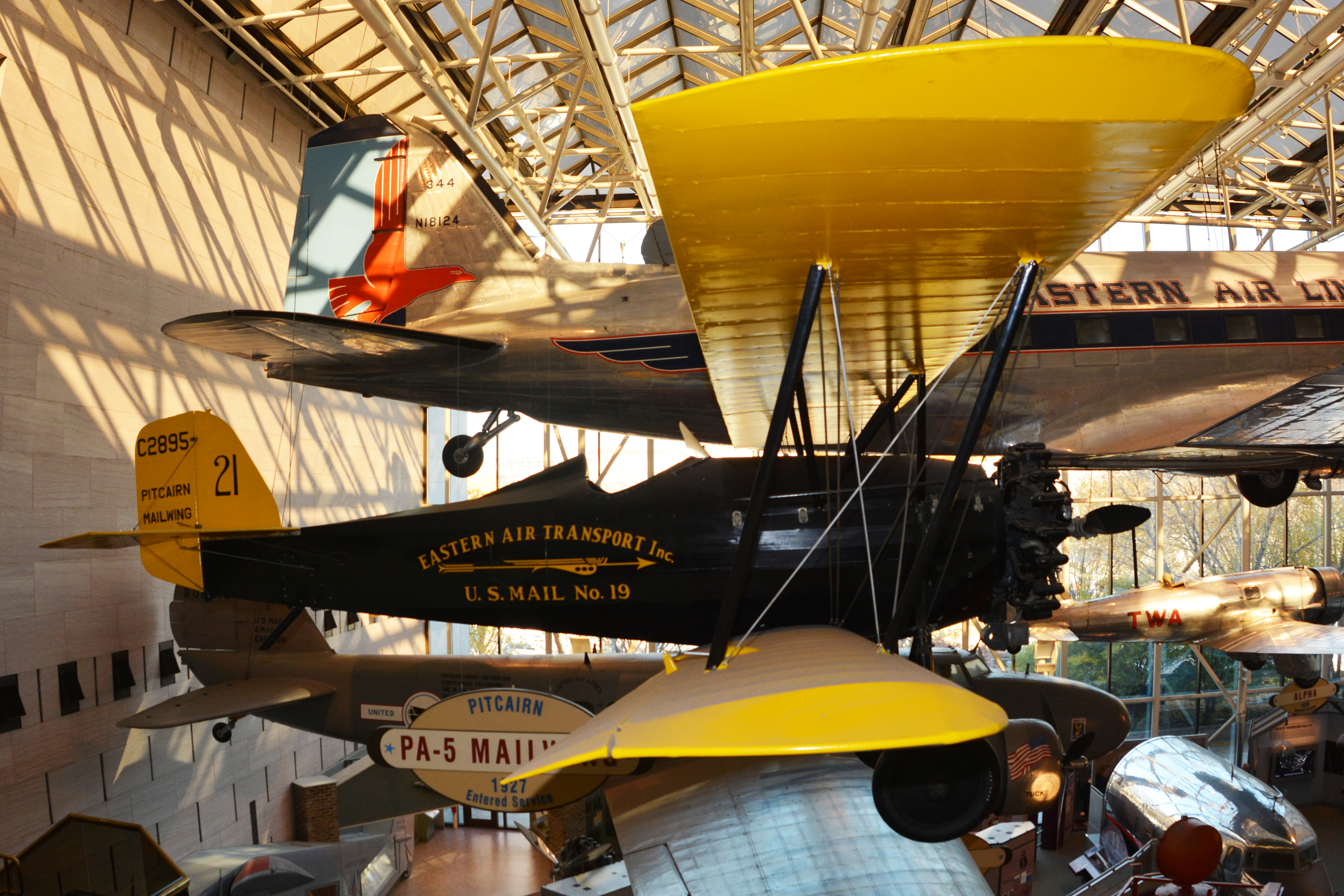
Pitcairn Mailwing PA-5, at the National Air and Space Museum

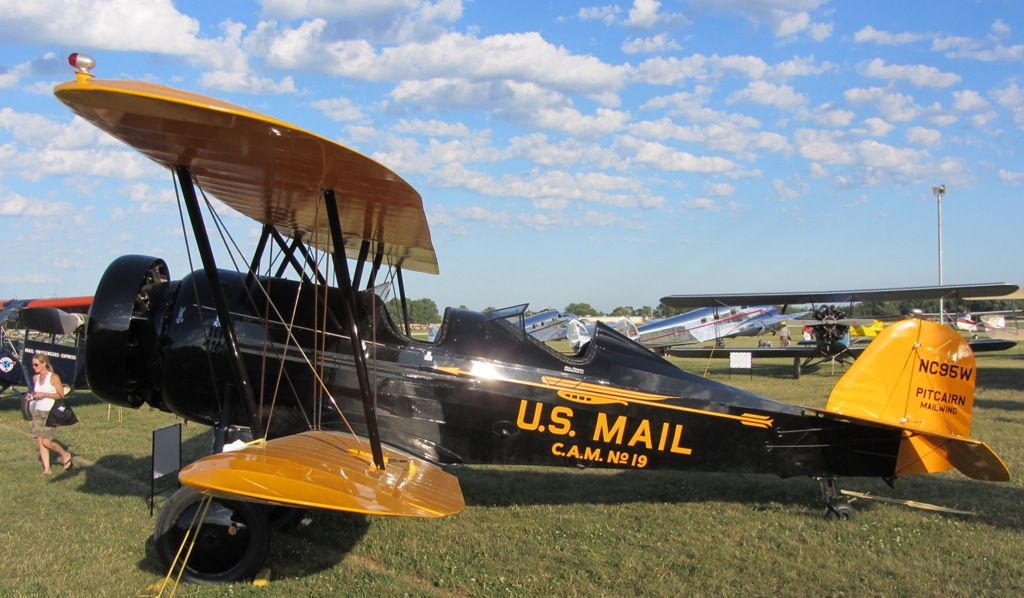
PA-7S Super Sport Mailwing

Data from: Aerofiles : Pitcairn

- PA-5 - original production version of 1927 with Wright J-5-9 engine; ATC 18 (32 built)
  - PA-5 Mailwing - mail carrier version
  - PA-5 Sport Mailwing - sport version with seats for two passengers
- PA-6 - 1928 production version with Wright J-5-9 engine; ATC 2-22 (early), 92 (late) (53 built)
  - PA-6 Super Mailwing - mail carrier version
    - PA-6B Super Mailwing - (1 converted from PA-6)
  - PA-6 Sport Mailwing - sport version with seats for two passengers
- PA-7 - 1929 production version with Wright J-6 engine; ATC 196
  - PA-7A Sport Mailwing
  - PA-7M Super Mailwing - mail carrier version (12 built)
  - PA-7S Super Sport Mailwing (15 built)
- PA-8 - 1930 production version with Wright J-6 engine; ATC 364
  - PA-8M Super Mailwing - mail carrier version (6 built)

== Operators ==
Canada

- Royal Canadian Air Force one PA-5 Mailwing for experimental use by Station Flight, CFB Borden

United States

- United States Post Office Department
- Howard Hughes owned a PA-5 Mailwing with a chrome plated engine.
- Felix du Pont owned a PA-5 with gold plated rocker covers.
- Steve McQueen owned a PA-8

== Survivors and aircraft on display ==
- PA-5 c/n 1 NC2895 on display at the National Air and Space Museum, Washington, DC
- PA-5 c/n 9 NC3835 currently on display at the Shannon Air Museum, Fredericksburg, VA
- PA-6 c/n 48 NC548K currently on display at the Eagles Mere Air Museum, Laporte, PA
- PA-7S c/n 147 NC95W on display at the EAA Aviation Museum, Oshkosh, WI
- PA-7S c/n 151 NC13158 currently owned and operated by the Owls Head Transportation Museum in Rockland, Maine
- PA-7S c/n ? NC97W just received Air Worthiness Certificate 7/2-26, owned by John Machamer privately owned in Gettysburg, PA
- PA-6 c/n 159 NC15307 on display at the Old Rhinebeck Aerodrome, Poughkeepsie, NY
- PA-8 c/n 164 NC10753
- PA-8 c/n 162 NC10751 on display at the Wings of Freedom Aviation Museum, Horsham, PA

== Specifications (PA-7M Super Mailwing) ==
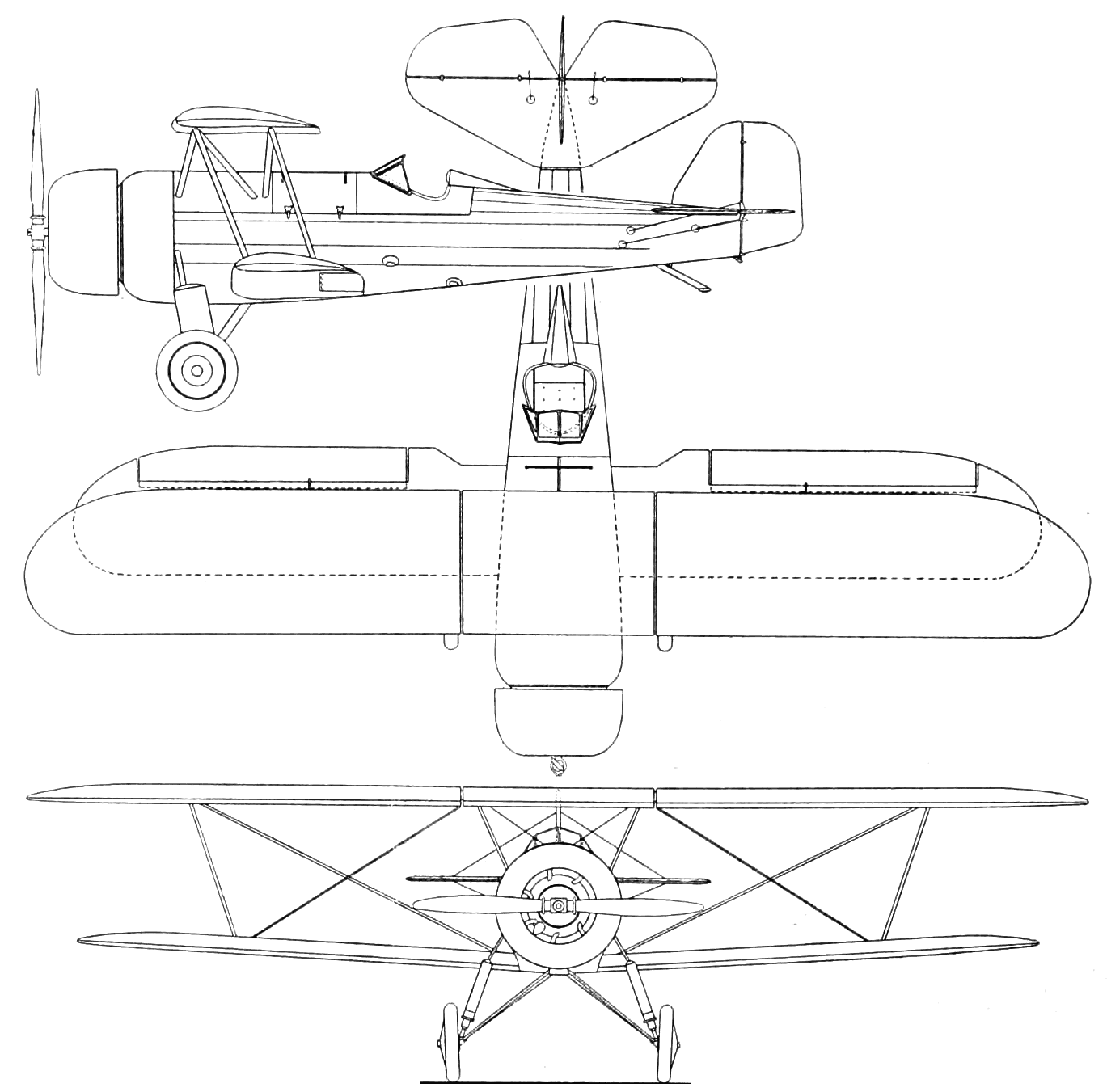
Pitcairn PA-7 Sport Mailwing 3-view from Aero Digest April, 1930

Data from Jane's all the World's Aircraft 1931, Aerofiles: Pitcairn

General characteristics

- Crew: 1
- Capacity: mail compartment 40 cu ft (1.1 m^{3}) / 550 lb (250 kg) payload
- Length: 23 ft 9 in (7.24 m)
- Upper wingspan: 33 ft (10 m)
- Lower wingspan: 30 ft (9.1 m)
- Height: 9 ft 6.5 in (2.908 m)
- Wing area: 243.5 sq ft (22.62 m^{2})
- Airfoil: Pitcairn No.1
- Empty weight: 1,820 lb (826 kg)
- Gross weight: 3,050 lb (1,383 kg)
- Fuel capacity: 60 US gal (50 imp gal; 230 L)
- Powerplant: 1 × Wright J-6 Whirlwind 9-cylinder air-cooled radial piston engine, 220 hp (160 kW)
- Propellers: 2-bladed Standard steel propeller

Performance

- Maximum speed: 150 mph (240 km/h, 130 kn)
- Landing speed: 57 mph (50 kn; 92 km/h)
- Cruise speed: 112 mph (180 km/h, 97 kn) (PA-5)
- Stall speed: 45 mph (72 km/h, 39 kn) (PA-5)
- Range: 520 mi (840 km, 450 nmi)
- Service ceiling: 18,000 ft (5,500 m) (PA-5)
- Rate of climb: 1,100 ft/min (5.6 m/s) (PA-5)
- Wing loading: 12.1 lb/sq ft (59 kg/m^{2})
- Power/mass: 13.8 lb/hp (8.4 kg/kW)

== See also ==
=== Aircraft of comparable role, configuration and era ===
(Partial listing, only covers most numerous types)

- Alexander Eaglerock
- American Eagle A-101
- Brunner-Winkle Bird
- Buhl-Verville CA-3 Airster
- Command-Aire 3C3
- Parks P-1
- Spartan C3
- Stearman C2 and C3
- Swallow New Swallow
- Travel Air 2000 and 4000
- Waco 10

=== Related lists ===
- List of aircraft
- List of civil aircraft
