= Pitcairn PA-4 Fleetwing II =

PA-4 Fleetwing II
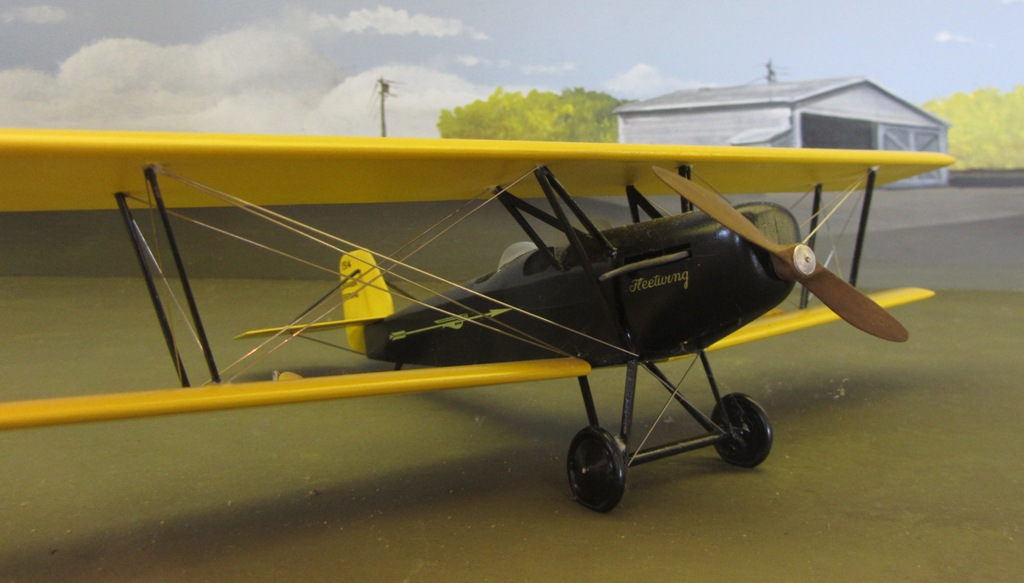
- A PA-4 Fleetwing II model on display at the EAA Airventure Museum

General information
- Type: Biplane
- National origin: United States
- Manufacturer: Pitcairn Aircraft Company
- Designer: Agnew E. Larson
- Number built: 10

History
- Manufactured: 1927-1928
- Introduction date: 1927
- First flight: 1927

The Pitcairn PA-4 Fleetwing II, also called the Pitcairn Fleetwing DeLuxe, and the Pitcairn PA-4 Fleetwing is a commercial mail hauling and passenger biplane.

== Design and development ==
Ten PA-4s were built before it was re-engined with the Wright J-5 Whirlwind as the Pitcairn PA-5 to fly on the CAM-19 mail routes.

The Fleetwing II is a conventional landing gear equipped biplane with strut-braced tail surfaces. The fuselage is welded steel-tube construction with aircraft fabric covering. The cowling is formed from two pieces. The wire wheels were streamlined with laced-on discs.

== Operational history ==
Six Fleetwings were sold directly to Pitcairn Aviation. In 1928, the Fleetwing II The City of Reading participated in the Transcontinental Air Race. It was sold to Reading Airways after the race and later used in stunt flying around Cumberland, Maryland with the signature "Flying through a train tunnel" illusion.

The sole remaining Fleetwing II was rebuilt over the course of seven years by Harold Armstrong from drawings supplied by Steve Pitcairn (1925–2008), son of company founder Harold Frederick Pitcairn (1897–1960). The aircraft won Grand Champion Antique at the 1991 EAA AirVenture Oshkosh airshow. Armstrong's Fleetwing was seriously damaged in an accident on September 9, 2012.

== Specifications (Fleetwing II) ==
Data from Vintage Airplane

General characteristics

- Crew: 1
- Capacity: 2
- Length: 22 ft 1.75 in (6.7501 m)
- Upper wingspan: 33 ft (10 m)
- Lower wingspan: 30 ft (9.1 m)
- Height: 8 ft 11 in (2.72 m)
- Powerplant: 1 × Curtiss OX-5 piston aircraft engine, 90 hp (67 kW)
- Propellers: 2-bladed Hartzell

Performance

- Cruise speed: 70 kn (80 mph, 130 km/h)
