= Pitcairn OP-1 =

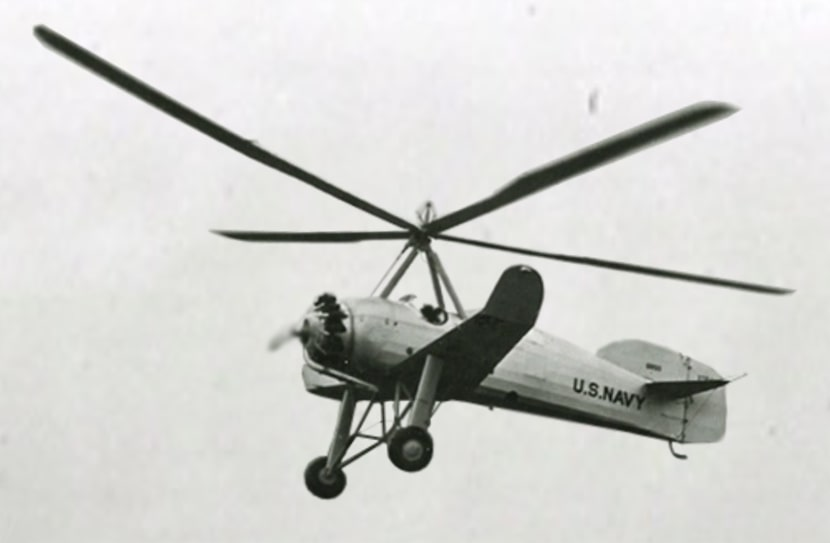
- An XOP-1 under evaluation by the U.S. Navy

General information
- Type: Reconnaissance autogyro
- Manufacturer: Pitcairn-Cierva Autogiro Company
- Status: Retired
- Primary user: United States
- Number built: 2

History
- Introduction date: 1932
- Developed from: Pitcairn PCA-2

The Pitcairn OP-1 (manufacturer designation: PCA-2) was the first rotary-wing aircraft to be seriously evaluated by any of the world's major air forces. The aircraft was a relatively new type, an autogyro. Pitcairn's model was never put into production for any military.

== Development ==
The Pitcairn-Cierva Autogiro Company, established by Harold Frederick Pitcairn, designed the PCA-2 based on the autogiros of Juan de la Cierva. The resulting design had a standard aircraft fuselage and powerplant, with a standard tail. However, it sported short, stubby wings, angled up at the wingtips. Above the cockpit was the rotor, consisting of three blades. The engine usually drove a standard propeller, on a vertical plane, in front of the aircraft. However, the engine could be geared to the horizontal rotor during takeoff or landing. The horizontal rotor, while in flight, did not draw energy from the engine but rather generated lift from airspeed. A minimum speed of 30 mph was needed to keep the aircraft in flight. Thus, in moderate winds, the aircraft could behave like a helicopter, except that it could not hover.

The Pitcairn autogyro was first evaluated by the US military in the 1930s. In 1931, the Navy tested two prototypes, labelled XOP-1. One was tested with the aircraft carrier USS Langley, on September 23, 1931. The only Pitcairn to see operational service did so in Nicaragua with the US Marines, starting in June 1932. This stint led to the Pitcairn OP-1 being rejected.

== Pitcairn OP-2 ==
In 1935 the USN acquired a Pitcairn PA-34 autogyro, designated OP-2. The PA-34 was not a PCA-2 with wings removed but a separate design incorporating a three-bladed rotor with no wings, closely related to the US Army's YG-2 / PA-33.

== Operational service ==
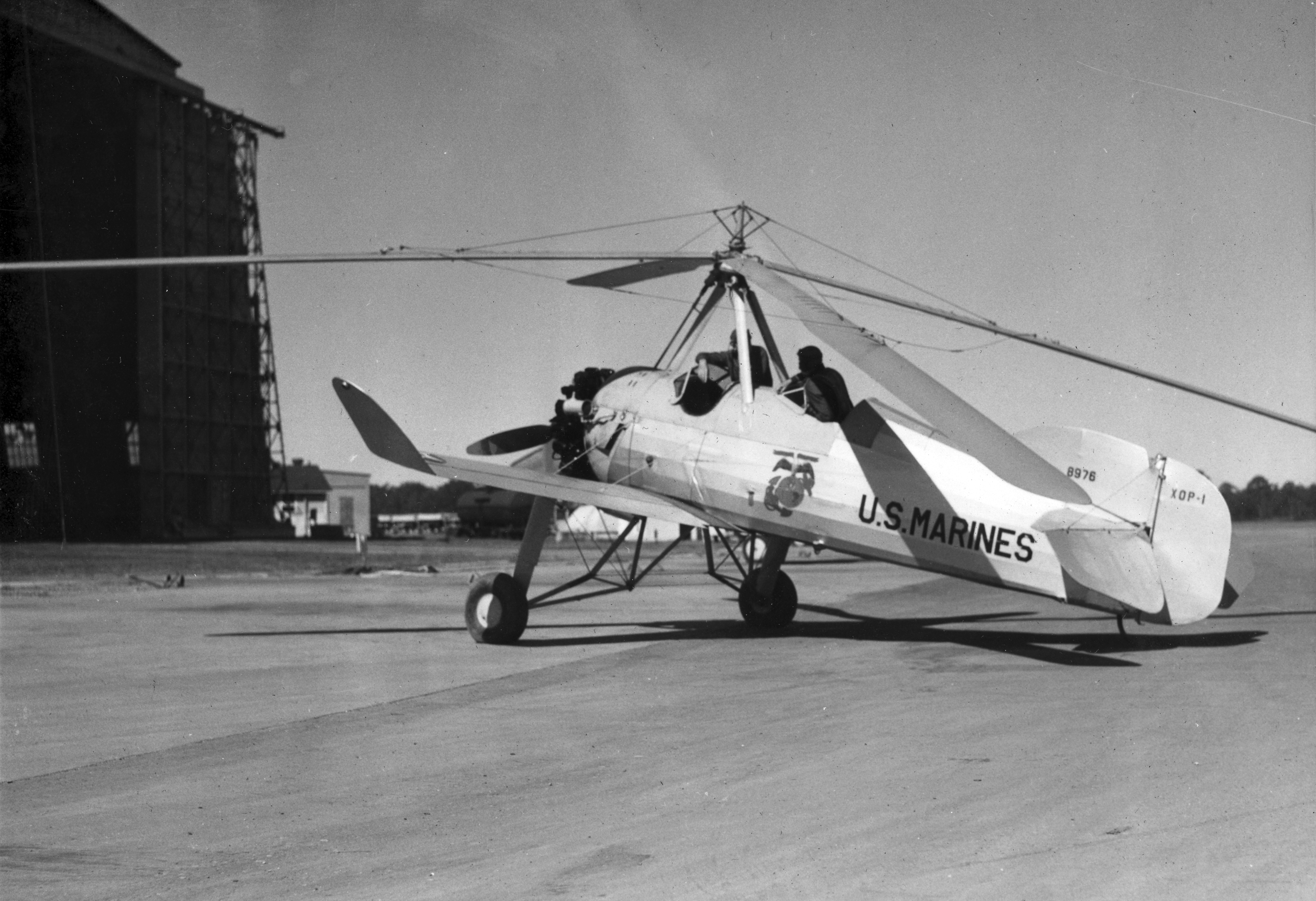
A U.S. Marine Corps Pitcairn OP.

Only the Pitcairn OP-1 saw operational service. One autogyro, assigned to Marine Utility Squadron Six (VJ-6M), was sent to Nicaragua in June 1932. The autogyro would be tested through policing the rebel-infested mountains and jungles. While the aircraft performed well, its range significantly impaired it. In addition, after the crew only 50 pounds could be carried. Marine historian Robert Debs Heinl, Jr. recounted the autogyro as being an "exasperating contraption".

== Operators ==
United States

- United States Marine Corps
  - Marine Observation Squadron 6

== Specifications (OP-1) ==
Data from Aerofiles

General characteristics

- Crew: 2
- Length: 23 ft 1 in (7.04 m) (fuselage)
- Wingspan: 29 ft 10 in (9.1 m) (wings)
- Airfoil: NACA M-3 modified
- Empty weight: 2,025 lb (919 kg)
- Gross weight: 3,057 lb (1,387 kg)
- Powerplant: 1 × Wright R-975 9-cylinder air-cooled radial piston engine, 300 hp (220 kW)
- Main rotor diameter: 45 ft (14 m)
- Propellers: 2-bladed fixed pitch wooden propeller

Performance

- Maximum speed: 115 mph (185 km/h, 100 kn)
- Cruise speed: 98 mph (158 km/h, 85 kn)
- Range: 290 mi (470 km, 250 nmi)
