= Pitcairn PA-34 =

Pitcairn PA-33 / PA-34
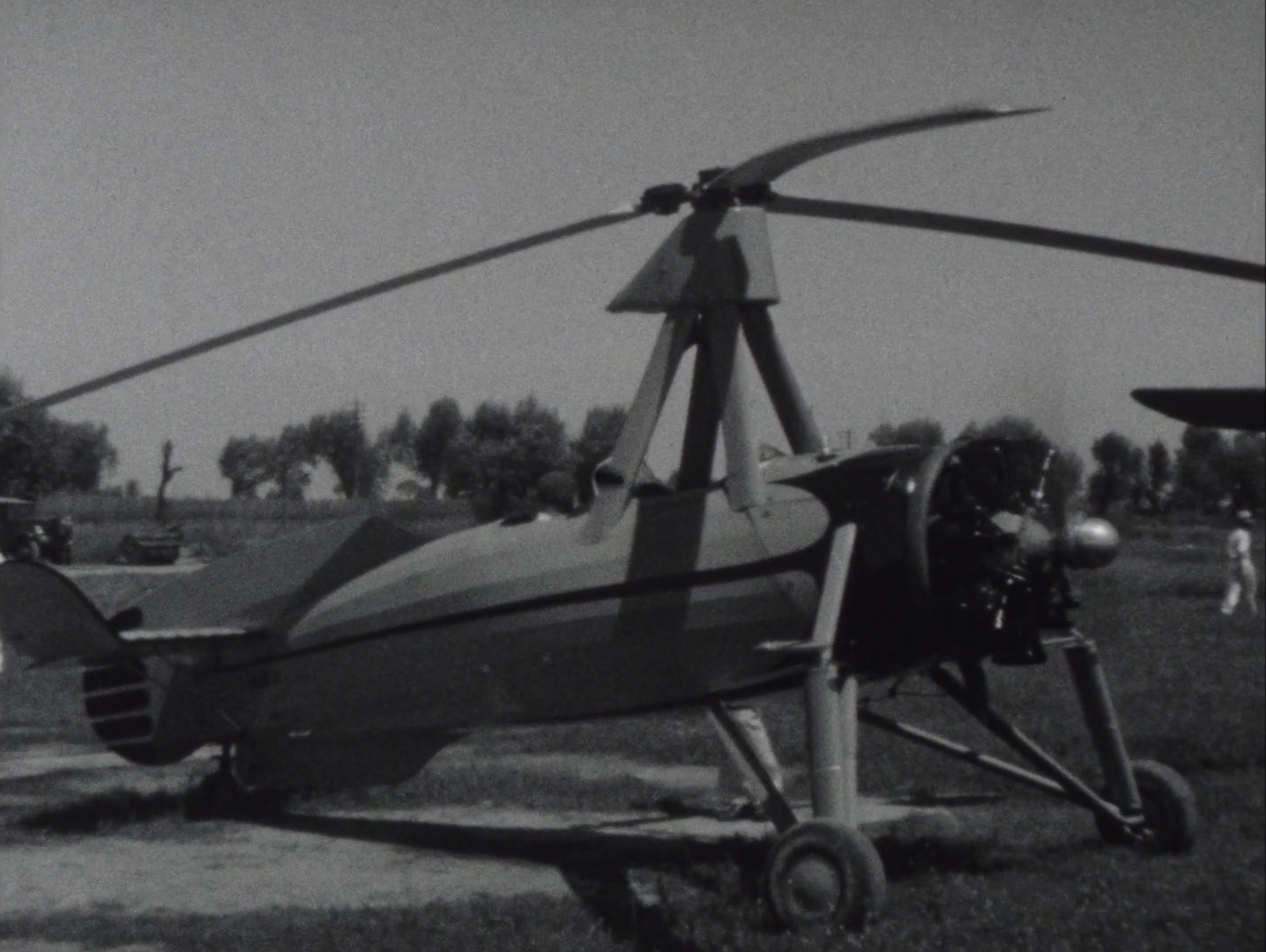
- A still of a Pitcairn PA-34 Autogiro from a film clip of the aircraft flying circa 1930s.

General information
- Type: reconnaissance autogyro
- National origin: United States
- Manufacturer: Pitcairn
- Number built: 1 x PA-34, 1x PA-33

History
- First flight: 1936

The Pitcairn PA-34 and Pitcairn PA-33, given the United States Navy (USN) designation Pitcairn OP-2 and United States Army (US Army) designation Pitcairn YG-2 respectively were reconnaissance autogyros designed and built in 1936 for evaluation.

== Design and development ==
The Pitcairn Aircraft Company built and developed auto-gyros under licence from the Cierva Autogiro Company, trading as the Pitcairn-Cierva Autogiro Company from the late 1920s. Interest in the auto-gyro by the USN resulted in the purchase of two Pitcairn PCA-2 autogyros, modified as two-seat observation platforms, designated XOP-1. Trials with the XOP-1s from 1931 had limited success, but included an operational deployment in Nicaragua from June 1932, with the United States Marine Corps (USMC).

Following the development of much-improved rotor and control systems, further interest by US armed forces resulted in the Pitcairn PA-33 (YG-2) and Pitcairn PA-34 (XOP-2). These essentially identical aircraft differed mainly in undercarriage design; the PA-33 had fully cantilevered oleo-pneumatic undercarriage legs and the PA-34 had strut mounted split axles with oleo-pneumatic shock-absorbers attached to the top fuselage longerons.

The fuselage was constructed of welded steel tube with fabric covering and light alloy fairings. The 3-bladed folding rotor was mounted on a braced bi-pod with legs fore and aft of the front cockpit. The tail unit consisted of a very wide chord fin and rudder with a strut supported tail-plane sporting up-turned wing-tips. Tail surfaces were constructed of wood with fabric covering and rotor blades were built with steel tube spars and plywood ribs with fabric covering.

Accommodation was in tandem cockpits with the pilot in the rear cockpit aft of the rotor support bi-pod and the observer in the front cockpit beneath the rotor head.

Power was supplied by a nose-mounted 420 hp (310 kW) Wright R-975E-2 in a tight-fitting wide chord cowling with blisters to accommodate rocker arms. The engine was mounted with considerable nose-down angle to ensure prop-wash over the rotor to maintain rotation and ease rotor starting.

Control of the aircraft was achieved only by use of the throttle and the tilting rotor-head, operated by a hanging control stick in the rear cockpit.

== Operational history ==
The YG-2 and OP-2 were briefly tested by the US Army and US Navy, with limited success. After completing tests with the US Army, the YG-2 was taken over by the National Advisory Committee for Aeronautics (NACA). registered as NACA 88. On 30 March 1936, whilst on test, NACA 88 suffered a rotor failure, prompting the crew to perform the first successful bail-out from a rotary-winged aircraft.

== Variants ==
PA-33
Company designation of the YG-2 for the US Army
PA-34
Company designation of the OP-2 for the US Navy
YG-2
US Army trials autogyro (PA-33), 1 built.
XOP-2
US Navy trials autogyro (PA-34), one built.

== Specifications (PA-33 / PA-34) ==
Data from Jane's all the World's Aircraft 1938

General characteristics

- Crew: 2
- Length: 43 ft 5 in (13.23 m) blades folded
- Width: 15 ft 0.1 in (4.575 m) blades folded
- Height: 11 ft 7 in (3.52 m)
- Empty weight: 2,300 lb (1,043 kg)
- Gross weight: 3,300 lb (1,497 kg)
- Fuel capacity: fuel 66 US gal (55 imp gal; 250 L); oil 6.5 US gal (5.4 imp gal; 25 L)
- Powerplant: 1 × Wright R-975E-2 9 cylinder air-cooled radial piston engine, 420 hp (310 kW)
- Main rotor diameter: 50 ft (15 m)
- Propellers: 2-bladed variable pitch metal propeller

Performance

- Maximum speed: 140 mph (230 km/h, 120 kn) at sea level, 128 mph (111 kn; 206 km/h) at 8,900 ft (2,700 m)
- Cruise speed: 115 mph (185 km/h, 100 kn) at sea level
- Minimum control speed: 22 mph (35 km/h, 19 kn)
- Endurance: 3.26 hours at cruising speed
- Service ceiling: 15,500 ft (4,700 m)
- Time to altitude: 5,000 ft (1,500 m) in 3.8 mins
- Take-off distance: 135 ft (41 m) in dead calm: 0 ft (0 m) in 28 mph (24 kn; 45 km/h) wind
- Landing run: 0 ft (0 m)
