= Pitcairn PA-18 =

PA-18
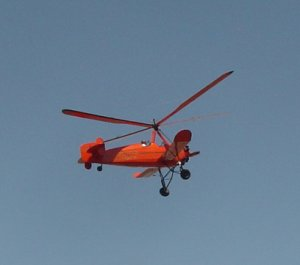
- Pitcairn PA-18 in flight at Andy Barnhart Memorial Airport, New Carlisle OH, April 17, 2009.

General information
- Type: Sport autogyro
- National origin: United States
- Manufacturer: Pitcairn Aircraft Company
- Number built: ca 20

History
- First flight: 1932

The Pitcairn PA-18 was an autogyro produced in the United States in the early 1930s.

== History ==
In 1931, Pitcairn had produced a lightweight autogyro suitable for the private pilots as the PAA-1. Experience with this and with other light, low-powered machines convinced Pitcairn that while the concept was good, they presented significant handling problems to inexperienced pilots. The PA-18 was designed as a machine for the same market, but with a more powerful engine and structural strengthening. The availability of more power contributed greatly to the aircraft's responsiveness at low speeds.

According to Frank Kingston Smith Sr. wrote, "Pitcairn's assessment of the market had been correct: within a year and a half more than nineteen PA-18s were produced and sold, vindicating his decision to proceed with the basic machine while experimenting with the direct-control system."

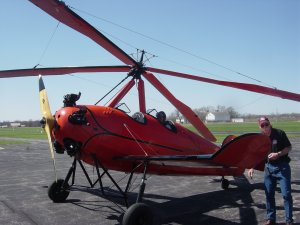
Pitcairn PA-18 after successful flight at Andy Barnhart Memorial Airport, New Carlisle, OH, April 17, 2009.

In 2008, a PA-18 was restored to flying condition by Jack and Kate Tiffany of New Carlisle, Ohio. At the same time, a second PA-18 was under restoration by the Posey Brothers firm at the Trenton-Robbinsville Airport. Most other PA-18s were purchased by the United States government in 1940 and sold on to the United Kingdom. They never arrived, however, since the ship carrying them was sunk by a German submarine.

== Specifications (PA-18) ==
Data from "Pitcairn, A G A, Pitcairn-Cierva, Pitcairn-Larsen"

General characteristics

- Crew: One pilot
- Capacity: 1 passenger
- Length: 19 ft 5 in (5.92 m)
- Wingspan: 21 ft 3 in (6.48 m)
- Powerplant: 1 × Kinner R-5 , 160 hp (120 kW)
- Main rotor diameter: 40 ft 0 in (12.19 m)
- Main rotor area: 1,260 sq ft (117 m^{2})

Performance

- Maximum speed: 95 mph (150 km/h, 83 kn)
- Range: 225 mi (362 km, 196 nmi)
- Service ceiling: 12,000 ft (3,658 m)

== See also ==
Aircraft of comparable role, configuration, and era

- Buhl A-1 Autogyro
- Cierva C.19
- Pitcairn PCA-2
