= Pitcairn PA-1 Fleetwing =

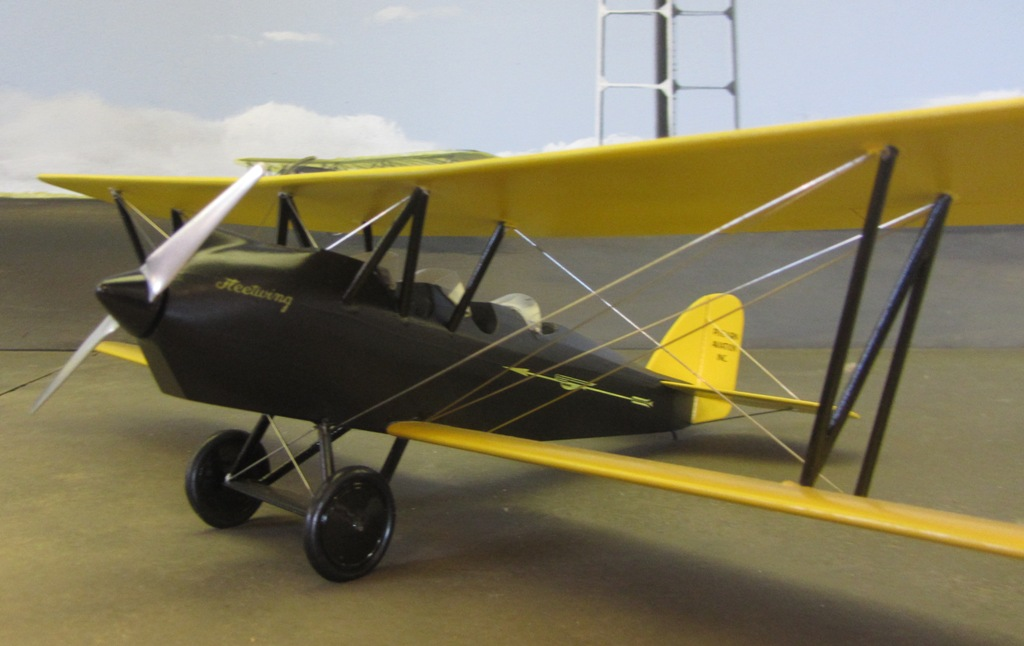
- Pitcairn PA-1 Fleetwing model on display at the EAA Airventure Museum.

General information
- Type: Biplane
- National origin: United States of America
- Manufacturer: Pitcairn Aircraft Company
- Designer: Agnew E. Larson

History
- Introduction date: 1925
- First flight: 1925

The Pitcairn PA-1 Fleetwing (Pitcairn Aviation - One) is the first biplane designed for air racing and commercial airmail service by Pitcairn Aircraft Company.

== Design ==
The Fleetwing biplane featured three cockpits capable carrying four revenue sightseeing passengers. The fuselage used (square and round) steel tubing with fabric covering. The squarish fuselage featured a slanted radiator on the front of the lower cowling

== Operational history ==
The prototype PA-1 crashed after a flight with the control cables rigged backwards. A second aircraft was built shortly afterward.

== Specifications (Pitcairn PA-1 Fleetwing) ==
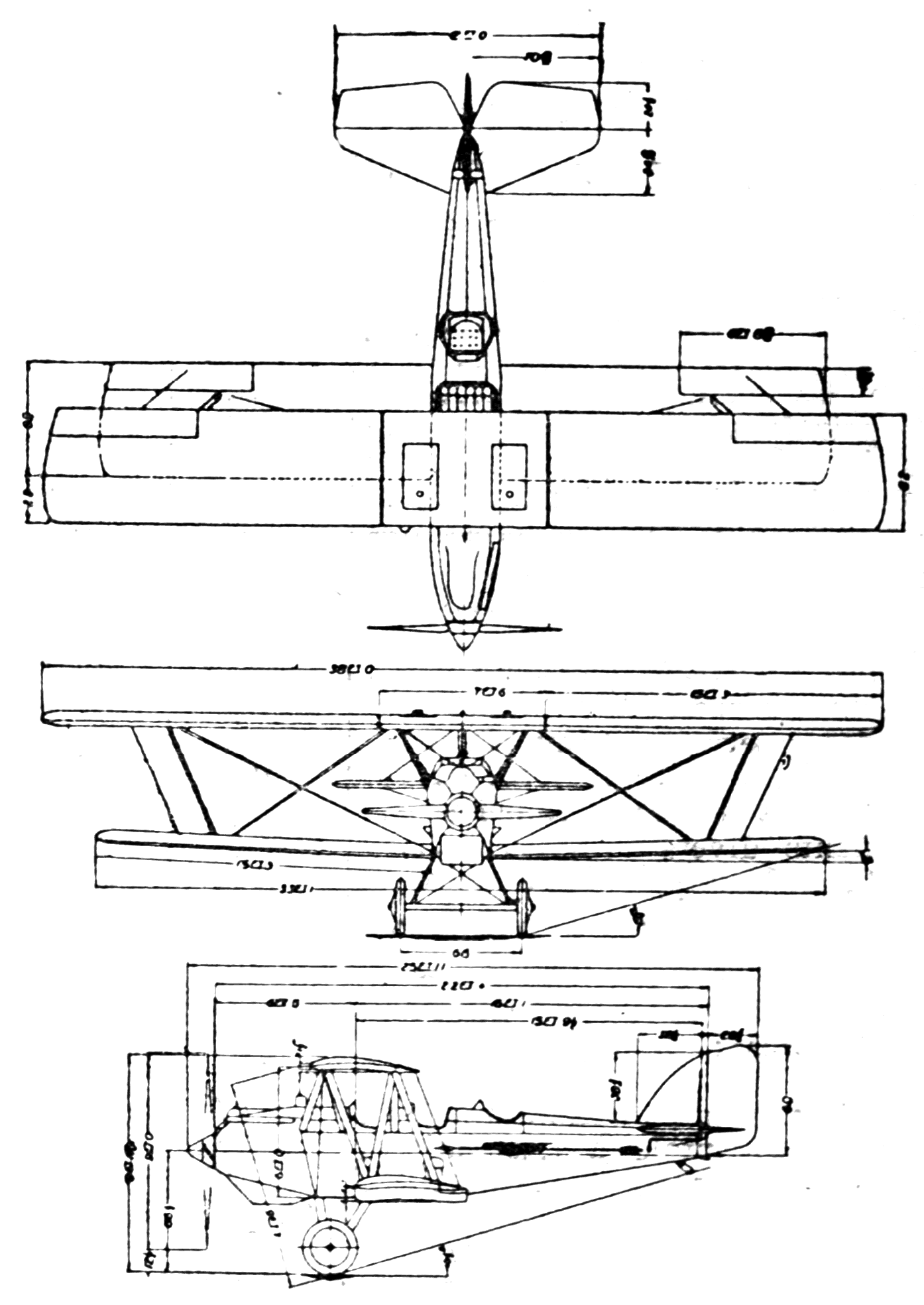
Pitcairn PA-1 Fleetwing 3-view drawing from L'Air June 15,1926

Data from Aerofiles

General characteristics

- Capacity: 5
- Length: 25 ft 11 in (7.90 m)
- Wingspan: 38 ft (12 m)
- Powerplant: 1 × Curtiss C-6 , 160 hp (120 kW)

Performance

- Maximum speed: 96 kn (110 mph, 180 km/h)
- Cruise speed: 81 kn (93 mph, 150 km/h)
- Stall speed: 39 kn (45 mph, 72 km/h)
