= Cierva W.5 =

Type of helicopter

The Cierva W.5 was a helicopter developed by the Cierva Autogiro Company in the United Kingdom. It was a single seater twin rotor helicopter- the rotors were mounted side-by-side on outriggers- with a wooden frame. It was powered by a 50 hp 4-cylinder air-cooled Weir engine. Its first flight was at Dalrymple, Ayrshire, on 7 June 1938, and it is considered to have been the world's second fully practical helicopter.

Pitch and Yaw control was achieved by tilting the rotor disks, roll control by differential pitch input to the rotors. Rotor thrust was controlled directly by the motor speed, which damped the response heavily.
