= Pitcairn PCA-2 =

Autogyro developed in the United States

PCA-2
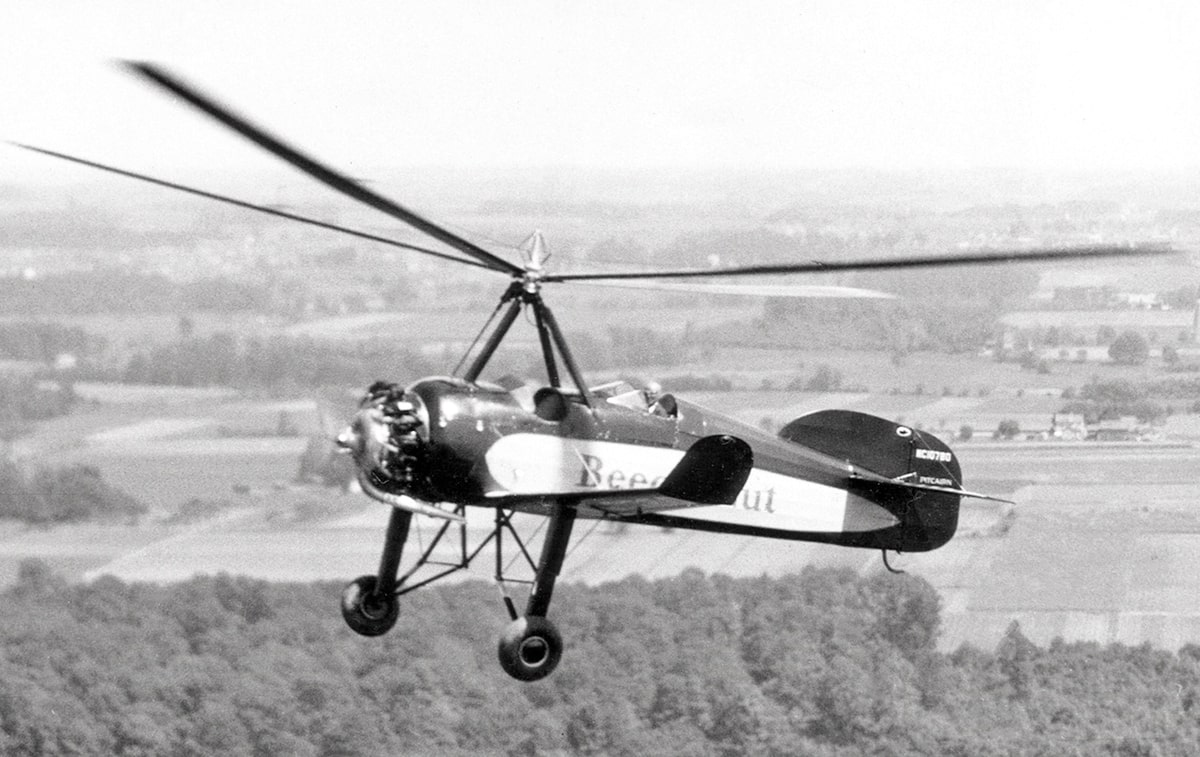
- A PCA-2 operated by the Beech-Nut corporation

General information
- Type: Utility autogyro
- National origin: United States
- Manufacturer: Pitcairn-Cierva Autogiro Company
- Designer: Harold F. Pitcairn
- Number built: 20–30

History
- First flight: 1931
- Variant: Pitcairn OP-1

The Pitcairn PCA-2 was an autogyro (designated as "autogiro" by Pitcairn) developed in the United States in the early 1930s. It was Harold F. Pitcairn's first autogyro design to be sold in quantity. It had a conventional design for its day – an airplane-like fuselage with two open cockpits in tandem, and an engine mounted tractor-fashion in the nose. The lift by the four-blade main rotor was augmented by stubby, low-set monoplane wings that also carried the control surfaces. The wingtips featured considerable dihedral that acted as winglets for added stability.

== Operational history ==
The PCA-2 was the first rotary-wing aircraft to achieve type certification in the United States and was used in a number of high-profile activities including a landing on the White House lawn and the first flight across the United States in a rotorcraft. This latter feat was attempted by Amelia Earhart, flying for the Beech-Nut food company, but was actually accomplished by John M Miller who completed his flight nine days before Earhart on 28 May 1931, in his PCA-2 named Missing Link. Learning of Miller's achievement upon her arrival in California, Earhart set out to turn her flight into a round-trip record by flying east again, but abandoned the attempt after three crashes. Earhart set an altitude record in a PCA-2 on 8 April 1931 with a height of 18,415 ft (5,615 m). This record was broken in another PCA-2 by Lewis Yancey who flew to 21,500 ft (6,600 m) on 25 September 1932.

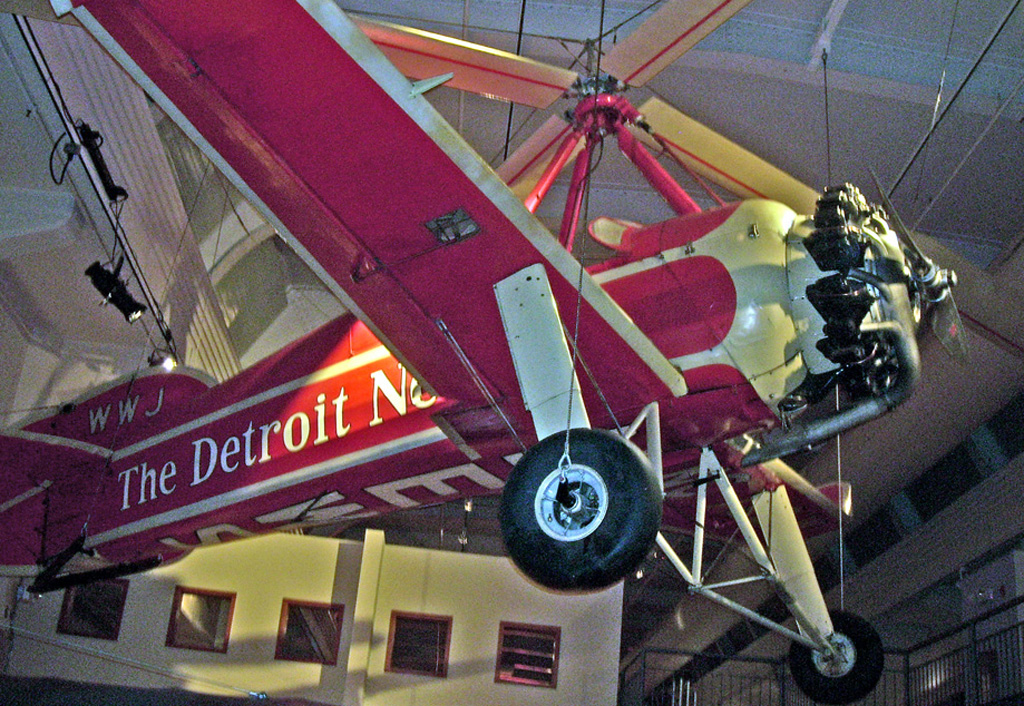
PCA-2 operated by the Detroit News, displayed at the Henry Ford Museum in Dearborn, MI.

In 1931, The Detroit News made history when it bought a PCA-2 for use as a news aircraft due to its ability to fly well at low altitude, land and take off from restricted spaces, and semi-hover for better camera shots. In May 1933, Scripps donated the autogyro to the Henry Ford Museum in Dearborn, Michigan.

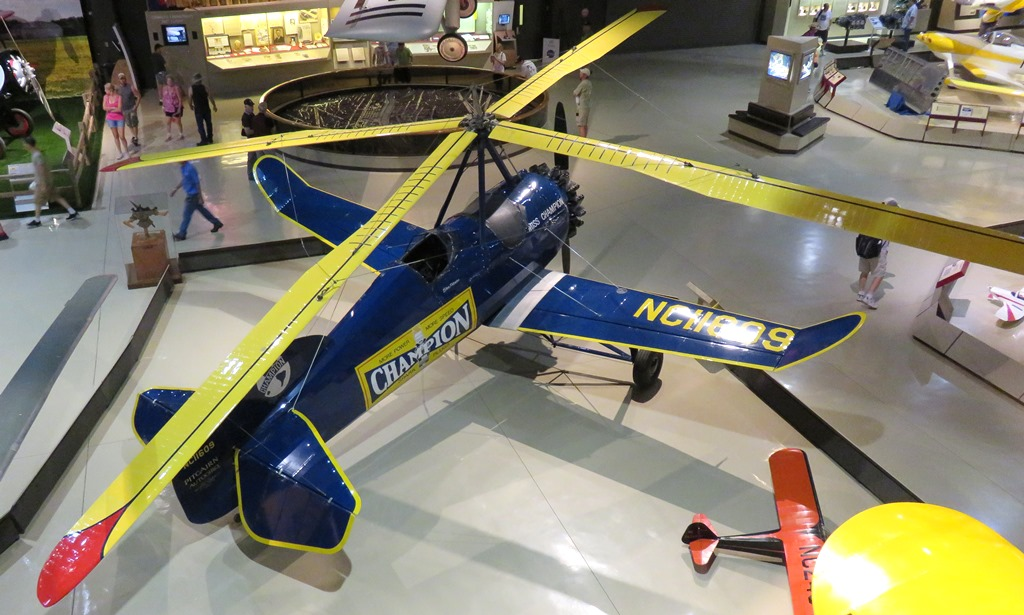
Pitcairn PCA-2 Miss Champion on display

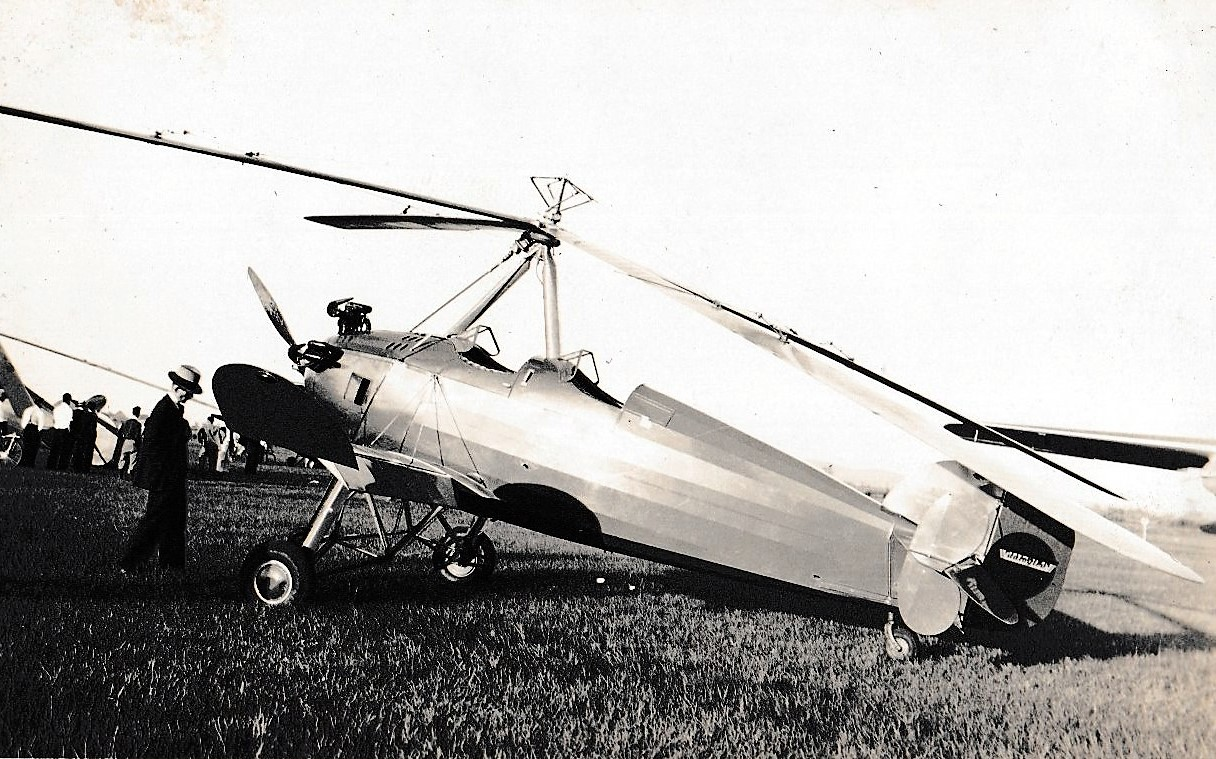
Pitcairn autogyro NC-12681 at St. Hubert, Quebec. Aug. 19, 1932

The Champion spark plug company operated a PCA-2 as a promotional machine in 1931 and 1932 as Miss Champion. It was flown over 6,500 miles in the 1931 Ford National Reliability Air Tour. This machine was restored to flying condition in 1982 by Steve Pitcairn, Harold's son. In 2005, he donated it to the EAA AirVenture Museum. Other PCA-2s are preserved at The Henry Ford and the Canada Aviation Museum.

== Variants ==
- PCA-2 – major production version
- PCA-3 – version with Pratt & Whitney Wasp Junior engine and 48-ft (14.63-m) rotor (1 built)
- PA-21 – version with Wright R-975-E2 engine
- OP-1 – Reconnaissance autogyro (1931); two aircraft acquired by the United States Navy (USN) in 1931 for trials, with limited success.

== Operators (OP-1) ==
United States

- United States Marine Corps
  - Marine Observation Squadron 6

== Specifications (PCA-2) ==
Data from

General characteristics

- Crew: One pilot
- Capacity: 2 passengers
- Length: 23 ft 1 in (7.04 m)
- Wingspan: 30 ft 0 in (9.14 m)
- Airfoil: NACA M-3 mod
- Empty weight: 2,233 lb (1,013 kg)
- Gross weight: 3,000 lb (1,361 kg)
- Powerplant: 1 × Wright R-975 (J6-9) 9-cylinder air-cooled radial piston engine, 330 hp (250 kW)
- Main rotor diameter: 45 ft 0 in (13.72 m)
- Main rotor area: 1,580 sq ft (147 m^{2}) 4-bladed wire braced rotor
- Propellers: 2-bladed fixed pitch wooden propeller

Performance

- Maximum speed: 120 mph (190 km/h, 100 kn)
- Range: 290 mi (470 km, 250 nmi)
- Service ceiling: 15,010 ft (4,575 m)
- Maximum glide ratio: 4.8

== See also ==
Related development

- Pitcairn OP

Aircraft of comparable role, configuration, and era

- Buhl A-1 Autogyro
- Cierva C.19
- Pitcairn PA-18
