= Pitcairn PA-19 =

PA-19

General information
- Type: Utility autogyro
- National origin: United States
- Manufacturer: Pitcairn
- Designer: Robert Noorduyn
- Number built: 5

History
- First flight: September 1932

The Pitcairn PA-19 was a four-seat autogyro developed in the United States in the early 1930s. While most of Pitcairn's autogyro designs featured open cockpits in tandem, the PA-19 had a fully enclosed cabin. It also had wings that carried control surfaces. The rotor provided lift only, but could be tilted in flight to trim the aircraft. Four examples were built before the effects of the Great Depression forced Pitcairn to abandon autogyro production in 1934.

Henry Latham Doherty purchased one to promote his "Florida Year-Round Clubs", while the Guinness Brewery purchased two. Colonel Robert L. Montgomery purchased one to commute between his homes, and Pitcairn Aviation kept one as a demonstrator.

== Specifications ==
Data from "Pitcairn, A G A, Pitcairn-Cierva, Pitcairn-Larsen"

General characteristics

- Crew: One pilot
- Capacity: 3-4 passengers
- Length: 25 ft 9 in (7.85 m)
- Wingspan: 38 ft 8 in (11.79 m)
- Powerplant: 1 × Wright R-975-E2 , 420 hp (310 kW)
- Main rotor diameter: 50 ft 8 in (15.44 m)
- Main rotor area: 2,014 sq ft (187.2 m^{2})

Performance

- Maximum speed: 120 mph (190 km/h, 100 kn)
- Range: 350 mi (560 km, 300 nmi)
