= Agnew E. Larsen =

American engineer

Agnew Emiel Larsen
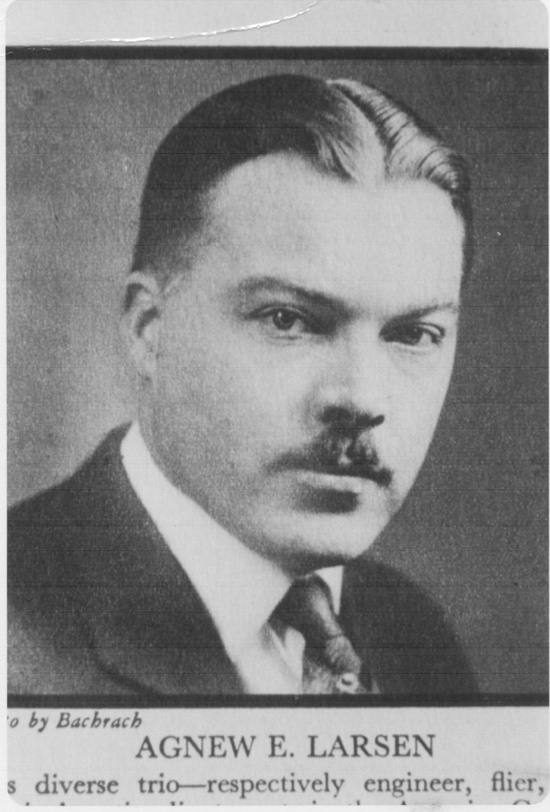
- Born: April 3, 1897
- Died: August 17, 1969 (aged 72); Philadelphia
- Citizenship: American
- Occupation: Aircraft Engineer
- Employer: Pitcairn Aircraft Company
- Known for: Pitcairn Biplane and Autogiro Designs
- Spouse: Mae
- Children: 3

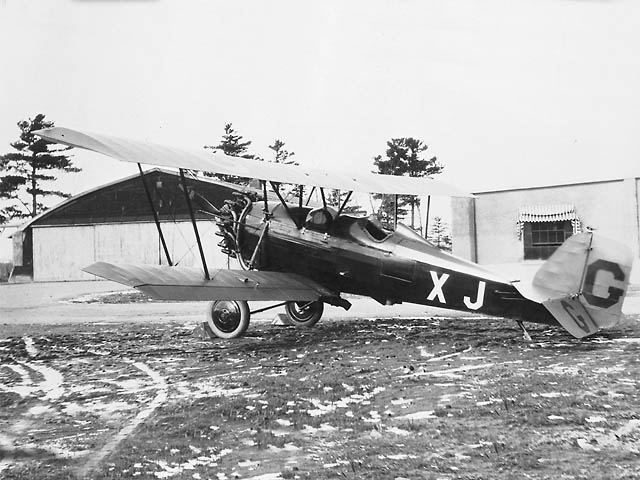
A PA-5 Mailwing designed by Larsen

Agnew Emiel Larsen (April 3, 1897 – August 17, 1969) was an American aircraft engineer who designed a series of pioneering airmail aircraft, and engineered progressive improvements to rotary wing aircraft that are in use in most modern helicopters currently. Larson invented an inflatable gyrocopter parachute that was featured in Popular Mechanics.

== Biography ==
He was born on April 3, 1897.

In 1916 Harold Pitcairn attended an apprenticeship at Curtiss Aeroplane and Motor Company, becoming friends with Larsen.

In 1925 Larsen and Pitcairn approached Cierva about licensing autogiro technology.

In 1927, longtime friend, Pitcairn approached Larsen to leave the Thomas-Morse Aircraft company, to join Pitcairn Aircraft Company as chief engineer. Larson developed the Pitcairn PA-1 Fleetwing, the first of a long series of biplanes for Pitcairn.

In 1930, Larsen won the Collier Trophy along with Pitcairn for the work on autogiro technology.

1947 Larsen merges his company rotawings with the Glenn L. Martin Company.

Larsen died from cancer on August 17, 1969, in Jenkintown, Pennsylvania.

== Legacy ==
Greg Larsen, Agnew E. Larson's grandson is a business development manager for the Hagerstown, MD, Regional Airport founding Pittsburgh Institute of Aeronautics school for aircraft technicians.
