= Pitcairn PAA-1 =

PAA-1
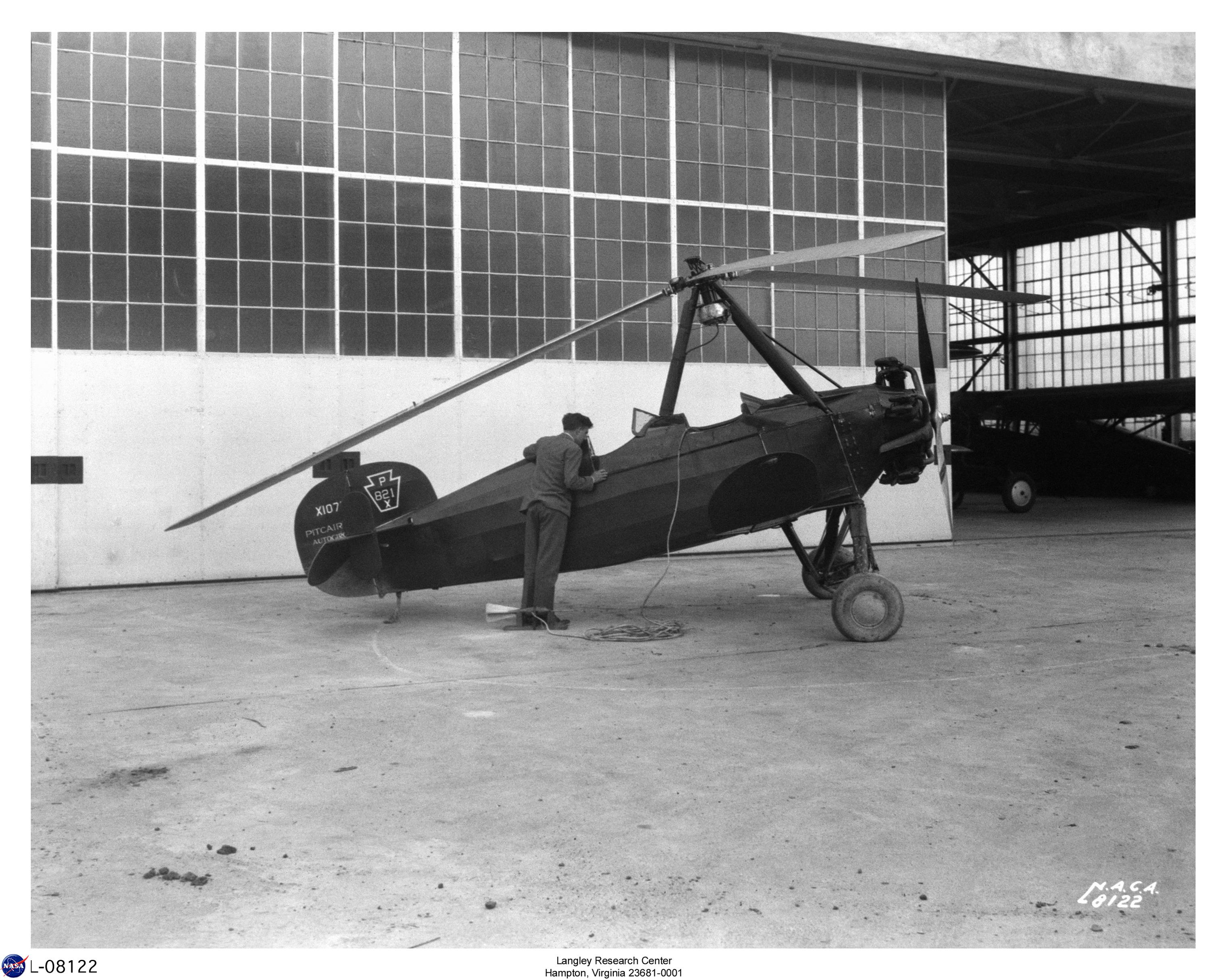
- This Pitcairn PAA-1 autogiro was flown at Langley for the NACA investigation of an experimental cantilevered three-bladed rotor. June 1943.

General information
- Type: Sport autogyro
- National origin: United States
- Manufacturer: Pitcairn-Cierva Autogiro Company
- Number built: 25

History
- First flight: 1931

The Pitcairn PAA-1 was an autogyro developed in the United States in the early 1930s. Of similar configuration to Pitcairn's earlier machines, the PAA-1 had an airplane-like fuselage with two open cockpits in tandem and a tractor-mounted engine in the nose. It was also equipped with small wings, which carried control surfaces, rather than using the rotor for flight control. It was a smaller and lighter machine than its predecessors and was designed specifically with private pilots in mind.

== Variants ==
- PAA-1 - main production version with Kinner B-5 engine
- PA-20 - improved version with Kinner R-5 engine
- PA-24 - version with twin tails and Kinner R-5 engine, modified from existing PAA-1s and PA-20s

== Specifications ==
Data from "Pitcairn, A G A, Pitcairn-Cierva, Pitcairn-Larsen"

General characteristics

- Crew: One pilot
- Capacity: 1 passenger
- Length: 18 ft 7 in (5.66 m)
- Wingspan: 22 ft 9 in (6.93 m)
- Powerplant: 1 × Kinner B-5 , 125 hp (93 kW)
- Main rotor diameter: 37 ft 0 in (11.28 m)
- Main rotor area: 10.75 sq ft (99.9 m^{2})

Performance

- Maximum speed: 90 mph (140 km/h, 78 kn)
- Range: 250 mi (400 km, 220 nmi)
- Service ceiling: 10,000 ft (3,000 m)
