= Central Airport (film) =

1933 film

- Theatrical film poster
- Directed by: William A. Wellman; Alfred E. Green (fill-in)
- Screenplay by: Rian James; James Seymour
- Based on: "Hawk's Mate" (story) by Jack Moffitt
- Produced by: Hal B. Wallis
- Starring: Richard Barthelmess; Sally Eilers; Tom Brown
- Cinematography: Sidney Hickox
- Edited by: James B. Morley
- Production company: Warner Bros. Pictures
- Distributed by: Warner Bros. Pictures
- Release date: April 15, 1933
- Running time: 70, 72 or 75 minutes
- Country: United States
- Language: English
- Budget: $421,000
- Box office: $747,000

Central Airport is a 1933 American pre-Code aviation drama film directed by William A. Wellman, with uncredited fill-in direction by Alfred E. Green, and written by Rian James and James Seymour based on the John C. "Jack" Moffitt story, "Hawk's Mate". The film stars Richard Barthelmess, Sally Eilers and Tom Brown. Central Airport was produced by Warner Bros. Pictures, which released it on April 15, 1933.

John Wayne has an uncredited part in the film, playing a co-pilot, and this film features his first on-screen death.

== Plot ==
After his aircraft crashes in a thunderstorm, commercial pilot Jim Blaine is blackballed and unable to find a job flying. Depressed, he begins working as a bank teller until he meets beautiful Jill Collins, a barnstorming parachutist working with her daredevil pilot brother. Jim is immediately attracted to Jill, and when her brother is killed in a freak crash, he reveals his past and volunteers to replace her dead sibling in their act. As they tour throughout the Southwest, their affection turns physically intimate.

Jim, believes that his risky lifestyle precludes the luxury of a wife and family while Jill wants marriage. When Jim's brother Neil "Bud" joins them, he too is immediately attracted to Jill, but respects his brother's relationship; but after another freak accident puts Jim in the hospital for a prolonged convalescence, Jim returns to find them married and in bed together. Angry and bitter, he becomes a soldier of fortune and loses an eye and a leg flying for the Communist rebels in China and Chile.

After a prolonged estrangement, a chastened Jim goes to Cuba to rejoin Bud and Jill but finds his brother's aircraft has gone down in a storm in the Gulf of Mexico. With only a short window of opportunity to save Bud and his passengers, Jim volunteers to go into the storm to save his brother.

After finding the downed aircraft and saving all the passengers, he flies back but a heavy fog comes in and Jim cannot see well enough to land. All the cars in the city then line up in an old airfield, and with the help of their headlights and horns, Jim lands safely. Realizing how much Bud loves Jill, Jim leaves town again, but this time on better terms with his brother.

== Cast ==
- Richard Barthelmess as James "Jim" Blaine
- Sally Eilers as Jill Collins
- Tom Brown as Neil "Bud" Blaine
- Grant Mitchell as Mr. Blaine
- James Murray as Eddie Hughes
- Claire McDowell as Mrs. Blaine
- Willard Robertson as Havana Airport Manager
- Arthur Vinton as Amarillo Airport Manager
- Louise Beavers as Hotel Maid (uncredited)
- Harrison Greene as Pomona Air Circus Announcer (uncredited)
- Fred Toones as El Paso Craps Shooter (uncredited)
- John Wayne as co-pilot in aircraft wreck (uncredited)
- Lester Dorr as hotel desk clerk (uncredited)

== Production ==
The film's working title was Grand Central Airport. It was shot over a 30 day period at the cost of $365,000. When director William Wellman was sick with the flu, Alfred E. Green substituted for him. Actor Milton Kibbee, the lesser-known brother of actor Guy Kibbee made his film debut in this picture.

An air crash scene was dropped from the film after it was found to be harmful to the travel industry by the aviation board of the Los Angeles Chamber of Commerce.

Location shooting on Central Airport took place at Wilson Airport and United Airport, Burbank, California. The film showcased a number of contemporary aircraft, all gathered under the direction of noted Hollywood pilot Paul Mantz. The aircraft included:

- Alexander Eaglerock
- American Eagle A-101
- Fairchild 71
- four Ford Tri-motor three-engined airliners
- Pitcairn PA-5 Mailwing
- Stearman C3
- two Travel Air 4000 biplanes

Aviation film historian Stephen Pendo in From the Wright Brothers to Top Gun: Aviation, Nationalism, and Popular Cinema (1995), considered that Central Airport "proved to be one of Paul Mantz's most dangerous films." Two crashes punctuated the action and in one of them, Mantz suffered a broken collar bone when he rolled out of a careening aircraft and was struck by the tailwheel.

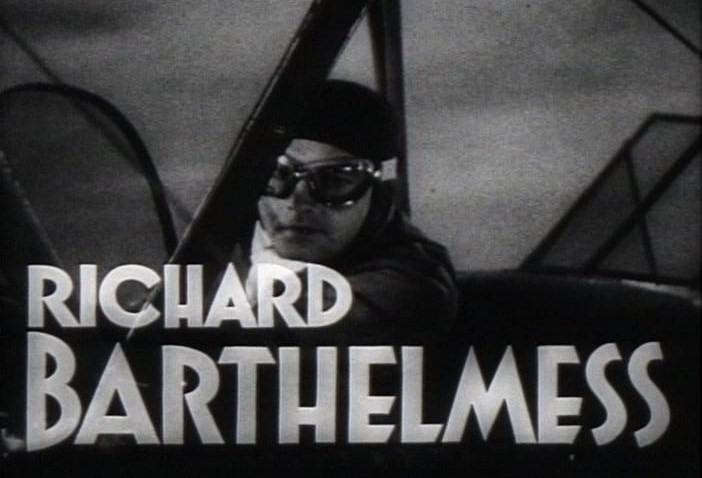

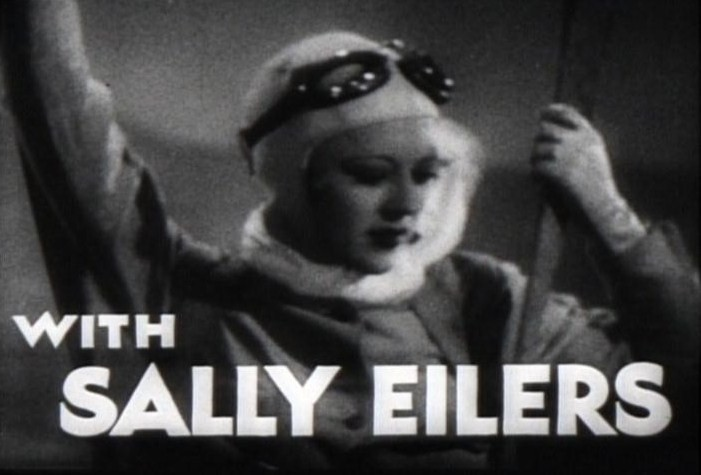

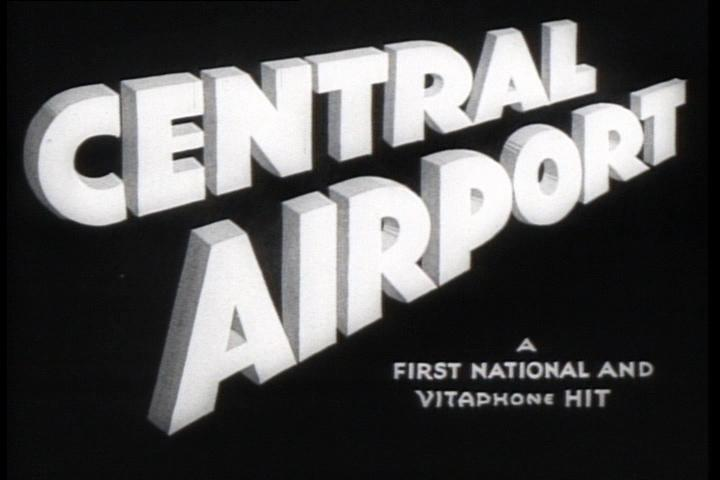

== Reception ==
Mordaunt Hall in his review of Central Airport for The New York Times, did not see it as more than "... a most obvious affair". The only redeeming aspect was an exciting final scene: "This closing sequence, which takes place in Havana waters, is moderately effective, with scores of automobiles all tooting their horns to direct the aviator lost in the supposedly thick fog."

Aviation film historian Michael Paris in Celluloid Wings: The Impact of Movies on Aviation (1984), considered Central Airport as "... the first feature to look seriously at civil aviation ... it does show something of the background of the development of air transport and the workings of a busy commercial airport."

=== Box office ===
According to Warner Bros, Central Airport earned $393,000 domestically and $354,000 foreign.

=== Preservation ===
- The Library of Congress has an archived print of Central Airport.
