= Stearman C2 =

1920's American Aircraft

C2
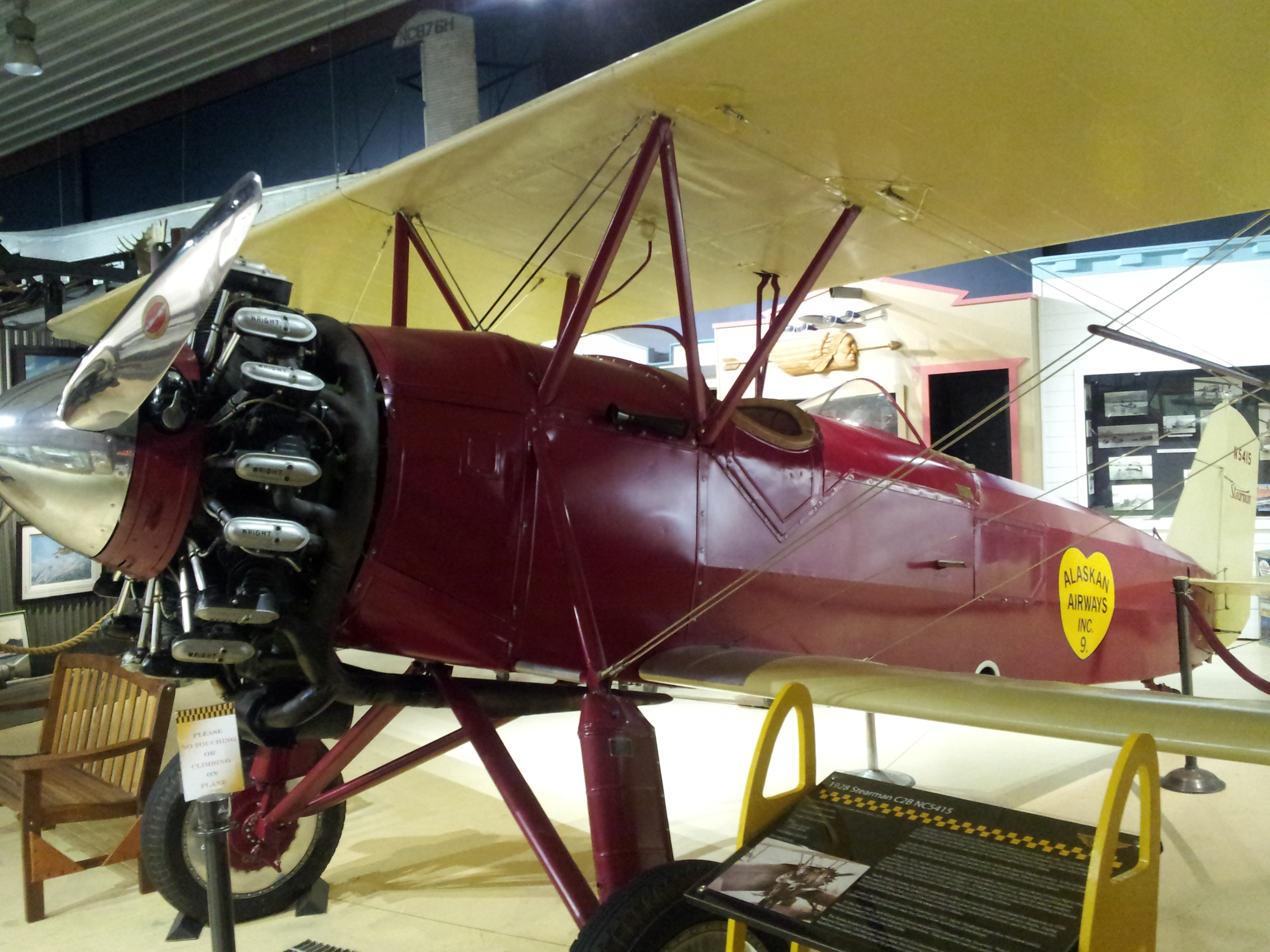
- Stearman C2B on display in Anchorage, Alaska.

General information
- Type: 3-seat commercial biplane
- National origin: United States
- Manufacturer: Stearman Aircraft Corp.
- Status: Retired
- Number built: 33

History
- Introduction date: 1927
- First flight: March 1927
- Developed from: Stearman C1
- Developed into: Stearman C3

The Stearman C2 is an American single-engine three-seat open-cockpit utility biplane, and was the second aircraft type produced by the Stearman Aircraft company. The aircraft first flew in 1927.

== Design and development ==
The airframe of the C2 was almost identical to the model C1. Aside from the engine installation, differences included an aileron push-pull rods that actuated the single pair of ailerons on the upper wings via torque tubes and bell cranks internal to the upper wings rather than using ones connected to the lower wings. Later C-series Stearmans retained this simpler system.

Various types of engines were installed, including both air cooled radials and water-cooled V-8s. Unlike the C1 that had the radiator mounted in the nose, C2s with radiators had them under the fuselage between the undercarriage legs.

When the type certification process resulted in the similar C3 becoming the first certified Stearman aircraft, some C2 aircraft were modified to C3B standard.

The most numerous version was the C2B which had a Wright J-5 radial engine.

The C2M ("M" for mail) was designed to meet the requirements of Varney Airlines, and Western Air Express, included having the front cockpit covered over and turned into a mail hold.

== Production ==
In total, 33 C2s were manufactured with the first three built in the original Stearman plant in Venice, California.

== Variants ==
C2/C2A
90 hp (67 kW) liquid-cooled Curtiss OX-5 water-cooled V-8 engine. Five built, one later converted to C2B standard. Individual airframes were used to test various engines, including the C2C's Wright-built Hispano-Suiza 8 (NC3440), the C2B's Wright Whirlwind (NC3922) and a Salmson radial engine.
C2B
200 hp (150 kW) Wright J-5 Whirlwind air-cooled radial. At least 20 built, plus one C2A converted to a C2B. At least 9 C2Bs were upgraded to C3B or C3MB standard to be certified, a requirement for continued use with commercial operations.
C2C
180 hp (130 kW) Wright-built Hispano-Suiza 8 water-cooled V-8. None built, but one C2 was test fitted with engine before being converted to C3C standard.
C2H (1929 ATC 137)
280 hp (210 kW) Menasco-Salmson air-cooled radial. One custom aircraft built, registered as NC5600, with experimental "speed wings". Later converted to C3B.
C2K (1929 ATC 2-53)
125 hp (93 kW) Siemens-Halske SH-12 radial engine. 2 built, both later converted to C3 standard.
C2MB
Mailplane with front cockpit as mail hold with a 220 hp (160 kW) Wright J-5 radial. No aircraft were registered as C2MBs and no ATC number was issued which would have been mandatory for commercial mail operations.

== Operators ==
The majority were operated by sportsmen, and the type was marketed specifically to hunters. Commercial operators included:

- American Airways
- National Parks Airways
- Pacific Alaska Airways
- Quick Aviation Company (crop dusting)
- Western Air Express

== Aircraft on display ==
- Stearman C2B NC5415 serial 121, in Alaskan Airways markings at the Alaska Aviation Museum, Anchorage, Alaska.

== Specifications (Stearman C2B) ==
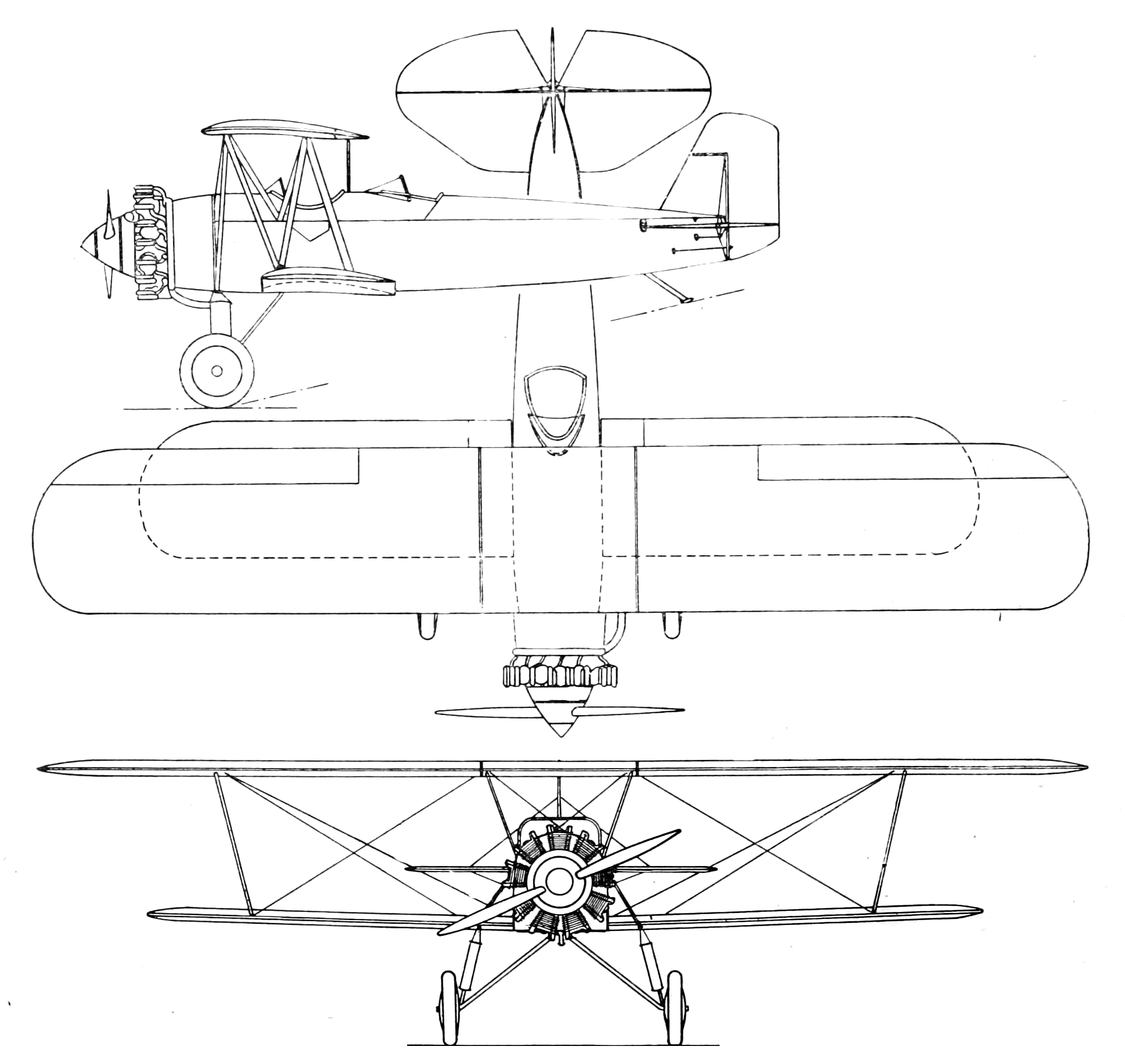
Stearman C2B 3-view drawing from Aero Digest May 1928

Data from Bowen Jr., R. Sydney, ed. (21 May 1928). "The Stearman biplane". Aviation Week. Vol. XXIV, no. 21. New York City: Aviation Publishing Corp. pp. 1454, 1470–1471, 1479–1480.

General characteristics

- Crew: One
- Capacity: 2 passengers and baggage
- Length: 23 ft 2 in (7.06 m)
- Upper wingspan: 35 ft 0 in (10.67 m)
- Upper wing chord: 5 ft 6 in (1.68 m)
- Upper wing dihedral: 0.0°
- Wing incidence (upper and lower): 2.0°
- Lower wingspan: 28 ft 0 in (8.53 m)
- Lower wing chord: 4 ft 6 in (1.37 m)
- Lower wing dihedral: 2.0°
- Height: 9 ft 2.5 in (2.807 m)
- Wing area: 297 sq ft (27.6 m^{2})
- Airfoil: Stearman section
- Empty weight: 1,438 lb (652 kg)
- Gross weight: 2,450 lb (1,111 kg)
- Maximum load: 500 lb (230 kg)
- Fuel capacity: 68 US gal (260 L; 57 imp gal)
- Undercarriage track: 7 ft 6 in (2.29 m)
- Powerplant: 1 × Wright J-5 Whirlwind air-cooled radial engine, 200 hp (150 kW)
- Propellers: 2-bladed metal Hamilton or Curtiss-Reid fixed-pitch propeller

Performance

- Maximum speed: 130 mph (210 km/h, 110 kn) at full load
- Cruise speed: 110 mph (180 km/h, 96 kn)
- Stall speed: 35 mph (56 km/h, 30 kn)
- Minimum control speed: 41 mph (66 km/h, 36 kn)
- Range: 620 mi (1,000 km, 540 nmi)
- Service ceiling: 18,000 ft (5,500 m)
- Rate of climb: 1,000 ft/min (5.1 m/s) at sea level
- Wing loading: 8.25 lb/sq ft (40.3 kg/m^{2})
- Fuel consumption: 11.5 US gal (44 L; 9.6 imp gal)/hr

== See also ==
=== Aircraft of comparable role, configuration and era ===
(Partial listing, only covers most numerous types)

- Alexander Eaglerock
- American Eagle A-101
- Brunner-Winkle Bird
- Buhl-Verville CA-3 Airster
- Command-Aire 3C3
- Parks P-1
- Pitcairn Mailwing
- Spartan C3
- Swallow New Swallow
- Travel Air 2000 and 4000
- Waco 10

=== Related lists ===
- List of aircraft
- List of civil aircraft
