= Eagles Mere Air Museum =

Coordinates: 41.4167°N 76.5335°W

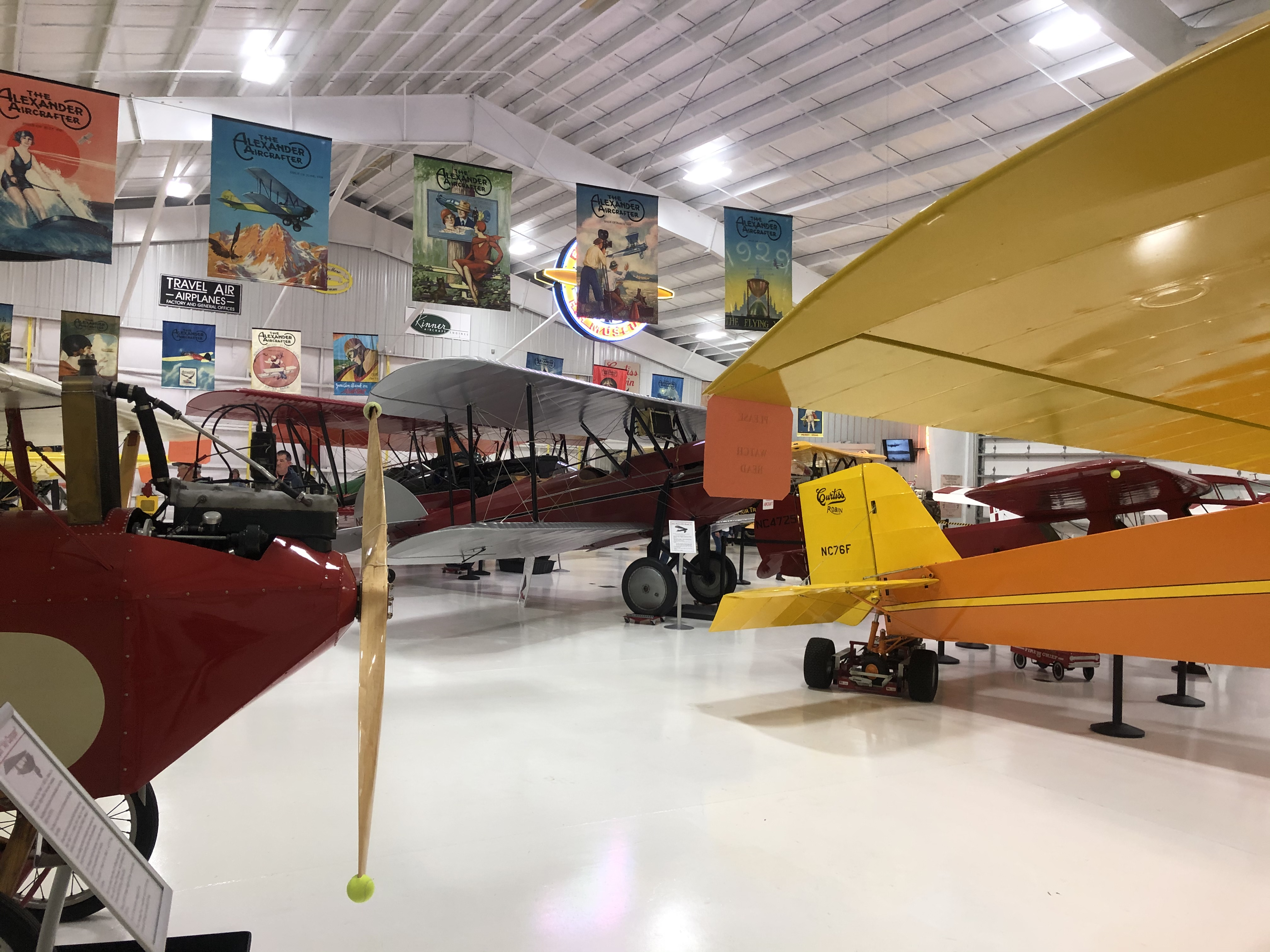
- Established: July 2002
- Location: Merritt Field (Pennsylvania), Eagles Mere, Pennsylvania, USA
- Type: Air museum
- Website: https://www.eaglesmereairmuseum.com

Eagles Mere Air Museum is an aviation museum located on Merritt Field on the outskirts of Eagles Mere, Pennsylvania in North Central Pennsylvania. The museum has 35 vintage aircraft from 1913 to 1944, as well as hundreds of other aviation related items pertaining to that era, including photos, engines and aircraft components.

== Overview ==
The museum is located in three buildings, "Alpha hangar" is the largest which has 12 aircraft on display, the museum's admissions and gift shop is also located here. "Bravo hangar" holds five more aircraft and features videos of the museum and airport construction and early years. "Charlie hangar" has another four aircraft. "Delta hangar" also has four aircraft on display and "Echo hangar" holds three aircraft.

== Collection ==
As of mid-2019 the museums collection includes:

- Aeronca C-3
- Aeronca L-3
- Alexander Eaglerock
- Boeing-Stearman Model 75
- Brunner-Winkle Bird
- Cessna Model A
- Curtiss Robin
- Curtiss Fledgling
- Curtiss-Wright Junior
- De Havilland Tiger Moth
- Pitcairn PA-3 Orowing
- Pitcairn PA-4 Fleetwing II
- Piper J-3 Cub
- Swanson Coupe
- Taylor J-2
- Travel Air 2000
- Travel Air 5000
- Kinner Sportwing
- Waco 10
- Waco Standard

== See also ==
- List of aerospace museums
- Aviation in Pennsylvania
