= Spartan C3 =

American 1920s three-seat utility biplane

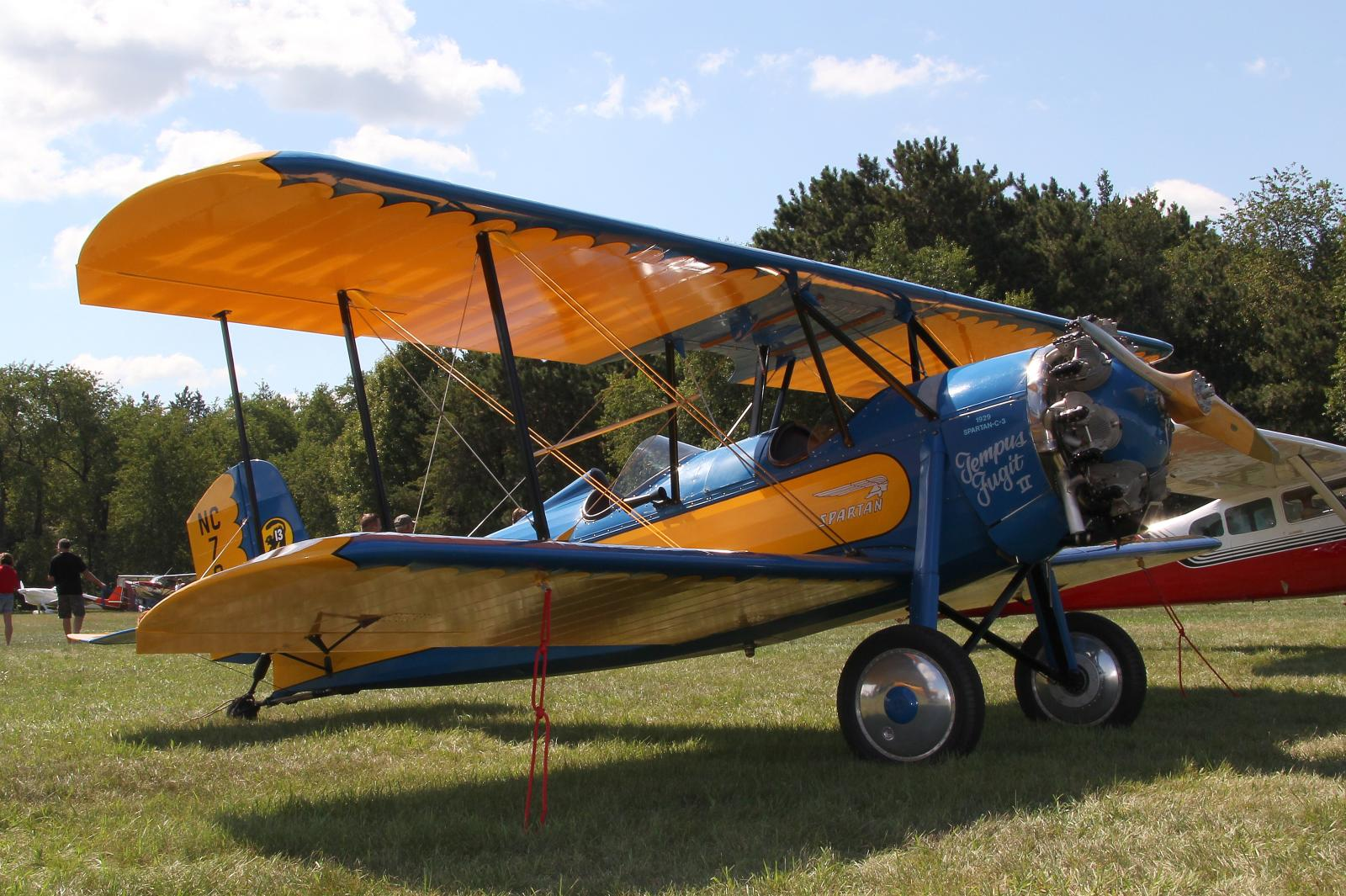

General information
- Type: Open cockpit biplane
- National origin: United States
- Manufacturer: Spartan Aircraft Company
- Designer: Willis C. Brown
- Status: retired
- Number built: approx 122

History
- Introduction date: 1928
- First flight: 25 October 1926
- Developed into: Spartan NP

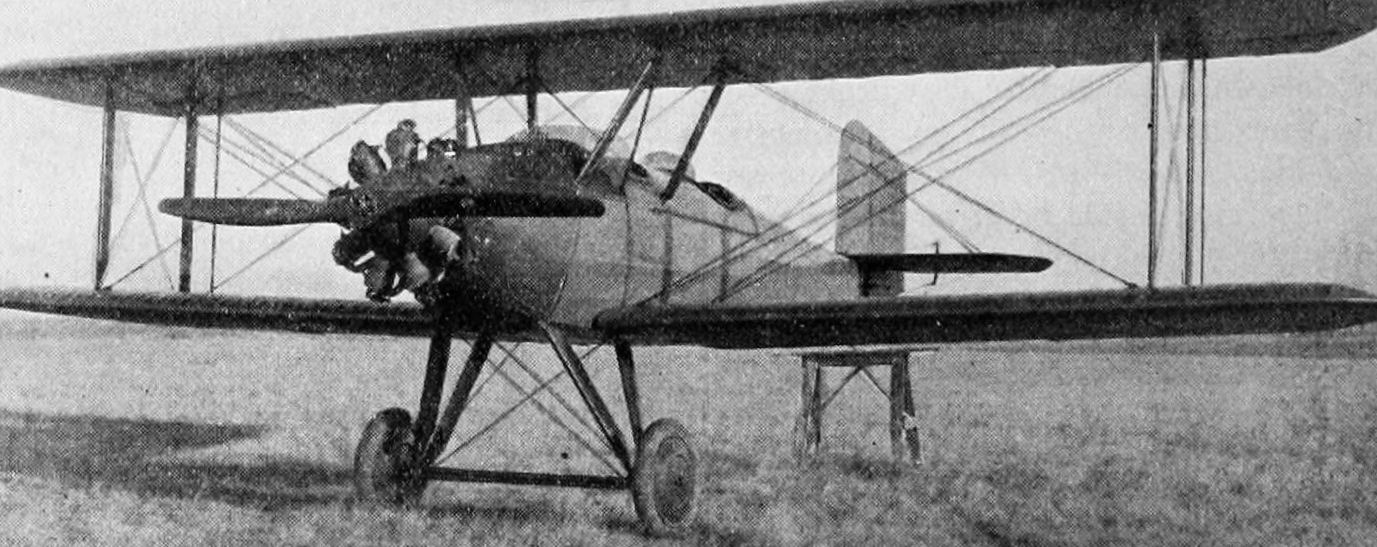
prototype powered by a radial Super Rhone

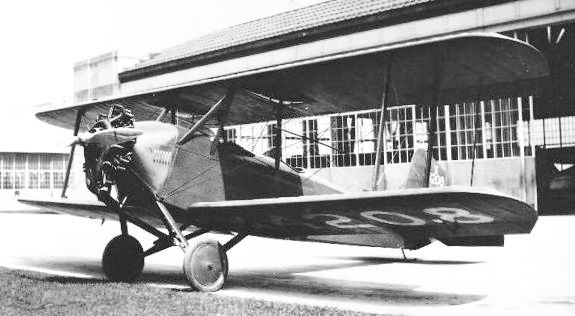
Ryan-Siemens Sh-14-powered C3-1

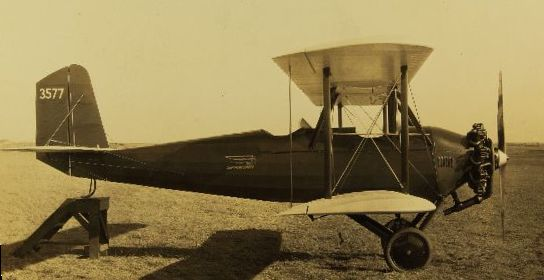
Walter NZ 120-powered C3-2

The Spartan C3 is an American three-seat open-cockpit utility biplane from the late 1920s.

== Design ==
The C3s fuselage and wing struts were built up from welded chromium-molybdenum alloy steel tubes, faired with wood battens. It had two open cockpits each protected from the wind with generously sized shatterproof-glass windscreens, and which could accommodated three people, with two in the front cockpit.

The wings on the prototype were built around spruce and plywood box beam spars that were replaced with solid spruce spars routed into I-beams on production examples. Ribs were built up from spruce and plywood, while on the C3-225, duraluminium sheet covered the leading edge of the wing to improve the aerodynamic form. The wings were braced with streamlined section steel wire. Both upper and lower wings used a Clark Y airfoil section, and had the same 32 ft (9.8 m) span and 60 in (1,500 mm) wing chord, with rounded wing tips. The wing was rigged without stagger, or washout and at a 0° angle of incidence. The upper wing was flat across, with no dihedral, while the lower wing had 2° of dihedral. Interconnected unbalanced ailerons were fitted to both wings inset from the wingtips. The rudder and elevators were constructed similarly to the wings.

Other than the metal panels around the nose, most of the airframe was covered in fabric that had been doped to tighten and seal it.

The fuel tank was fitted into the upper wing center section in such a way that it could be removed without removing the wings. On the C3-225, an additional removable fuel tank was added in the fuselage, and the wing tank acted as a header tank.

The prototype had a conventional undercarriage similar to those used on most World War One aircraft, with a pair of vees braced from the lower longerons, connected with a spreader bar and suspension provided by bungee cords. This was replaced with a split-axle undercarriage on the C3-1 and C3-2, which had the legs braced to the opposite lower longerons. From the C3-3 onwards, each undercarriage leg was triangulated with two struts braced to a central keel in the bottom of the fuselage, and one oleo strut on each side to the upper longeron, providing a greater range of movement and reducing camber changes. Early examples had a tail skid, while later ones had a tailwheel fitted.

The redesign of the undercarriage, and numerous other details changes coincided with Brown's visit to Europe to arrange for the use of the Siemens-Halske engine and had not been approved by him. He considered them unnecessary, and the fight over these changes led to his departure from the company.

The keel used to brace the undercarriage on the C3-3 and later models coincided with a deepening of the fuselage, with additional fairing strips added, including to the underside of the fuselage. A headrest would also be added for the rear cockpit on later models.

== Development ==
The privately developed prototype to the C3 series first flew on 25 October 1926, originally powered with a stationary radial engine modified in the US from a 80 hp (60 kW) Le Rhône 9C rotary engine called a Super Rhone. The use of various engines was anticipated from the start, although the planned Hispano-Wright E-2 water-cooled V-8 engine was never used and only radial-engine powered versions were flown.

Despite the low-power engine, the type showed sufficient promise to warrant the formation of the Mid-Continent Aircraft Company in Tulsa, Oklahoma, to produce it, which would in turn be bought out and reorganized by prominent oilman William Skelly as the Spartan Aircraft Company in 1928.

The search for a suitable powerplant led to a number of different engines being installed. When production started, the Ryan-Siemens radial engine was chosen, but production of that engine stalled due to the worsening economic situation in Germany, where it was manufactured. Even before the supply problems had manifested themselves, the next engine chosen, the Fairchild Caminez, had already been tried out, and was found to be extremely unreliable, so only one aircraft was fitted with it. The search for a reliable replacement for the Siemens led to the use of the more successful Walter NZ 120.

The Axelson A, Comet 7-E, and Curtiss Challenger were also offered and installed in a few airframes, but none of them was successful for service use. While the Walter was fitted to a significant number of the earlier airframes, as an import, it was never a popular engine in the United States and eventually the Wright Whirlwind supplanted it. The ultimate variant was the C3-225, which was fitted with a much more powerful 225 hp (168 kW) Wright J-6-7 Whirlwind seven-cylinder radial engine, and it was given a larger fin and a greatly enlarged fuel tank in the wing center section.

== Operational history ==
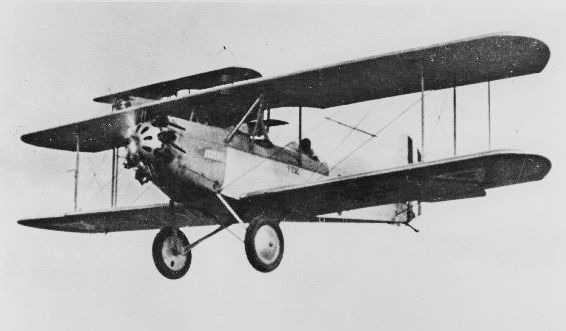
Fuerza Aerea Mexicana (Mexican Air Force) C3-120s

The C3 was used primarily by flight schools for flying training, including the Spartan School of Aeronautics. Other firms used the aircraft's ability to carry two passengers for barnstorming flights, the type was popular for shuttling crews around the oil fields, while some were used as air taxis. The Spartan was offered for sale for $6,750, which was later reduced to $5,975.

A C3-2 fitted with a large fuel tank in the front cockpit demonstrated its reliability by being flown nonstop from Walkersville, Ontario, in Canada to Key West, Florida, a distance of (1,220 miles (1,960 km)) in 17.5 hours in November 1928.

The financier behind the transformation of the Mid-Continent Aircraft company into Spartan, William Skelly, also purchased a number of C3s for the Skelly Oil Company's use.

The Fuerza Aerea Mexicana purchased four C3-120s in 1933 along with six of the later Spartan C2-175 monoplanes, and 5 other examples were exported to Mexico for commercial and private use, and at least one was operated by Aeronautica del Sur.

A single C3-225 was exported to Argentina, and both a C3-120 and a C3-225 went to Chile.

== Survivors and aircraft on display ==
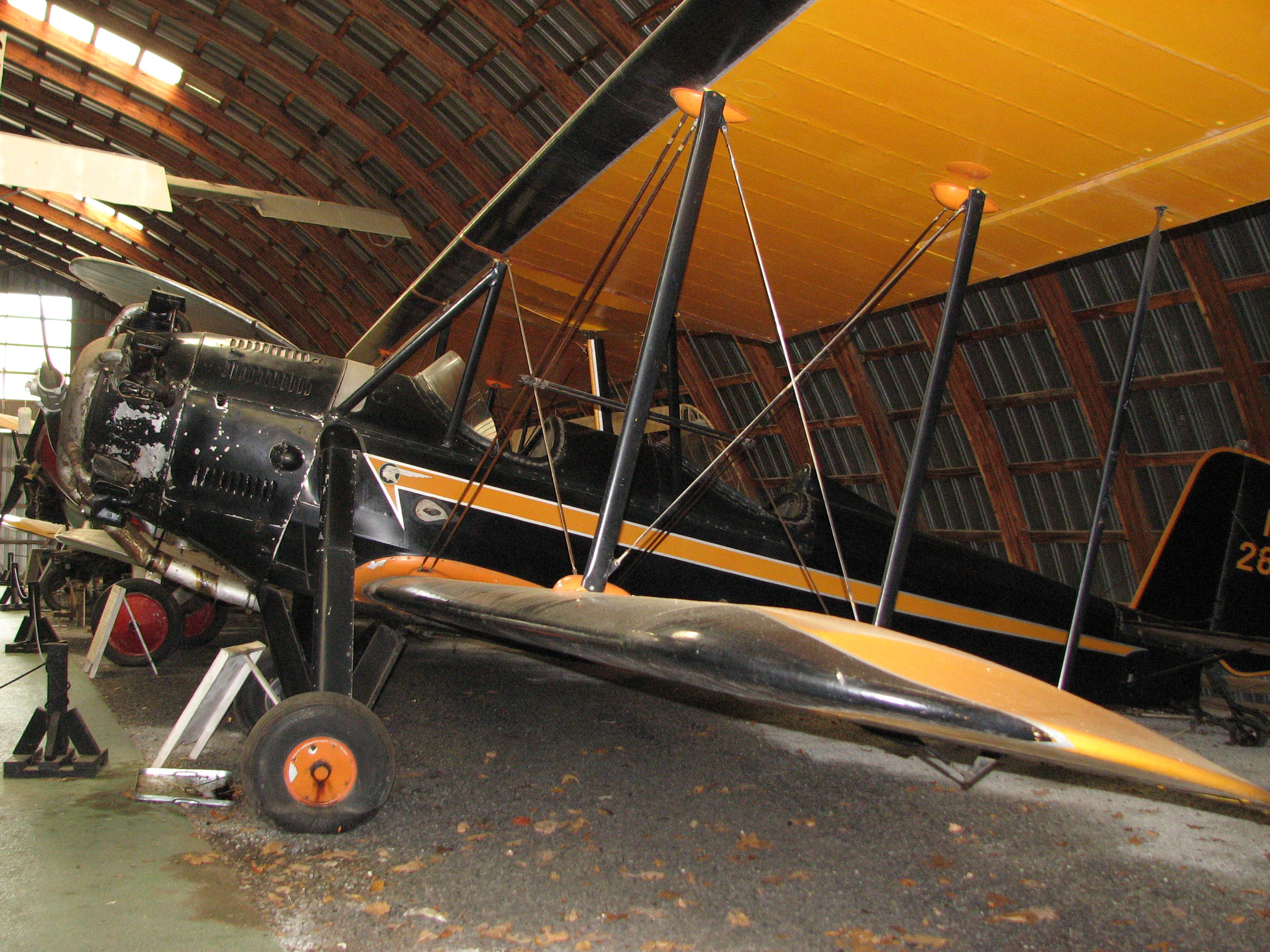
C3-165 NC285M on display at Old Rhinebeck

Five C3s survive, four in the United States, and one in Germany as of 2020, of which at least three were airworthy.

- MSN 99 C3-120 N271K, privately owned, is registered in Dubuque, Iowa, but stored pending restoration and replacement of its engine.
- MSN 120 C3-165 NC285M is on static display in the hangars at the Old Rhinebeck Aerodrome in Red Hook, New York.
- MSN 149 C3-165 NC705N, an airworthy example, is privately owned in Germany
- MSN A-12 C3-225 NC718N is airworthy and on display at the EAA AirVenture Museum in Oshkosh, Wisconsin. This aircraft was first operated by Halliburton as an aerial taxi on the oil fields, then sold to a private owner, then it went to the Spartan School of Aeronautics (which still exists) to provide flight training briefly before going to the Oklahoma Military Academy, which then passed it on to the Union Cotton Oil in 1940, which resold it a month later to the Burnham and Miller Flying Service, which used it during World War II training pilots in the Civilian Pilot Training Program. In 1948, it was modified for towing banners until being stored in 1953. It was restored in 2003–2004 to flying condition and subsequently donated to the museum.
- MSN A-14 C3-225 N720N was airworthy as of 2020, and is listed in the Spartan College of Aeronautics and Technology fleet. This aircraft was donated to the Tulsa Air and Space Museum, where it was displayed from 1998 until 2007. An extensive restoration from 2007 to 2011 subsequently returned it to flying status.

== Variants ==
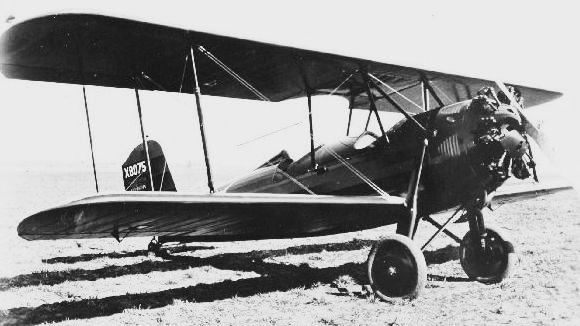
Curtiss Challenger-powered C3-3

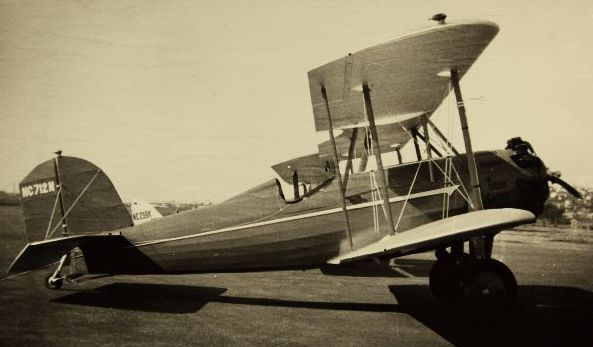
C3-225 showing larger rudder and deeper fuselage

(data from www.aerofiles.com)

C3
1926 120 hp (89 kW) Super Rhone radial engine - prototype, 1 built
C3-1 (Approved Type Certificate (ATC) 71)
1928 125 hp (93 kW) Ryan-Siemens Sh-14 7 cylinder radial - 15+ built (Note: Some sources suggest over 100 of the Ryan-Siemens powered C3s were built, however surviving records do not bear this out, per Juptner, 1964, p. 278.)
C3-2 (redesignated C3-120) (ATC 73)
1928 120 hp (89 kW) Walter NZ 120 9 cylinder radial - 35 C3-2 and C3-120 built, including one converted from C3-1
C3-3 (ATC 2-77)
1929 170 hp (130 kW) Curtiss Challenger 6 cylinder radial - 8 built
C3-4 (ATC 2-78)
1929 115 hp (86 kW)-150 Axelson A 7 cylinder radial - 2 built
C3-5 (redesignated C3-165) (ATC 195)
1929 165 hp (123 kW) Wright J-6-5 Whirlwind 5 cylinder radial - 45 built
C3-166 (ATC 290)
1929 165 hp (123 kW) Comet 7-E 7 cylinder radial - 1 converted from C3-165
C3-225 (ATC 286)
1930 225 hp (168 kW) Wright J-6-7 Whirlwind 7 cylinder radial - 14 built
undesignated models
several proposed but unbuilt variants were to have had Wright-Hispano-Suiza 8-derived engines installed.

== Specifications (Spartan C3-165) ==
Data from Juptner, 1964, pp. 276-278

General characteristics

- Crew: One
- Capacity: Two
- Length: 23 ft 10 in (7.26 m)
- Upper wingspan: 32 ft 0 in (9.75 m)
- Upper wing chord: 60 in (1.52 m)
- Upper wing dihedral: 0°
- Lower wingspan: 32 ft 0 in (9.75 m)
- Lower wing chord: 60 in (1.52 m)
- Lower wing dihedral: 2°
- Height: 8 ft 10 in (2.69 m)
- Wing area: 291 sq ft (27.0 m^{2})
- Airfoil: Clark Y
- Empty weight: 1,650 lb (748 kg)
- Gross weight: 2,618 lb (1,188 kg)
- Maximum load: 968 lb (439 kg)
- Fuel capacity: 65 US gal (250 L; 54 imp gal)
- Oil capacity: 6.5 US gal (25 L; 5.4 imp gal)
- Undercarriage track: 83 in (2.11 m)
- Powerplant: 1 × Wright J-6-5 Whirlwind 5 cylinder air-cooled radial engine, 165 hp (123 kW)
- Propellers: 2-bladed metal fixed-pitch propeller

Performance

- Maximum speed: 118 mph (190 km/h, 103 kn)
- Cruise speed: 100 mph (160 km/h, 87 kn)
- Stall speed: 47 mph (76 km/h, 41 kn)
- Range: 600 mi (970 km, 520 nmi)
- Service ceiling: 12,000 ft (3,700 m)
- Time to altitude:
  - 1 minute to 800 ft (240 m)
  - 10 minutes to 6,900 ft (2,100 m)

== See also ==
- 1926 in aviation

=== Related development ===
- Spartan NP

=== Aircraft of comparable role, configuration and era ===
(Partial listing, only covers most numerous types)

- Alexander Eaglerock
- American Eagle A-101
- Brunner-Winkle Bird
- Buhl-Verville CA-3 Airster
- Command-Aire 3C3
- Parks P-1
- Pitcairn Mailwing
- Stearman C2 and C3
- Swallow New Swallow
- Travel Air 2000 and 4000
- Waco 10

=== Related lists ===
- List of aircraft
- List of civil aircraft
