= Buhl-Verville CA-3 Airster =

CA-3 Airster
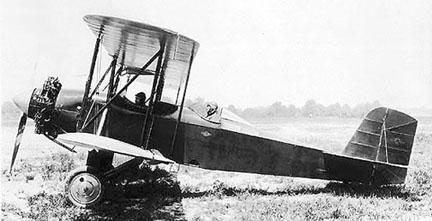

General information
- Type: Utility aircraft
- Manufacturer: Buhl
- Designer: Alfred Verville, Etienne Dormoy
- Number built: 20

History
- First flight: 1926

The Buhl-Verville CA-3 Airster (also known as the J4 Airster, after its engine), was a utility aircraft built in the United States in 1926, notable as the first aircraft to receive a type certificate in the United States, (A.T.C. No. 1) issued by the Aeronautics Branch of the United States Department of Commerce on March 29, 1927. It was a conventional single-bay biplane with equal-span unstaggered wings and accommodation for the pilot and passengers in tandem open cockpits. Marketed for a variety of roles including crop-dusting, aerial photography, and freight carriage, only a handful were built, some with water-cooled engines as the CW-3, and others with air-cooled engines as the CA-3.

One CA-3, piloted by Louis Meister, placed second in the 1926 Ford National Reliability Air Tour. Another, designated the CA-3A placed third in the 1927 Air Derby, piloted by Nick Mamer.

The United States Army evaluated one CW-3 and one CA-3 as trainers, but purchased neither of them.

== Versions ==
=== CA ===
- CA-3 Airster, a.k.a. J4 Airster or B-V Airster (1926)
  - 225 hp (168 kW) Wright J-4 (a.k.a. J-4 Whirlwind)
  - folding wings
  - awarded the first ATC ever issued, March 29, 1927 (ATC 1, 2-6)
  - one modified under ATC 2-6 as 2p with 220 hp (164 kW) Wright J-5 as a trainer for U.S. Army trials
- CA-3A Airster (1926)
  - 225 hp (168 kW) Wright J-5
  - 3 built
  - cost: $9,300
- CA-3B Airster (1926)
  - one built

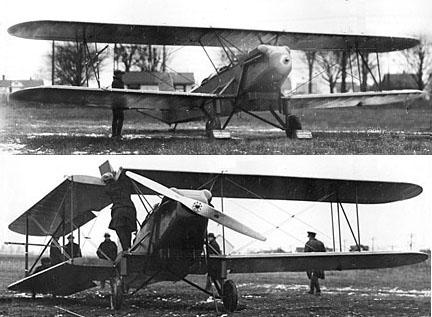
The CW-3 OX5 Airster (1925) with folding wings

=== CW ===
- CW-3 OX5 Airster (1925)
  - 90 hp (67 kW) Curtiss OX-5
  - useful load: 770 lb (349 kg)
  - range: 475 miles (764 km; 413 nmi)
  - folding wings
  - three built
- CW-3 Wright Trainer (1926)
  - 220 hp (164 kW) Wright J-5
  - useful load: 885 lb (401 kg)
  - range: 450 miles (724 km; 391 nmi)
  - one built for unsuccessful U.S. Army trainer trials

== Specifications (CA-3A) ==
Data from Jane's all the World's Aircraft 1928

General characteristics

- Crew: 1
- Capacity: 2 pax, max useful load 885 lb (401 kg)
- Length: 24 ft 7.5 in (7.506 m)
- Wingspan: 35 ft 8 in (10.87 m)
- Height: 8 ft 10 in (2.69 m)
- Wing area: 303 sq ft (28.1 m^{2})
- Empty weight: 1,550 lb (703 kg)
- Gross weight: 2,995 lb (1,359 kg)
- Fuel capacity: 40 US gal (33.3 imp gal; 151.4 L) fuselage main tank and 22 US gal (18.3 imp gal; 83.3 L) centre-section gravity tank
- Powerplant: 1 × Wright J-5 Whirlwind 9-cylinder air-cooled radial piston engine, 225 hp (168 kW)
- Propellers: 2-bladed wooden fixed-pitch propeller

Performance

- Maximum speed: 125 mph (201 km/h, 109 kn)
- Range: 475 mi (764 km, 413 nmi)
- Service ceiling: 16,000 ft (4,900 m)
- Rate of climb: 950 ft/min (4.8 m/s)
- Time to altitude: 7,250 ft (2,210 m) in 10 minutes

== See also ==
Aircraft of comparable role, configuration, and era

- Alexander Eaglerock
- American Eagle A-101
- Brunner-Winkle Bird
- Command-Aire 3C3
- Parks P-1
- Pitcairn Mailwing
- Spartan C3
- Stearman C2 and C3
- Swallow New Swallow
- Travel Air 2000 and 4000
- Waco 10

Related lists

- List of aircraft
- List of civil aircraft
