= Stearman XBT-17 =

1940s American prototype trainer aircraft

XBT-17
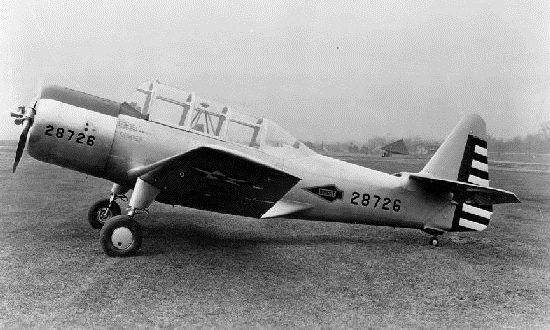

General information
- Type: Training monoplane
- National origin: United States
- Manufacturer: Stearman Aircraft
- Number built: 1

History
- First flight: 1940

The Stearman XBT-17 was a prototype 1940s American two-seat low-wing monoplane primary trainer designed and built by Stearman Aircraft (as the Model X-90). It was evaluated by the United States Army Air Force in 1942 as the XBT-17.

== Design and development ==
The X-90 was a low-wing cantilever monoplane with two-seats in tandem under an enclosed canopy. It had a fixed conventional landing gear and was powered by a 225 hp (168 kW) Lycoming R-680 engine and first flew in 1940. It had wooden wings and a steel tube forward fuselage in order to minimize use of aluminum. In 1942 the aircraft was re-engined with a 450 hp (336 kW) Pratt & Whitney R-985 engine and redesignated the Model X-91. The X-91 was evaluated by the United States Army Air Force as the XBT-17 but no more were built.

According to Edward H. Phillips, "At that time, worries at the War Department about a shortage of strategic materials such as aluminum alloy were rampant. The wood/metal composite construction of the proposed monoplane, which required more raw materials than the biplane trainers on an aircraft-by-aircraft basis, was a major factor in the Air Corps' decision not to place the XBT-17 into production, according to a Boeing technical report."

== Variants ==
Stearman X-90
Prototype basic trainer with a 225 hp (168 kW) Lycoming R-680 engine.
Stearman X-91
The X-90 re-engined with a 450 hp (336 kW) Pratt & Whitney R-985 engine for USAAF evaluation.
Stearman XBT-17
United States Army Air Force designation for the X-91.

== Specifications (XBT-17) ==
Data from

General characteristics

- Crew: two
- Length: 27 ft 9 in (8.46 m)
- Wingspan: 35 ft 9 in (10.90 m)
- Wing area: 200 sq ft (19 m^{2})
- Empty weight: 3,080 lb (1,397 kg)
- Gross weight: 4,150 lb (1,882 kg)
- Powerplant: 1 × Pratt & Whitney R-985-AN-1 , 450 hp (340 kW)

Performance

- Maximum speed: 190 mph (310 km/h, 170 kn)
- Cruise speed: 160 mph (260 km/h, 140 kn)
- Service ceiling: 20,000 ft (6,100 m)
- Rate of climb: 1,300 ft/min (6.6 m/s)

== See also ==
Related lists

- List of military aircraft of the United States
