= National Parks Airways =

- Commenced operations: 1927; 99 years ago
- Ceased operations: 1937; 89 years ago
- Operating bases: Salt Lake City
- Fleet size: See Fleet below
- Headquarters: Salt Lake City
- Key people: Alfred Frank

National Parks Airways was an airline operating in the US states of Idaho, Montana, and Utah in the 1920s and 1930s. It merged into Western Air Express (later Western Air Lines and Western Airlines) in 1937.

== History ==
Founded in 1927 by Alfred Frank, it began service with a pair of Stearman C3MB's. Air Mail was the first cargo; passengers came later.

The airline flew on a single route from Salt Lake City north to Ogden, Pocatello, Butte, and Helena, ending in Great Falls, Montana; this was air mail route awarded in 1928, CAM #26.

The awarding of the air mail route also brought NPA the ability to upgrade its fleet to Fokker Super Universals.

By 1934 service was growing enough for the airline to upgrade its fleet with the acquisition of three ex-United Air Lines Boeing 247's. This allowed National Parks to feed traffic to United's route system at Salt Lake, as there were a growing number of travelers wanting easy access to Yellowstone National Park. This prompted an extension of the route structure to Idaho Falls, Idaho and West Yellowstone, Montana.

By 1937 National Parks Airways attracted the attention of the majors seeking to expand their route structures. Western Airlines saw NPA as a fit to their route structure in the western United States. In 1937 Western acquired National Parks Airways, and the saga of the little airline in eastern Idaho came to an end.

== Accidents and incidents ==
On September 4, 1928, National Parks Airways suffered its only major accident. The southbound flight from Great Falls to Salt Lake crashed at Pocatello, with the loss of all 7 passengers and crew aboard.

== Fleet ==
- 3 Boeing 247D (NC13337, NC13339, NC13354)
- 1 Boeing 80
- 3 Fokker Super Universal (C6769, C7048, NC330M, NC7242)
- 2 Stearman C3B (C4686)

== See also ==
- List of defunct airlines of the United States
