= Swallow New Swallow =

American-built general purpose biplane of the mid- to late 1920s

Swallow Airplane Swallow

General information
- Type: General purpose biplane
- National origin: United States
- Manufacturer: Swallow Airplane Manufacturing Co.
- Designer: Lloyd and Waverly Stearman and Walter Beech

History
- Manufactured: 1924–26
- Introduction date: 1924
- First flight: 1924
- Developed from: Laird Swallow

The Swallow New Swallow, also known as the Swallow Commercial Three-Seater is an American-built general purpose biplane of the mid- to late 1920s. The New Swallow name was to distinguish it from the aircraft from which it was derived, the Laird Swallow. (Note: The designation OX-5 Swallow is sometimes used interchangeably to refer to OX-5-powered Super Swallow aircraft; sometimes even within the same reference. Similarly, Whirlwind Swallow might refer to a J-4-powered New Swallow or J-5-powered Super Swallow.)

== Development ==
The Swallow Airplane Manufacturing Co was formed in 1923 to take over the business of the E.M. Laird Aviation Co. of Wichita, Kansas and set up its factory there. In 1924, the New Swallow three-seat biplane was introduced, which differed from the earlier Laird-Swallow in having a cowled engine, split axle undercarriage and single-bay wings. About 50 examples were produced until the design was enhanced in 1926. The initial price was $3,500 reducing to $2,485 in late 1926.

After 1926, production shifted to the redesigned, steel-framed Super Swallow.

== Operational history ==
The three-seat Swallow found ready use in the hands of small commercial firms and with the newly founded regional airlines.

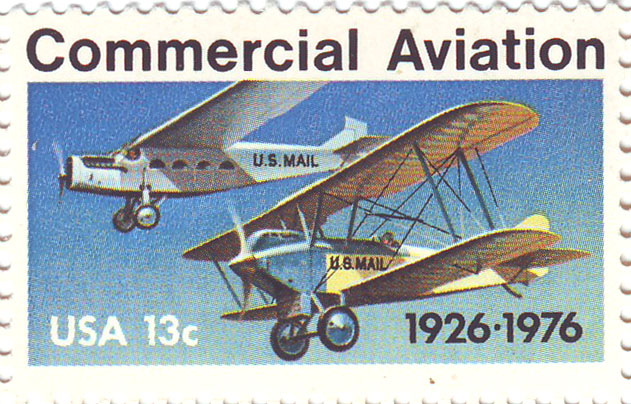
1976 postage stamp commemorating 50 years of commercial aviation in the United States. The lower aircraft is a Swallow Mailplane with its original Curtiss inline engine, in the livery of Varney Air Lines

When the Air Mail Act of 1925 came into force, Walter Varney tendered for route CAM 5, which connected Pasco, Washington with Elko, Nevada via Boise, Idaho, crossing the Cascade Mountains. He won the tender unopposed, and ordered six New Swallows to service the route. These aircraft, sometimes known as the Swallow Mailplane differed from the current production version by being equipped with a 160-hp (119-kW) Curtiss C-6 water-cooled, inline engine. Their wingspan was extended by four feet (1.2 metres) and the passenger cockpit was enclosed to create a hold for mail. The first flight took off from Pasco on April 6, 1926. Pilot Leon Cuddeback transported 9,285 pieces of mail, weighing 207 pounds (93.9 kg), plus bottles of grape juice intended for President Calvin Coolidge. Cuddeback also completed the return trip successfully, but the following week, on the second flight out of Pasco, was forced down in the desert. The Curtiss engines proved unsuitable for the hot-and-high conditions, and Varney ordered replacement air-cooled 208-hp (155-kW) Wright J-4s instead. After 60 days grounded, the re-engined Swallows returned to service.

Three Swallows participated in the 1925 Ford Air Tour, piloted by Earl Roland, John Stauffer, and Jacob Moellendick.

== Variants ==
Source : Aerofiles

New Swallow
90 h.p. Curtiss OX-5, about 50 built 1924-1926
Swallow Mailplane
also known as the J4 Swallow; six New Swallows ordered for Varney Air Lines with Curtiss C-6 engines, re-engined with Wright J-4s
Super Rhone Swallow
name given to aircraft equipped with the Super Rhone radial engine

== Specifications (New Swallow) ==
Data from Juptner 1966, p.68

General characteristics

- Crew: 1
- Capacity: 2 passengers
- Length: 23 ft 10 in (7.26 m)
- Wingspan: 32 ft 8 in (9.96 m)
- Height: 8 ft 11 in (2.72 m)
- Wing area: 300 sq ft (28 m^{2})
- Empty weight: 1,447 lb (656 kg)
- Powerplant: 1 × Curtiss OX-5 piston, 90 hp (67 kW)

Performance

- Maximum speed: 100 mph (160 km/h, 87 kn)
- Cruise speed: 85 mph (137 km/h, 74 kn)
- Range: 450 mi (720 km, 390 nmi)
- Rate of climb: 500 ft/min (2.5 m/s)

== See also ==
=== Aircraft of comparable role, configuration and era ===
(partial listing, only covers most numerous types)

- Alexander Eaglerock
- American Eagle A-101
- Brunner-Winkle Bird
- Buhl-Verville CA-3 Airster
- Command-Aire 3C3
- Parks P-1
- Pitcairn Mailwing
- Spartan C3
- Stearman C2 and C3
- Travel Air 2000 and 4000
- Waco 10

=== Related lists ===
- List of aircraft
- List of civil aircraft
