= Stearman Aircraft =

American manufacturing company

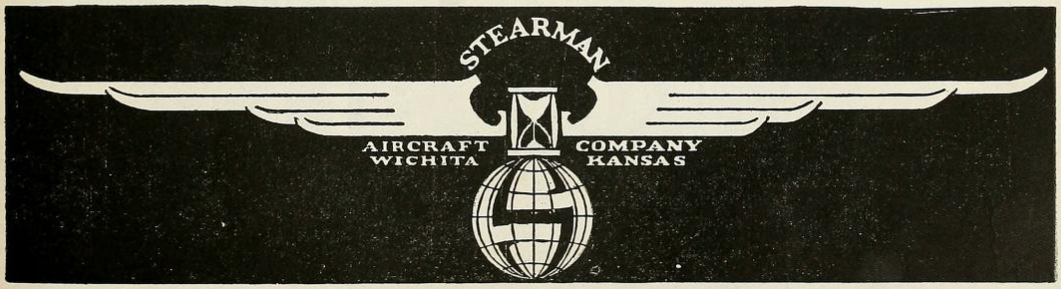

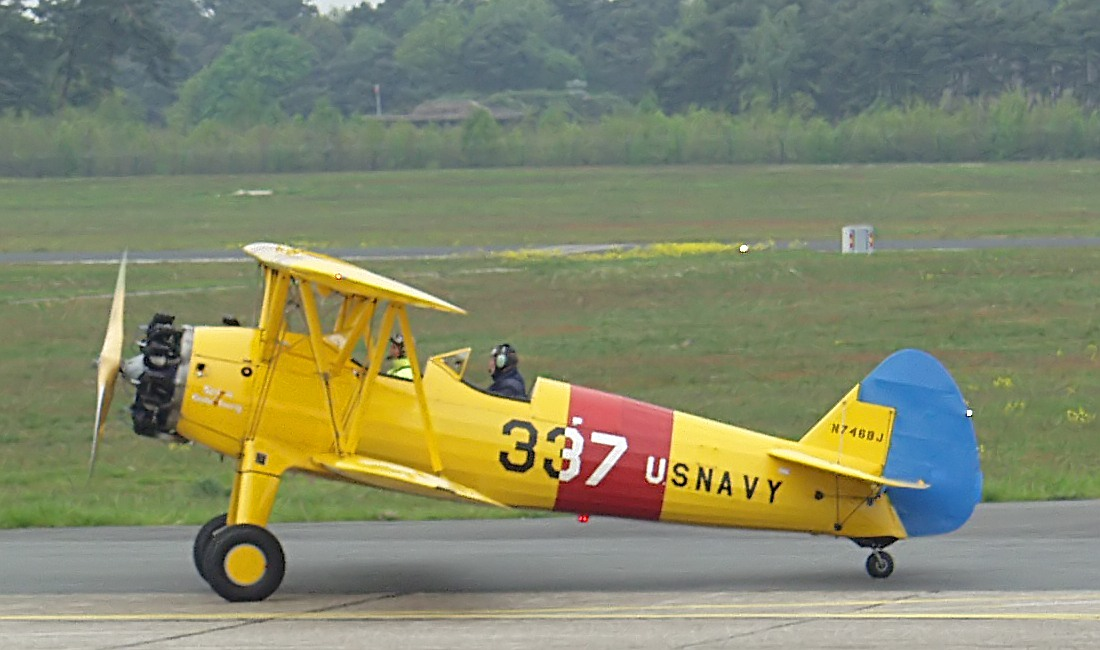
- Boeing Stearman PT-17
- Industry: Aerospace
- Founded: 1927
- Founder: Lloyd Stearman
- Fate: Bought by United Aircraft and Transport Corporation
- Parent: United Aircraft and Transport Corporation (1929–1934); Boeing (1934–2005, 2025-)

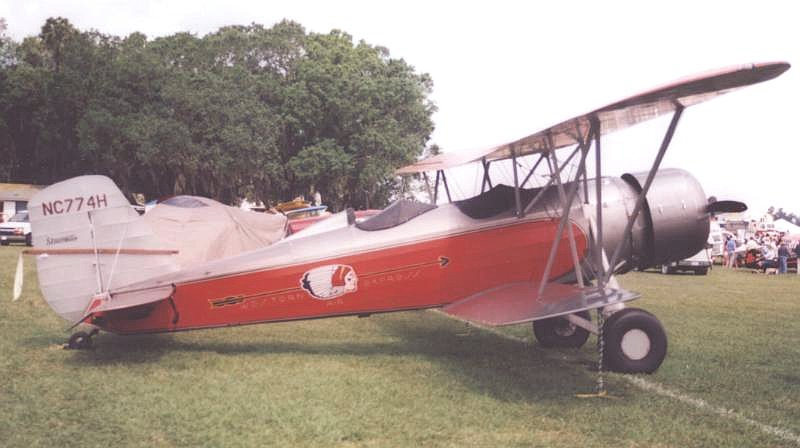
Stearman 4-D mailplane of 1931 in markings of Western Air Express

Boeing/Stearman N2S Kaydet at NAS Corpus Christi

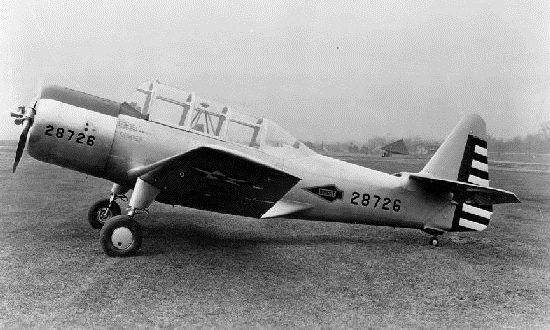
Stearman XBT-17

Stearman Aircraft Corporation was an aircraft manufacturer in Wichita, Kansas. Although the company designed a range of other aircraft, it is most known for producing the Model 75, which is commonly known simply as the "Stearman" or "Boeing Stearman".

== History ==
On 10 December 1926, Lloyd Stearman as president, Fred Hoyt as vice president, and George Lyle as secretary, chartered Stearman Aircraft, Inc. Aircraft fabrication took place in Venice, California, with final assembly and test flights taking place at Clover Field.

Four C1 and C2 biplanes were built before production moved back to Wichita in 1927. On 1 October the company was renamed the Stearman Aircraft Company, after additional capital was raised by Walter P. Innes, Jr., and his business associates. The first aircraft constructed in the Wichita factory was a C2B, while adjacent to the factory was a 1390 foot runway. The C2M with mail pit, and a new model, the Stearman C3 followed. On 11 December, Stearman was named president, Mac Short vice president, Walter P. Innes, Jr., secretary, and Harry A. Dillon treasurer. On 6 September 1927, the company charter was filed with the State of Kansas, and primary shareholders included Stearman, Short, Dillon, and Innes, plus H.M. Steinbuschel and J.O. Davidson, with Davidson also serving on the board of directors.

In June 1928, the C2B airframe designation was changed to C3B, with a larger baggage compartment and oil tank. The factory was producing 2.5 aircraft a week to meet demand. In January 1929, the first M-2 was delivered to Varney Air Lines.

In 1927, Stearman built one aircraft in Wichita, followed by 130 in 1928. At peak production in 1929, the company employed 250 people, and used a network of 10 distributors throughout the country. In late 1930, the company relocated to new facilities at the Wichita Municipal Airport.

In July 1929, Lloyd Stearman, Walter Innes, Jr., and Harry Dillon met with the officials of United Aircraft and Transport Corporation, and agreed on a stock exchange, 375 shares of Stearman stock for 100 shares of United Aircraft and Transport. Stearman's board of directors was reorganized with Frederick Rentschler as chairman, with William Boeing, Lloyd Stearman, Mac Short, Walter Innes, Jr., Julies Schaefer, and Harry Dillon as members.

In December 1930, Innes took over the presidency of the company, and Lloyd Stearman was asked by Renstchler to focus on research, "...investigating and developing new models and new ideas on management, production, sales, and service, as well as aircraft design." However, in July 1931, Stearman resigned.

The Northrop Aircraft Corporation was merged into Stearman in July 1931, (Note: The former is legally distinct entity from the later companies of the same name.) and Northrop's operations were moved from Burbank to Wichita.

By 1932, during the Great Depression, the number of employees at Stearman had dropped to 25. The situation improved when Boeing contracted Stearman to build several parts associated with the Boeing 247. In 1933, the company was also able to build the Model 80 and 81.

In September 1933, Julius Schaefer was elected president, Mac Short vice president and chief engineer, Clif Barron secretary, and D.L. Brown chairman of the board. The company also developed new training biplanes, the Model 70 and Model 73. The U.S. navy ordered 41 of the Model 73, and designated it the NS-1.

As a consequence of the Air Mail Act of 1934, United Aircraft and Transport Corporation was reorganized into the United Airlines Transport Corporation, United Aircraft, and Boeing Aircraft Company. Stearman became a division of Boeing. In November, Schaefer was elected president, Mac Short vice president, Clif Barron secretary and treasurer. By the summer of 1935, Stearman employed 200.

In July 1935, Stearman demonstrated the Model X75, a refined Model 73, and subsequently received an order for 26 aircraft from the Army Air Corps, designated the PT-13A, and 20 for the Navy. In August 1936, the Army ordered another 50 PT-13As, followed by an additional 30 in October, and 28 in December. The company now employed 400. By the summer of 1937, the company employed about 500, and produced 15 aircraft a month.

In 1937, the company developed the Model X85 for the navy. First flown in May 1938, the navy took delivery as the XOSS-1 in June 1939.

In the autumn of 1939, the company employed 600, which increased to 1000 after the Army Air Corps ordered an additional 235 PT-13Bs in September. By September 1940, the workforce totaled 1400 after receiving additional orders from the Army and Navy for hundreds more trainers. The company was then producing five aircraft per day. By October 1940, the workforce totaled 1522, and factory space had increased from 157,000 square feet in 1939 to 205,600 square feet.

In December 1940, the company demonstrated the Model X90, its version of a monoplane trainer, to the Army and Navy. However, only one version, the XBT-17, was delivered to the Army in 1942.

In February 1941, the company employed 2800 workers, and manufacturing facilities had increased to 300,000 square feet by that summer. By June 1941, the number of workers exceeded 5000. On 15 March 1941, the company delivered the 1000th trainer to the Army, and the 1001st trainer to the Navy. On 27 August 1941, the company delivered the 2000th trainer to the Army.

Stearman operated as a Boeing division until September 1941, when it was redesignated the Wichita Division, Boeing Aircraft Company.

In April 1943, the company produced its 7000th trainer, and in July 1944, its 10,000th. A total of 10,346 primary trainers were built by the company for the U.S. military.

According to Edward H. Phillips, "From 1927 to 1962 the Stearman Aircraft Company, and later the Stearman Division and the Wichita Division, built more than 14,500 aircraft. According to Boeing records, these included 247 original Stearman biplanes, 10,346 primary trainers (including equivalent spares), assemblies for 750 Waco CG-4 gliders, 1,769 B-29 heavy bombers (including spares), 12 single-engine, piston-powered L-15 liaison aircraft, 1,390 B-47 medium bombers, and 467 B-52 Stratofortress bombers."

In 2005, Boeing sold the civil portion of the former Stearman operations to Onex, forming Spirit AeroSystems, although it retained the military operations. Boeing re-acquired Spirit in 2025, thus essentially reversing the spinoff.

== Aircraft ==
Model name	First flight	Number built	Type
Stearman M-2 Speedmail	1929	7	Single engine biplane mail plane
Stearman C1	1927	1	Single engine commercial biplane
Stearman C2	1927	4	Single engine commercial biplane
Stearman C3	1927	179	Single engine commercial biplane
Stearman Model 4	1930	41	Single engine commercial biplane
Stearman Model 6 Cloudboy	1931	7	Single engine biplane trainer
Stearman Model 70		1	Prototype single engine biplane trainer
Stearman Model 71			
Stearman Model 73		78	
Stearman Model 75			Single engine biplane trainer
Stearman Model 76		78	Export version of the Model 75
Stearman Model 80		1	
Stearman Model 81		1	Single engine biplane floatplane trainer
Stearman Model 85	1938	1	Single engine biplane observation floatplane
Stearman X-90	1940	1	Single engine monoplane basic trainer
Stearman X-91		1	Re-engined X-90
Stearman X-100	1938	1	Twin engine monoplane attack airplane
Stearman X-120	1942	2	Twin engine monoplane trainer

== See also ==
- National Stearman Fly-In
