= Waco 10 =

American biplane

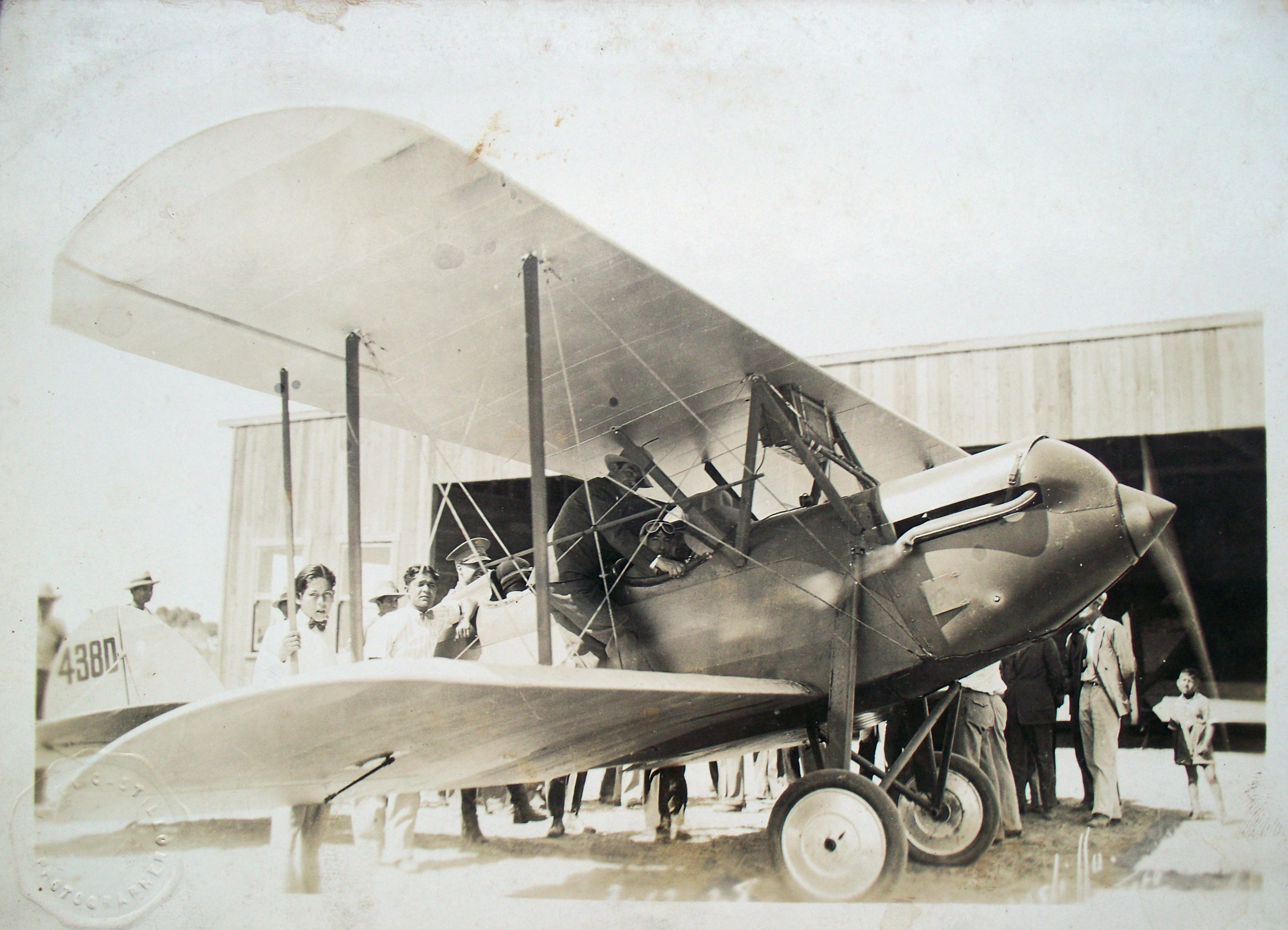
- Waco 10 giving joy rides.

General information
- Type: light passenger transport
- Manufacturer: Advance Aircraft; Waco Aircraft Company
- Designer: Charles Meyers

History
- Manufactured: 1927–1933
- Introduction date: 1927
- First flight: 1927

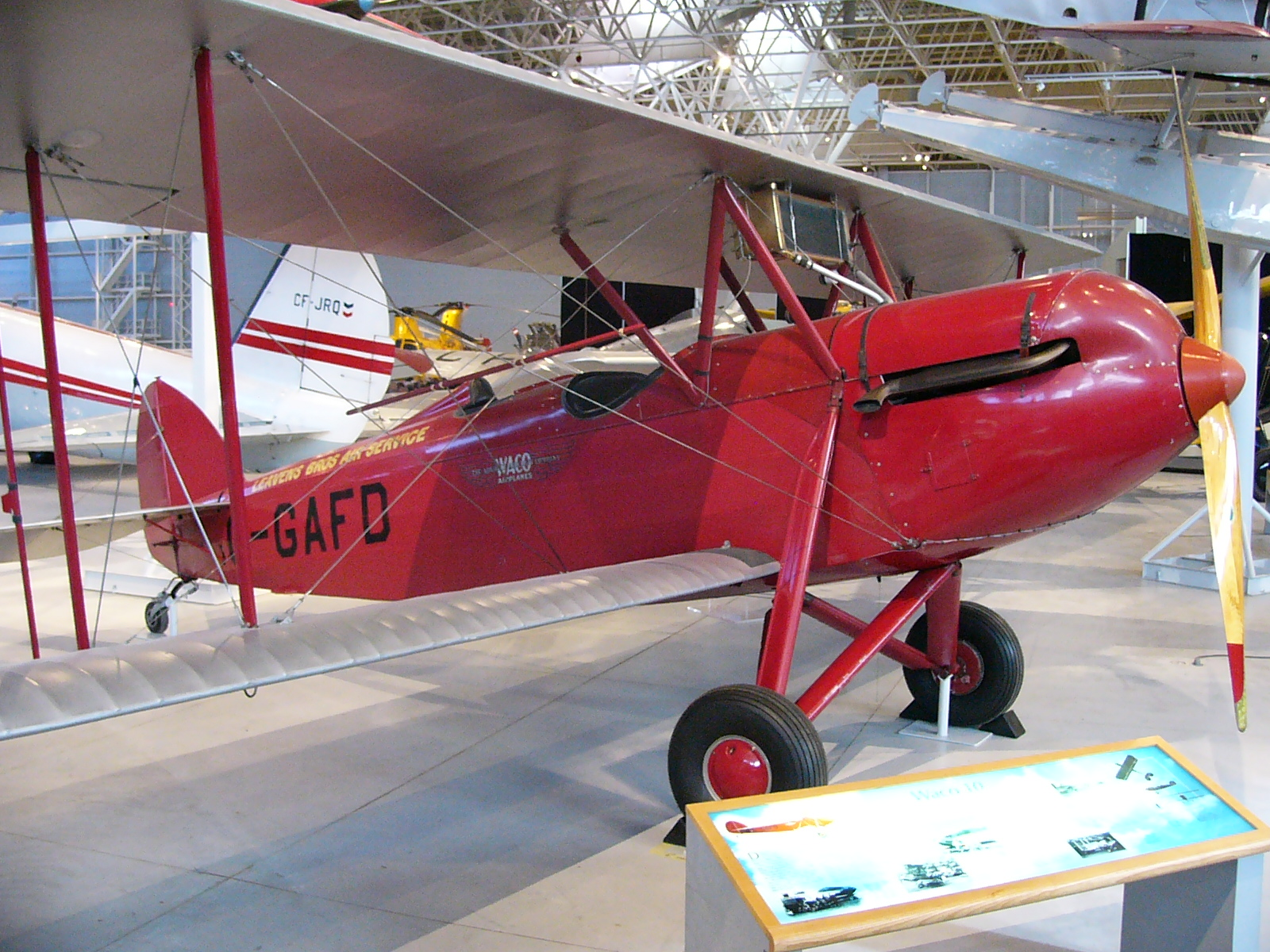
Waco 10 (or GXE) in the Canada Aviation Museum.

The Waco 10/GXE/Waco O series is a range of three-seat open-cockpit biplanes built by the Advance Aircraft Company, later the Waco Aircraft Company.

== Design and development ==
The Waco 10 was a larger span development of the Waco 9, both single-engined three-seat single-bay biplanes constructed around steel-tube frames. The wing covering was fabric, and both upper and lower planes carried ailerons, which were strut linked. The two passengers sat side by side in a cockpit under the upper wing and ahead of the pilot, who had a separate cockpit. It had a split-axle fixed undercarriage and a tailwheel. The main undercarriage was fitted with hydraulic shock absorbers, unusual at the time on a light aircraft. The fin could be trimmed on the ground to offset engine torque, and the tailplane could be trimmed in flight. Initially it was powered by a Curtiss OX-5 water-cooled 90° V-8 engine producing 90 hp (67 kW).

Its first flight was in 1927. It was numerically the most important type to be built by Waco, with at least 1,623 built over a period of 7 years from 1927 to 1933 and was fitted with a very large variety of engines of radial and V configuration.

== Operational history ==
The Waco 10 turned out to have excellent handling, and there was a ready supply of war-surplus Curtiss engines. It was widely used for the popularisation of aeronautics through barnstorming and joyrides, and was also much used as a trainer and by small operators for charter flights.

== Variants ==
In 1928, after the Waco 10 had entered production, Waco changed its designation system so that the basic model 10, powered by a 90 hp (67 kW) Curtiss OX-5 engine became the GXE.

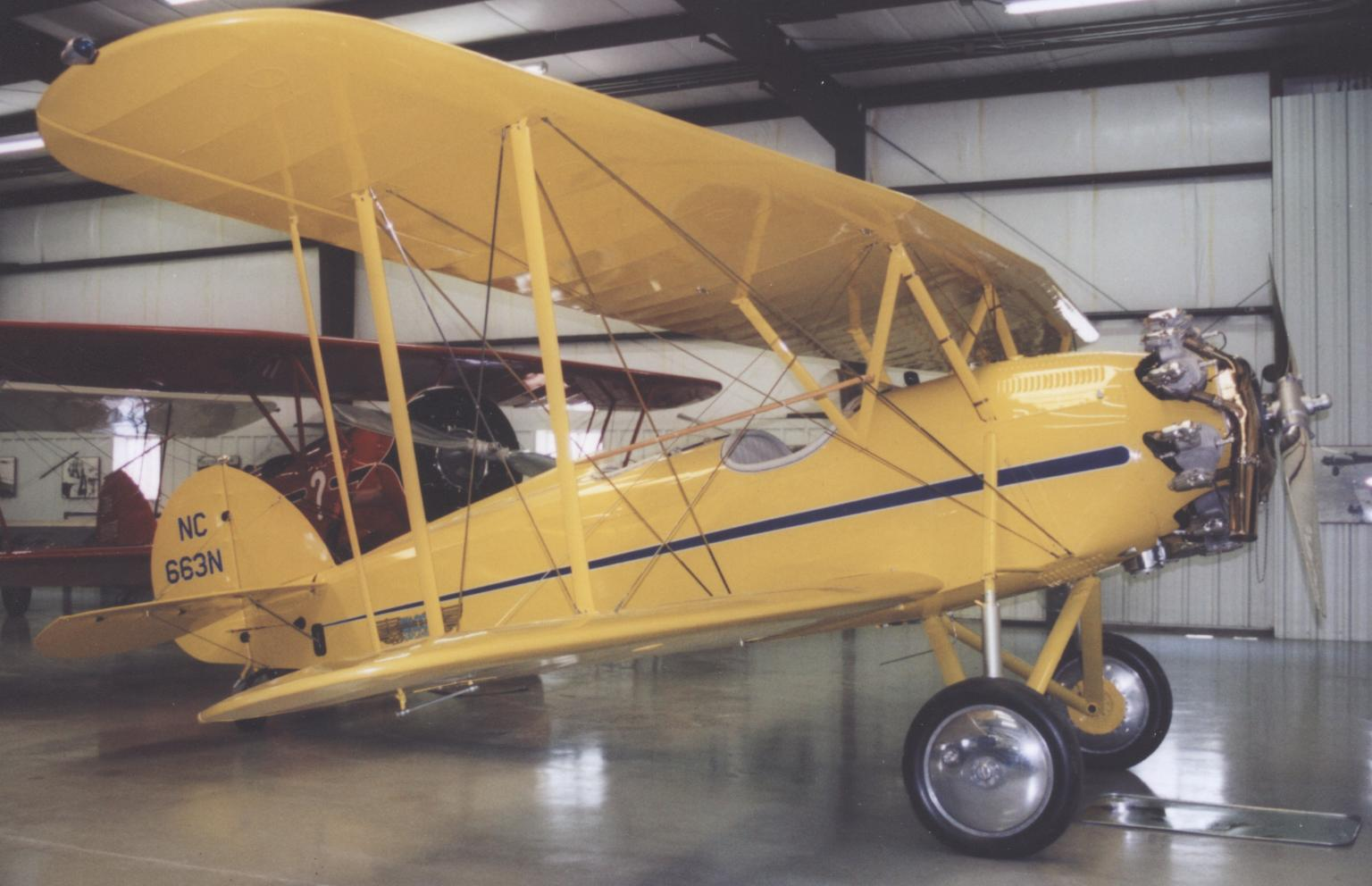
1930 Waco ATO Taperwing at the Historic Aircraft Restoration Museum near St Louis

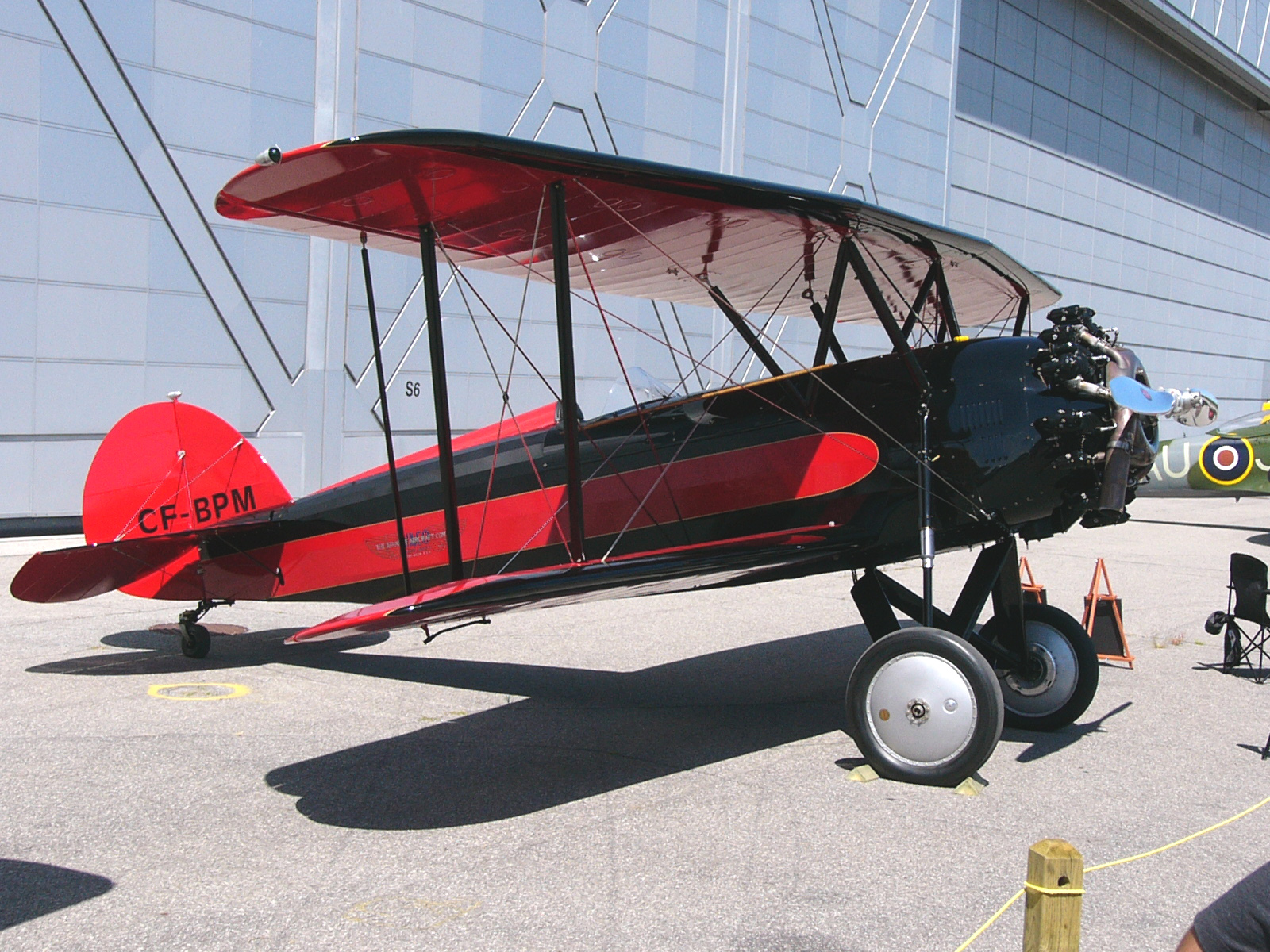
1929 Waco ATO Taperwing of Vintage Wings of Canada.

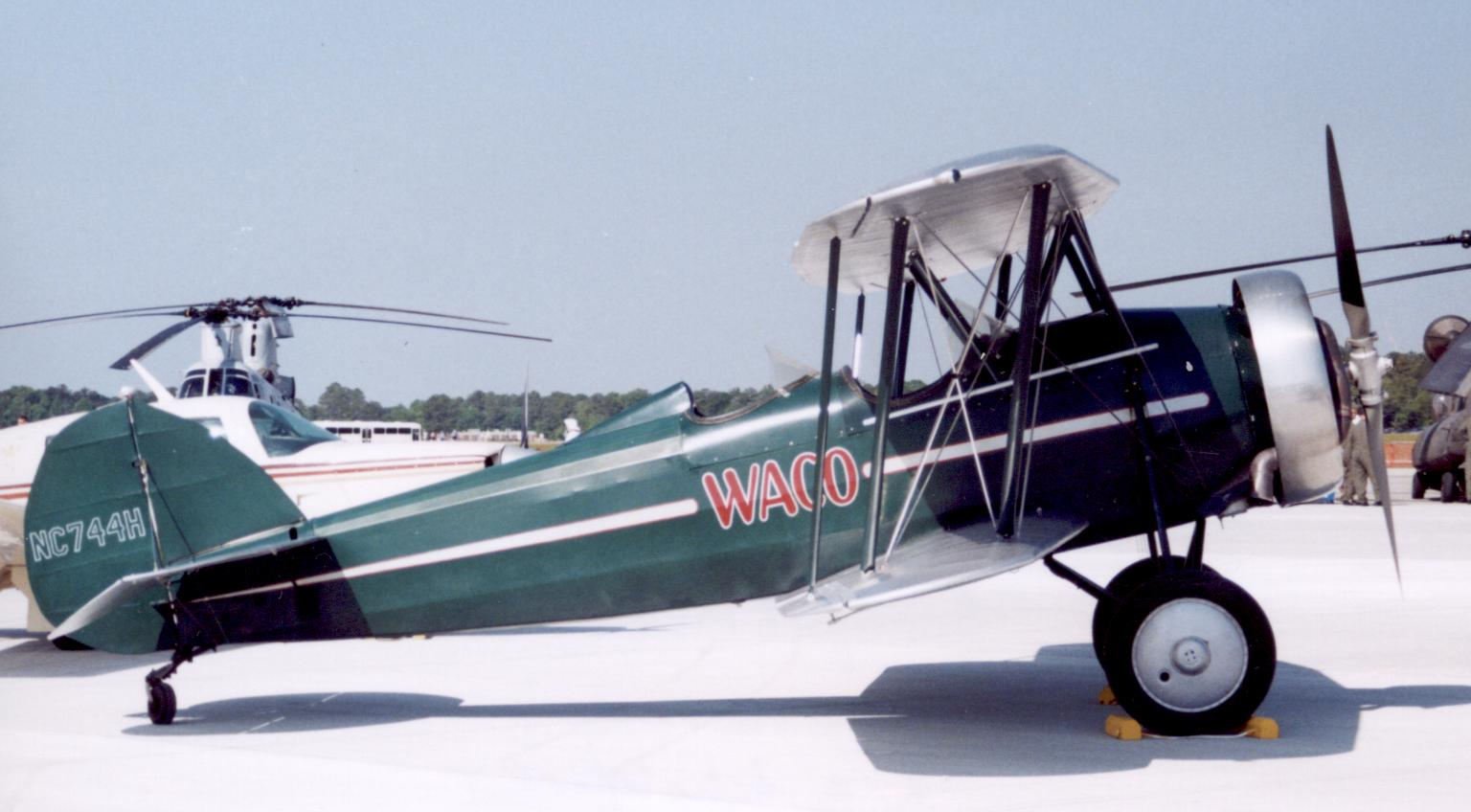
1929 Waco CTO at Marine Corps Air Station Beaufort South Carolina

Later aircraft used three-letter designations, the first denoting the engine (except for the two mailplanes), the second denoting the wing installed, S or T meaning Straight or Tapered wing, and the final O indicating it was a derivative of the 10. An -A suffix indicated an armed variant intended for export.

Early Designation	Post-1928 Designation	Marketing Designation	Engine	Power
10	GXE	90	Curtiss OX-5	90 hp (67 kW)
10-W	ASO	220-T	Wright J-5	220 hp (160 kW)
10-T	ATO		Wright J-5	220 hp (160 kW)
	BSO/BSO-A	BS-165	Wright J-6-5	165 hp (123 kW)
	CSO	C-225	Wright J-6-7	225 hp (168 kW)
	CTO		Wright J-6-7	225 hp (168 kW)
10-H	DSO		Hispano-Suiza 8A or E	150–180 hp (110–130 kW)
	HSO		Packard DR-980 Diesel	225 hp (168 kW)
	HTO		Packard DR-980 Diesel	225 hp (168 kW)
	JTO		Wright J-6-9	300 hp (220 kW)
	JYM	Mailplane	Wright J-6-9	300 hp (220 kW)
	JWM	Mailplane	Wright J-6-9	330 hp (250 kW)
	KSO		Kinner K-5	100 hp (75 kW)
	OSO		Kinner C-5	210 hp (160 kW)
	PSO		Jacobs radials	140–170 hp (100–130 kW)
	QSO		Continental A70	165 hp (123 kW)
	RSO		Warner Scarab	110 hp (82 kW)
		240-A	Continental W-670	240 hp (180 kW)
		300-A	300 hp radial	300 hp (220 kW)

Apart from the water-cooled V-8 Curtiss and Hispano-Suiza engines, all of the rest were air-cooled radials.

Other engines were fitted experimentally, without unique designations, including the Rausie, Ryan-Siemens, and 115 hp (86 kW) Milwaukee Tank engine. This last engine was an air-cooled version of the Curtiss OX-5, and was intended as an aircraft engine.

The JYM and JWM were mailplane derivatives with a 14" fuselage stretch.

In the 1990s the unrelated The WACO Aircraft Company in Forks, Washington offered a homebuilt kit version of the ATO model.

The WACO 240-A was a straight-wing fighter, built for export, powered by 240 hp (180 kW) Wright engine. At least six were bought by the Cantonese Chinese aviation services. They were armed with twin .30 Browning machine guns and had racks for five 25 lb (11 kg) or two 100 lb (45 kg) bombs.

There was also an export model WACO Pursuit 300T-A, with 300 hp (220 kW) Wright or Wasp Jr engine.

=== Military designations ===
D1W
Brazilian Navy designation for the CSO.

== Surviving aircraft ==
Year	Model	Serial #	Registration	Location	References
1927	GXE	781	N312DC	Gatlinburg–Pigeon Forge Airport, Tennessee	
1928	GXE	1388	N6675K	Historic Aircraft Restoration Museum, Maryland Heights, Missouri	
1928	GXE	1464	NC4899	Ohio History Connection	
1928	GXE	1521	C-GAFD	Canada Aviation and Space Museum, Ottawa, Ontario	
1928	GXE	1554	NC6974	Eagles Mere Air Museum at Eagles Mere, Pennsylvania	
1928	GXE	1586	NC5852	privately owned and based at Covington, Ohio	
1928	GXE	1644/3065	CF-AOI	Reynolds-Alberta Museum, Wetaskiwin, Alberta	
1928	GXE	1810	N6513	Western Antique Aeroplane & Automobile Museum	
1928	ASO	A-10	NC7091	Embry-Riddle Aeronautical University, Daytona Beach, Florida	
1928	ATO	A-4	NC5814	EAA AirVenture Museum, Oshkosh, Wisconsin	
1928	ATO	A-20	N6714	Western Antique Aeroplane & Automobile Museum	
1929	ATO	A-65	CF-BPM	Reynolds-Alberta Museum, Wetaskiwin, Alberta, previously owned by Vintage Wings of Canada, Gatineau, Québec	
1929	ATO	A-103	NC906H	Historic Aircraft Restoration Museum, Maryland Heights, Missouri	
1929	CTO	A-118	N13918	WACO Aircraft Museum, Troy, Ohio	
1929	GXE	1801	NC7970	Has Curtiss OXX-6 V8 engine at Texas Air Museum - Stinson Chapter San Antonio Texas	
1929	GXE	1869	NC8529	privately owned and based at Corning, Iowa	
1929	DSO	3006	N605N	Western Antique Aeroplane & Automobile Museum	
1929	CSO	1657	N7662	Western Antique Aeroplane & Automobile Museum	
1929	CTO	AT-3005	N516M	Western Antique Aeroplane & Automobile Museum	
1930	ATO	D-3128	NC663N	Historic Aircraft Restoration Museum, Maryland Heights, Missouri	
1930	CSO	3140	N671N	Historic Aircraft Restoration Museum, Maryland Heights, Missouri	
1932	CTO	A-3596	NC280W	Historic Aircraft Restoration Museum, Maryland Heights, Missouri	

== Specifications (Waco GXE) ==
Data from U.S. Civil Aircraft Vol. I

General characteristics

- Crew: 1
- Capacity: 2 passengers
- Length: 23 ft 6 in (7.16 m)
- Wingspan: 30 ft 7 in (9.32 m)
- Height: 9 ft 0 in (2.74 m)
- Wing area: 288 sq ft (26.8 m^{2})
- Airfoil: Aeromarine 2A
- Empty weight: 1,200 lb (544 kg)
- Gross weight: 2,025 lb (919 kg)
- Fuel capacity: 37 US gal (31 imp gal; 140 L)
- Powerplant: 1 × Curtiss OX-5 V-8 water-cooled piston engine, 90 hp (67 kW)
- Propellers: 2-bladed fixed-pitch propeller

Performance

- Maximum speed: 97 mph (156 km/h, 84 kn)
- Cruise speed: 84 mph (135 km/h, 73 kn)
- Stall speed: 37 mph (60 km/h, 32 kn) (landing speed)
- Range: 385 mi (620 km, 335 nmi)
- Endurance: 5 hr 30 min
- Service ceiling: 12,000 ft (3,700 m)
- Rate of climb: 520 ft/min (2.6 m/s)

== See also ==
=== Aircraft of comparable role, configuration and era ===
(Partial listing, only covers most numerous types)

- Alexander Eaglerock
- American Eagle A-101
- Brunner-Winkle Bird
- Buhl-Verville CA-3 Airster
- Command-Aire 3C3
- Parks P-1
- Pitcairn Mailwing
- Spartan C3
- Stearman C2 and C3
- Swallow New Swallow
- Travel Air 2000 and 4000

=== Related lists ===
- List of aircraft
- List of civil aircraft
