= Spartan NP =

US Navy two-seat primary trainer aircraft circa 1940

Spartan NP-1
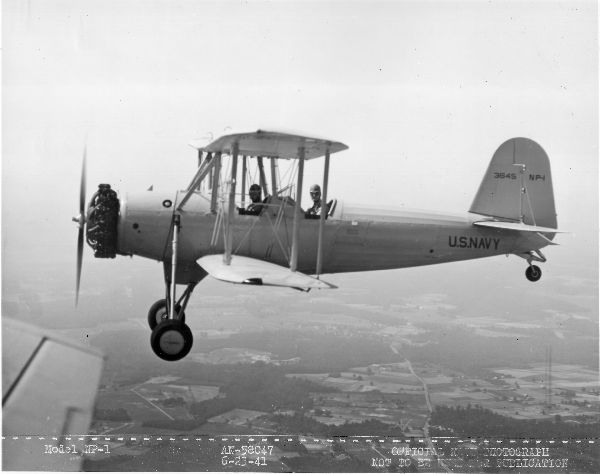

General information
- Type: Biplane trainer
- National origin: United States
- Manufacturer: Spartan Aircraft Company
- Primary user: United States Navy
- Number built: 201

History
- Developed from: Spartan C-3

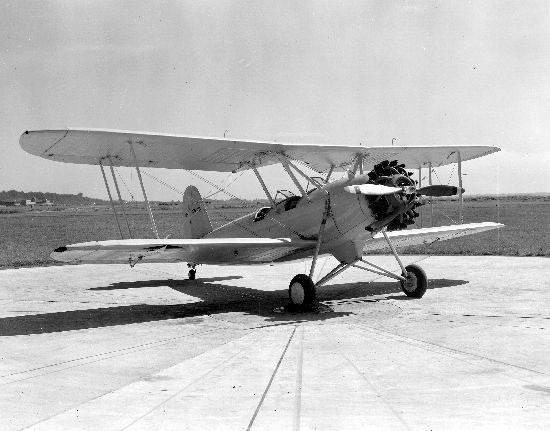
Spartan NP-1

The Spartan NP-1 was a two-seat primary trainer designed and built by the Spartan Aircraft Company for the United States Navy reserve units.

== Development ==
On 10 July 1940 the company received an order from the United States Navy for 201 aircraft for use as a biplane primary trainer, it was to be a modernised version of the companies earlier C-3. It was a conventional biplane with two-seats in tandem open cockpits. Designated by the company as the NS-1 it was given the military designation NP-1. The NP-1 was powered by a 220 hp (164 kW) Lycoming R-680-8 radial engine.

== Operators ==
United States

- United States Navy

== Specifications (NP-1) ==
Data from United States Navy Aircraft since 1911

General characteristics

- Crew: 2 (pilot, student)
- Length: 24 ft 3 in (7.39 m)
- Wingspan: 33 ft 9 in (10.29 m)
- Gross weight: 3,006 lb (1,366 kg)
- Powerplant: 1 × Lycoming R-680-8 radial engine , 220 hp (164 kW)

Performance

- Maximum speed: 108 mph (174 km/h, 94 kn)

== See also ==
Related lists

- List of United States Navy aircraft designations (pre-1962)
