= Parks P-1 =

P-1
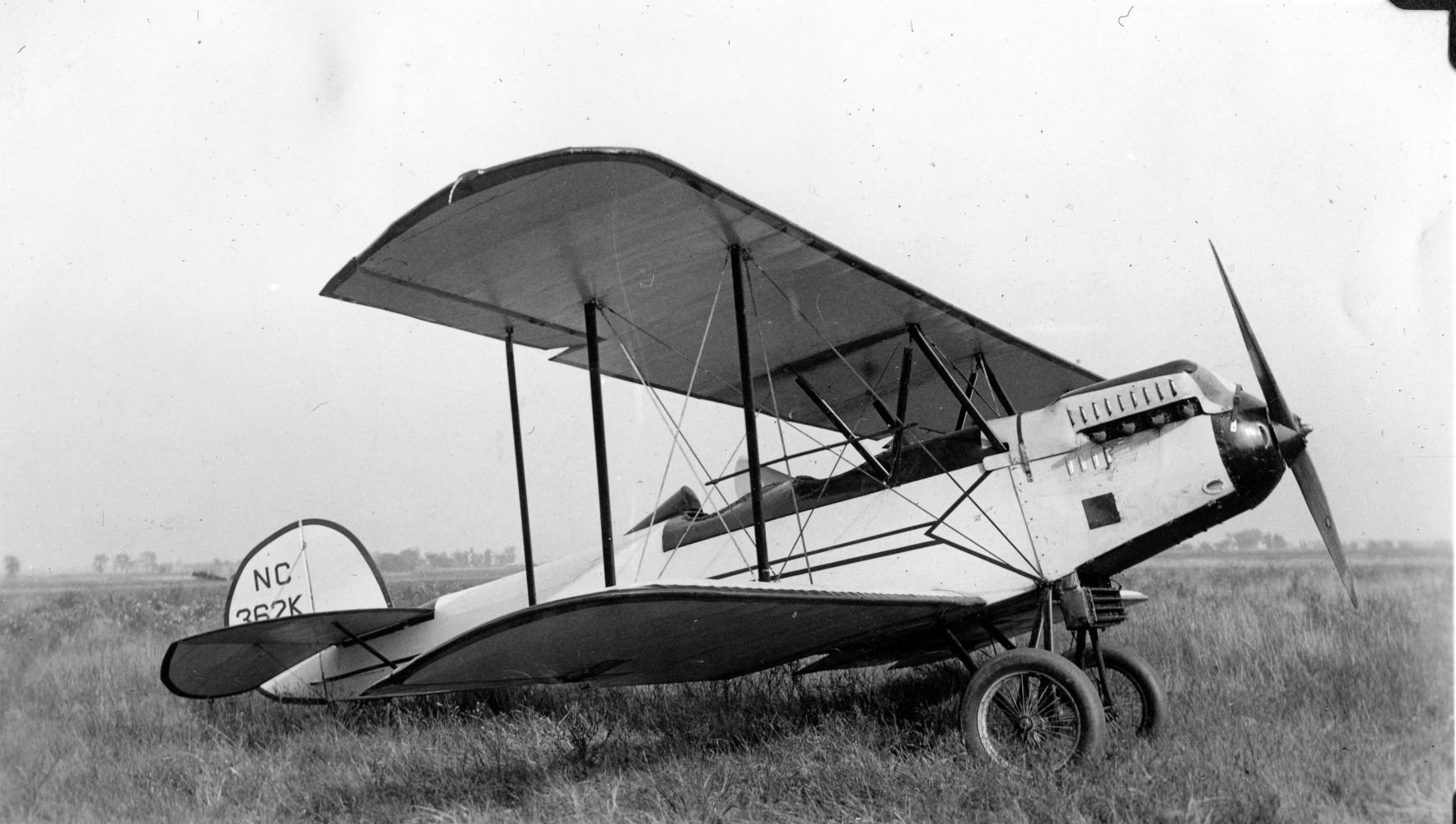

General information
- Type: Sport biplane
- National origin: United States
- Manufacturer: Parks Aircraft Division, Parks Air Lines, Parks Air College
- Number built: 45

History
- Introduction date: 1929
- Developed from: Kreider-Reisner Challenger

The Parks P-1 was an American three-seat sport biplane that was built in the late 1920s.

== Design and development ==
Based in St.Louis, pilot, salesman and entrepreneur Oliver Parks founded an air school, airline and aircraft manufacturing business shortly after Lindbergh's 1927 transatlantic flight. Parks bought the rights to the Kreider-Reisner Challenger C-2 and modified it with a chin radiator. The P-1 was built in a new facility in Cahokia, Illinois.

The P-1 was a tandem seat, open cockpit biplane with conventional landing gear. The fuselage was constructed of welded steel tubing with aircraft fabric covering.

== Operational history ==
The P-1 was both sold as a commercial aircraft and placed into service as a trainer at Parks Air College. Although the OX-5 engine was out of production since 1917, there were still enough war surplus engines available at low enough cost to justify installing them on the 1929 design. This made the P-1 the last new aircraft produced using the outdated engine. Parks located his engines by sending out his associate, Joeseph Wecker, to buy OX-5 engines from flight schools in the region. Production ended at number 45, before the onset of the Great Depression and the temporary takeover of the company by the Detroit Aircraft Corporation.

While part of the Detroit Aircraft Corporation, one experimental P-1 (X289W) was modified with a faired in, tail mounted, all-plane parachute. It was filmed in a live deployment for Paramount Sound News. The 60 ft diameter Russell parachute was designed to hold 2600 to 3000 lbs. A secondary 24 ft diameter parachute was installed for the pilot.

One P-1 has been restored and displayed at the EAA airshow at Oshkosh, Wisconsin winning the award for outstanding open cockpit aircraft in 1992.

== Variants ==
Parks P-1
45 units built, Kreider-Reisner Challenger C-2 copy but with chin radiator.
Parks P-1H
Powered by a 100hp Kinner K-5, received ATC on 23 November 1932. 7 aircraft modified as the Hammond 100 Sportster.
Parks P-1T
Powered by a 115hp Milwaukee Tank engine.
Parks P-1X
Three-seater with a 90hp Curtiss OX-5 engine.

== Specifications (Parks P-1) ==
Data from Specifications of American Commercial Airplanes

General characteristics

- Crew: 1
- Capacity: 2 passengers
- Length: 24 ft 7 in (7.49 m)
- Wingspan: 29 ft 8 in (9.04 m)
- Height: 9 ft 4 in (2.84 m)
- Wing area: 290 sq ft (27 m^{2})
- Empty weight: 1,311 lb (595 kg)
- Gross weight: 2,078 lb (943 kg)
- Fuel capacity: 35 US gal (29 imp gal; 130 L)
- Powerplant: 1 × Curtiss OX-5 water-cooled V8 engine, 90 hp (67 kW)

Performance

- Maximum speed: 102 mph (164 km/h, 89 kn)
- Cruise speed: 90 mph (140 km/h, 78 kn)
- Range: 305 mi (491 km, 265 nmi)
- Service ceiling: 11,000 ft (3,400 m)
- Rate of climb: 500 ft/min (2.5 m/s)

== See also ==
Aircraft of comparable role, configuration, and era

- Alexander Eaglerock
- American Eagle A-101
- Brunner-Winkle Bird
- Buhl-Verville CA-3 Airster
- Butler Blackhawk
- Command-Aire 3C3
- Pitcairn Mailwing
- Spartan C3
- Stearman C2 and C3
- Swallow New Swallow
- Travel Air 2000 and 4000
- Waco 10

Related lists

- List of aircraft
- List of civil aircraft
