= Axelson (company) =

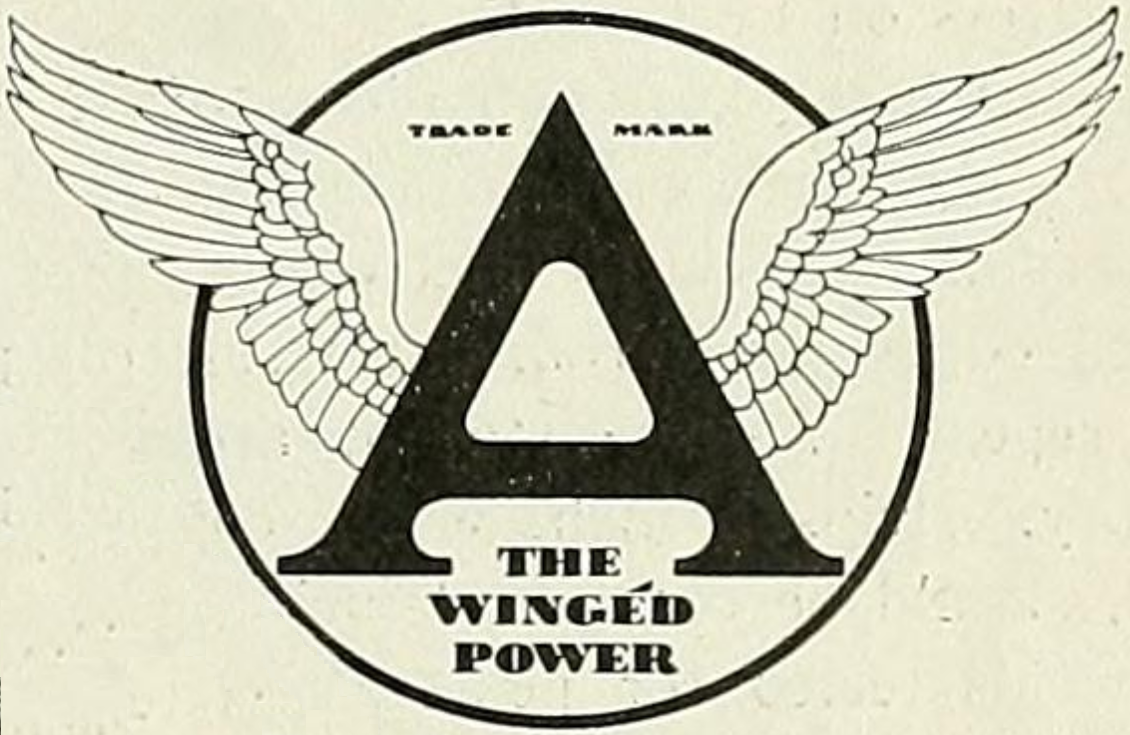
- Industry: Aerospace
- Headquarters: Los Angeles, California, United States

The Axelson Aircraft Engine Company was a manufacturer of aircraft engines based in Los Angeles in the late 1920s.

Their engines were originally known as "FLOCO", because the manufacturer was originally Frank L. Odenbreidt Co. Their products included the 115 hp Axelson A-7-R and 150 hp Axelson B. Axelson engines were used to power the Swallow F28-AX, among other contemporary aircraft.
