= Stearman C1 =

1920s American aircraft

C1
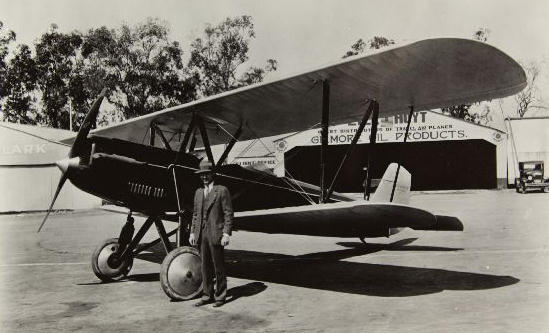

General information
- Type: 3-seat commercial biplane
- National origin: United States
- Manufacturer: Stearman Aircraft Corp.
- Number built: 1

History
- First flight: March 1927
- Developed into: Stearman C3C

The Stearman C1 (or Stearman Sport Commercial Model 1) was the first type of airplane manufactured by the Stearman Aircraft Corporation. Only one example was manufactured, at the original Stearman factory in Venice, California, flying for the first time in March 1927.

== Design and development ==
The aircraft was a sesquiwing type of biplane with its fuselage frame manufactured from thin-walled steel tubing, as were the horizontal and vertical stabilizers, the elevators and rudder. The wings had spruce spars. The aircraft had two tandem open cockpits with the pilot in the aft cockpit and two passengers in the forward cockpit. Ailerons were installed on the upper wings only. The upper wing span was 38 feet, while the lower wing span was 35 feet. Overall length was 24 feet, at a height of 9 feet. Empty weight was 1500 pounds. The landing gear had a split-axle design, with hydraulic struts and rubber bungee cords. Drum brakes were a standard installation.

First flight was in March 1927. Initially powered by a 90 hp (67 kW) Curtiss OX-5, in the summer 1927 it was replaced by a 260 hp (194 kW) French Salmson 9Z water cooled radial engine and designated the C1X.
