= American Eagle A-101 =

American Eagle A-1 & A-101
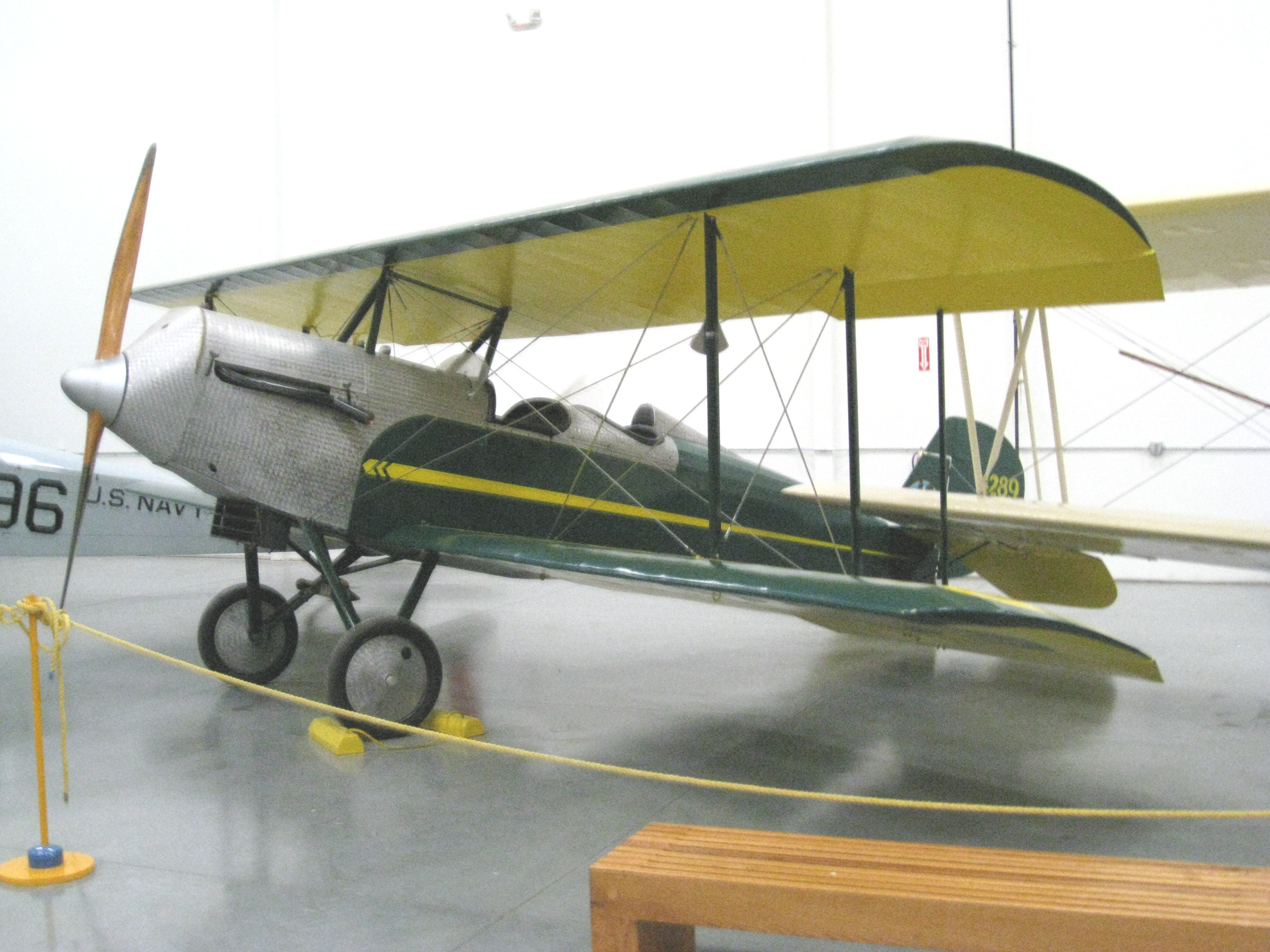
- American Eagle A-101 on display in the Yanks Air Museum at Chino, California in January 2008

General information
- Type: light sporting biplane
- National origin: United States
- Manufacturer: American Eagle Aircraft Corporation
- Designer: Robert T McCrum & Waverly Stearman
- Status: some flying in 2009
- Primary user: flying schools and private owners
- Number built: approx 300

History
- First flight: 9 April 1926

The American A-1 and A-101 were American two and three-seat biplanes of the 1920s.

== Design and development ==
The American Eagle A-1 was designed in late 1925 as a training aircraft to replace the World War I biplanes then in use by the Porterfield Flying School. The prototype A-1 first flew at Richards Field in Kansas City Missouri on 9 April 1926. Small modifications made to the design in 1927, including ailerons on the lower wings, led to the A-101 designation. The 90 h.p. Curtiss OX-5 engine was initially fitted, but the 100 h.p. Curtiss OX-6 was fitted to later production A-101s.

== Operational history ==
A total of approximately 300 A-1/A-101 aircraft had been completed by 1929. These served successfully with flying schools and private owners for many years and several survived in flying condition and displayed in museums in 2007.

== Aircraft on display ==
- Yanks Air Museum
- Reynolds Museum
- Wings of History Museum

== Specifications (A-101) ==
Data from Simpson, 2001, P.41

General characteristics

- Crew: 1
- Capacity: 1 or 2
- Length: 24 ft 1 in (7.34 m)
- Wingspan: 30 ft 0 in (9.14 m)
- Height: 8 ft 4 in (2.54 m)
- Empty weight: 1,227 lb (557 kg)
- Gross weight: 2,041 lb (926 kg)
- Powerplant: 1 × Curtiss OX-5 , 90 hp (67 kW)

Performance

- Maximum speed: 99 mph (159 km/h, 86 kn)
- Cruise speed: 85 mph (137 km/h, 74 kn)
- Range: 385 mi (620 km, 335 nmi)
- Rate of climb: 500 ft/min (2.5 m/s)

== See also ==
=== Aircraft of comparable role, configuration and era ===
(Partial listing, only covers most numerous types)

- Alexander Eaglerock
- Brunner-Winkle Bird
- Buhl-Verville CA-3 Airster
- Command-Aire 3C3
- Parks P-1
- Pitcairn Mailwing
- Spartan C3
- Stearman C2 and C3
- Swallow New Swallow
- Travel Air 2000 and 4000
- Waco 10

=== Related lists ===
- List of aircraft
- List of civil aircraft
