= Brunner-Winkle Bird =

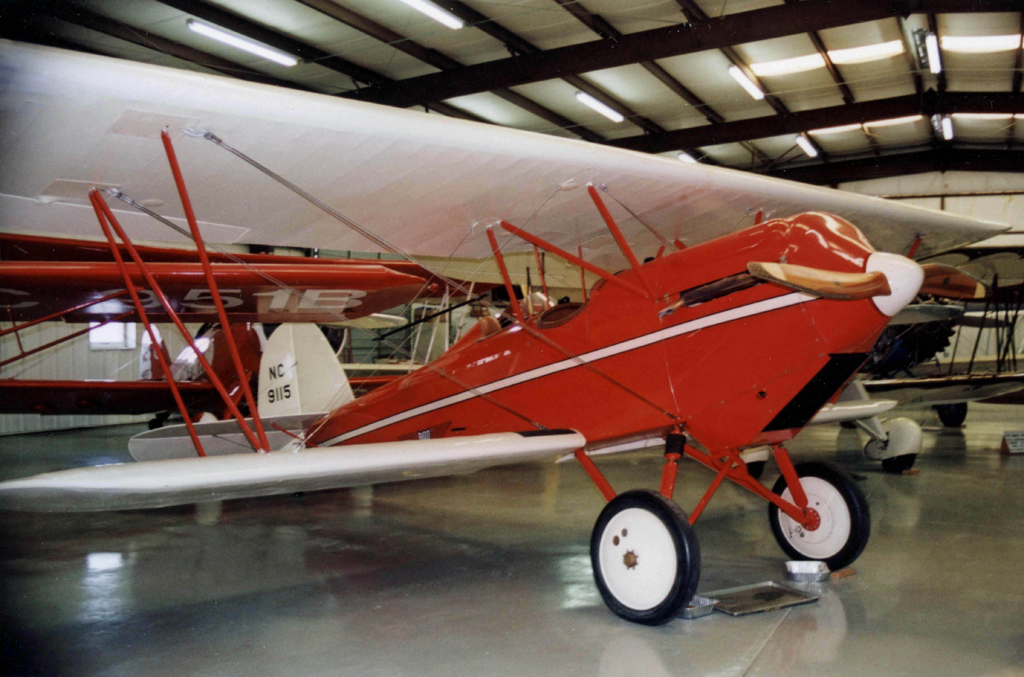
- Bird A of 1929 fitted with Curtiss OX-5 engine preserved at the Historic Aircraft Restoration Museum near St Louis, Missouri

General information
- Type: air-taxi/joyrider
- National origin: United States
- Manufacturer: Brunner-Winkle
- Status: some aircraft still flying and on display in museums
- Primary user: private flyers and barnstorming
- Number built: ca. 240

History
- First flight: September 1928

The Brunner-Winkle Bird was a three-seat taxi and joy-riding aircraft produced in the US from 1928 to 1931.

== Design and operation ==
The Model A version was powered by the ubiquitous Curtiss OX-5, and featured a welded steel-tube truss fuselage with metal and fabric skinning. The wings, constructed of Spruce and plywood were also covered with metal and fabric skinning. The Model A had a reasonable performance for an OX-5 powered aircraft. The Model A's ease of handling led to its entry into the 1929 Guggenheim Safety Airplane contest, where it was awarded the highest ratings for a standard production aircraft.

The Model A was awarded Group 2 approval no 2-33 in January 1929 for the first nine aircraft serial no. 1000 to 1008. Aircraft serial no. 1009 upwards were manufactured under Air Transport Certificate no. 101.

The Model B followed on from the initial Bird design and was fitted with the uncowled Kinner radial engine. Production aircraft were designated BK.

== Variants ==
Data from: aerofiles.com

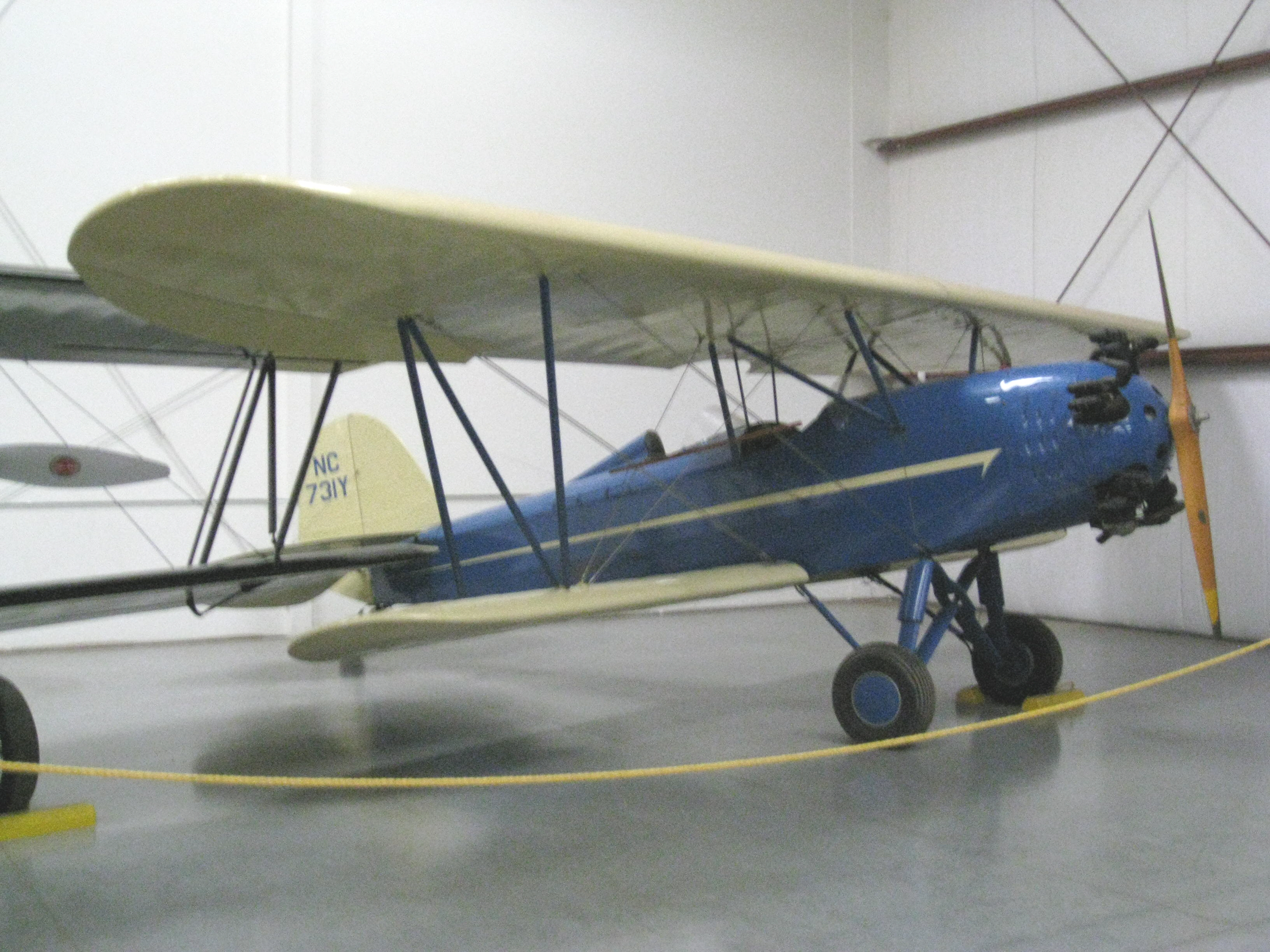
Bird BK of 1930 with Kinner K-5 engine preserved at the Yanks Air Museum at Chino, California

Model A
original production version with Curtiss OX-5 engine (ca. 80 built)
Model AT
version with Milwaukee Tank engine (2 converted from Model A)
Model B
version with Kinner K-5 engine (1 prototype)

Model BK
production version of Model B (84 built)

Model C
version with Wright J-5 engine (1 built)

Model CC
version with Curtiss R-600 Challenger engine (1 built)
Model CJ
version with Jacobs LA-1 engine (6 built)
Model CK
version with Kinner B-5 engine (50 built)
Model RK
export version of Model CK (1 built)

Model E
4-5 seat version with enclosed cabin and Kinner B-5 engine (1 built)
Model F
version with Packard DR-980 (1 built)

== Specifications (Bird Model A) ==
Data from U.S. civil aircraft series:Vol.2

General characteristics

- Crew: 1
- Capacity: 2 passengers
- Length: 22 ft 3 in (6.78 m)
- Wingspan: 34 ft 00 in (10.36 m)
- Height: 8 ft 8 in (2.64 m)
- Wing area: 266 sq ft (24.7 m^{2})
- Empty weight: 1,315 lb (596 kg)
- Gross weight: 2,150 lb (975 kg)
- Powerplant: 1 × Curtiss OX-5 V-8 water-cooled piston engine, 90 hp (67 kW)
- Propellers: 2-bladed wooden fixed-pitch propeller

Performance

- Maximum speed: 105 mph (169 km/h, 91 kn)
- Cruise speed: 88 mph (142 km/h, 76 kn)
- Range: 450 mi (720 km, 390 nmi)
- Service ceiling: 12,500 ft (3,800 m)
- Rate of climb: 520 ft/min (2.6 m/s)

== See also ==
=== Aircraft of comparable role, configuration and era ===
(Partial listing, only covers most numerous types)

- Alexander Eaglerock
- American Eagle A-101
- Buhl-Verville CA-3 Airster
- Butler Blackhawk
- Command-Aire 3C3
- Parks P-1
- Pitcairn Mailwing
- Spartan C3
- Stearman C2 and C3
- Swallow New Swallow
- Travel Air 2000 and 4000
- Waco 10

=== Related lists ===
- List of aircraft
- List of civil aircraft

== Bibliography ==
- "Yanks Air Museum".
- Photos of Brunner-Winkle Bird
