= Stearman C3 =

American Aircraft

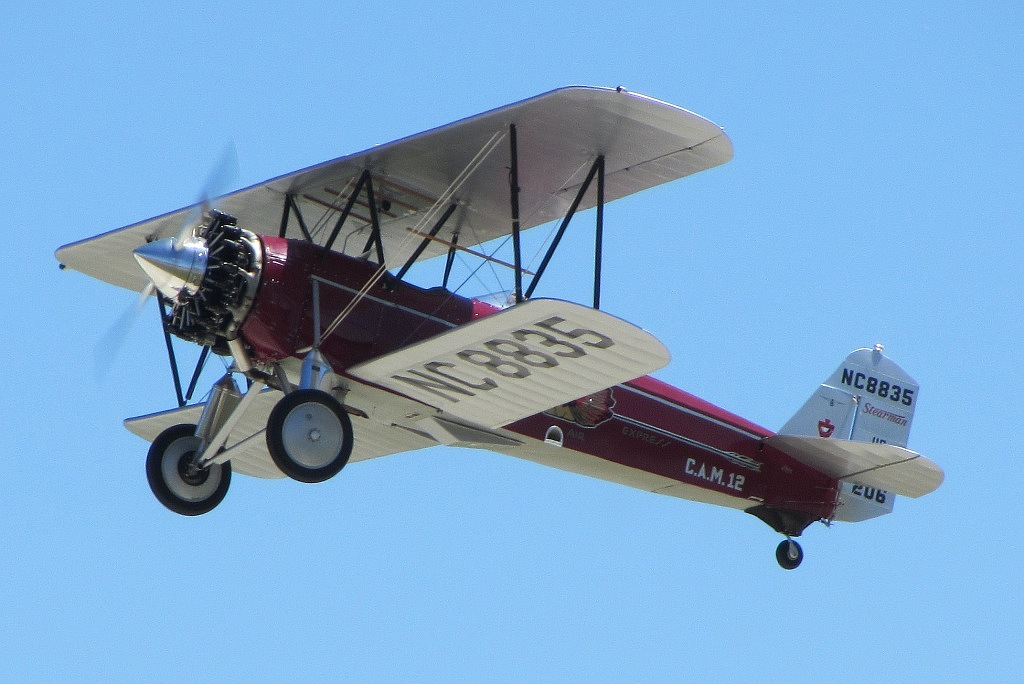
- Stearman C3B

General information
- Type: three-seat light commercial biplane
- National origin: United States
- Manufacturer: Stearman Aircraft
- Designer: Lloyd Stearman
- Status: 5
- Primary user: air mail and commercial companies
- Number built: 179

History
- First flight: 1927

The Stearman C3 was an American-built civil biplane aircraft of the 1920s, designed by Stearman Aircraft of Wichita, Kansas. It was also the first Stearman aircraft to receive a type certificate.

== Development ==
The C3 was a rugged biplane with simple straight wings, a tough undercarriage with oleo shock absorbers and two open cockpits with the pilot in the rear and two side-by-side passenger seats in the front. In fact, it was a slightly modified version of the earlier model C2 aircraft. Changes included an increased volume oil tank and larger sized baggage compartment.

Introduced in 1928, the C3 was powered by a variety of engines of between 128 hp (95 kW) and 225 hp (168 kW), each version having its own designation. The last version of the C3 was the C3R which had several external differences including a cutout in the aft portion of the wing center section for improved pilot visibility, a headrest in the aft cockpit, and slightly increased chord of the rudder and vertical stabilizer.

Although there were several versions of the C3, most were either the C3B and the C3R. A few C3s were approved for float operations.

== Operational history ==
The C3 was built with light commercial applications in mind, including passenger flying and business flights. The C3MB was a special mail-carrying aircraft based on the C3 with the forward cockpit enclosed as a dedicated cargo compartment. This version was operated in 1928 by National Parks Airways on airmail route CAM 26 from Salt Lake City, Utah to Pocatello, Idaho and Great Falls, Montana.

In 1931, a C3B, nicknamed "The Flying Carpet," was flown around the world by Moye Stephens with travel/adventure writer Richard Halliburton as his passenger and chronicler. Their experience was published in Halliburton's photo-illustrated book The Flying Carpet, (1932, Garden City Publishing, Garden City, NY), which made no mention of the plane's manufacturer or model. (see: Richard Halliburton#Flying Carpet expedition)

== Variants ==
Data from:Airlife's World Aircraft, Aerofiles:Stearman Variants produced were:

C1
First of the C series powered by a Curtiss OX-5, later re-engined with a 240 hp (179 kW) Menasco-Salmson radial as the C1X. One built.
C2
Four aircraft similar to the C1, with the radiator mounted underneath, hydraulic shock absorbers and dual controls. Variously powered by 90 hp (67 kW) Curtiss OX-5, Wright-Hisso A, Wright Whirlwind and Menasco-Salmson radial engine.

C3B Sport Commercial
220 hp (164 kW) Wright J5 radial engine.
C3C
150 hp (112 kW) Wright Martin/Hispano Suiza E engine.
C3D
180 hp (134 kW) Wright Martin/Hispano Suiza E engine. 1 delivered.
C3E
190 hp (142 kW) Wright Martin/Hispano Suiza E2 engine
C3F
190 hp (142 kW) Wright Martin/Hispano Suiza E3 engine.
C3G
190 hp (142 kW) Wright Martin/Hispano Suiza E4 engine.
C3H
260 hp (194 kW) Menasco-Salmson air-cooled engine.
C3I
160 hp (119 kW) Curtiss C6 engine.
C3K
128 hp (95 kW) Siemens-Halske Sh 12.
C3L
130 hp (97 kW) Comet 7D radial engine. 1 built, later converted to C3B.
C3MB
C3B with forward cockpit enclosed for mail carrying.
C3P
220 hp (164 kW) Wright J5 Whirlwind radial engine.
C3R Business Speedster
225 hp (168 kW) Wright J6.

== Operators ==
Peru

- Peruvian Air Force

== Aircraft on display ==
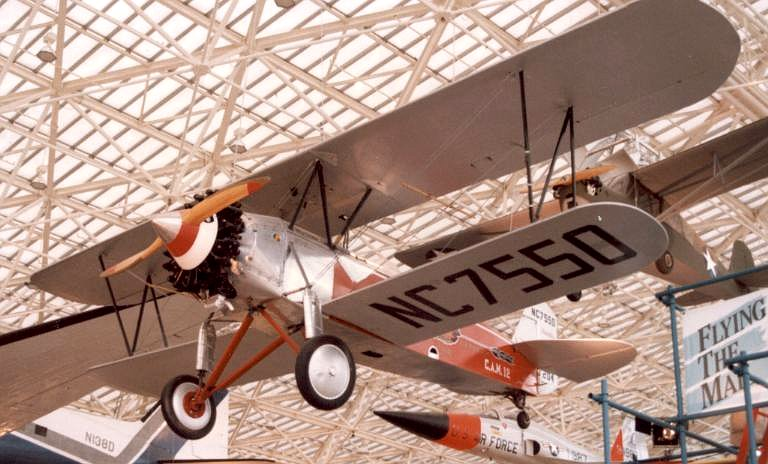
Stearman C3B in 1927 markings of Western Air Express airmail route CAM 12 at the Museum of Flight in Seattle

- Museum of Flight, Seattle, Washington
- Western Antique Aeroplane & Automobile Museum has a 1928 model Stearman C3B NC8830

== Specifications (C3B) ==
Data from

General characteristics

- Crew: 1
- Capacity: 2 passengers
- Length: 24 ft 0 in (7.32 m)
- Wingspan: 35 ft 0 in (10.68 m)
- Height: 9 ft 0 in (2.75 m)
- Empty weight: 1,650 lb (748 kg)
- Max takeoff weight: 2,650 lb (1,202 kg)
- Powerplant: × Wright J5 , 220 hp (160 kW)

Performance

- Maximum speed: 126 mph (203 km/h, 109 kn)
- Cruise speed: 108 mph (174 km/h, 94 kn)
- Range: 620 mi (1,000 km, 540 nmi)
- Rate of climb: 1,000 ft/min (5.1 m/s)

== See also ==
=== Aircraft of comparable role, configuration and era ===
- Alexander Eaglerock
- American Eagle A-101
- Brunner-Winkle Bird
- Buhl-Verville CA-3 Airster
- Command-Aire 3C3
- Parks P-1
- Pitcairn Mailwing
- Spartan C3
- Swallow New Swallow
- Travel Air 2000 and 4000
- Waco 10

=== Related lists ===
- List of aircraft
- List of civil aircraft
