= Alexander Eaglerock =

Biplane

The Alexander Eaglerock is a biplane produced in the United States in the 1920s by Alexander Aircraft Company of Colorado Springs, Colorado. In total 893 planes were built.

It is a fixed-gear three-seater, and was offered in two models, one with a Hispano-Suiza "A" engine of 150 hp (110 kW), priced at US$4000, and one with a Wright J-5 Whirlwind, priced at $6500. The Eaglerock was also available fitted with a variety of other engines, of up to 270 hp (200 kW), with prices starting at $2250.

== Surviving aircraft ==
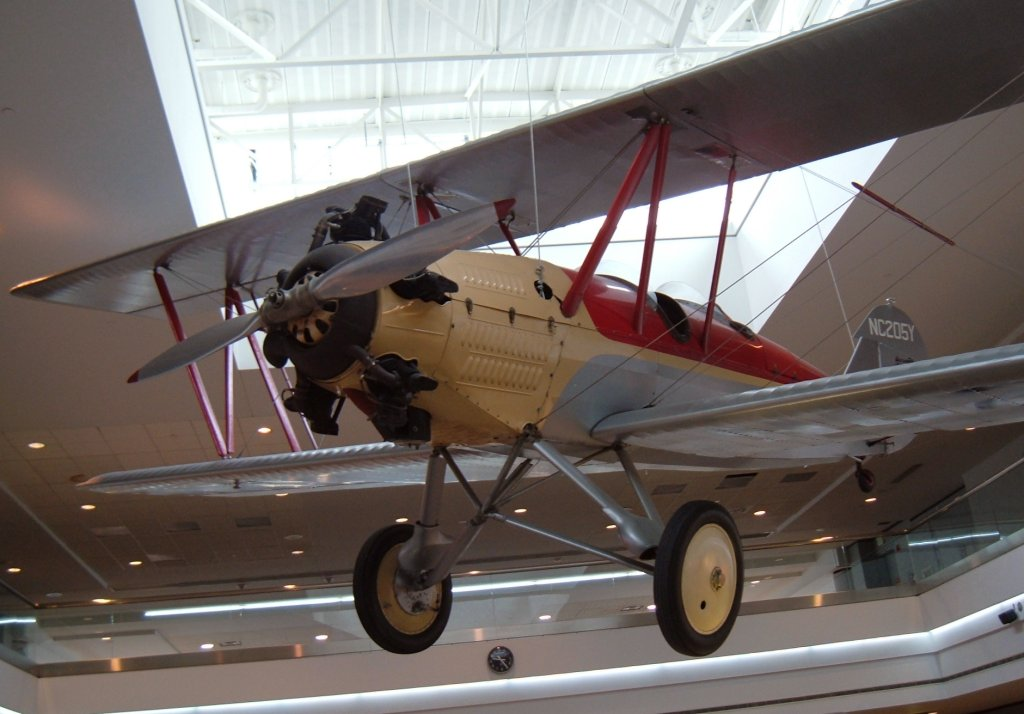
Whirlwind-powered Eaglerock on display at Denver International Airport

- 122 – Model 24 Long Wing on static display at the Pueblo Weisbrod Aircraft Museum in Pueblo, Colorado. It is on loan from the Colorado Aviation Historical Society and was previously on display at the Wings Over the Rockies Air and Space Museum.
- 469 – Combo-wing on static display at Seattle-Tacoma International Airport in SeaTac, Washington. It is on loan from the Museum of Flight.
- 526 – Long Wing airworthy at the Western Antique Aeroplane & Automobile Museum in Hood River, Oregon.
- 663 - A-2 on static display at the Wings Over the Rockies Air and Space Museum in Denver, Colorado.
- 928 – A-2 on static display at the Science Spectrum in Lubbock, Texas.
- 977 – Model A-14 is on static display in Concourse B of Denver International Airport in Denver, Colorado. It was restored over a 25-year period by the Antique Airplane Association of Colorado.

== Specifications (Eaglerock A-1) ==
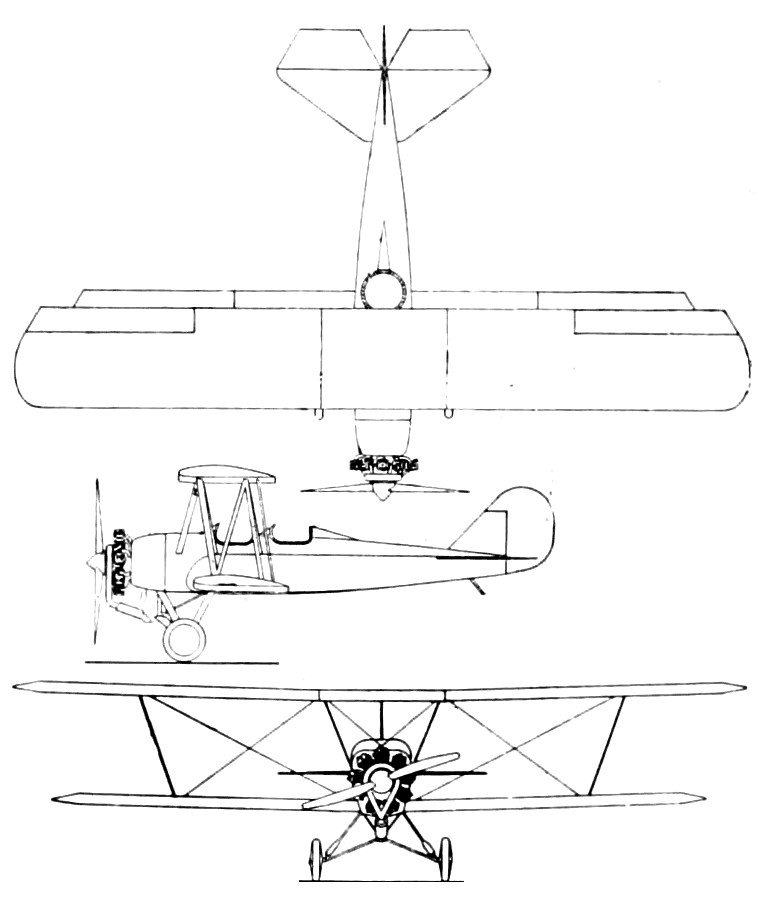
Alexander Eaglerock A-7 3-view drawing from Aero Digest April 1928

Data from American Airplane Specifications

General characteristics

- Crew: 1
- Capacity: 2 passengers
- Length: 25 ft 11 in (7.90 m)
- Wingspan: 36 ft 8 in (11.18 m)
- Height: 9 ft 10 in (3.00 m)
- Wing area: 330 sq ft (31 m^{2})
- Empty weight: 1,705 lb (773 kg)
- Gross weight: 2,491 lb (1,130 kg)
- Fuel capacity: 67 US gal (56 imp gal; 250 L)
- Powerplant: 1 × Wright Whirlwind radial engine, 225 hp (168 kW)

Performance

- Maximum speed: 130 mph (210 km/h, 110 kn)
- Cruise speed: 110 mph (180 km/h, 96 kn)
- Stall speed: 36 mph (58 km/h, 31 kn)
- Range: 590 mi (950 km, 510 nmi)
- Service ceiling: 17,900 ft (5,500 m)
- Rate of climb: 1,080 ft/min (5.5 m/s)

== See also ==
=== Aircraft of comparable role, configuration and era ===
(Partial listing, only covers most numerous types)

- American Eagle A-101
- Brunner-Winkle Bird
- Buhl-Verville CA-3 Airster
- Command-Aire 3C3
- Parks P-1
- Pitcairn Mailwing
- Spartan C3
- Stearman C2 and C3
- Swallow New Swallow
- Travel Air 2000 and 4000
- Waco 10

=== Related lists ===
- List of aircraft
- List of civil aircraft
