= Boeing Model 95 =

Mailplane by Boeing

Model 95
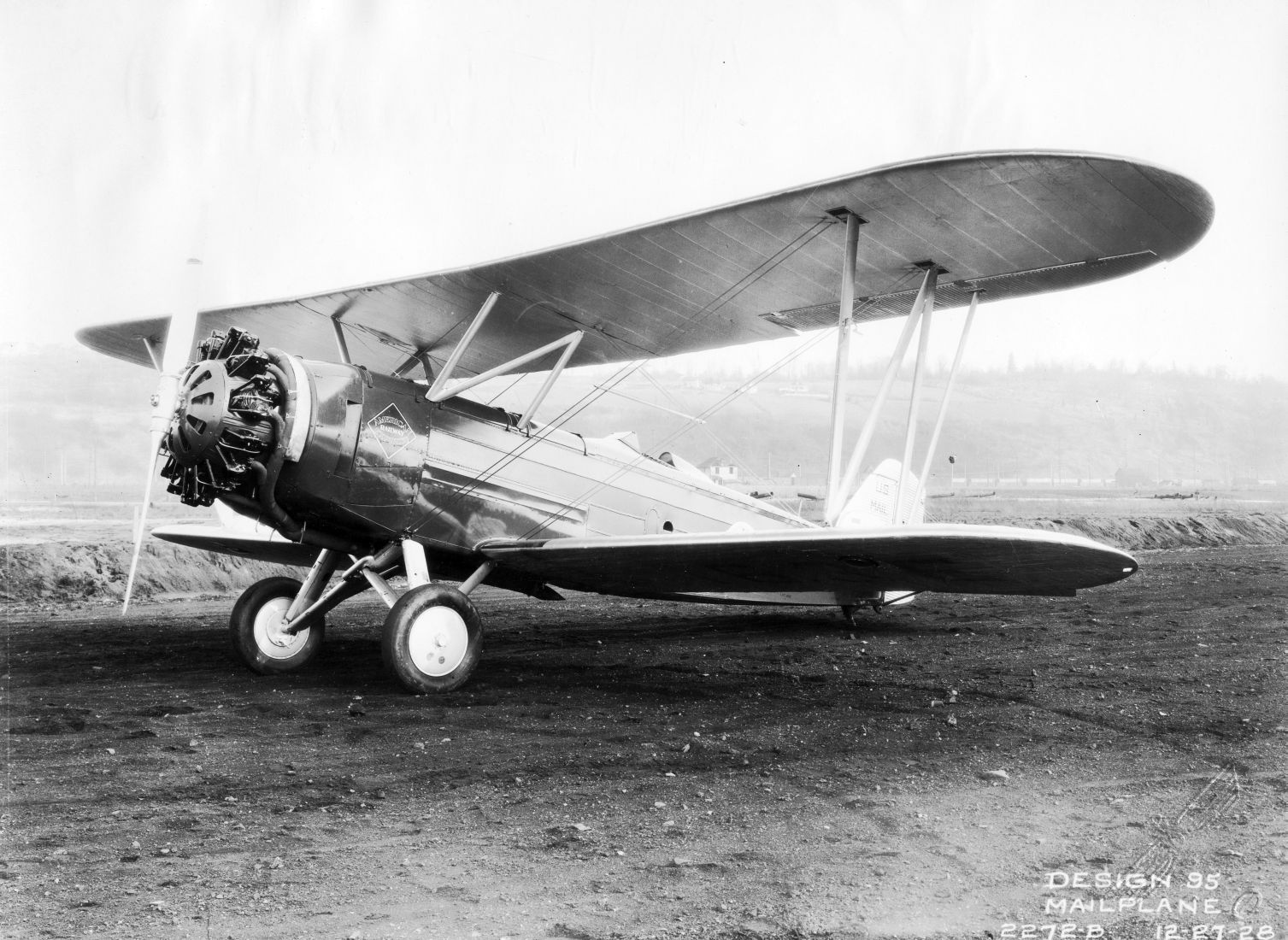

General information
- Type: Mailplane
- Manufacturer: Boeing
- Primary users: Boeing Air Transport Honduran Air Force
- Number built: 25

History
- First flight: 29 December 1928

The Boeing Model 95 was a single engine biplane mailplane built by Boeing in the United States in the late 1920s to supplement the Boeing Model 40s being used on Boeing's airmail routes.

== Development ==
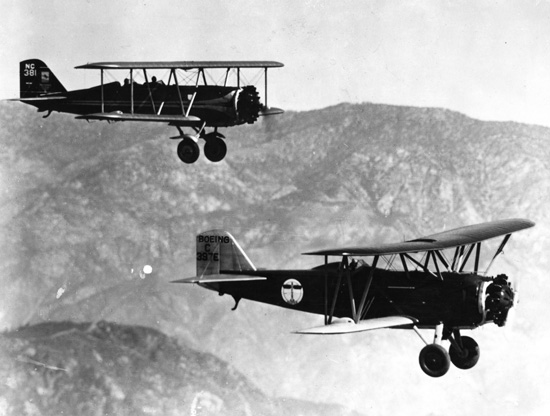
Boeing 95 (front) and Boeing 40 (rear) in flight

While the Model 95 was of the same general configuration as the Model 40, it was larger and more sophisticated aerodynamically and structurally, and was optimized for freight instead of passengers. The fuselage was of far more advanced construction than its predecessor, building on what Boeing had learned about all-metal fuselages while developing the P-12 and F4B fighters, while the wing had stagger and a simplified structure.

== Operational history ==
The majority of Boeing 95s spent their careers flying Boeing's airmail routes, however a small number did find their way to other operators. At least one Boeing 95 was used by the Honduran Air Force as a bomber. Another Model 95 took part in Boeing-arranged inflight refuelling demonstrations in 1929 but was unsuccessful in either of the two attempts made to fly a round-trip across the continental United States without landing.

== Variants ==
Model 95
standard production version
Model 95A
one aircraft built with Pratt & Whitney Wasp engine

== Operators ==
Honduras

- Honduran Air Force

United States

- Boeing Air Transport
- National Air Transport

== Specifications (Model 95) ==
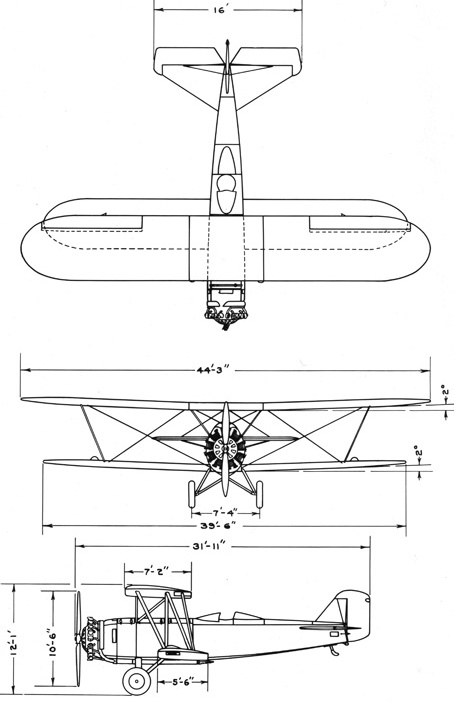
Boeing model 95 drawing

Data from Boeing Aircraft since 1916

General characteristics

- Crew: 1
- Length: 31 ft 11 in (9.73 m)
- Wingspan: 44 ft 3 in (13.49 m)
- Height: 12 ft 1 in (3.68 m)
- Wing area: 490 sq ft (46 m^{2})
- Airfoil: Boeing 109/106
- Empty weight: 3,196 lb (1,450 kg)
- Gross weight: 5,840 lb (2,649 kg)
- Powerplant: 1 × Pratt & Whitney R-1690 Hornet 9-cylinder air-cooled radial engine, 525 hp (391 kW)

Performance

- Maximum speed: 142 mph (229 km/h, 123 kn)
- Cruise speed: 120 mph (190 km/h, 100 kn)
- Range: 520 mi (840 km, 450 nmi)
- Service ceiling: 16,000 ft (4,900 m)
- Rate of climb: 950 ft/min (4.8 m/s)

== Accidents and incidents ==
- On January 10, 1930, a Western Air Express Boeing Air Transport Boeing 95 "NC420E", while flying the US mail on CAM 4 routing from Las Vegas to Salt Lake City crashed in fog and snow south of Cedar City, UT. The pilot, Maurice 'Maury' Graham, survived the crash but died while attempting to hike out. He and the aircraft were found five months later.
- On May 24, 1931, a Pacific Air Transport Boeing 95, registration NC397E, crashed into a mountain near Bellefonte, Pennsylvania in poor visibility, killing the pilot.

== See also ==
Aircraft of comparable role, configuration, and era

- Curtiss Falcon mailplane
- Douglas M-2
- Pitcairn Mailwing
- Stearman M-2 Speedmail
- Stearman 4M

== Bibliography ==
- Bowers, Peter M. (1989). Boeing Aircraft since 1916 (Third ed.). London: Putnam Aeronautical Books. ISBN 0-85177-804-6.
- Hagedorn, Daniel P. (July–November 1986). "From Caudillos to COIN". Air Enthusiast. No. Thirty–one. pp. 55–70. ISSN 0143-5450.
- Taylor, Michael J. H. (1989). Jane's Encyclopedia of Aviation. London: Studio Editions. p. 170.
- World Aircraft Information Files. London: Bright Star Publishing. pp. File 890 Sheet 52.
