= Western Antique Aeroplane & Automobile Museum =

- Location within Oregon
- Established: 2007
- Location: Hood River, Oregon
- Coordinates: 45.677°N 121.5412°W
- Type: Aviation and automobile museum
- Founder: Terry Brandt
- Director: Stephanie Hatch
- Website: www.waaamuseum.org

The Western Antique Aeroplane and Automobile Museum (WAAAM) is an aviation museum located at the Ken Jernstedt Airfield in Hood River, Oregon. The museum is focused on airplanes and motor vehicles from the 1900s to the 1930s.

== History ==
Terry Brandt, the son of an FBO owner, began acquiring antique aircraft early in his life. In 2006, he founded a non-profit organization and on 7 September 2007 of the following year the Western Antique Aeroplane & Automobile Museum opened with 42 aircraft and 20 cars in a 50,000-square-foot (4,600 m^{2}) building. A second hangar was added in 2009, bringing the size of the museum to 95,000 square feet (8,800 m^{2}), and by September of the following year the collection had grown to 75 airplanes and over 100 automobiles. A third hangar was built in 2013. By 2022, the museum had plans for two additional buildings. The museum broke ground on a fourth expansion in 2025.

== Exhibits ==
The façade of a 1940s hangar used by Evergreen Flying Service was salvaged from Evergreen Airport in 2008 and placed on display.

== Collections ==
=== Airplanes ===
- 1902 Wright Glider – glider, replica
- Aeronca 15AC Sedan
- Aeronca C-2
- Aeronca C-3
- Aeronca C-3 – floats
- Aeronca 65-TAL Defender
- Aeronca K
- Aeronca KCA
- Aeronca L-3B Grasshopper
- Aeronca LC
- Alexander Eaglerock Long Wing
- Alfaro PTG-2 – glider
- American Eagle Eaglet B-31
- Arrow Model F
- Arrow Sport Pursuit
- Avian Skyhawk – balloon
- Beechcraft E18S
- Bell 47D-1
- Bellanca 7ACA Champ
- Blériot XI – replica
- Boeing Model 40C
- Boeing-Stearman Model 70
- Boeing-Stearman N2S-3
- Boeing-Stearman PT-17 Kaydet
- Bowers Fly Baby
- Bowlus BA-100 Baby Albatross
- Brunner-Winkle Bird A
- Brunner-Winkle Bird A
- Brunner-Winkle Bird CK
- Buhl LA-1 Bull Pup
- CallAir A-6
- Cessna 195A
- Cessna C-165 Airmaster
- Cessna Model AW
- Cessna UC-78 Bobcat
- Commonwealth Skyranger 185
- Culver Cadet LCA
- Cunningham-Hall PT-6F
- Curtiss Headless Pusher
- Curtiss Headless Pusher – replica
- Curtiss JN-4D Jenny
- Curtiss P-40N Warhawk
- Curtiss-Robertson Robin B
- Curtiss-Wright CW-1 Junior
- Curtiss-Wright CW-12Q
- Curtiss-Wright CW-12W
- Dart Model G
- Davis Aircraft D-1-K
- de Havilland DHC-2 Beaver
- Detroit Gull – glider
- Dittmar Condor IV – glider
- Dormoy Bathtub – replica
- Emigh A-2 Trojan
- Fairchild 22 C7A
- Fairchild 22 C7B
- Fairchild 24 G
- Fairchild F-46
- Fairchild PT-19B
- Fairchild UC-86
- Fleet Model 7
- Fleetwings XBT-12 Sophomore
- Ford 5-AT-C Trimotor
- Frankfort TG-1A – glider
- Franklin PS-2 – glider
- Franklin Sport 90
- Funk Model B
- G.A.C. 102 Aristocrat
- Glasflügel H-301B Libelle – glider
- Great Lakes 2T-1A Sport Trainer
- Heath Super Parasol
- Inland S-300 Sport
- Interstate L-6 Cadet
- Johnson Twin-60
- Kreider-Reisner C-2 Challenger
- Laird LC-1B-300
- Laister-Kauffman TG-4A – glider
- LET L-13 Blaník – glider
- Lincoln PT-K
- Lincoln-Page LP-3
- Long Henderson Longster
- Luscombe 8A
- Luscombe 11A Sedan
- Mercury BT-120
- Monocoupe 70
- Monocoupe 110 Special
- Monocoupe Monocoach
- Moswey III – glider
- Naval Aircraft Factory N3N-3
- Nelson Hummingbird PG-185B
- New Standard D-25
- Nicholas-Beazley NB-8
- North American T-6G Texan
- Oberlerchner Mg 23 SL – glider
- Parks P-1
- Pietenpol Sky Scout
- Piper HE-1
- Piper J3 Cub
- Piper J3 Cub – floats
- Piper J3P Cub
- Piper L-4A Grasshopper
- Piper L-4J Grasshopper
- Piper J4A Cub Coupe
- Piper J4A Cub Coupe
- Piper J5A Cub Cruiser
- Piper PA-14 Family Cruiser – floats
- Piper PA-15 Vagabond
- Piper PA-16 Clipper
- Piper PA-18-150 Super Cub – floats
- Piper PA-22 Tri-Pacer
- Piper TG-8 – glider
- Porterfield CP-50 Collegiate
- Rearwin 8135 Cloudster
- Rearwin 6000M Speedster
- Rearwin 9000-W Sportster
- Republic RC-3 Seabee
- Ryan PT-22 Recruit
- Ryan ST-A Special
- Schleicher Ka7 Rhönadler – glider
- Schleicher Rhönbussard – glider
- Schweizer SGS 2-33 – glider
- Schweizer SGS 2-33A
- Schweizer TG-3A – glider
- Slingsby T.6 Kirby Kite – glider
- Slingsby T.13 Petrel – glider
- Sopwith Pup
- Spalinger S.18 II
- Spartan C2-60
- St. Louis C2 Cardinal
- St. Louis YPT-15
- Standard J-1
- Stearman Model 4-D Junior Speedmail
- Stearman C2
- Stearman C3B
- Stearman Model 6L Cloudboy
- Stearman M-2 Speedmail
- Stinson 108-3
- Stinson SM-8A Junior
- Stinson L-5 Sentinel
- Stinson L-5 Sentinel
- Stinson Model R
- Stinson Model W
- Stinson SR-8B Reliant
- Swallow J5 Swallow
- Swallow OX-5 Swallow
- Swallow TP
- SZD-42 Jantar 2
- Taylor E-2 Cub
- Taylor J-2 Cub
- Taylor J-3 Cub
- Taylorcraft BC-12-65
- Taylorcraft BC-65
- Taylorcraft L-2M Grasshopper
- Taylorcraft TG-6
- Thomas-Morse S-4C
- Travel Air 4-D
- Travel Air 4000
- Travel Air 9000
- Van's RV-8
- Waco 9
- Waco 10
- Waco ATO
- Waco BSO
- Waco CSO
- Waco INF
- Waco GXE
- Waco Primary Glider – glider
- Waco RNF
- Waco UBA
- Waco UBF-2
- Waco UIC
- Waco UPF-7
- Waco YPF
- Wallace Touroplane

=== Automobiles ===
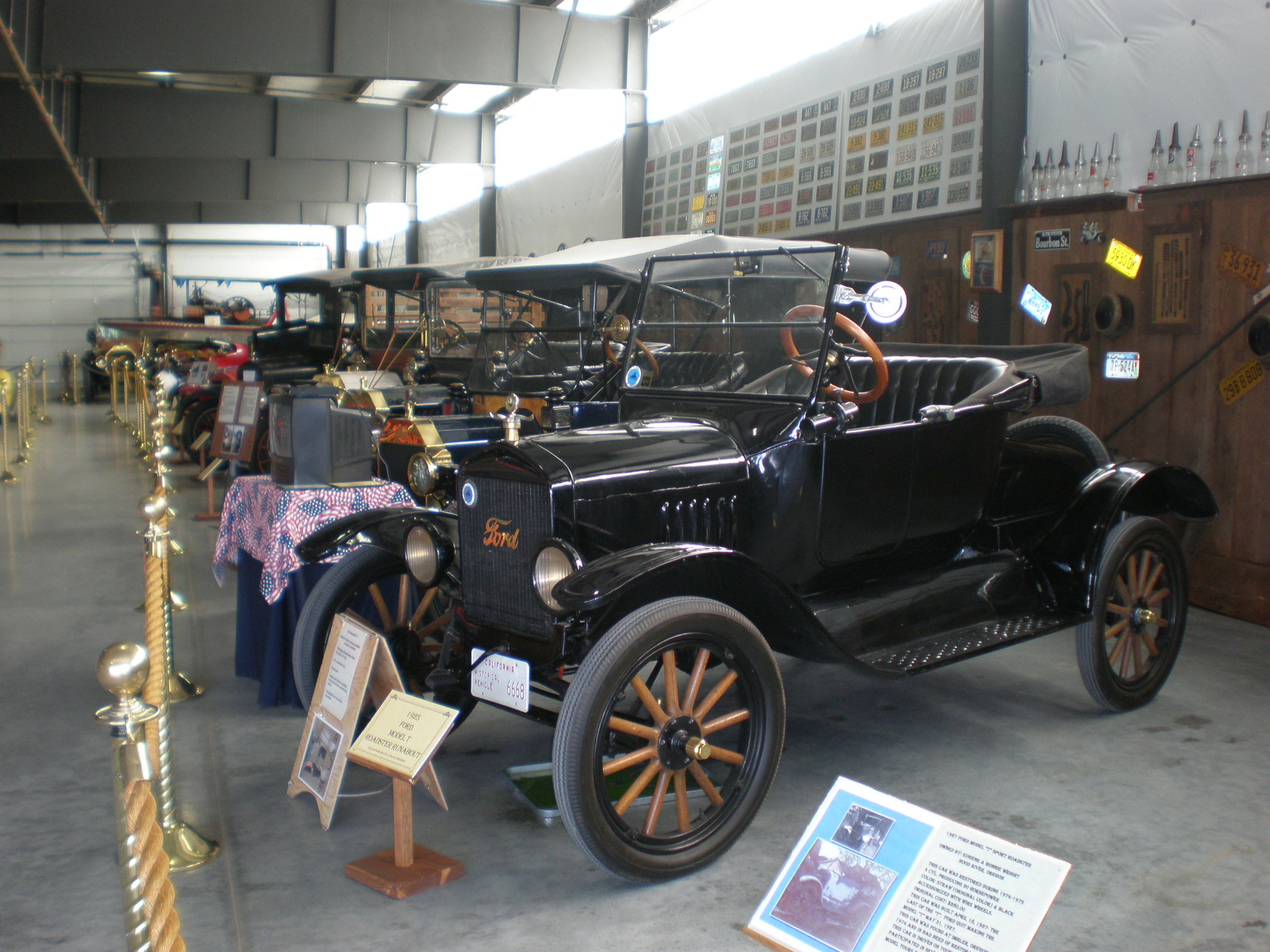
Antique Autos WAAAM

Automobiles include:

- American Austin Coupe -1930
- Autocar Truck -1925
- Brush Runabout Model D -1910
- Buick Model 45 Touring Car -1916
- Buick Series 115 4-dr Sedan -1928
- Buick Series 126 2-dr Sport Coupe -1928
- Buick Super Eight 4-dr Sedan -1941
- Buick Riviera -1965
- Cadillac Eldorado Brougham -1957
- Cadillac Eldorado Biarritz Convertible -1964
- Chevrolet Model 490 Touring Car -1918
- Chevrolet Superior Touring Car -1924
- Chevrolet "Outlaw" Dirt Track Racer -1927
- Chevrolet Imperial Landau Sedan -1927
- Chevrolet 2-dr Sedan -1931
- Chevrolet 4-dr Phaeton -1931
- Chevrolet 4-dr Sedan -1931
- Chevrolet Coupe -1941
- Chevrolet Master Deluxe Business Coupe -1941
- Chevrolet Special Deluxe Cabriolet -1941
- Chevrolet Bel Air 2-dr Convertible -1955
- Chevrolet Corvair Corsa Turbo Convertible -1965
- Chevrolet Corvette Sting Ray Convertible -1966
- Chevrolet Corvette Sting Ray Coupe -1966
- Chevrolet Corvette ZR-1 -1994
- Chevrolet Corvette ZR1 2012
- Chevrolet Corvette ZR1 Convertible 20 - 19
- Chrysler Imperial 8 Limousine -1931
- Chrysler Imperial 8 Phaeton -1931
- Chrysler Airstream 4S -1935
- Chrysler New Yorker -1948
- Chrysler 300F Convertible -1960
- Citroen Type 2 Boattail Cabriolet -1924
- Cord 810 Westchester Sedan -1936
- Crosley Model CD Sedan -1950
- DeSoto Model CF Deluxe 4-dr Sedan -1930
- DeSoto Deluxe 4-dr Sedan -1948
- De Tomaso Pantera GTS -1974
- Detroit Electric Model 63 -1914
- Dodge Flatbed Fire Truck -1932
- Dodge WF-34 Flatbed Truck -1947
- Dodge Meadowbrook 2-dr Sedan -1954
- Dodge Flatbed Truck -1957
- Dodge Viper GTS -1999
- Dodge Brothers Panel Truck -1915
- Dodge Brothers Roadster -1916
- Dodge Brothers Coupe -1926
- Dodge Brothers Victory 6 Deluxe Sedan -1928
- Everybody's Runabout -1907
- Federal Flatbed Truck -1917
- Ford Model T Touring Car -1913
- Ford Model T Depot Hack -1914
- Ford Model T Runabout -1915
- Ford Model T Army Ambulance -1917
- Ford Model T Touring Car -1918
- Ford Model T Quick-build - 19 - 19
- Ford Model T Roadster Pickup Truck -1921
- Ford Model T 3-door Touring Car -1922
- Ford Model T 3-door Touring Car -1923
- Ford Model T Coupe -1923
- Ford Model TT Truck Camper -1924
- Ford Model T Roadster Pickup Truck -1925
- Ford Model T Roadster Runabout -1925
- Ford Model TT Truck -1925
- Ford Model TT Truck -1925
- Ford Model T 2-dr Sedan -1926
- Ford Model T Snow Conversion -1926
- Ford Model T Speedster -1927
- Ford Model T Sport Roadster -1927
- Ford Model A Roadster Pickup Truck -1928
- Ford Model A Speedster -1928
- Ford Model A 2-dr Sedan -1929
- Ford Model A 3-window Town Sedan -1929
- Ford Model A Roadster Pickup Truck -1929
- Ford Model A Standard Sedan -1929
- Ford Model A Standard Coupe -1930
- Ford Model A Standard Coupe -1930
- Ford Model A Truck -1930
- Ford Model A Deluxe 2-dr Sedan -1931
- Ford Model A Roadster -1931
- Ford 1-1/2-Ton Flatbed Truck -1936
- Ford Deluxe 4-dr Sedan -1940
- Ford Deluxe Business Coupe -1940
- Ford Custom Deluxe Convertible -1950
- Ford F3 Custom Pickup Truck -1951
- Ford Fairlane 500 Convertible -1957
- Ford Fairlane 500 Convertible -1957
- Ford Galaxie Sunliner 2-dr Convertible -1960
- Ford Galaxie Sunliner 2-dr Convertible -1961
- Ford Thunderbird Convertible -1962
- Ford Thunderbird Sports Roadster -1962
- Ford Mustang Fastback 2+2 -1966
- Ford Thunderbird Town Landau -1966
- Ford Mustang Shelby GT500 Convertible -1970
- Ford Ranchero GT -1970
- Ford Mustang GT Convertible -1971
- Ford Model T Speedster - 19xx
- Franklin Model D -1909
- Franklin Model 135 -1929
- Graham Cavalier 95 4-dr Sedan -1937
- Graham-Paige Model 612 -1929
- HM Vehicles Free-way Freeway -1981
- Honda N600 2-dr Sedan -1972
- Hudson Super 8 -1930
- Hudson Terraplane 3-passenger Coupe -1937
- Hudson Hornet Club Coupe -1951
- Hummer -1997
- International Model M-W Auto Wagon -1913
- International Model SPD 3/4-Ton Truck -1926
- International 1/2-ton Pickup Truck -1933
- Kaiser Virginian -1950
- Kaiser Manhattan -1953
- Kenworth 3/4-scale tractor - 1960s
- King Eight Model EE 4-dr Touring Car -1917
- Lincoln Zephyr -1941
- Lincoln Continental Mk II -1956
- Lincoln Premier 2-dr Convertible -1956
- Lincoln Continental 4-dr Convertible -1967
- Locomobile Steam Runabout -1900
- Locomobile Model 48 Sportif -1923
- Maxwell Truck -1918
- McLaren 720S 2018
- Mercury Monterey 4-dr Sedan -1950
- Messerschmitt KR200 -1963
- MG cars TD -1953
- Moon Brougham -1927
- Nash Model 4145 Business Coupe -1941
- Nash Metropolitan Convertible -1954
- Oldsmobile Futuramic 88 Holiday Coupe -1950
- Oldsmobile Dynamic 88 -1960
- Oldsmobile 442 Convertible -1970
- Overland Model 82 Touring Car -1915
- Packard Model 640 Super 8 Phaeton -1929
- Packard Model 1108 Twelve Sedan Limousine -1934
- Packard Model 12 Coupe Convertible -1935
- Packard Caribbean 2-dr Convertible -1956
- Packard Clipper -1956
- Pierce-Arrow Model 81 5-Passenger Sedan -1928
- Plymouth Rumble Seat Coupe -1932
- Plymouth Deluxe 4-dr Town Sedan -1934
- Plymouth 2-dr Coupe -1936
- Plymouth Custom Coupe -1936
- Plymouth 2-dr Coupe -1939
- Plymouth Special Deluxe 4-dr Sedan -1949
- Plymouth Barracuda -1968
- Pontiac Chieftain -1955
- Pontiac Catalina Custom Coupe -1960
- Pontiac GTO -1968
- Pontiac Firebird 400 -1969
- Porsche 356A 1600 Speedster -1958
- Porsche 356B 1600 Super -1960
- Rambler American Classic 770 -1966
- REO The Fifth Touring Car -1913
- Republic Model - 19 Flatbed Truck - 19 - 19
- Saleen S7 Twin Turbo 2006
- Samson Tractor 1-1/4 Ton Flatbed Truck - 19 - 19
- Scripps-Booth Model 39B Touring Car - 19 - 19
- Star Sport Touring Car -1925
- Studebaker Avanti II -1981
- Studebaker Dictator Coupe -1928
- Studebaker Commander 8 -1929
- Studebaker Model 55 Regis Sport Coupe -1932
- Studebaker Commander Starlight Coupe -1947
- Studebaker 1-1/2 ton Flatbed Truck -1950
- Studebaker Champion -1951
- Studebaker Golden Hawk -1957
- Studebaker Lark VIII Deluxe Station Wagon -1960
- Trumbull Model 15B Roadster -1915
- Velie Model 58 5-passenger Touring Car -1922
- Volkswagen Super Beetle -1971
- Willys Americar -1942
- Willys Jeep CJ-3B -1955
- Willys-Knight Model 70A 4-dr Sedan -1927
- Willys-Knight Model 70A 4-dr Sedan -1927
- Willys-Overland Model 81 Roadster -1915
- Willys-Overland Model 83 Roadster -1916
- Willys-Overland Model 75B -1917
- Willys-Overland Model 6-90 Roadster -1932

=== Motorcycles ===
- 1912 Indian Model D
- 1918 Harley-Davidson 18J
- 1923 Douglas
- 1923 Henderson Model K Deluxe
- 1924 AJS
- 1927 Harley-Davidson JD
- 1933 Harley-Davidson VLE
- 1937 Harley-Davidson UL
- 1938 BMW R71 BY DT
- 1938 Indian Four
- 1942 Harley-Davidson WLA
- 1947 Indian Chief
- 1948 Schwinn Whizzer
- 1950 Velocette MAC
- 1954 Cushman Eagle with Sidecar
- 1957 Vincent Series "C" Comet
- 1958 Cushman 721/28
- 1958 Cushman 765 Eagle
- 1959 Cushman Super Eagle
- 1963 Honda CA-110
- 1964 Velocette Vogue
- 1971 Velocette LE Mark III
- 1975 Moto Guzzi 850-T

== Events ==
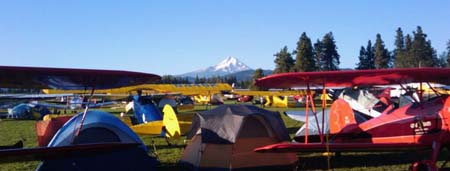
WAAAM Fly-In morning

The museum holds an annual Hood River Fly-In on the first weekend after Labor Day. It also holds a Traffic Jam Car Show in early July.

== Programs ==
The museum holds driving schools for Model Ts and other vintage cars.

== See also ==
- List of aerospace museums
