= Cunningham-Hall PT-6 NC692W =

American 1930s light aircraft

- Cunningham-Hall PT-6, NC-692W (serial #2962)
- U.S. National Register of Historic Places
- Alaska Heritage Resources Survey
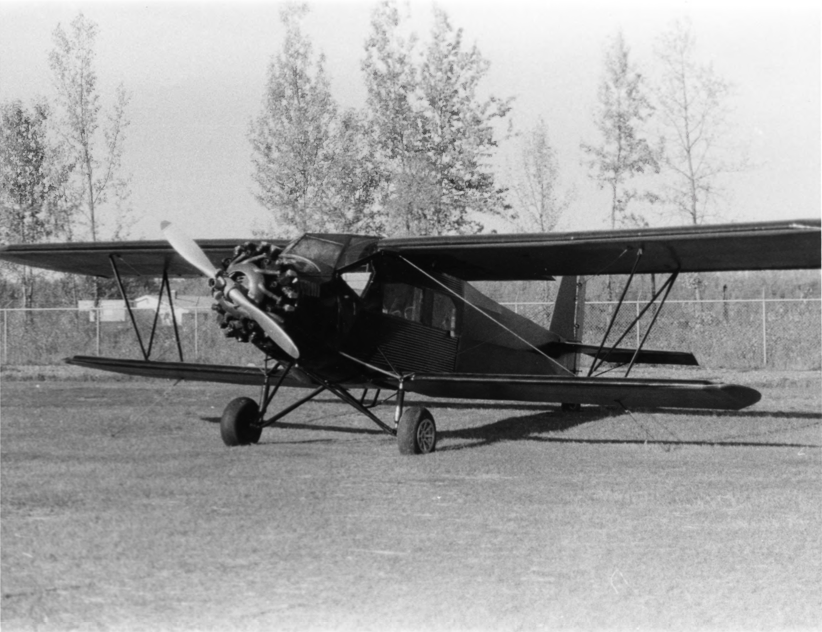
- NC692W in 1977

- Location within Alaska
- Location: Alaska Museum of Transportation and Industry, 3800 West Museum Drive, Wasilla, Alaska
- Coordinates: 61°34′38″N 149°32′39″W
- Area: less than one acre
- Built: 1930
- Built by: Cunningham-Hall Aircraft Corporation
- NRHP reference No.: 78000531
- AHRS No.: ANC-131
- Added to NRHP: December 29, 1978

Cunningham-Hall PT-6 NC692W is one of two surviving aircraft of its type from the early days of aviation in the history of Alaska. The Cunningham-Hall PT-6 is a single-engine six-seat cabin biplane built by the Cunningham-Hall Aircraft Corporation, which was designed mainly as a personal transport. The aircraft, registered as NC692W, with c/n. 2962, was built in 1930 and is the second of its kind constructed. It was entirely rebuilt as a static display using non-airworthy materials in the 1970s.

At the time of its listing on the U.S. National Register of Historic Places in 1978, it was stationed at the Transportation Museum of Alaska, in Palmer. It was later moved to the Alaska Museum of Transportation and Industry in Wasilla, Alaska.

== See also ==
- National Register of Historic Places listings in Matanuska-Susitna Borough, Alaska
