= Pioneer Flight Museum =

- Location within Texas
- Location: Kingsbury, Texas
- Coordinates: 29.6350°N 97.8122°W
- Type: Aviation museum
- Founder: Roger Freeman
- Website: www.pioneerflightmuseum.org

The Pioneer Flight Museum is an aviation museum located at Old Kingsbury Aerodrome Airport in Kingsbury, Texas.

== History ==
=== Background ===
Roger Freeman grew up in California with his father, who restored vintage aircraft. He worked on the set of the movie The Great Waldo Pepper and started a business called Vintage Aviation Services. In 1991, he resigned as an airline pilot and founded the museum in Zuehl, Texas.

=== Establishment ===
Ground was broken for the Pioneer Flight Museum in 2000. Around the same time, the Vintage Aircraft Historical Foundation was established to support the museum.

== Exhibits ==
Exhibits include antique engines.

== Collection ==
=== Aircraft ===
- ASL Valkyrie – replica
- Auster AOP.9
- Blériot XI – replica
- Breese Penguin – replica
- Champion 7AC Champion
- Curtiss JN-4
- Curtiss Junior
- Dormoy Bathtub
- Fokker D.VII – replica
- Fokker Dr.I – replica
- Great Lakes Sport Trainer
- Inland W-500 Super Sport
- Meyers OTW-160
- Pietenpol Sky Scout
- Piper J3C Cub
- Rearwin Sportster
- Thomas-Morse S-4C
- Waco 10

=== Ground vehicles ===
- 1914 Ford Model T Speedster
- 1915 Ford Model T Speedster
- 1916 French Ambulance
- 1917 American Ambulance
- 1917 Indian Motorcycle
- 1917 U.S. Signal Corps Utility Truck
- 1918 Nash Quad Army Truck
- 1921 Triumph Model H Motorcycle
- 1925 Ford Model T Wrecker
- 1925 Ford Model TT School Bus
