= Stearman 4 =

Commercial biplane aircraft

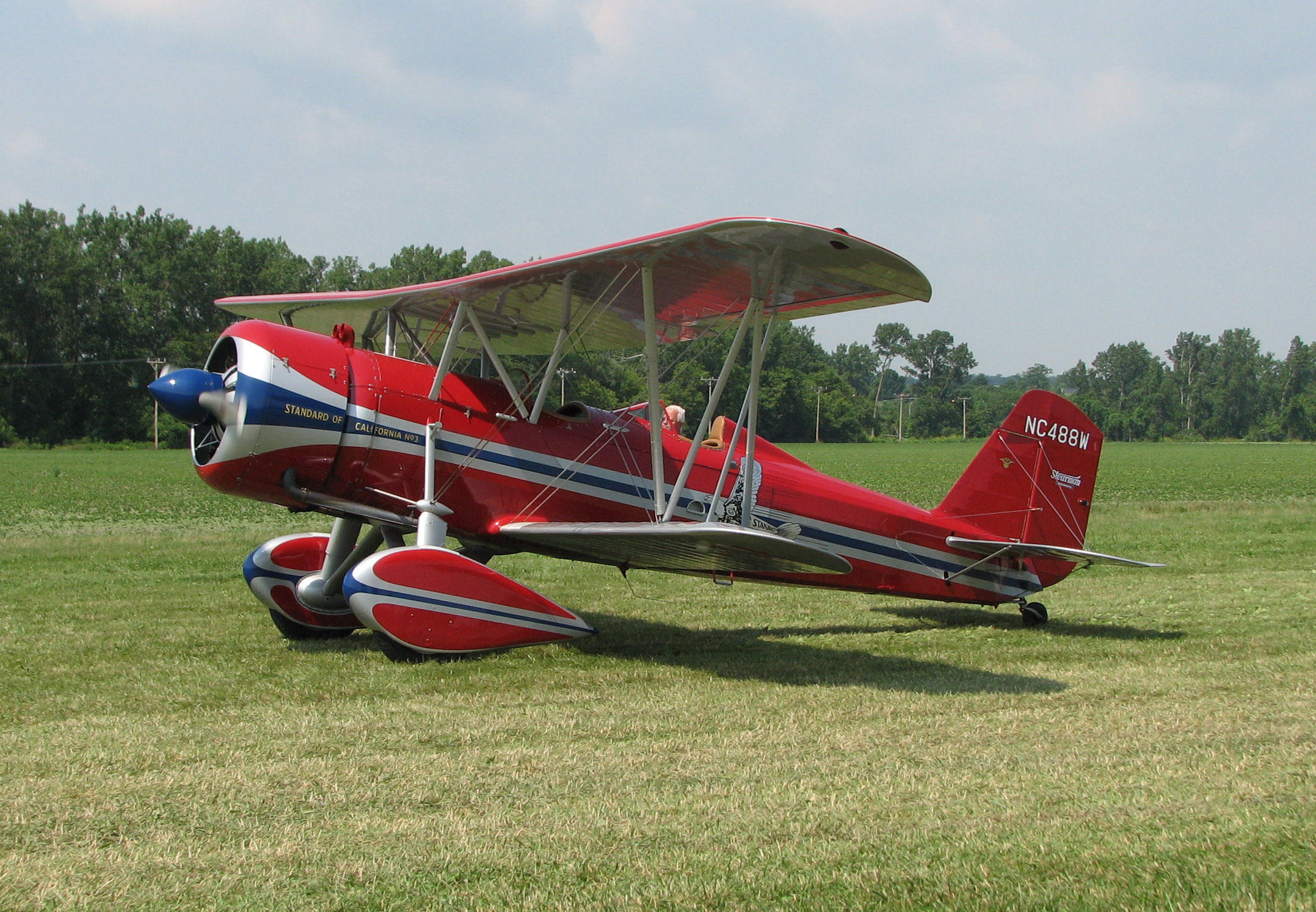
- Restored Stearman 4-CM-1 Junior Speedmail

General information
- Type: Mailplane/transport
- National origin: United States
- Manufacturer: Stearman Aircraft
- Designer: Lloyd Stearman
- Status: Several currently fly in private ownership
- Primary user: Commercial air carriers
- Number built: 41

History
- First flight: 1930
- Developed from: Stearman C3

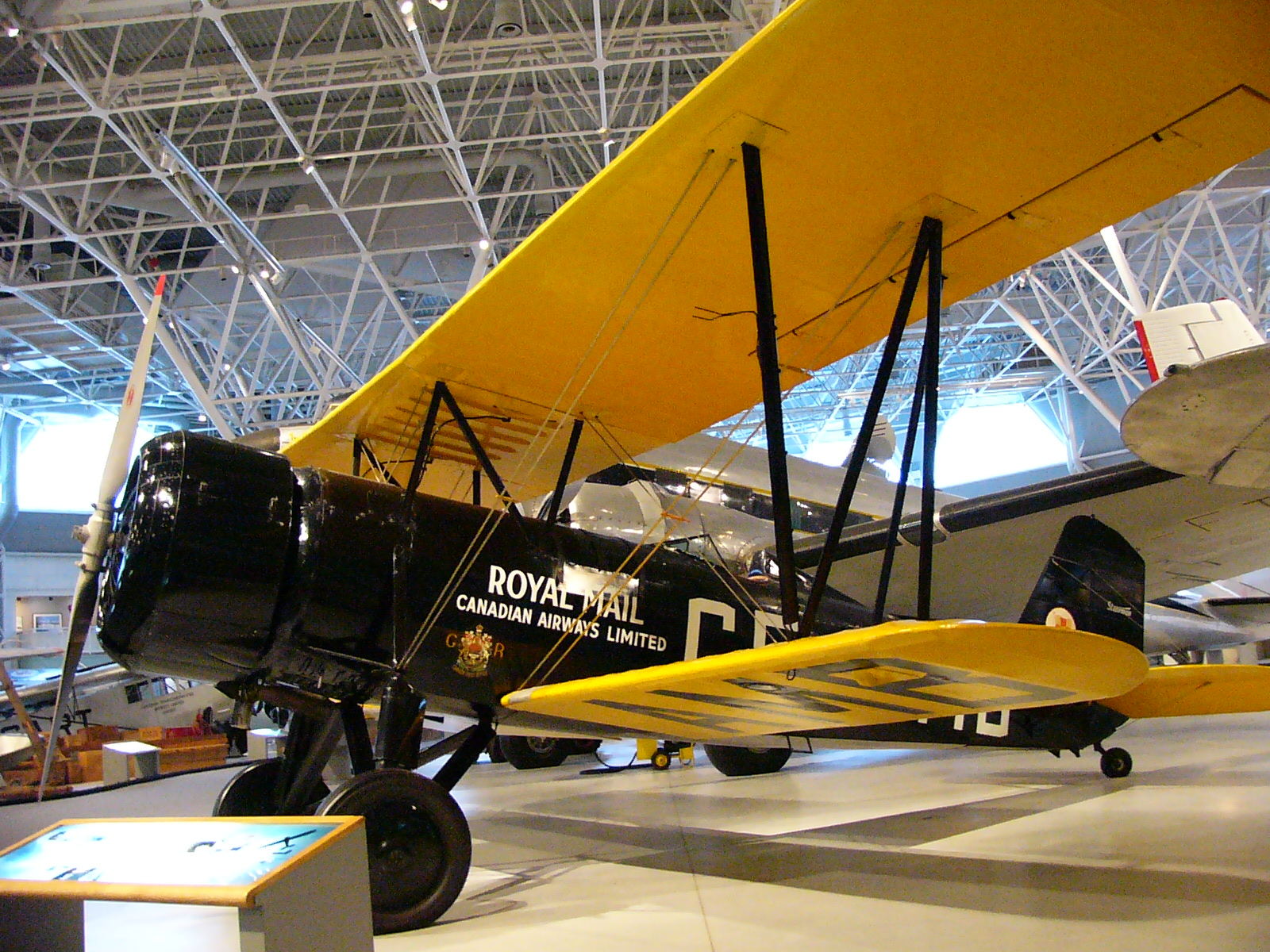
A Stearman 4-EM Senior Speedmail in the Canada Aviation Museum.

The Stearman 4 is an American commercial biplane that was manufactured in the 1920s by Stearman Aircraft. They were marketed at the time as fast and luxurious executive transports and mail planes for about US$16,000.

== Development ==
Stearman Aircraft developed the Model 4 from the C3, adding a deeper fuselage and offering a range of more powerful engines. These features enabled the Model 4 to carry heavier cargo loads. Being larger than the C3, but smaller than the M-2 and LT-1 models, it filled a gap in the Stearman product line. Heaters were provided for both cockpits.

== Operational history ==
Stearman sold the Model 4 to commercial operators in the United States, building 41 before ending production. Users of the type included Varney Air Lines and American Airways (later American Airlines). Standard Oil operated three Junior Speedmails for product promotion. The aircraft was produced in Wichita, Kansas from September 1929 to August 1930.

In Canada, Trans-Canada Air Lines (later Air Canada) bought three Stearman for pilot training and surveying new routes and were used from 1937 to 1939. One of them was sold in March 1939.

1930s socialite aviator Aline Rhonie flew NC796H (which still exists but is now registered as NC774H) out of Long Island, New York, before later joining the British war effort with the Air Transport Auxiliary.

The aircraft's rugged construction helped it survive heavy handling and loads, and thirteen remained on the U.S. Civil Register in 1965. Several were operated as crop dusters, with their forward mail compartment converted into a hopper. Many later passed to private owners of veteran planes and are airworthy or in museums.

== Variants ==
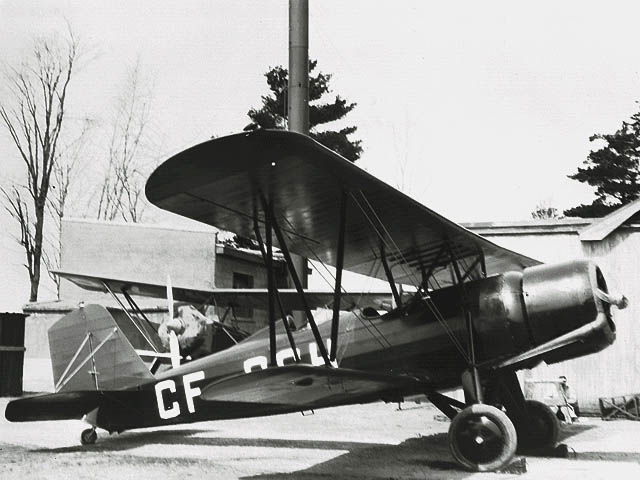
Stearman 4-C Junior Speedmail CF-CCH showing characteristic front manifold exhaust of the Wright J6 radial.

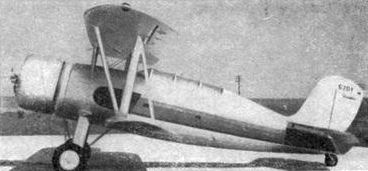
Stearman Model 81 photo from L'Aerophile July 1933

The first letter of the designation refers to the engine while an M indicates that it was intended as a mailplane, with the forward compartment covered. Minor modifications were made to the design which were reflected in the use of -1 after the designation. Reference: Simpson

4-C/C-4/C-4A Junior Speedmail (Approved Type Certificate (ATC) 304)
powered by 300 hp (224 kW) Wright J6-9 radial, 10 built.
4-CM Senior Speedmail (ATC 325)
Single seat mailplane version of the 4-C. 15 built including three converted from 4-Cs.
4-D Junior Speedmail (ATC 305)
First certified aircraft with the then new 300 hp (224 kW) Pratt & Whitney Wasp Junior, 8 were built, including 1 as 4-DX.
4-DX Junior Speedmail (ATC 2-406)
One built with a 400 hp (298 kW) Pratt & Whitney Wasp S1A and a canopy over both cockpits.
4-DM Senior Speedmail (ATC 326)
Single seat mailplane version of the 4-D. Two built, both converted from other models.
4-E/C4W Junior Speedmail (ATC 292)
420 hp (313 kW) Pratt & Whitney C-1 Wasp or 450 hp (336 kW) Pratt & Whitney Wasp 11 built.
4-EX Senior Speedmail (ATC 2-279)
One customized 4-E built for Standard Oil with a 450 hp (336 kW) Pratt & Whitney Wasp SC.
4-EM Senior Speedmail (ATC 322)
Single seat mailplane version of the 4-E.
4-RM Special (no ATC issued)
One 4-CM was converted into a four seater and powered by a 450 hp (336 kW) Ranger GV-770.
Model 80 Sportster (ATC 504)
1933 one-off custom two-seater with dual controls and an enclosed canopy for the rear cockpit, with a 420 hp (313 kW) Pratt & Whitney Wasp Junior T3A engine.
Model 81 (ATC 504)
One built as a trainer variant of the 80 with enclosed canopy over both cockpits. Sold to the Mexican government after a tour of South America while on floats.

== Operators ==
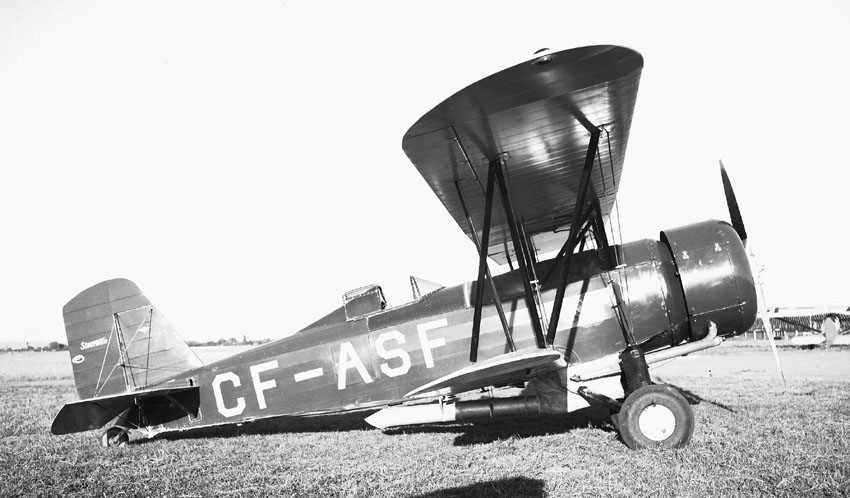
Northern Airways Stearman 4-EM CF-ASF with crop dusting attachment under the fuselage

Canada

- Canadian Airways - 4
- Northern Airways

United States

- American Airlines
- Department of Commerce Airways branch (4-C)
- Fenstra Steel (4-C)
- Pratt & Whitney (4-D)
- Richfield Oil Company
- Texaco (4-D as number 14)
- Varney Air Lines
- Western Air Express (4-D)

== Surviving aircraft ==
Stearman 4-E NC667K at 2013 SUN 'n FUN fly-in

- c/n 4005 4-E Junior Speedmail N663K - privately owned, in National Air Tour markings.
- c/n 4007 4-E Junior Speedmail NC667K - delivered in 1929 to the Richfield Oil Company as the "Jimmie Allen Flying Club" flagship and used until 1937. Following a 2007 restoration, it flies on the North American air show circuit and in 2013 won the Sun 'n Fun Grand Champion - Antique award.
- c/n 4021 4-EM Senior Speedmail CF-AMB - displayed at the Canada Aviation and Space Museum in Ottawa, Ontario.
- c/n 4022 4-CM Junior Speedmail NC785H - privately owned, flown in Standard Oil Stanavo colors.
- c/n 4025 4-D Junior Speedmail NC774H - airworthy at the Western Antique Aeroplane and Automobile Museum, Hood River, Oregon, flown in Western Air Express colors.
- c/n 4026 4-E Junior Speedmail N11224 - displayed at the Yanks Air Museum in Chino, California.
- c/n 4027 4-D Junior Speedmail NC563Y - displayed at the Kansas Aviation Museum in Wichita, Kansas in Texaco markings.
- c/n 4033 4-DM Senior Speedmail NC485W - built as a 4-CM and re-engined, privately owned, flown in American Airways colors.
- c/n 4036 4-CM-1 Senior Speedmail - NC488W privately owned, flown in Standard Oil Stanavo colors.
- c/n 4037 4-CM-1 Junior Speedmail NC489W - privately owned, flown in Standard Oil Stanavo colors.
- c/n 4040 4-C Junior Speedmail N11722 - privately owned.

== Specifications (4-E) ==
Data from Green, 1965, p. 298

General characteristics

- Crew: one
- Capacity: two passengers
- Length: 26 ft 4 in (8.0 m)
- Wingspan: 38 ft 0 in (11.6 m)
- Height: 10 ft 2 in (3.2 m)
- Empty weight: 2,426 lb (1,100 kg)
- Gross weight: 3,936 lb (1,785 kg)
- Powerplant: 1 × Pratt & Whitney Wasp , 450 hp (336 kW)

Performance

- Maximum speed: 158 mph (256 km/h, 137 kn)
- Cruise speed: 128 mph (206 km/h, 111 kn)
- Stall speed: 53 mph (85 km/h, 46 kn)
- Range: 645 mi (1,045 km, 560 nmi)
- Service ceiling: 18,000 ft (5,490 m)
- Rate of climb: 1,400 ft/min (7.1 m/s)

== See also ==
Related development

- Stearman LT-1
- Stearman M-2 Speedmail

Aircraft of comparable role, configuration, and era

- Avro 627 Mailplane
- Boeing Model 40
- Douglas M-1
- Pitcairn Mailwing
- Pitcairn PA-4 Fleetwing II
- Swallow New Swallow
- Waco Mailplanes
