= Franklin Sport =

1930 two seat sport and training biplane

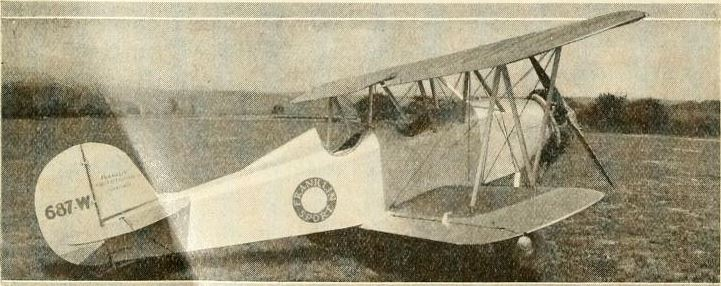
- Sport 90

General information
- Type: Sport and training two-seater
- National origin: United States
- Manufacturer: Franklin Aircraft
- Designer: Joseph Bauer, Vener Eichholtz, L G Felderman
- Number built: 15 flown

History
- First flight: 27 January 1930

The Franklin Sport is a two-seat sport and training biplane built in the U.S. in 1930. Several different engines, in the power range 55–90 hp (41–67 kW), were fitted. Two remained airworthy in 2011.

== Design and development ==
The Sport is a single bay, unequal span biplane. Its wings are built around twin spruce spars and, like the rest of the aircraft, fabric covered. Upper and lower wings have the same chord and outward-leaning, N-form interplane struts between their spars provide a wide interplane gap of about 50 in (1,300 mm). The upper wing is without dihedral but the lower, equipped with Frise ailerons, is set at 2°. Both wings are rectangular in plan out to rounded tips though the upper wing, held centrally over the fuselage on a cabane, has a semi-circular cut-out to increase the pilot's upwards field of view.

All the Sport variants were powered by one of three types of five cylinder radial engine, nose-mounted on a frame which allowed easy exchanges between types. The fuselage has a flat-sided steel tube Warren girder structure with two open cockpits, one between the wings and the other just aft of the upper trailing edge with an extended, faired headrest. It is normally piloted from the rear seat, though the forward cockpit also has flight controls. Some instruments like the fuel gauge are visible from either seat. At the rear the tail also has a steel tube structure. The tailplane and elevators are mounted on top of the fuselage and the fin and unbalanced rudder have a rounded profile.

The landing gear is fixed and of the split axle type, with mainwheels on V-struts from the central fuselage underside and with vertical oleo struts from the outer axle to the wing leading edges, where single bracing struts connect to the upper fuselage longerons. A short tailskid is mounted on the extreme rear fuselage.

== Operational history ==
The Sport prototype, powered by a 55 hp (41 kW) Velie M-5 engine, first flew on 27 January 1930. After tests this was abandoned and production aircraft had either a 65 hp (48 kW) M-5 (Sport A, 8 built) or a 90 hp (67 kW) Lambert R-266 (Sport 90, 6 built) engine.

The histories of most of these club aircraft is uncertain. Further production ended in 1933 when Franklin Aircraft ceased trading. Two, both Sport 90s, remained airworthy in U.S. museums in 2011, though only one was on public display.

== Variants ==
Data from aerofiles

Sport 55
1930, Prototype, 55 hp (41 kW) Velie M-5. One only.
Sport 65 (Sport A)
1930, 65 hp (48 kW) M-5. Eight built.
Sport 70 (Sport B)
1930, 70 hp (52 kW) Le Blond 5DE. Built but not flown.
Sport 90
1931 90 hp (67 kW) Lambert R-266. Six built.

== Aircraft on display ==
- Sport 90: (NC 13271), Western Antique Aeroplane and Automobile Museum, Hood River, Oregon

== Specifications (Sport 90) ==
Data from Aero Digest, January 1931, except where noted. Performance figures are manufacturer's estimates.

General characteristics

- Crew: one
- Capacity: one passenger
- Length: 19 ft 6 in (5.94 m)
- Upper wingspan: 26 ft 0 in (7.92 m)
- Lower wingspan: 24 ft (7.3 m)
- Dihedral: 2°, lower wing only
- Stagger: 22°
- Wing area: 185 sq ft (17.2 m^{2}) total, upper 100.5 sq ft (9.34 m^{2}), lower 84.5 sq ft (7.85 m^{2})
- Airfoil: Aeromarine 2A
- Empty weight: 1,418 lb (643 kg)
- Useful load: 570 lb (260 kg)
- Fuel capacity: 24 US gal (20 imp gal; 91 L)
- Powerplant: 1 × Lambert R-266 five cylinder radial, 90 hp (67 kW)
- Propellers: 2-bladed

Performance

- Maximum speed: 120 mph (190 km/h, 100 kn)
- Cruise speed: 105 mph (169 km/h, 91 kn)
- Landing speed: 30 mph (48 km/h; 26 kn)
- Range: 430 mi (690 km, 370 nmi)
- Service ceiling: 12,000 ft (3,700 m)
- Rate of climb: 900 ft/min (4.6 m/s)
