= Cunningham-Hall PT-6 =

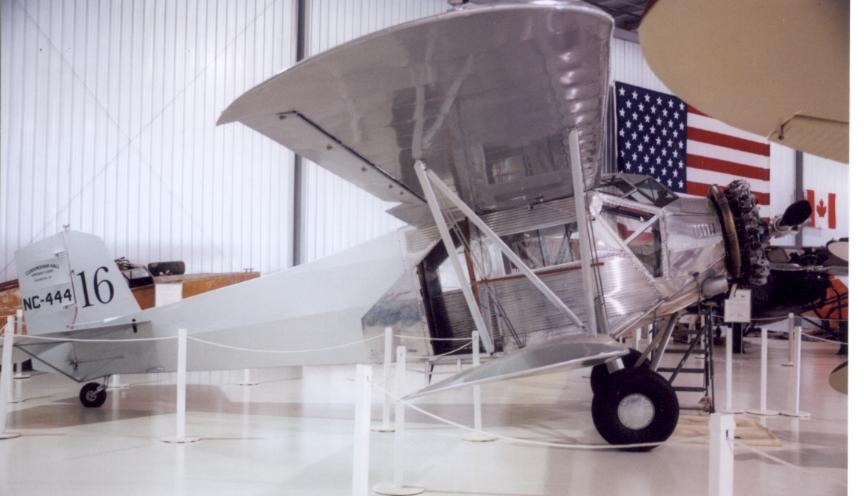

General information
- Type: Six-seat cabin biplane
- Manufacturer: Cunningham-Hall Aircraft Corporation
- Designer: Randolph F. Hall
- Status: retired
- Number built: 3

History
- First flight: 3 April 1929

The Cunningham-Hall Model PT-6 was an American six-seat cabin biplane aircraft of the late 1920s and was the first design of the Cunningham-Hall Aircraft Corporation of Rochester, New York.

== Development and design ==
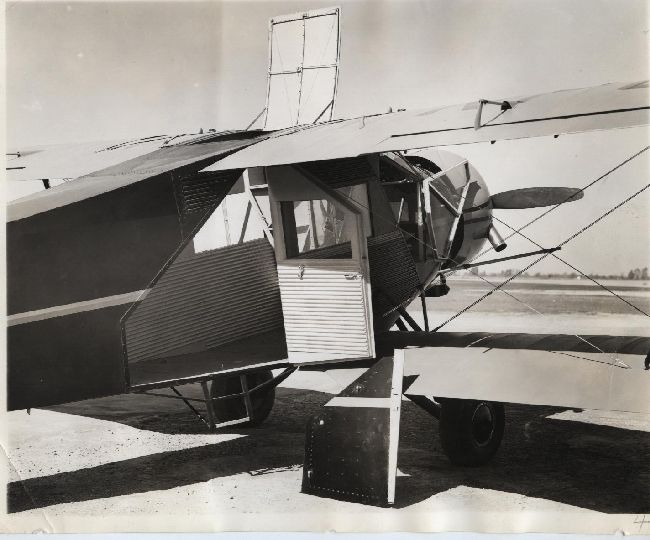
Cunningham-Hall PT-6F showing both cargo doors open

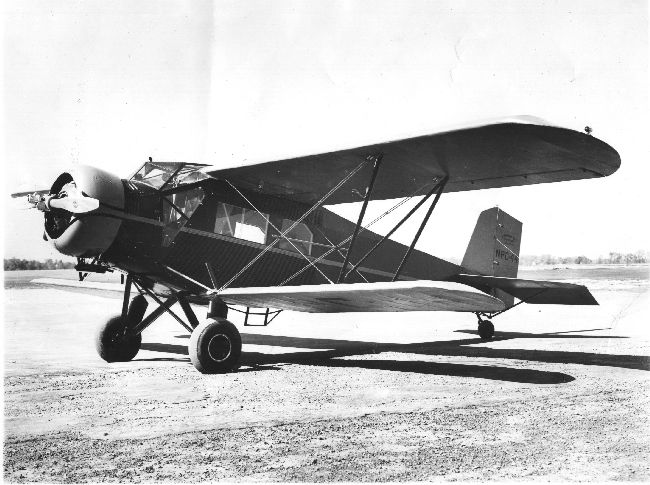
PT-6F painted for export to the Philippines, with the Philippine registration NPC-44

The Cunningham-Hall Aircraft Corporation was formed in 1928 and the first design was the PT-6 (Personal Transport 6-place), which first flew on April 3, 1929. It was flown to the Detroit Aircraft Show two days later, with minor alterations being made later including a switch from a tailskid to a tailwheel.

The PT-6 was a cabin biplane with an all-metal structure that was stressed to meet military strength specifications rather than the much more lenient commercial requirements, however aside from the cabin, which was covered with corrugated aluminum, most of the airframe was fabric covered. It had a fixed landing gear with a tail wheel. The cockpit held a pilot and either a copilot or passenger, with a separate cabin for four passengers. The aircraft was powered by a 300 hp (220 kW) Wright J-6-9 Whirlwind radial engine.

The company's final aircraft was a freighter conversion the PT-6F. Built during 1937 and flown in 1938, the passenger cabin was modified as a cargo compartment with 156 cu ft (4.4 m^{3}) of stowage space, an NACA cowling was fitted, along with a variable-pitch propeller. A freight door was fitted to the fuselage and a loading hatch fitted in the roof. It was powered by a Wright R-975E-1 radial engine of slightly greater power.

Only two PT-6s (s/n 2961 X461E and s/n 2962 NC692W) and one PT-6F (s/n 381 NC16967/NPC44/NC444) were registered, however as many as six of each type may have been built. The discrepancy from many publications with higher numbers may indicate that from two to nine additional airframes were built, but scrapped without being registered or sold, due to the collapse of the aviation market with the deepening of the Great Depression. A production line had been set up, and materials bought to produce 25 examples.

Plans for a slightly smaller 4-seat derivative to be named the PT-4, and an armed military variant were also cancelled.

== Operational history ==
One example was used for charter flying by the Rochester - Buffalo Flying Service, often fitted with skis or floats. One customer was the Fairchild Aviation Corporation. George Eastman of Kodak had his first flight in PT-6 The PT-6F was supposed to have been one of three built from parts still available from the original cancelled production run, for an expected Philippine customer, and even carried the Philippine registration of NPC-44, however a lack of funds caused that sale to be cancelled. The aircraft was eventually sold for around $7,000, and made its way to Alaska for a career as a bush plane with Byers Airways.

== Variants ==
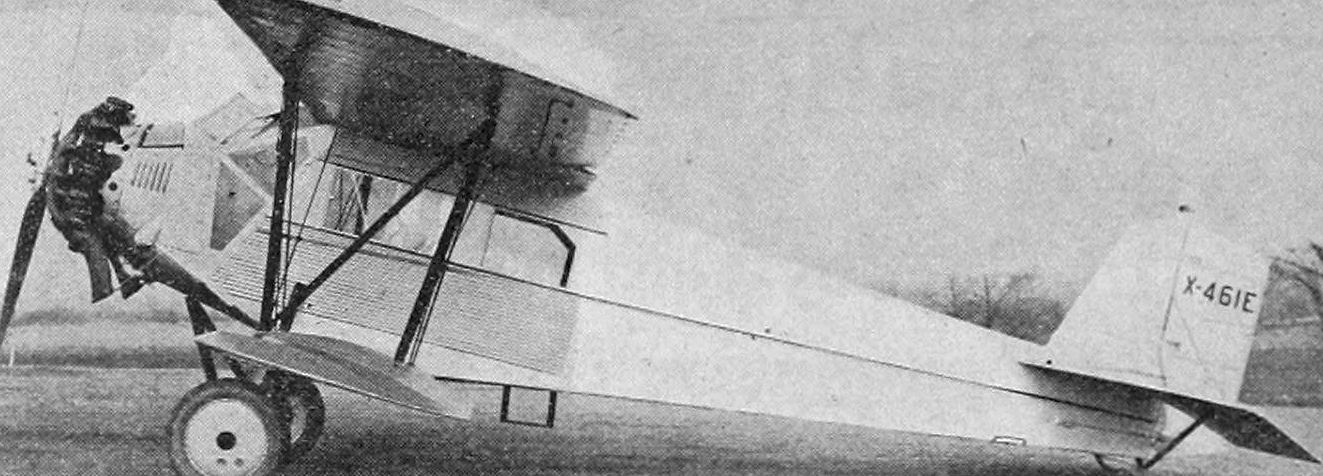
The first PT-6 built, X461E

PT-6
Six-seat cabin biplane powered by a 300 hp (220 kW) Wright J-6 Whirlwind radial engine.
PT-6F
Freighter version of the PT-6.
PT-4
Cancelled 4 place version.
PT-6 Bomber
Cancelled bomber with turret.

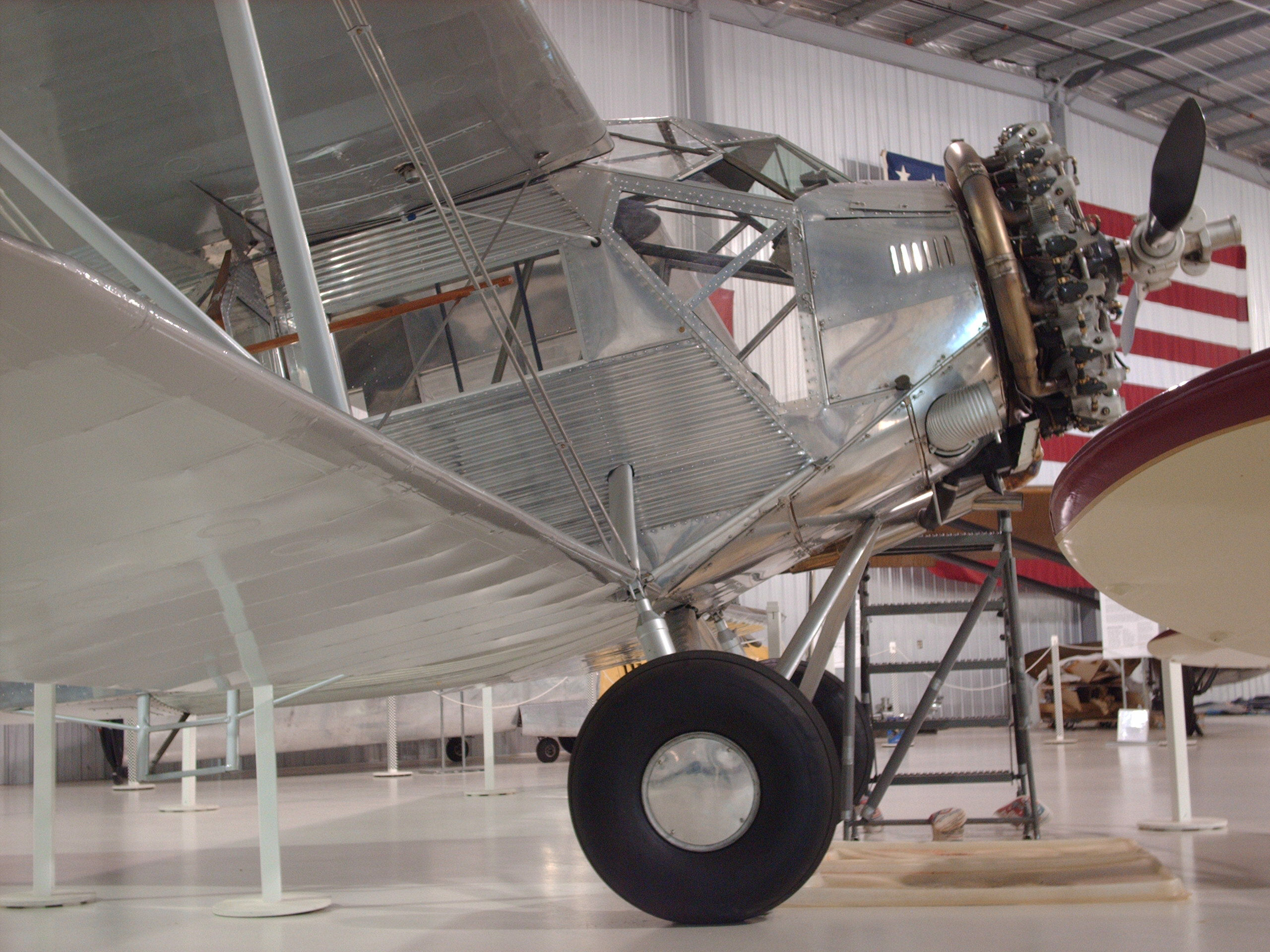
Cunningham-Hall PT-6F at the Golden Wings Museum

== Surviving aircraft ==
- PT-6F s/n 381 NC444, formerly NC16967 and NPC44 was restored to airworthy condition and as of 2008 at the Golden Wings Museum at Anoka County-Blaine Airport, near Minneapolis. As of 13 April 2024 is owned and operated by the Western Antique Aeroplane & Automobile Museum (WAAAM) in Hood River, Oregon.
- PT-6 s/n 2962 NC692W was restored to display-only status and cannot be flown, and is at the Alaska Museum of Transportation and Industry in Wasilla, Alaska and has been listed on the National Register of Historic Places.

== Specifications (Cunningham-Hall PT-6, ATC #177) ==
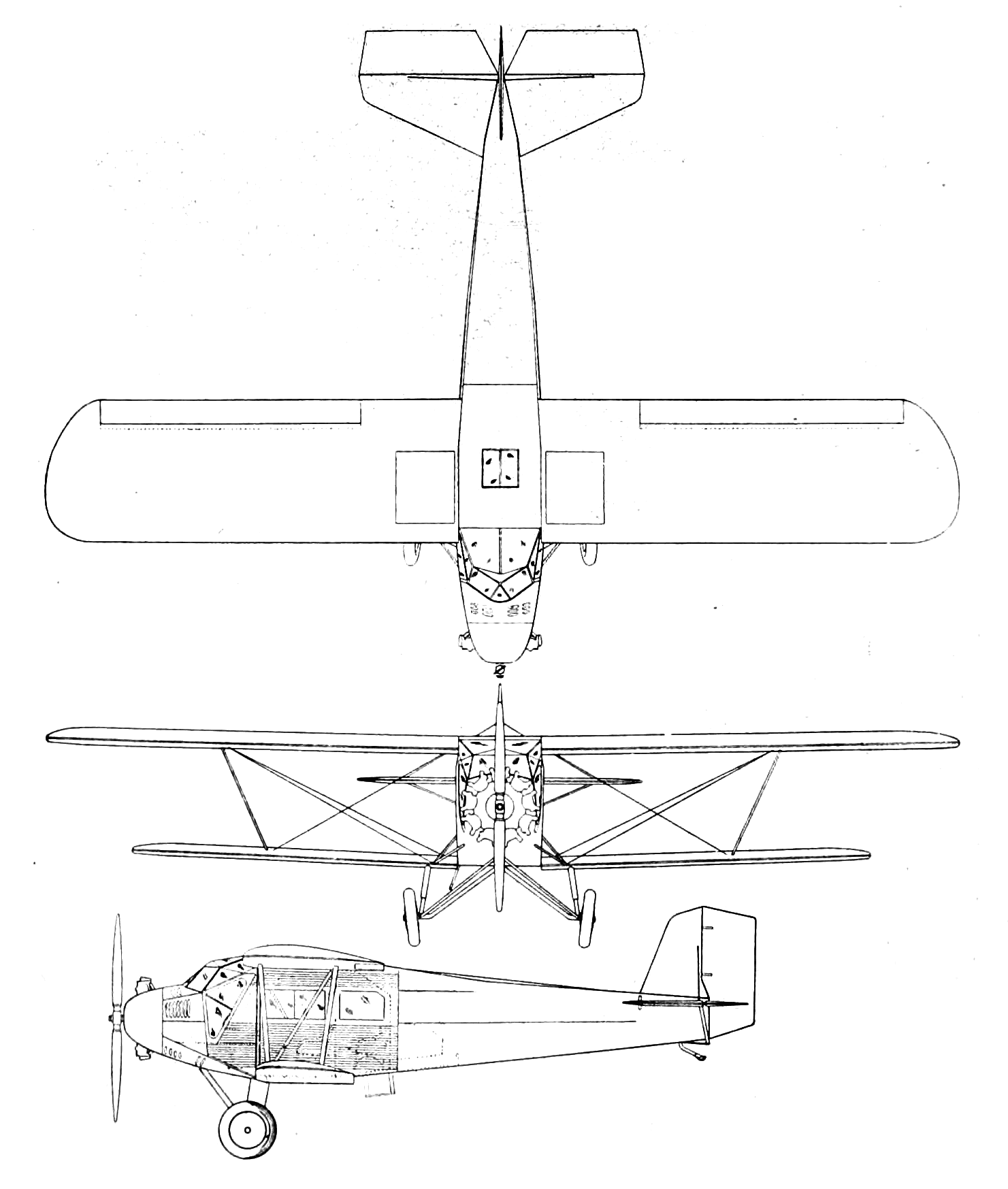
Cunningham-Hall PT-6 3-view drawing from Aero Digest, May 1929

Data from Aero Digest and Juptner

General characteristics

- Crew: Two
- Capacity: Four
- Length: 29 ft 8 in (9.04 m)
- Upper wingspan: 41 ft 8 in (12.70 m)
- Upper Chord: 78 in (2,000 mm)
- Lower wingspan: 33 ft 8 in (10.26 m)
- Lower Chord: 54 in (1,400 mm)
- Height: 9 ft 7 in (2.92 m)
- Wing area: 378 sq ft (35.1 m^{2})
- Airfoil: Clark Y
- Empty weight: 2,670 lb (1,211 kg)
- Gross weight: 4,350 lb (1,973 kg)
- Fuel capacity: 90 US gal (340 L; 75 imp gal)
- Oil capacity: 6 US gal (23 L; 5.0 imp gal)
- Powerplant: 1 × Wright J-6-9-300 Whirlwind 9 cylinder air-cooled radial engine, 300 hp (220 kW)
- Propellers: 2-bladed metal propeller. (Note: Built with fixed pitch props, later some were retrofitted with variable-pitch propellers)

Performance

- Maximum speed: 136 mph (219 km/h, 118 kn)
- Cruise speed: 115 mph (185 km/h, 100 kn)
- Stall speed: 40 mph (64 km/h, 35 kn)
- landing speed: 45 mph (72 km/h)
- Range: 690 mi (1,110 km, 600 nmi)
- Endurance: 6 hours
- Service ceiling: 17,500 ft (5,300 m)
- Rate of climb: 900 ft/min (4.6 m/s) initial rate
- Time to altitude:
  - 1.5 minutes to 2,000 ft (610 m)
  - 5 minutes to 6,000 ft (1,800 m)
- Wing loading: 10.5 lb/sq ft (51 kg/m^{2})
- Power/mass: 0.08 hp/lb (0.13 kW/kg)

== See also ==
- 1929 in aviation
