= Cunningham-Hall GA-21M =

American 1936 military training aircraft

GA-21M
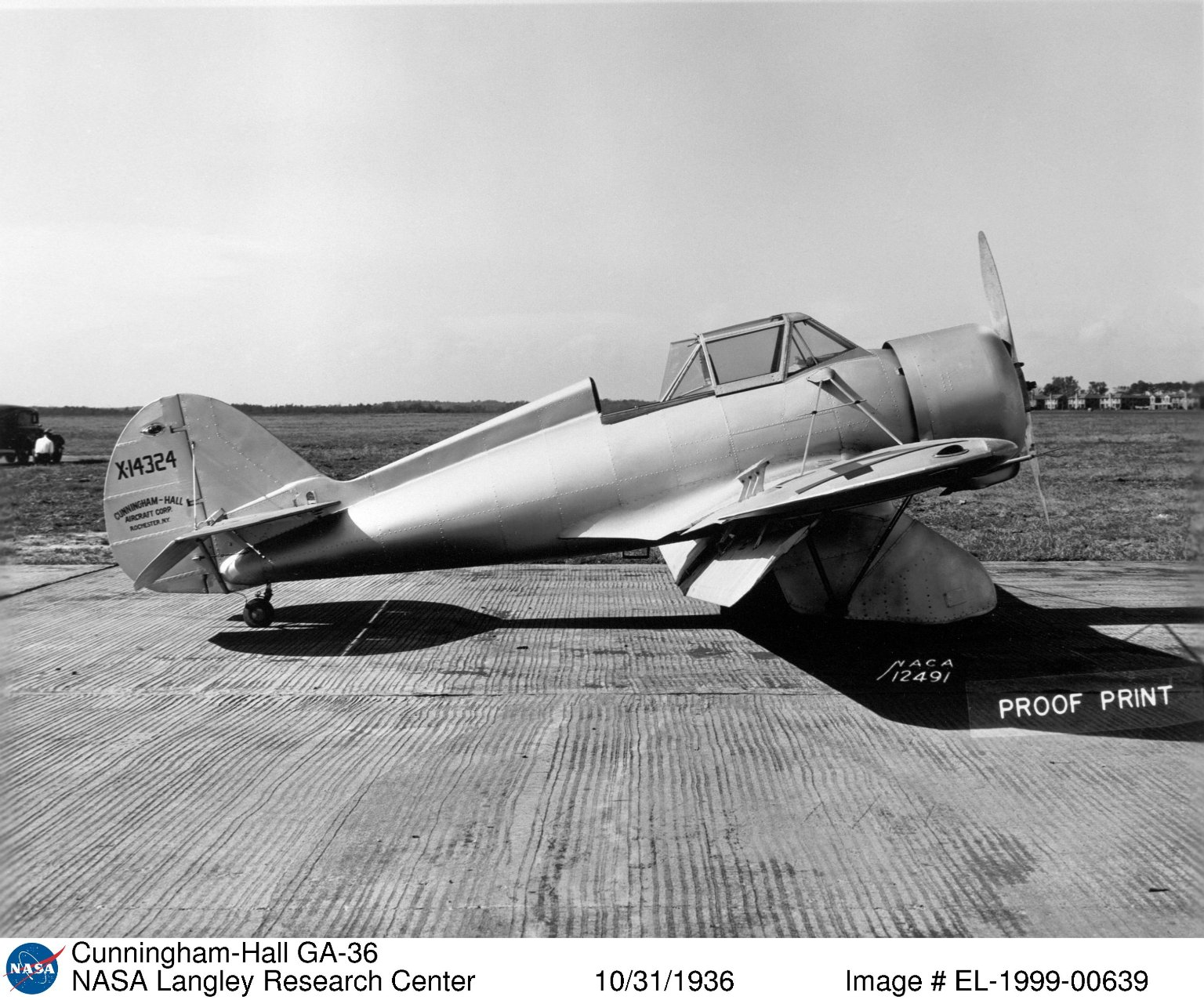
- Cunningham-Hall GA-36 tandem seat, military version of GA-21M.

General information
- Type: Sports monoplane
- National origin: United States
- Manufacturer: Cunningham-Hall Aircraft Corporation
- Designer: Randolph Hall
- Number built: 1

History
- First flight: 1934

The Cunningham-Hall GA-21 was an American two-seat monoplane design to compete for the Guggenheim Safe Aircraft Competition in 1934. Its distinguishing feature was full span flaps which could be manually or automatically adjusted. The GA-36 was a military version of it with tandem, rather than side-by-side seating.

== Design and development ==
The GA-21M was all metal aircraft apart from the fabric covering of parts of the wing, otherwise metal-covered, and the control surfaces. The low-set wings were rectangular in plan out to rounded tips and had a high lift section. Both flaps and ailerons filled the whole straight part of the trailing edge, so the latter only opened upwards.

Apart from its unusual flaps and lateral control the GA-21M was conventional. Powered by a 145 hp (108 kW), seven cylinder Warner Super Scarab radial engine, it had a round-sectioned, metal-skinned, monocoque fuselage. An open cockpit over the forward wing seated two side-by-side. The tailplane was mounted just above the fuselage on the fin and could be trimmed; essentially triangular in plan, it carried rounded elevators. A rounded rudder reached down to the keel.

The GA-21Ms had conventional, tailwheel landing gear with the landing wheels ahead of the leading edge within aircraft fairings that also enclosed the legs.

The GA-36 was a 1936 military trainer rebuild of the Ga-21M. This included a revised, tandem cockpit and more trouser-like landing gear fairings, making it 15% heavier.

The automated flaps worked well but were more complicated than, for example, Fowler flaps and more expensive to construct. Simpler systems were preferred and the sole GA-21M/36 was sold in 1941, stripped of major components and dumped until the 1980s when it was recovered, fully restored and put on display at the Niagara Aerospace Museum.

== Specifications (GA-36) ==
Data from Aero Digest, March 1937

General characteristics

- Crew: 2
- Length: 20 ft 0 in (6.10 m)
- Wingspan: 30 ft 0 in (9.14 m)
- Height: 6 ft 5 in (1.96 m)
- Wing area: 131 sq ft (12.2 m^{2})
- Empty weight: 1,490 lb (676 kg)
- Gross weight: 2,100 lb (953 kg)
- Fuel capacity: 29 US gal (24 imp gal; 110 L)
- Powerplant: 1 × Warner Super Scarab seven cylinder air-cooled radial piston engine, 145 hp (108 kW) at 2,050 rpm
- Propellers: 2-bladed Hamilton Standard, 8 ft (2.4 m) diameter

Performance

- Maximum speed: 158 mph (254 km/h, 137 kn)
- Cruise speed: 140 mph (230 km/h, 120 kn)
- Landing speed with-without flaps: 45–63 mph (72–101 km/h; 39–55 kn)
- Range: 450 mi (720 km, 390 nmi)
- Service ceiling: 14,000 ft (4,300 m)
- Rate of climb: 850 ft/min (4.3 m/s)
