= Oberlerchner Mg 23 =

Mg 23
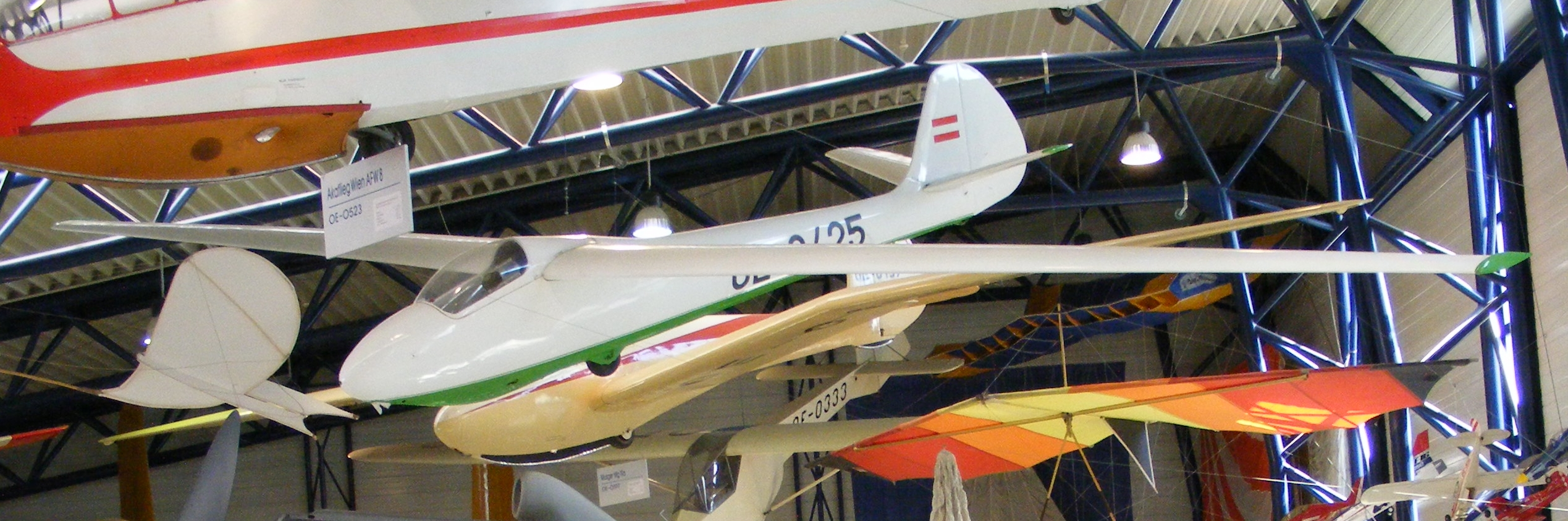
- Musger Mg 23 (OE-0425) at the Aviaticum museum

General information
- Type: Single seat high performance sailplane
- National origin: Austria
- Manufacturer: Josef Oberlerchner Holzindustrie, Spittal an der Drau
- Designer: Erwin Musger
- Number built: 26 by March 1966, including prototypes

History
- First flight: 25 June 1955 (Mg 23 prototype)

The Oberlerchner Mg 23 is a single-seat, all-wood, high-performance sailplane. It was built and first flown in Austria in 1955, and a total of 26 were built before production ended in 1965.

== Design and development ==
The Mg 23, an Erwin Musger design often known as the Musger Mg 23, was an all-wood shoulder-wing aircraft. Its wing had a straight leading edge, a constant-chord inner section with taper outboard and 2.5° of dihedral. The wingtips had small tip fences. It was built around a single wooden spar and was wood covered apart from the ailerons, which were fabric covered. Wooden Schempp-Hirth spoilers were fitted. The tail surfaces were fabric covered, the tailplane narrow in chord and straight tapered with a Flettner trim tab on the starboard elevator. One change between the prototype Mg 23 and the production Mg 23 SL was that the size of the fin and rudder was increased; on the SL the fin was straight-edged apart from a curved fuselage fillet but the trailing edge of the wide, deep rudder was rounded.

The fuselage had an oval section of wooden semi-monocoque construction, tapering to the rear. On the production SL the fuselage line over the wings merged into a forward-sliding canopy, which was longer than that of the prototype. The Mg 23 SL had a fixed monowheel undercarriage, and both integral nose- and tailskids.

The Mg 23 prototype flew on 25 June 1955, flight testing leading to the increase in vertical tail size and a modified canopy on the production aircraft, the first of which was flown on 1 April 1962.

== Operational history ==
26 Mg 23 SLs had been built by March 1966. In mid-2010, 11 Mg 23s were on the civil registers of European countries, nine in Austria, one in Switzerland and one in the Netherlands. Three were exported to the United States and one to Canada.

== Aircraft on display ==
An Mg 23, one of those still on the Austrian register, is on display in the Flugmuseum Aviaticum, Wiener Neustadt-Ost, Austria

- Western Antique Aeroplane & Automobile Museum Has a 1964 mg-23SL .

== Variants ==
Mg 23
Prototype, eight built.
Mg 23 SL
Production model, 18 built.

== Specifications (Mg 23) ==
Data from Jane's All the World's Aircraft 1966/7 and The World's Sailplanes:Die Segelflugzeuge der Welt:Les Planeurs du Monde.

General characteristics

- Crew: one
- Length: 7.11 m (23 ft 4 in) (Mg 23SL 7.22 m (23 ft 8 in)
- Wingspan: 16.40 m (53 ft 10 in)
- Height: 1.49 m (4 ft 11 in)
- Wing area: 14.21 m^{2} (153.0 sq ft)
- Aspect ratio: 18.54
- Airfoil: NACA63.015(Mg 23SL - NACA63 _{1}315)
- Empty weight: 240 kg (529 lb)
- Max takeoff weight: 360 kg (794 lb)

Performance

- Stall speed: 60 km/h (37 mph, 32 kn)
- Never exceed speed: 180 km/h (110 mph, 97 kn) smooth air (Mg 23SL - 220 km/h (137 mph; 119 kn)
- Rough air speed max: 130 km/h (81 mph; 70 kn)
- Aerotow speed: 130 km/h (81 mph; 70 kn)
- Winch launch speed: 80 km/h (50 mph; 43 kn)
- g limits: +4 at 216 km/h (134 mph; 117 kn)
- Maximum glide ratio: 32:1 at 79 km/h (49 mph; 43 kn)

33:1 at 85 km/h (53 mph; 46 kn)

- Rate of sink: 0.66 m/s (130 ft/min) minimum, at 68 km/h (42 mph; 37 kn)

(Mg 23SL 0.68 at 78 km/h (48 mph; 42 kn)

- Wing loading: 25.3 kg/m^{2} (5.2 lb/sq ft)
