= Leon D. Cuddeback =

American pilot

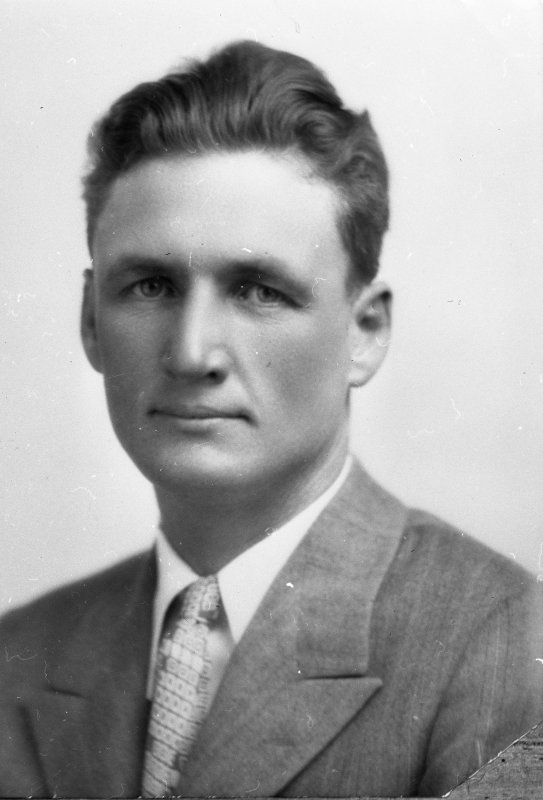
- Cuddeback, Leon
- Born: May 16, 1898; Colma, California
- Died: July 6, 1984 (aged 86); Walnut Creek, California
- Resting place: Cypress Lawn Memorial Park, Colma, California
- Occupation: Pilot
- Employer(s): Varney Air Lines, United Airlines; Civil Aeronautics Board

Leon Dewey "Lee" Cuddeback (May 16, 1898 – July 6, 1984) was an American pilot who worked for Varney Air Lines and United Airlines. He is most known for flying the first scheduled, civilian Air Mail (Contract Air Mail or CAM) flight in the United States on April 6, 1926.

== Personal life ==
Leon Cuddeback was the son of Moses Clinton Cuddeback and his third wife Cloa Kent-Irons (although Leon's death record list his mother's maiden name as Ford).

He married Lois Whittaker (1899-1969) on June 21, 1929. The couple had a daughter, Florence.

== First scheduled Air Mail flight ==
On April 6, 1926, Leon D. Cuddeback, chief pilot for Varney Air Lines, completed the first scheduled commercial air mail flight in a Curtiss-powered Swallow biplane. He took off from Pasco, Washington, had a stop in Boise, Idaho, and terminated in Elko, Nevada with $1,256 worth of stamped air mail. Because the start of the contract air mail system is considered the beginning of airline service, Cuddeback's flight is cited as the first U.S. airline flight, and is also celebrated as the "birthday" of United Airlines.

== Career ==
Cuddeback was a pilot for Varney Air Lines which eventually became United Airlines until 1938. He then joined the Civil Aeronautics Board until he left for service with the United Army Air Force in World War II. During the war, Cuddeback was an operations officer.

According to a history of the Directorate of Air Transport, Allied Air Force, South West Pacific Area and the 322nd Troop Carrier Wing:

[Leon]l Cuddeback is one of the true pioneers of civil aviation in the United States. He first learned to fly in 1921 at the Varney School of Flying, San Mateo, California. He worked as a mechanic and watchman for his training, and on becoming a pilot, flew for the school and became an instructor pilot. Finally he was chief pilot, supervising all flying instruction. Varney during this period was experimenting on running scheduled operations to determine the equipment and facilities necessary to operate airplanes on fixed schedules between cities, and to determine the costs of such operations. The only precedent at that time was the Army Air Mail Service. Cuddeback went to Central America for the Nicaragua Government to investigate routes for a civil airline for this country. Political conditions in Nicaragua put an end to this proposal. In 1925 Varney bid and won a contract with the U.S. Government to fly the mail on [the] Pasco, Washington to Elko, Nevada run by way of Boise, Idaho. The line was finally extended to Salt Lake City, Utah, Portland. Oregon, and Seattle, Washington. The organisation became incorporated in 1928 as Varney Airlines, and he was made Vice-President of the firm. In 1931 Varney merged with Boeing Airlines. The Colonel became Assistant Chief Pilot for Boeing. Around this time instrument flying and radio developed in aviation along with the carrying of passengers. In 1932 Boeing and several other airlines merged to form the United Airlines. Lt. Colonel Cuddeback was made Regional Superintendent of the old Varney route with his main office in Salt Lake City. Up to 1939 his division either won or was runner-up of the operational efficiency trophy for the United Airlines. In 1939 he went with the Government Safety Bureau of Civil Aviation Board as inspector in charge of Washington, Oregon, Idaho, and Montana.
In 1942 he was commissioned a Major direct in the U.S. Army as an air transportation specialist, and immediately assigned overseas to USASOS in the Transportation Corps. He arrived in Brisbane in May 1942 and transferred to DAT and Air Corps in May 1943. His Lieutenant Colonelcy was received in November 1943. He is entitled to wear service pilot's wings.

After the war, Cuddeback returned to the Civil Aeronautics Board and by 1949 became regional director for Washington, Oregon, Idaho, and Montana. He retired from the CAB in May 1963 as Chief Supervisory Air Safety Investigator in Oakland, California.

== Death and Legacy ==
He died in Walnut Creek, California in 1984.
