= International Automobile Company =

Defunct American motor vehicle manufacturer

International Automobile Company was a veteran era American automobile company.

== History ==
Founded in Charleston, West Virginia, in autumn 1899 with a capitalization of US$500,000, International's officers were H. A. La Paugh, Rebecca La Paugh, R. H. Hepner, D. B. Luckey, and J. Story, all from New York. Like many early American automobile companies, it is doubtful International actually built any cars.

== Sources ==
- Kimes, Beverly Rae. The Standard Catalog of American Cars, 1805-1942. Iola, Wisconsin: Krause Publications, 1989. ISBN 0-87341-111-0.
