= Stearman M-2 Speedmail =

1920's American Aircraft

M-2 Speedmail
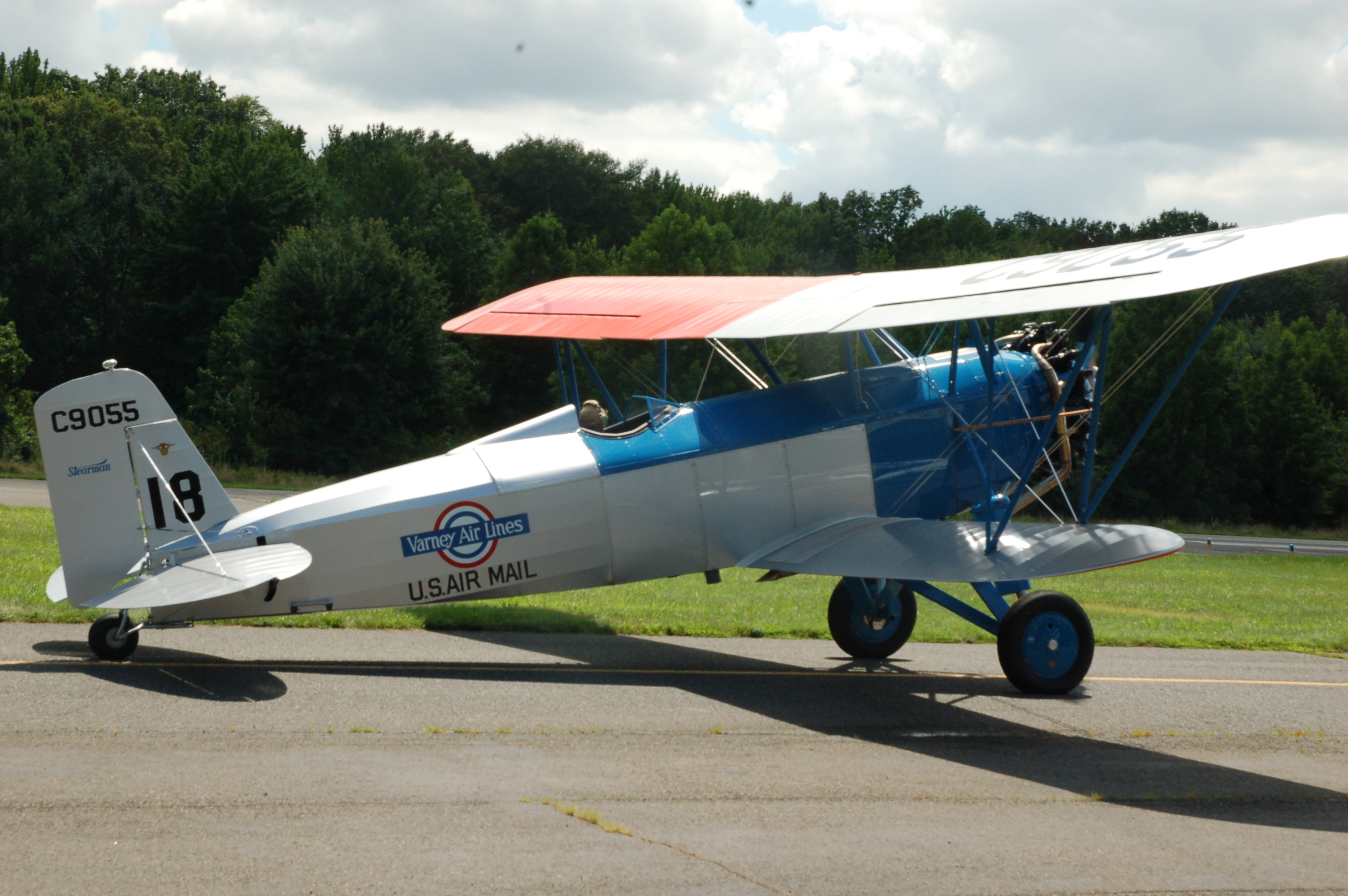
- The last surviving Stearman M-2 aircraft

General information
- Type: Mail carrier
- National origin: United States
- Manufacturer: Stearman Aircraft Company
- Designer: Lloyd Stearman
- Number built: 7

History
- First flight: 15 January 1929
- Developed into: Stearman LT-1

The Stearman M-2 Speedmail (nicknamed the Bull Stearman) was a mail-carrier aircraft produced by the Stearman Aircraft Company of Wichita, Kansas. It first flew in January 1929. The Speedmail was a single-seat biplane, with two large cargo compartments in place of a front cockpit. The fuselage and tail unit were constructed from welded chrome-moly steel tube faired with wooden formers and fabric covered aft of the pilot's cockpit, and detachable aluminium alloy panels covered the fuselage forward of the cockpit. The wings were constructed from spruce spars and plywood built-up ribs, all fabric covered. It differed from previous Stearman aircraft by having a tailwheel instead of a tailskid due to its size and weight.

== Design and development ==
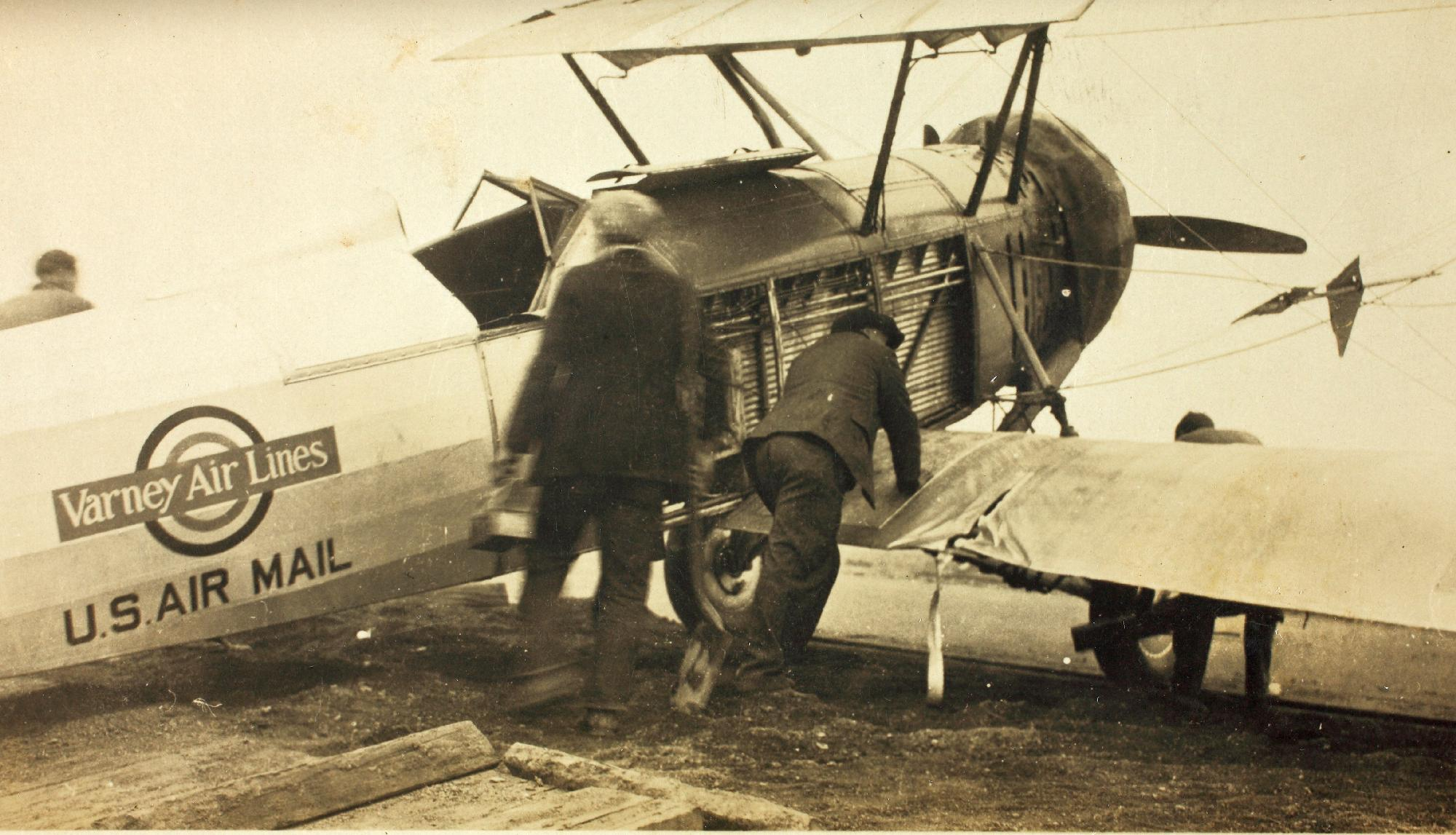
Varney Air Lines M-2 after accident exposing mail compartment

Lloyd Stearman and Mac Short, (Stearman's V.P. engineering), designed the Speedmail to the requirements of Varney Air Lines, which needed a new mail carrier with greater capacity to fly the Air Mail contracts they acquired from the U.S. Postal service while still being able to land on short, unimproved airstrips. This was achieved by using a new type of airfoil section, the Goettingen 398, allowing high lift at low speeds without affect the cruising speed. The result was a sturdy aircraft with a large cargo capacity.

To enable Interstate Air Lines to fly passengers on its Air Mail routes from Atlanta, Stearman enlarged the M-2, into the LT-1(Light Transport).The three aircraft produced for Interstate Air Lines could carry four passengers plus mail.

A further development was the CAB-1, "Stearman Coach", which was designed with an enclosed cabin for use as a business aircraft. However, only one was built.

== Operational history ==
Varney Air Lines' pilots found the M-2 difficult to handle and the Wright Cyclone engine was plagued with frequent maintenance issues. The sole surviving Stearman M-2 Speedmail is on display in the collection of the Western Antique Aeroplane & Automobile Museum in Hood River, Oregon, U.S.A.

== Variants ==
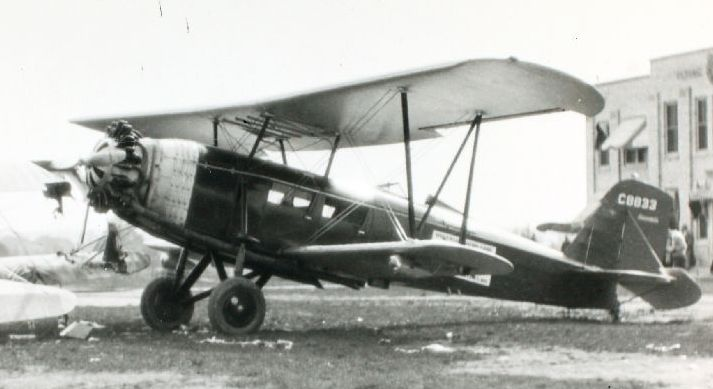
Interstate Airlines Stearman LT-1

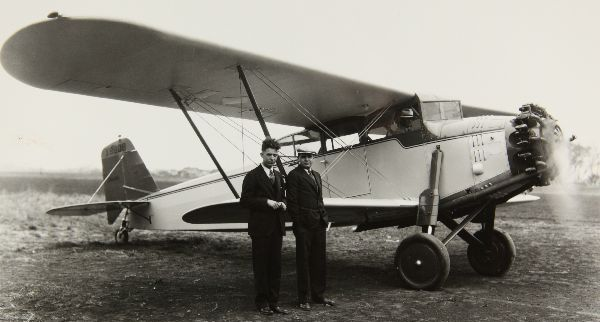
Stearman CAB-1 Coach

M-2 Speedmail
Single-engine mail transport aircraft, powered by a 525 hp (391 kW) Wright Cyclone radial engine, able to carry up to 1,000 lb (450 kg) of mail.
Stearman LT-1
Slightly larger 5-seat passenger and mail carrier, powered by a Pratt & Whitney Hornet radial piston engine.
CAB-1 Coach
Similar to the M-2 with enclosed cockpit filling gap between the fuselage and wing and powered with a 300 hp (220 kW) Wright J-6-9.

== Operators ==
United States

- Varney Air Lines

== Specifications (M-2 Speedmail) ==
Data from Specifications of American Commercial Airplanes

General characteristics

- Crew: 1
- Capacity: 1,000 lb (450 kg) payload
- Length: 30 ft 2 in (9.19 m)
- Wingspan: 46 ft 0 in (14.02 m)
- Height: 11 ft 1 in (3.38 m)
- Wing area: 436 sq ft (40.5 m^{2})
- Empty weight: 3,442 lb (1,561 kg)
- Gross weight: 5,578 lb (2,530 kg)
- Fuel capacity: 136 US gal (510 L; 113 imp gal)
- Powerplant: 1 × Wright Cyclone nine-cylinder radial engine, 525 hp (391 kW)

Performance

- Maximum speed: 147 mph (237 km/h, 128 kn)
- Cruise speed: 126 mph (203 km/h, 109 kn)
- Range: 860 mi (1,380 km, 750 nmi)
- Service ceiling: 15,000 ft (4,600 m)
- Rate of climb: 950 ft/min (4.8 m/s)

== See also ==
Related development

- Stearman 4
- Stearman LT-1

Aircraft of comparable role, configuration, and era

- Boeing Model 40
