= Varney Air Lines =

American domestic airline based in Boise, Idaho (1926–34)

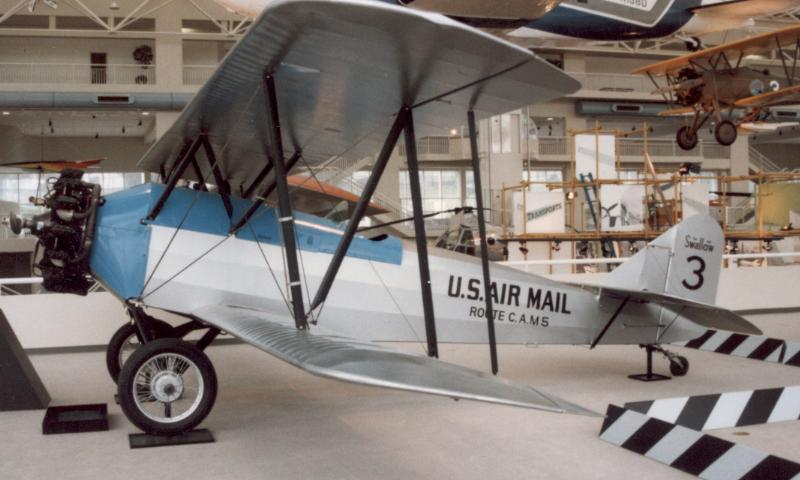
- Swallow J-5 built 1924 with markings of CAM 5 as operated by Varney Airlines—displayed at the Museum of Flight, Boeing Field, Seattle, May 1989
- Commenced operations: April 6, 1926; 100 years ago (as Varney Air Lines); May 1934; 92 years ago (as Varney Speed Lines)
- Ceased operations: March 28, 1931; 95 years ago (renamed United Airlines); July 8, 1937; 88 years ago (renamed Continental Airlines)
- Operating bases: Boise, Idaho, United States
- Parent company: United Airlines
- Founder: Walter Varney

Varney Air Lines was an American airline company that started service on April 6, 1926, as an airmail carrier. Formed by Walter Varney, the airline was based in Boise, Idaho, United States. The airline is one of the predecessors of United Airlines.

== Historical background ==
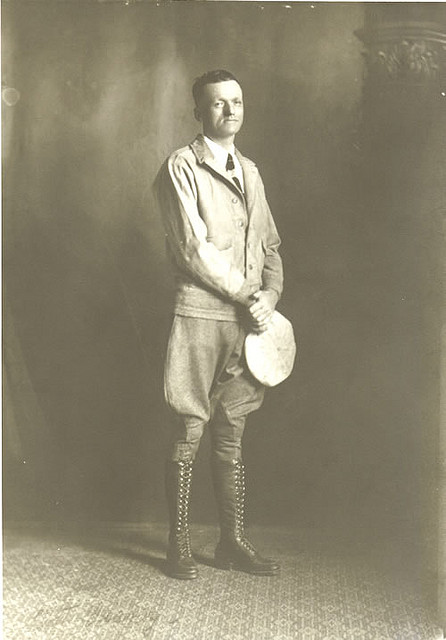
Walter T. Varney, founder of predecessors of Continental Airlines and United Airlines, 1921

On February 2, 1925, US President Coolidge had signed into law, after passage by the Congress, HR 7064, "An Act to Encourage Commercial Aviation and to Authorize the Postmaster General to Contract for Air Mail Service", more commonly known as The Kelly Act, which directed the US Post Office Department to contract with private airlines to carry the mail over designated routes many of which connected with the Government operated Transcontinental Air Mail route between New York and San Francisco. Varney won the contract for CAM-5 as the only bidder. Its first flight under contract with the USPOD was from Pasco, Washington to Elko, Nevada with an intermediate stop in Boise. That air freight contract grew into the birth of one of the world's biggest airlines.

== First flight ==
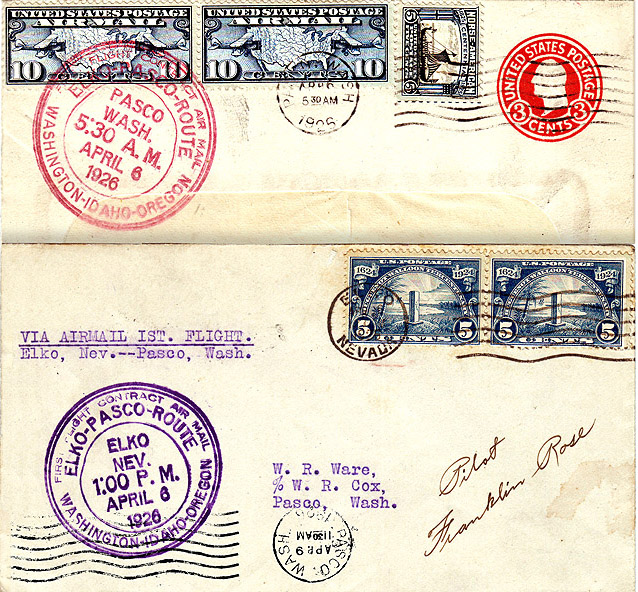
Covers flown on the first flights eastbound and westbound over CAM-5

On April 9, 1926, Pilot Leon D. Cuddeback flew the first eastbound CAM-5 flight, leaving in the early dawn hours from Pasco.

== Later history ==
Varney added a Breese-Wilde Model 5 and replaced its original Swallows with Stearman C3s and thereafter upgraded as new equipment became available. Subsequent aircraft included the larger Stearman M-2 Speedmail and the Boeing Model 40 dedicated mail planes, and finally the more modern Boeing 247 twin-engine monoplane. Arriving in 1933, the 247 greatly expanded Varney's ability to carry passengers as well as mail.

Varney soon added Salt Lake City, Portland, and Seattle to its route.

In 1930, Varney was acquired by United Aircraft and Transport Corporation, itself formed by a merger of Boeing and Pratt & Whitney Aircraft, and folded into its airlines group along with the other acquired airlines: Pacific Air Transport, Boeing, and National Air Transport.

In 1934, the Air Mail scandal resulted in the passage of the Air Mail Act which forbade aircraft manufacturers from operating airlines. As a result, United Aircraft and Transport Corporation was broken up. The airlines group became United Airlines. Since Varney was a part of United, the founding year of United is 1926, and making United the oldest commercial airline in the United States.

=== Continental Airlines ===
Following cancellation of all domestic airmail contracts by the Roosevelt administration in 1934, Robert F. Six learned of an opportunity to buy into the Southwest Division of Varney Speed Lines which needed money to handle its newly acquired Pueblo-El Paso route. Six was introduced to Louis Mueller, who had helped found the Southwest Division of Varney in 1934, and bought into the airline with US$90,000 becoming general manager on July 5, 1936. The carrier was renamed Continental Air Lines (later changed to "Airlines") on July 8, 1937. Six changed the name to "Continental" because he wanted the airline name to reflect his desire to have the airline fly all directions throughout the United States. Decades later, in 2010, United (the direct successor to Varney) would merge with Continental as well.

== See also ==
- List of companies based in Idaho
- List of defunct airlines of the United States
- Swan Island Municipal Airport
- United States airmail service
