= Stearman LT-1 =

LT-1
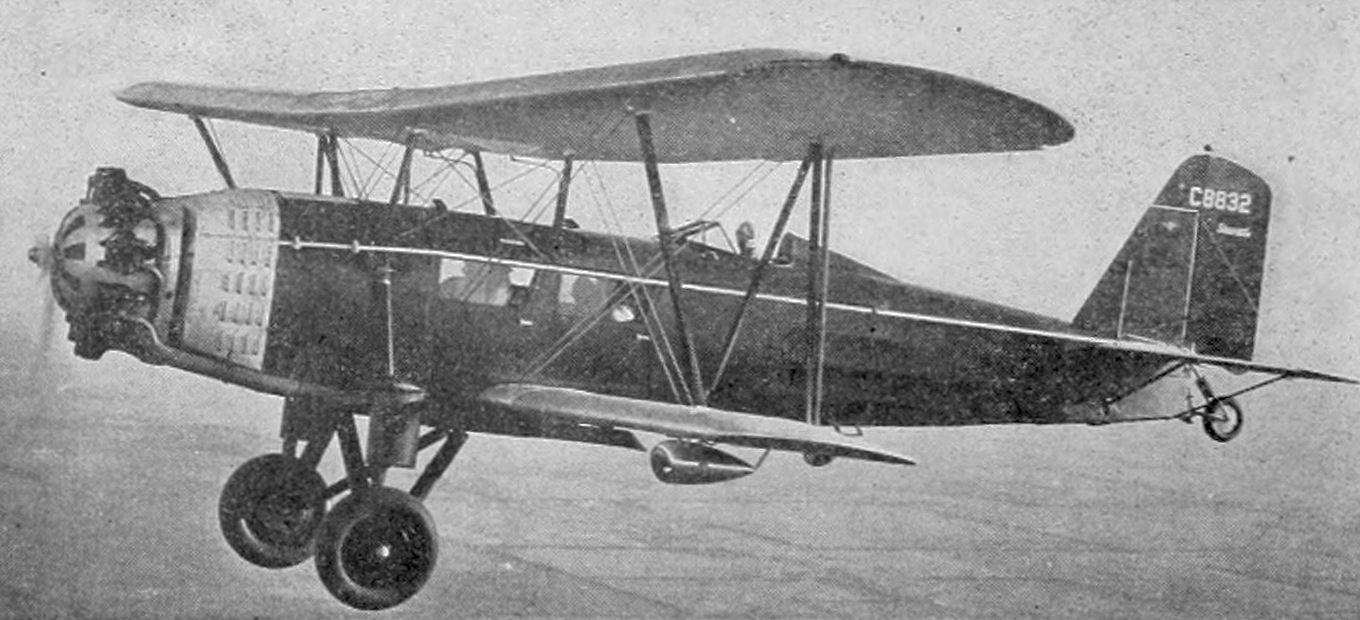

General information
- Type: light transport biplane
- National origin: United States
- Manufacturer: Stearman Aircraft Company
- Number built: 3

History
- Developed from: Stearman M-2 Speedmail

The Stearman LT-1 (Light Transport-1) was a late 1920s American biplane, carrying four passengers plus mail.

== Design and development ==
The LT-1 was a slightly enlarged version of the Stearman M-2 Speedmail with four passengers in an enclosed cabin and space for 500 lb (230 kg) of mail. It was an unequal span, single bay biplane, its lower span only 70% that of the upper and with only 40% of its area. The wings were built around twin spars so, because of the narrower chord of the lower wings, the leading members of the N-form interplane struts which joined the wing spars leaned forward. Both upper and lower wings were set with 2° of dihedral and both carried ailerons, which were externally interconnected. Navigation and landing lights, the latter in streamlined underwing housings, were standard.

The LT-1 was powered by a 525 hp (391 kW) Pratt & Whitney Hornet radial engine, nose-mounted with its nine cylinderheads exposed for cooling. Behind the engine there was a mail compartment and behind that a windowed cabin seated four passengers, provided with airspeed meter, altimeter and map box. Its pilot had an open cockpit with windscreen and streamlined headrest built into the rounded upper fuselage decking.

Its tail was conventional, with a tailplane mounted on top of the fuselage and a cropped triangular fin with a rather angular balanced rudder.

The undercarriage was also conventional, though with a tail wheel rather than a skid. Its mainwheels were on split axles and rearward drag struts, both mounted centrally on the fuselage underside, with vertical shock-absorbing legs.

== Operational history ==
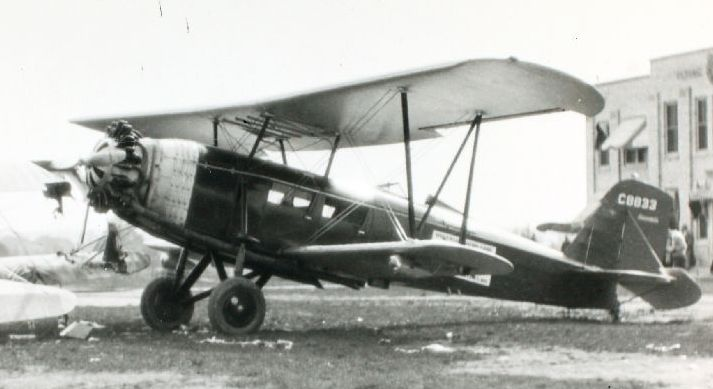
Stearman LT-1 of Interstate Airlines

The date of the LT-1's first flight is not known but it was certificated in 1929. The prototype was destroyed not long after its first flight by a wind storm. At least one was used by Interstate Airlines until 1934, after which it operated in China.

== Specifications ==
Data from Aero Digest (September 1929)

General characteristics

- Crew: one
- Capacity: four passengers
- Length: 32 ft 9 in (9.98 m)
- Upper wingspan: 49 ft (15 m)
- Lower wingspan: 34 ft 6 in (10.52 m)
- Wing area: 347 sq ft (32.2 m^{2}) upper wing, 143 sq ft (13.3 m^{2})
- Empty weight: 3,932 lb (1,784 kg)
- Gross weight: 6,500 lb (2,948 kg) <bk/>
- Payload: 1,500 lb (680 kg)
- Fuel capacity: 146 US gal (122 imp gal; 550 L)
- Powerplant: 1 × Pratt & Whitney Hornet nine cylinder radial, 525 hp (391 kW)

Performance

- Maximum speed: 140 mph (230 km/h, 120 kn)
- Cruise speed: 115 mph (185 km/h, 100 kn) <bk/>
- Landing speed: 50 mph (80 km/h; 43 kn)
- Range: 770 mi (1,240 km, 670 nmi)
- Service ceiling: 18,000 ft (5,500 m)
- Rate of climb: 900 ft/min (4.6 m/s)

== See also ==
Related development

- Stearman M-2 Speedmail
