= Cunningham-Hall Aircraft Corporation =

American aircraft manufacturer

- Founded: 1928; 97 years ago in Rochester, New York, United States
- Founder: Randolph F. Hall, James Cunningham
- Defunct: 1948; 77 years ago
- Fate: dissolved
- Headquarters: Rochester, New York, United States
- Products: aircraft

The Cunningham-Hall Aircraft Corporation was an American aircraft manufacturer from its formation in 1928 to its closure in 1948.

== History ==
The company was formed in 1928 at Rochester, New York. It was a combination of Randolph F. Hall, as vice president, some former employees of Thomas-Morse Aircraft Corporation and James Cunningham, Son and Company who manufactured motor cars. Francis E. Cunningham was President. The company built five different aircraft designs, most were only built in single numbers or no more than prototypes. The last design appeared in 1937 and the company concentrated on sub-contract component production before it was dissolved in 1948.

== Aircraft designs ==
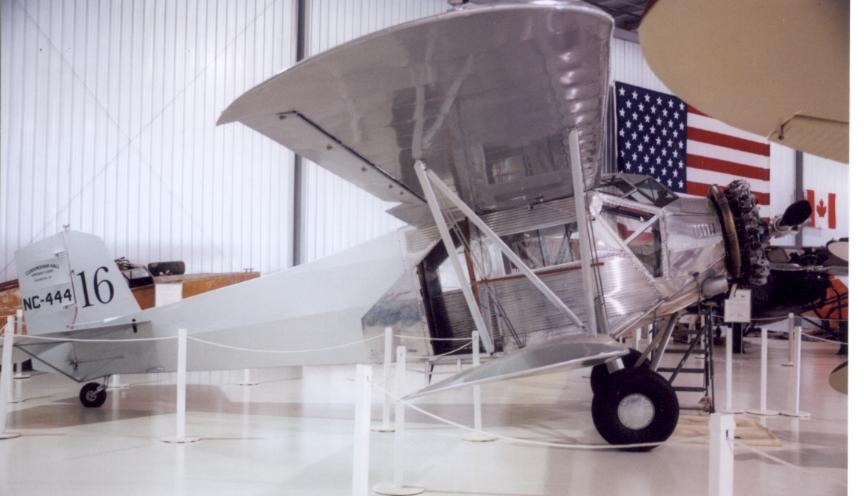
Cunningham-Hall PT-6F freighter preserved in a collection in Minnesota in 2006

- Cunningham-Hall PT-6
- Cunningham-Hall X-89 "Mystery Ship" Biplane, with small-chord upper wing.
- Cunningham-Hall X-90
- Cunningham-Hall GA-21M

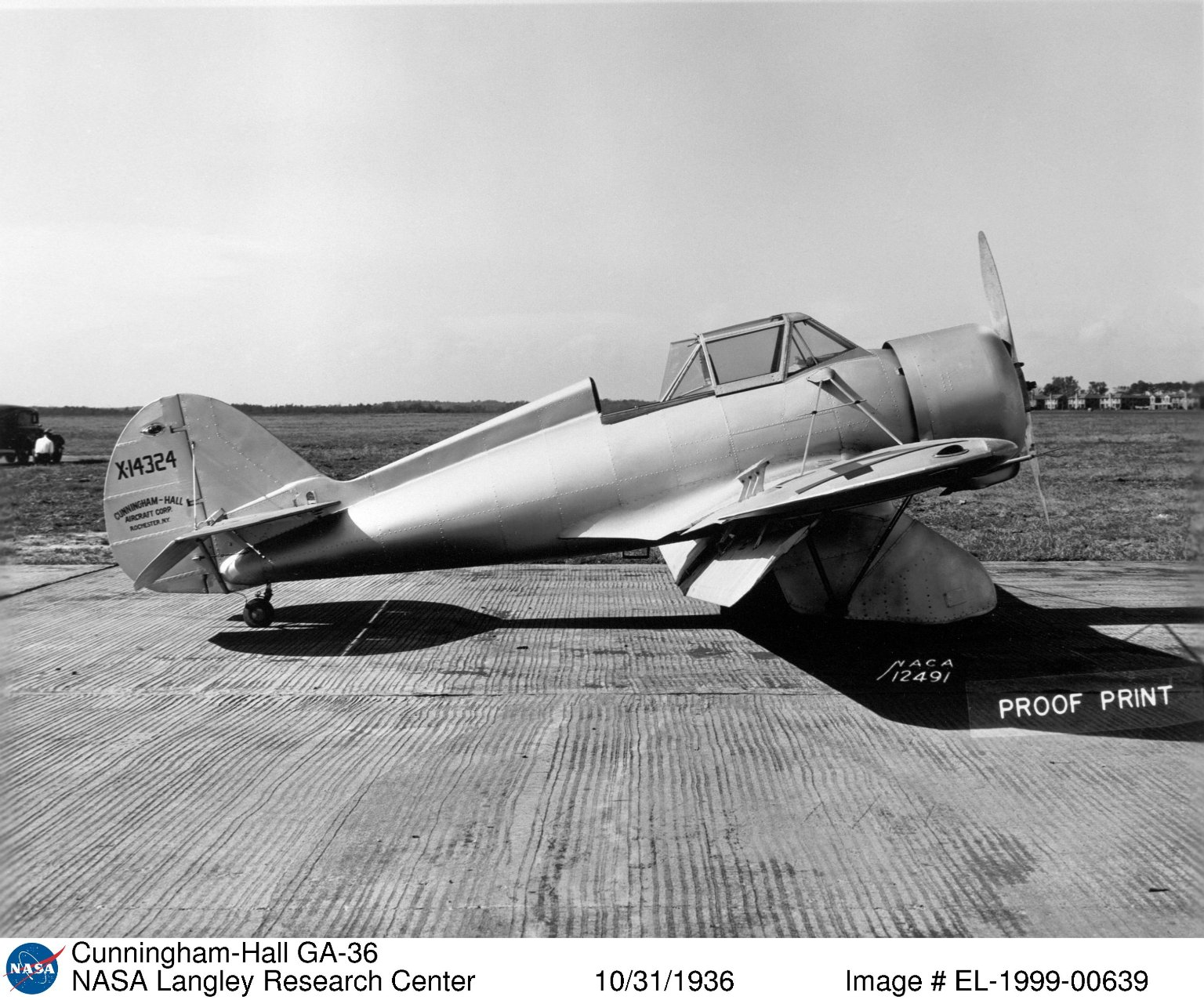
Cunningham-Hall GA-36 at Langley

- Cunningham-Hall GA-36
- Cunningham-Hall PT-6F

== See also ==
- Cunningham automobile
