= Inland Sport =

S-300 Sport
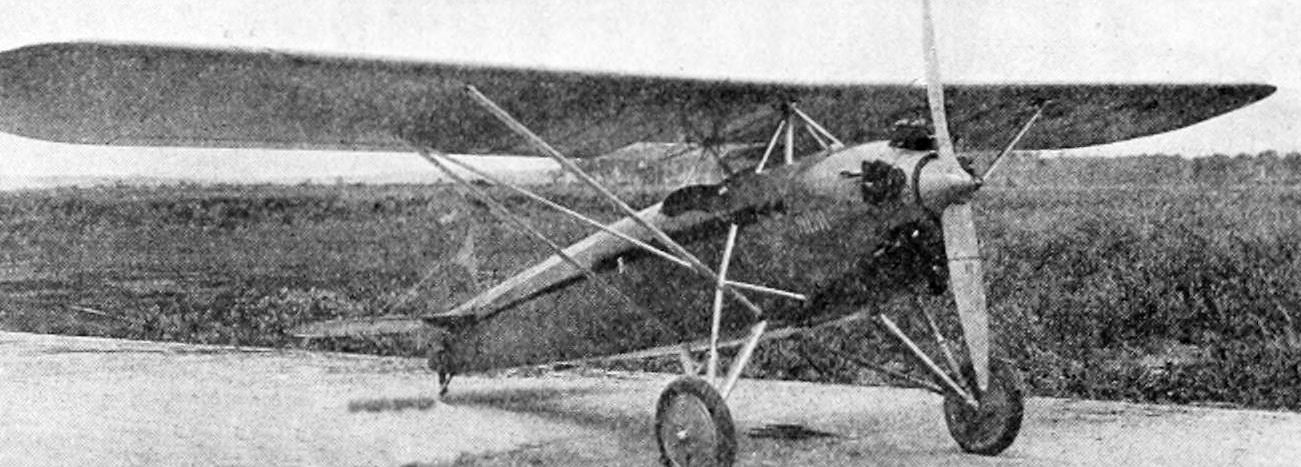

General information
- Type: Sport and training two-seater
- National origin: U.S.
- Manufacturer: Inland Aviation Co.
- Designer: Dewey Bonbrake
- Number built: 34

History
- First flight: 19 July 1928
- Developed from: Bahl Lark and Bonbrake Parasol

The Inland Sport series of parasol wing, sport and training side-by-side two seaters, introduced between 1928 and 1930, differed chiefly in their engines. They used three different radial engines, more than doubling the Sport's power over two years of development. 34 examples were built and frequently re-engined.

== Design and development ==
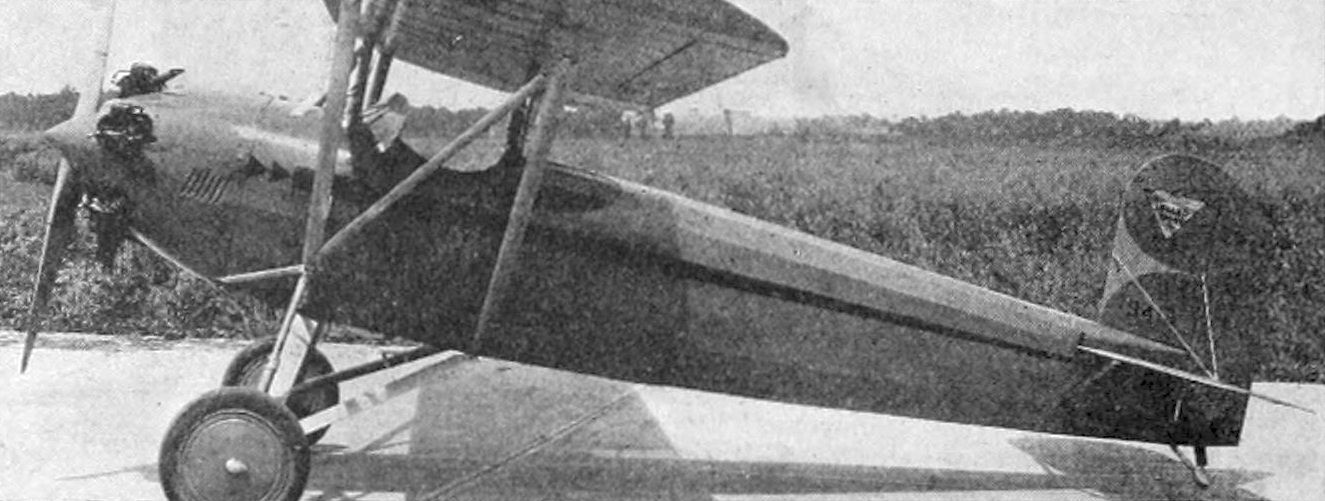
S-300 Sport

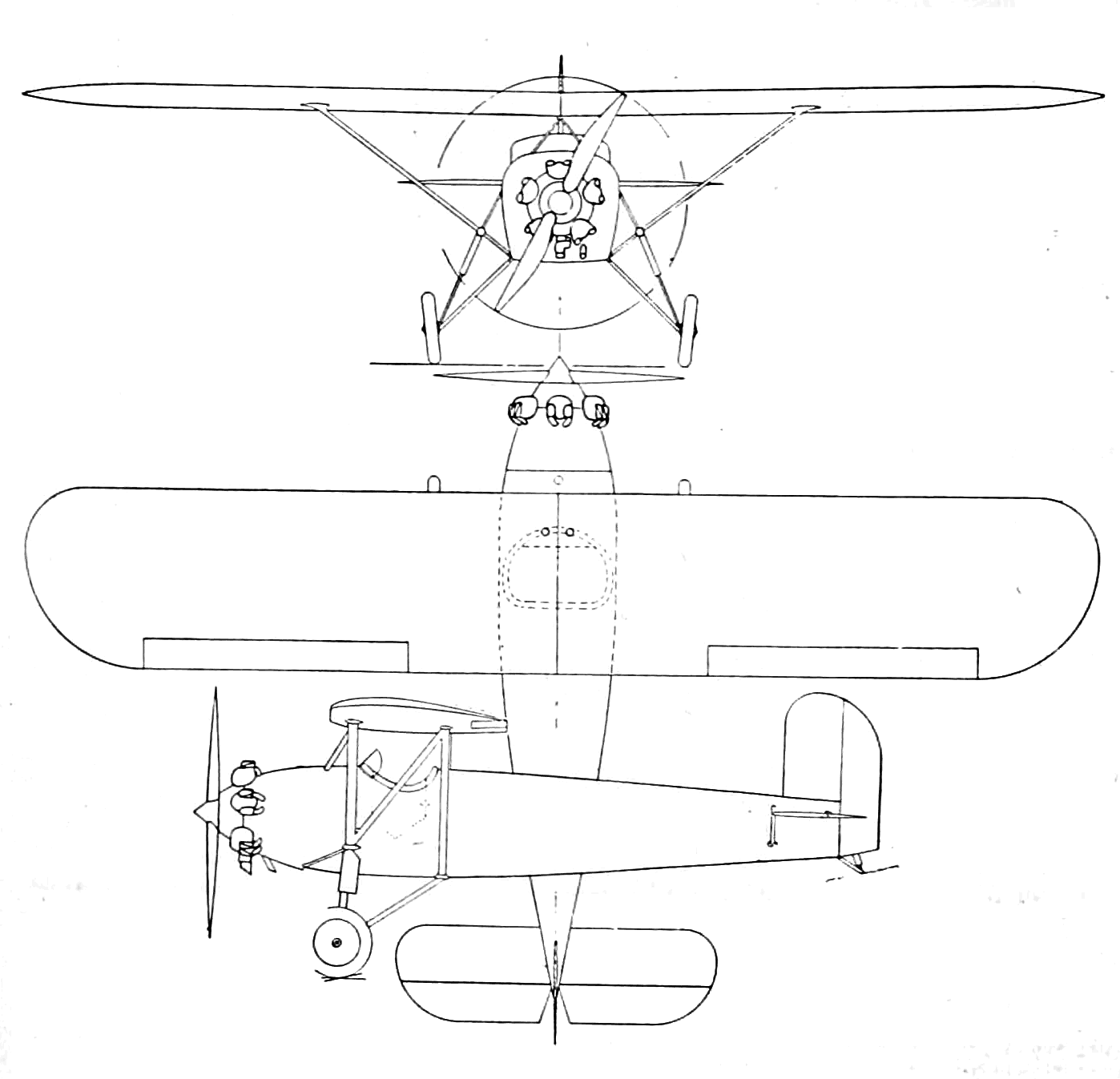
S-300 Sport

Before joining Inland Aviation Co., founded in 1928, Dewey Bonbrake had designed and built his Bonbrake Parasol, based on the Bahl Lark. Almost all of his designs for Inland were variations on the former. These were 30 ft (9.1 m) span, parasol wing monoplanes with side-by-side open cockpit seating for two, designed to be powered by a range of five or seven cylinder radial engines.

The wing was a two spar structure, rectangular in plan out to rounded tips. The spars were wooden (spruce) but the ribs metal (duralumin). Chrome-molybdenum steel, N-form struts from the spars attached the wing to the lower fuselage, assisted centrally by a short cabane. Chrome-molybdenum steel was used structurally throughout the rest of the airframe, including the differential ailerons.

The engine was nose-mounted was mounted with its cylinders exposed for cooling. The first prototype, the S-100, was powered by a five cylinder, 55 hp (41 kW) Velie M-5. As more powerful and heavier engines were used in later variants the nose length decreased to maintain trim. Behind the engine the Sport's fuselage was based on a welded structure and was flat-sided with rounded decking. Its open, side-by-side cockpit was under the wing, limiting the upward view but improving tutor to pupil communication, with a large luggage compartment behind it. Its tail was conventional with a straight-edged, rounded-tipped tailplane, mounted on top of the fuselage structure and braced to the lower longerons, which carried elevators of similar plan apart from cut-outs for rudder movement. Its pilot could trim the Sport in flight by adjusting the tailplane angle of incidence. The vertical tail was also rectangular in profile out to a rounded top. The rudder reached to the keel, where a short tailskid attached to it assisted ground manoeuvrability.

The Sport's main undercarriage was fixed and of wide track, with the wheels on separate axles mounted on the lower fuselage longerons, as were the drag struts. Legs, including oleo struts, were mounted on the forward wing struts at points reinforced by short struts to the upper and lower longerons.

== Operational history ==
Between 1928 and 1930 six Sport models appeared, differing chiefly in their engine power which ranged from 55 to 145 hp (41 to 108 kW) delivered by three different engine types, each with their own variants. In all 34 were built and at least nine had at least two different engines during their lives. The most powerful Sport variant, the sole W-600 Super Sport fitted with a 145 hp (108 kW) Warner Scarab, was destroyed during a test flight.

Inland Aircraft were declared bankrupt in 1932.

== Variants ==
Data from aerofiles: Inland

All variants had 30 ft (9.1 m) span wings and lengths between 19 ft 4 in (5.89 m) and 19 ft 10 in (6.05 m).

S-100
Five cylinder, 55 hp (41 kW) Velie M-5. Prototype, one built.(1928)
S-200
As S-100 but 70 hp (52 kW) Velie M-5. One conversion.(1928)
S-300 Sport
Five cylinder 65 hp (48 kW) LeBlond 5D. 17 built.(1929)
S-300-E Sport
70 hp (52 kW) LeBlond 5DE. Five conversions.(1929)
S-300-DF Sport
80 hp (60 kW) LeBlond 5DF. One conversion. (1930)
S-400
Seven cylinder 110 hp (82 kW) Warner Scarab. One built, prototype for W-500.(1930)
R-400 Sportster
90 hp (67 kW) Warner Scarab. Nine built. (1930)
W-500 Super Sport
110 hp (82 kW) Warner Scarab. Five built, plus two conversions.(1930)
W-600 Super Sport
145 hp (108 kW) Warner Scarab. One built.(1930)

== Specifications (S-300-E) ==
Data from Aero Digest September 1929 except where noted.

General characteristics

- Crew: One pilot
- Capacity: one student or passenger
- Length: 19 ft 1 in (5.82 m)
- Wingspan: 30 ft (9.1 m)
- Empty weight: 680 lb (308 kg)
- Gross weight: 1,185 lb (538 kg)
- Payload: 505 lb (229 kg)
- Fuel capacity: 25 US gal (21 imp gal; 95 L)
- Powerplant: 1 × LeBlond 5DE five cylinder radial, 70 hp (52 kW)
- Propellers: 2-bladed

Performance

- Maximum speed: 110 mph (180 km/h, 96 kn)
- Cruise speed: 95 mph (153 km/h, 83 kn)
- Landing speed: 39 mph (63 km/h; 34 kn)
- Range: 500 mi (800 km, 430 nmi)
