= Command-Aire 3C3 =

American 1928 three-seat utility biplane

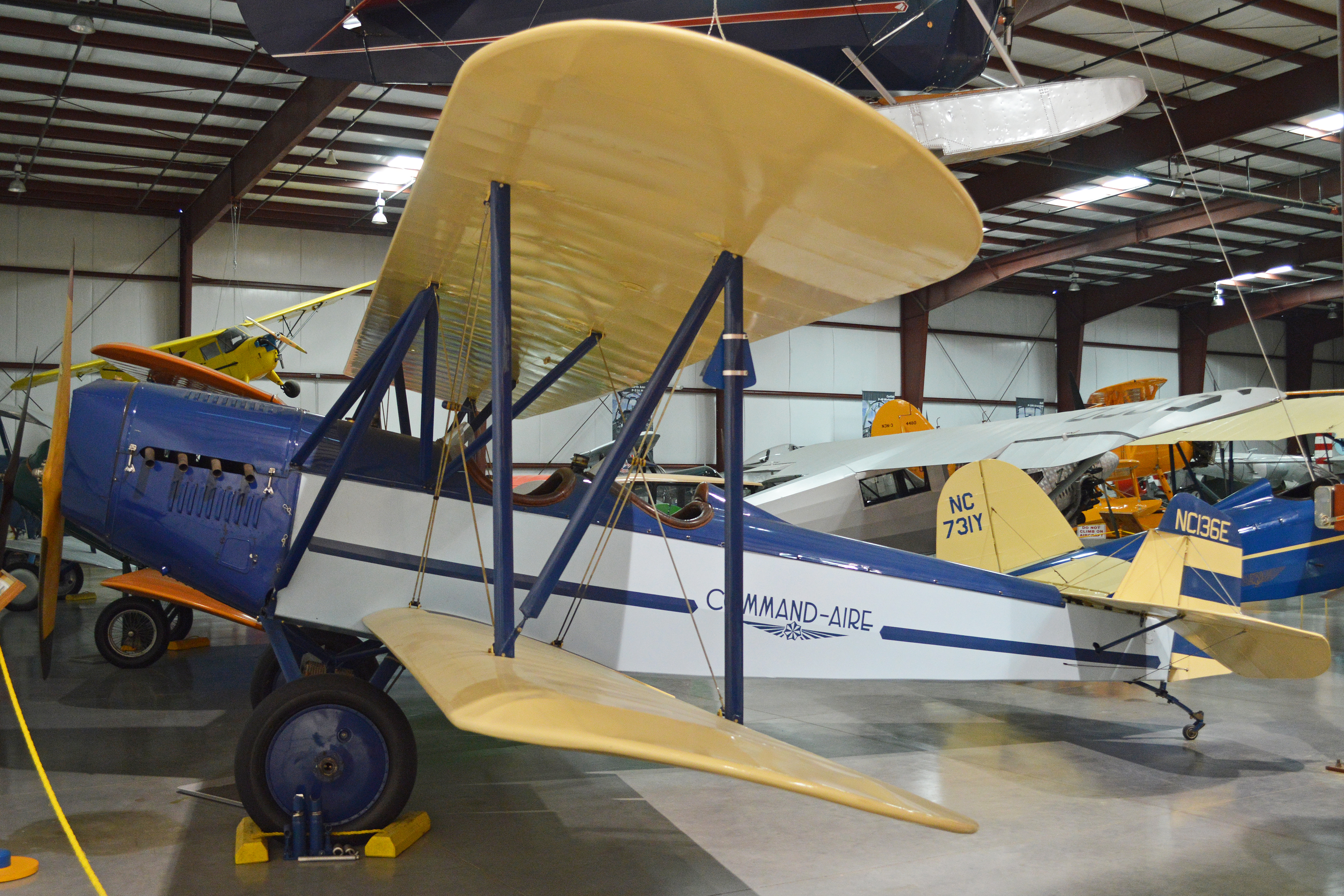

General information
- Type: Utility sport and training biplane
- National origin: United States
- Manufacturer: Command-Aire
- Designer: Morton Cronk and Albert Vollmecke
- Status: retired
- Primary user: Curtiss Flying Service
- Number built: 184-254 (total for 3C3, 4C3, 5C3, BS-14 and BS-16) (Note: Sources disagree on how many were built. The FAA issued 251 registrations to 251 unique serial numbers, with three separate batches - s/n 1 for the prototype, 500-655, and W-51 to W-145 of serial numbers. Vollmecke claimed 184 of all types had been built based on his personal archives, however this number would include a DFS 38 monoplane training glider built by the kids hanging around the factory, and the Little Rocket racer, while it may exclude any aircraft built before the company was renamed - however, this was not a large number. Some airframes may have had multiple serials numbers and registrations, but this cannot account for such a large discrepancy either.)

History
- Manufactured: 1928–1931
- Introduction date: July 1928 (date certified)
- First flight: January 1928

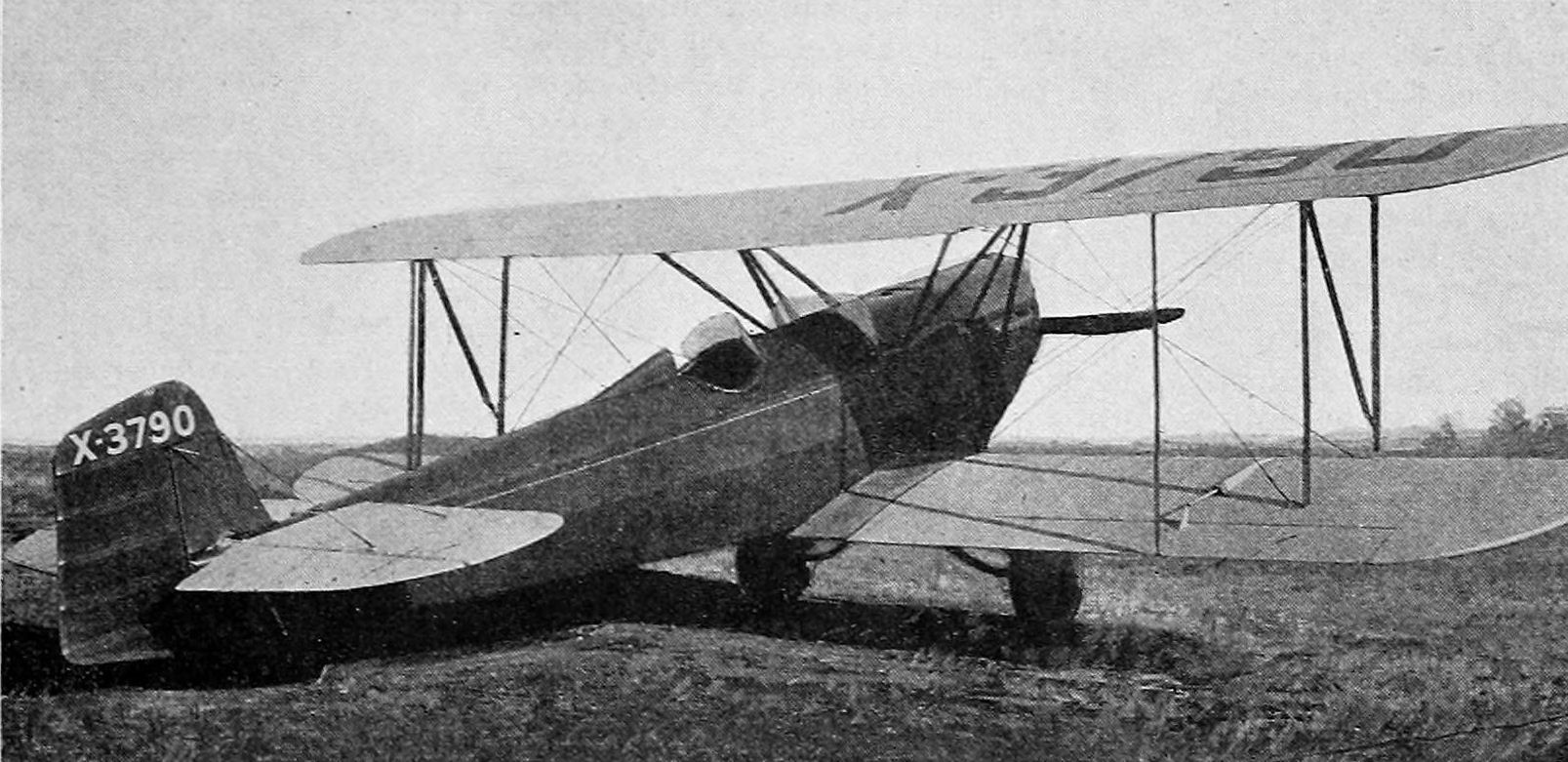
Command Aire 3C3 prototype from Aero Digest, February 1928

The Command-Aire 3C3 and similar 4C3 and 5C3 are American three-seat open cockpit utility, training and touring biplanes developed by Command-Aire in the late 1920s and early 1930s.

== Design and development ==
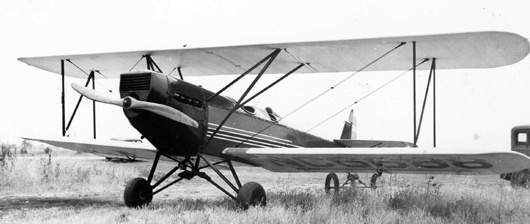
Command-Aire 3C3 showing salient characteristics, including triangulated cabane that was simplified on later models

The Command-Aire did not at first appear to offer much of an advancement over the vast multitude of three seat biplanes built around the ubiquitous Curtiss OX-5 engine to similar designs, with similar dimensions and construction methods, many of which were already in production. Indeed, the OX-5 era was coming to an end. The vast quantities of war-surplus engines, which had swamped the market in the immediate post-war period, were running low. Only by the smaller details can it be distinguished from its brethren. The basic design was by Morton Cronk, and although it had excellent high altitude capabilities, it was slow. This setback nearly foundered the company before its first aircraft entered production.

The design's proportions were good, but Cronk's departure left the company without an engineer. It happened to be that Albert Vollmecke, a Heinkel engineer was in the US attempting to find a customer to build Heinkel HD 40 mailplanes under licence for the US market. Seeing that there was little prospect of any sales in the US, he decided to hire on with an American company, and Command-Aire lucked out. His first task was to rework the design to provide documentation for the new approval process. While there was only one major visible external difference, he undertook an extensive redesign based on his experience in the much more scientifically grounded German aviation industry, and to bring the design into line with CAA (now FAA) certification requirements, which involved a lot of submissions, and alterations, and resubmissions before they signed off on it. Many parts had to be redesigned when it was easier to redo the design, than to use the existing design to calculate the necessary strength margins. The most obvious change was a switch from four small conventional ailerons at the tips to two slotted nearly full-span ailerons on the lower wing. This improved low speed control dramatically, allowing lateral control even after the aircraft had stalled - a novelty among American aircraft at the time, and a recurring advertising theme. The second change was the incorporation of a Phylax fire suppression system capable of putting almost any fire out in flight. The third novelty was the use of a rotisserie type fuselage jig, that ensured accuracy and consistency between the airframes they built, reducing the chance of building an airplane that couldn't be rigged to fly right. Although Command-Aire's advertising claims that Vollmecke invented this, he claimed he merely brought the idea from Europe.

=== Airframe details ===
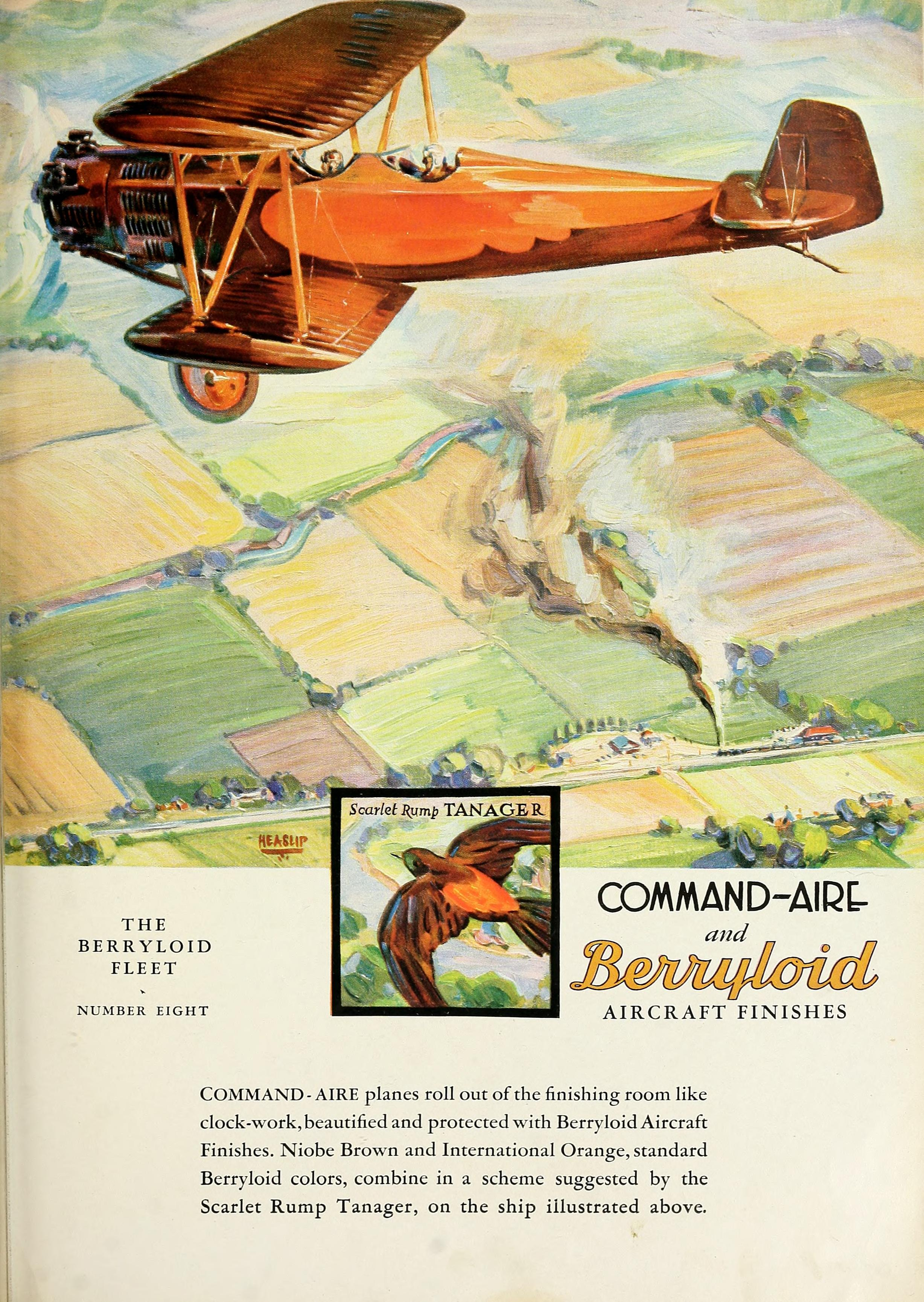
The Command-Aire 5C3 was featured in the Berryloid advertising series for aircraft dope, each featuring a different fabric covered aircraft, and each aircraft painted as a different bird. This advert was from the November 1929 Aerodigest

The fuselage was built in a rotating jig that ensured accuracy from welded chromium-molybdenum alloy steel tubes, faired with wooden battens. The top of the fuselage was covered in large metal panels that could be readily opened to provide access, and a compartment for luggage was provided between the cockpits large enough for a suitcase.

The slightly staggered wings were built around solid spruce spars, with spruce and plywood warren truss type ribs. The wings were braced with cables.

The ailerons and the entire empennage were also built from chromium-molybdenum alloy steel tubing, and all controls were actuated through pushrods and bellcranks, with no cables or pulleys used. The ailerons on the prototype were conventional, however on production variants, they extended across nearly the full span on the lower wings only, and had a slot that allowed air to flow over the aileron at low airspeeds and high angles of attack, which helped ensure lateral control even after the wings had stalled. These were not Frise-type ailerons though, but conventional ailerons with a slot at the hinge line.

The undercarriage was a split axle type, braced to a steel tube four point pyramid that extended from the belly of the aircraft, with suspension provided with bungee cords which were protected by leather boots. Both cabane and interplane struts took the form of an N and were steel tubing as well. The 3C3 can be distinguished from later types by having an additional strut providing lateral bracing from the forward strut anchor point on the wing, to the lower longeron at the firewall, triangulating the structure. The 4C3 and later types dispensed with this extra strut, and coincided with an extensive redesign that otherwise had few external differences.

While normally a three seat design, those aircraft with a T in the designation were built as two-seat trainers specifically for flight instruction, and a crop dusting version was also sold, with the space in the front cockpit being filled with a large hopper, and the fuel tank relocated to the wing center section. At least 17 of these were built, with others converted from other variants.

The BS-14 and BS-16 (BS standing for Biplane sport) were the final developments, and again featured extensive redesign work, but once again with few visible external alterations. The rudder was redesigned, and a new and promising engine was added to the lineup - the Lycoming R-680. On the BS-16, the undercarriage was changed to the outrigger type and a tailwheel was provided in lieu of the skid used previously, while the rear seat was raised to improve visibility.

=== Engines ===
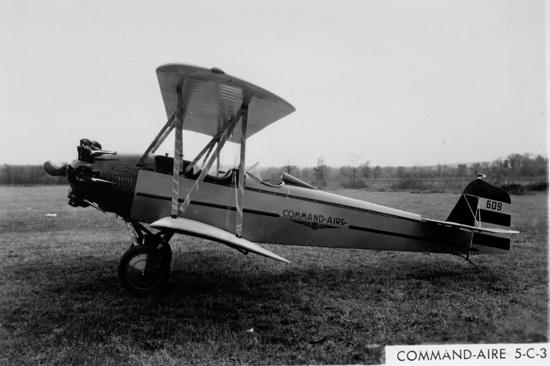
Curtiss Challenger-powered Command-Aire 5C3

A variety of engines were installed during the life of the design, with the area ahead of the firewall being redesigned to accommodate lighter engines, with longer noses to maintain the correct balance.

The problematic engine supply situation was well understood long before the last Curtiss OX-5 was installed in an airplane, and substantial efforts for alternatives were made. Simplicity and reliability were key, and the solutions invariably involved air-cooled radial engines, however the designs were not sufficiently developed, and there were many failures, and for various reasons. As a German, it was natural for Vollmecke to look to Germany, where some of the best designs were available, however two major problems surfaced. The first was that the supply of these engines was endangered by economic instability in Germany. The second was that the Command-Aire people were never able to get their engines to run right on the fuel available. Vollmecke suspected that the octane rating was too low, which caused knocking - potentially damaging the engine. Only 7 aircraft were built with the German radials. The Czechoslovak Walter NZ-120 was even less successful, and only one was used. The most successful of the replacement engines with Command-Aire, was the Curtiss Challenger, despite its poor reputation elsewhere. Over 50 aircraft were fitted with this engine. Had the company continued in existence, then the Wright J6 and Lycoming R-680 that were only installed in a small number of airframes, would probably have eventually outsold the OX-5 as they did with other aircraft types.

== Operational history ==
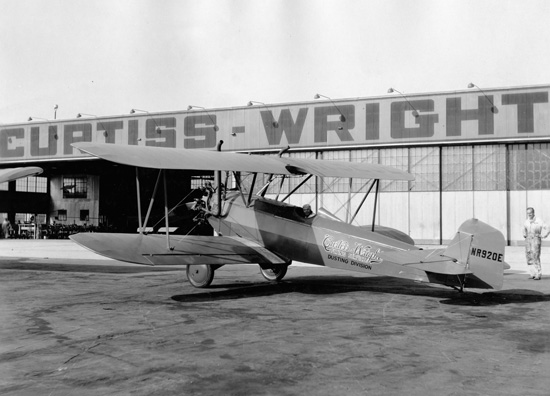
Command-Aire 5C3 crop duster with the Curtiss Flying Service Crop Dusting division

As a publicity stunt in 1928, the Command-Aire test pilot, Wright "Ike" Vermilya II demonstrated the 3C3's stability and ability to fly "hands off", by leaving the cockpit while in flight and riding the fuselage of the aircraft like one would ride a horse, without a parachute. He turned the aircraft by leaning in the desired direction. In another publicity stunt, a flight of over 100 miles (160 km) from San Diego to Los Angeles was made without once using the control stick as all control inputs were through the rudder pedals.

In 1929, the government decided to allow aerobatics (known as stunting at the time), during the Annual Arkansas Air Tour being held in 1929 and so a team of three Warner-powered Command-Aire 3C3-As were formed as "The Blue Devils", but painted incongruously in black and orange stripes.

A Challenger powered-Command-Aire 5C3 was entered into the Guggenheim Safe Aircraft Competition in 1929. Although the freakish Curtiss Tanager and Handley Page Gugnunc were the only ones to pass all the qualifying rounds, the 3C3 was the last aircraft not specially designed for the contest to be eliminated, and unlike those types would actually enter revenue service. It later succeeded on a repeat of the test that it was eliminated on.

In 1929, Command-Aire contracted the Curtiss Flying Service to handle sales, through their large number of facilities, and Curtiss purchased a large number of aircraft for flight training for their own schools. Recognizing that the excessive number of aircraft companies in the aviation industry would force consolidation into a smaller number of larger companies, it had long been the intention to merge Command-Aire into a larger company even before the onset of the Great Depression forced matters. Negotiations had been underway for just such a merger - into Curtiss, at one time the largest aircraft manufacturer in the United States, however while negotiations were still underway, Curtiss's financial problems forced it to merge with Wright Aeronautical. Unfortunately, Wright had themselves recently absorbed Travel Air, whose offerings included the Travel Air 2000 which was similar to the Command-Aire biplanes. Negotiations collapsed, and along with them, went the contracts for supplying the flying schools - and access to the sales network.

Command-Aire landed a by now much needed contract from the Chilean government to produce 36 3C3-BTs to be built at a specially built facility in Chile; however, no Command-Aires seem to have been either used in that country, either civil or military.

Only one example appears to have been exported, a 3C3 that went to Canada in 1931, where it went through a succession of private owners as CF-APQ, having previously been NC5590 in the US.

== Variants ==
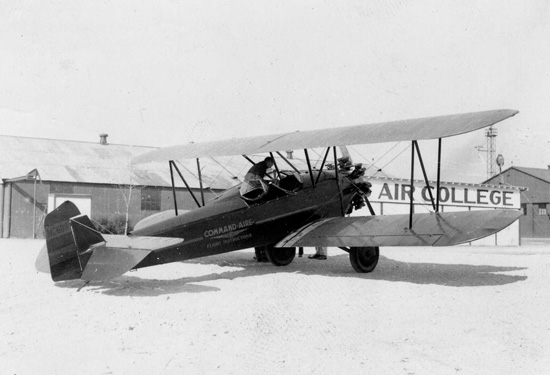
Command-Aire 5C3-B with Axelson radial engine at a flying school

(data from Eckland, www.aerofiles.com)

3C3 (ATC 53, 2-201)
1928 90 hp (67 kW) Curtiss OX-5, 116 built.
3C3-A (ATC 118)
1929 110 hp (82 kW) Warner Scarab, 20 built. 1 fitted with Edo floats.
3C3-AT (ATC 151)
1929 2 seat trainer developed from 3C3-A, about 6 built.
3C3-B (ATC 120, 2-440)
1929 105 hp (78 kW) Siemens-Halske Sh 12, 5 built, 1st possibly modified from 3C3 with a new c/n.
3C3-BT (ATC 209)
1929 113 hp (84 kW) Siemens-Halske Sh 14 2 seat trainer developed from 3C3-B. 2 built plus 1 converted from 3C3-B.
3C3-T (ATC 150)
1929 90 hp (67 kW) Curtiss OX-5, 30 built.

4C3
1929 120 hp (89 kW) Walter NZ-120 1 built

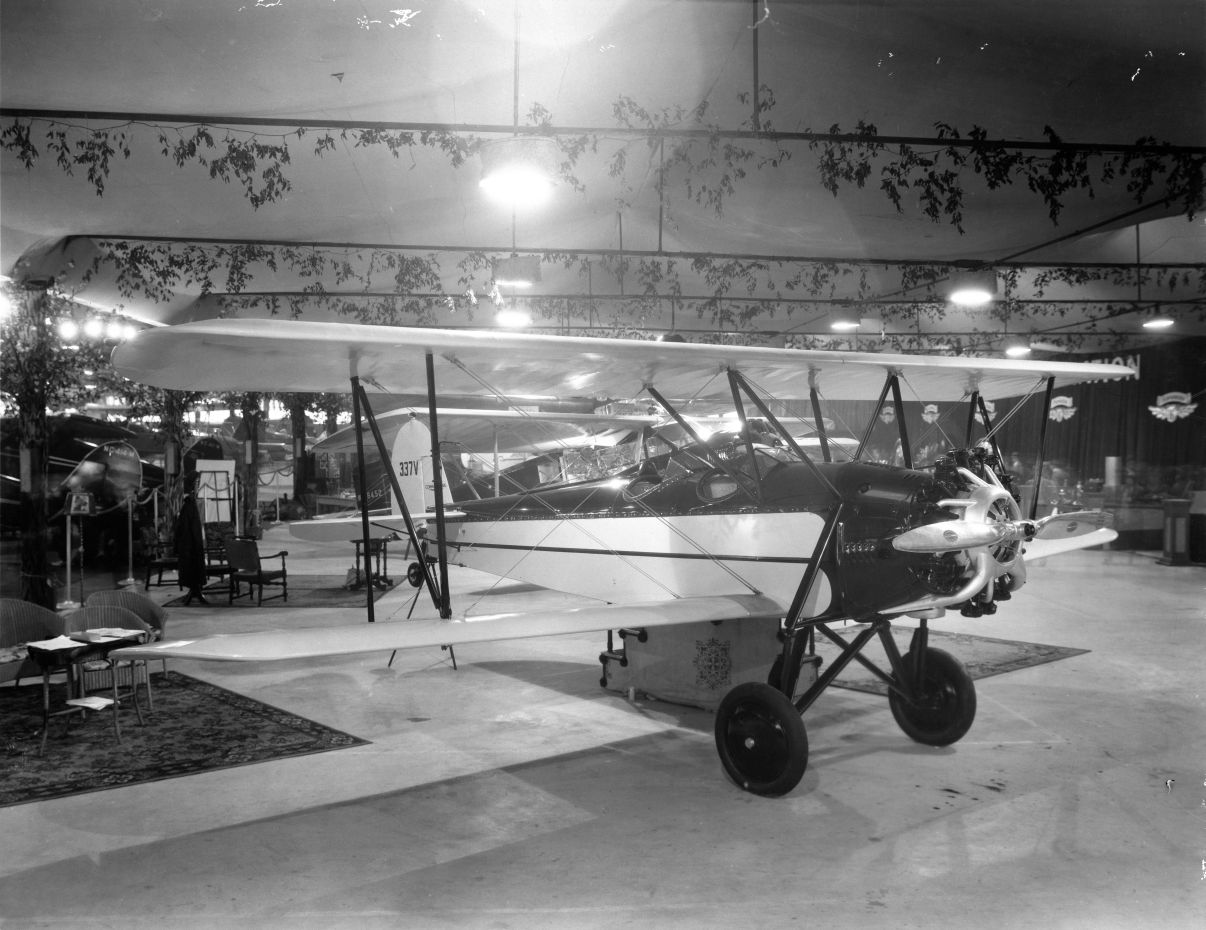
Command-Aire BS-16, the final development of the 3C3 line

5C3 (ATC 184)
1929 170 or 185 hp (127 or 138 kW) Curtiss Challenger, 35 built.
5C3-A (ATC 185)
1929 180 hp (130 kW) Hisso-Wright E, 3 built.
5C3-B (ATC 214)
1929 150 hp (110 kW) Axelson A, 4 built, One might be conversion of 3C3-A.
5C3-C (ATC 233)
1929 165 hp (123 kW) Wright J-6, 5 built, Some converted to cropdusters with front cockpit faired over
Cotton Duster
1930 170 hp (130 kW) Curtiss Challenger-powered 5C3 cropduster, 17 built.

BS-14 (ATC 2-204)
1930 125 hp (93 kW) Warner Scarab, 2 seat Biplane Sport aerobatic trainer, 1 built.
BS-16
1930 210 hp (160 kW) Lycoming R-680, 2 seat aerobatic trainer, 1 built.

== Surviving aircraft/Aircraft on display ==
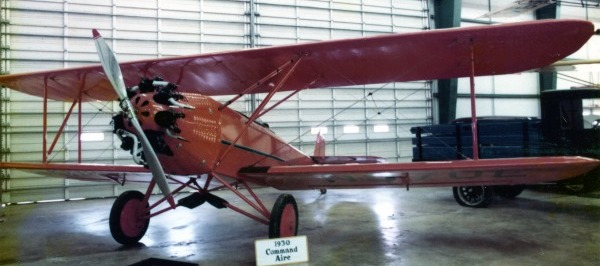
3C3-AT N970E

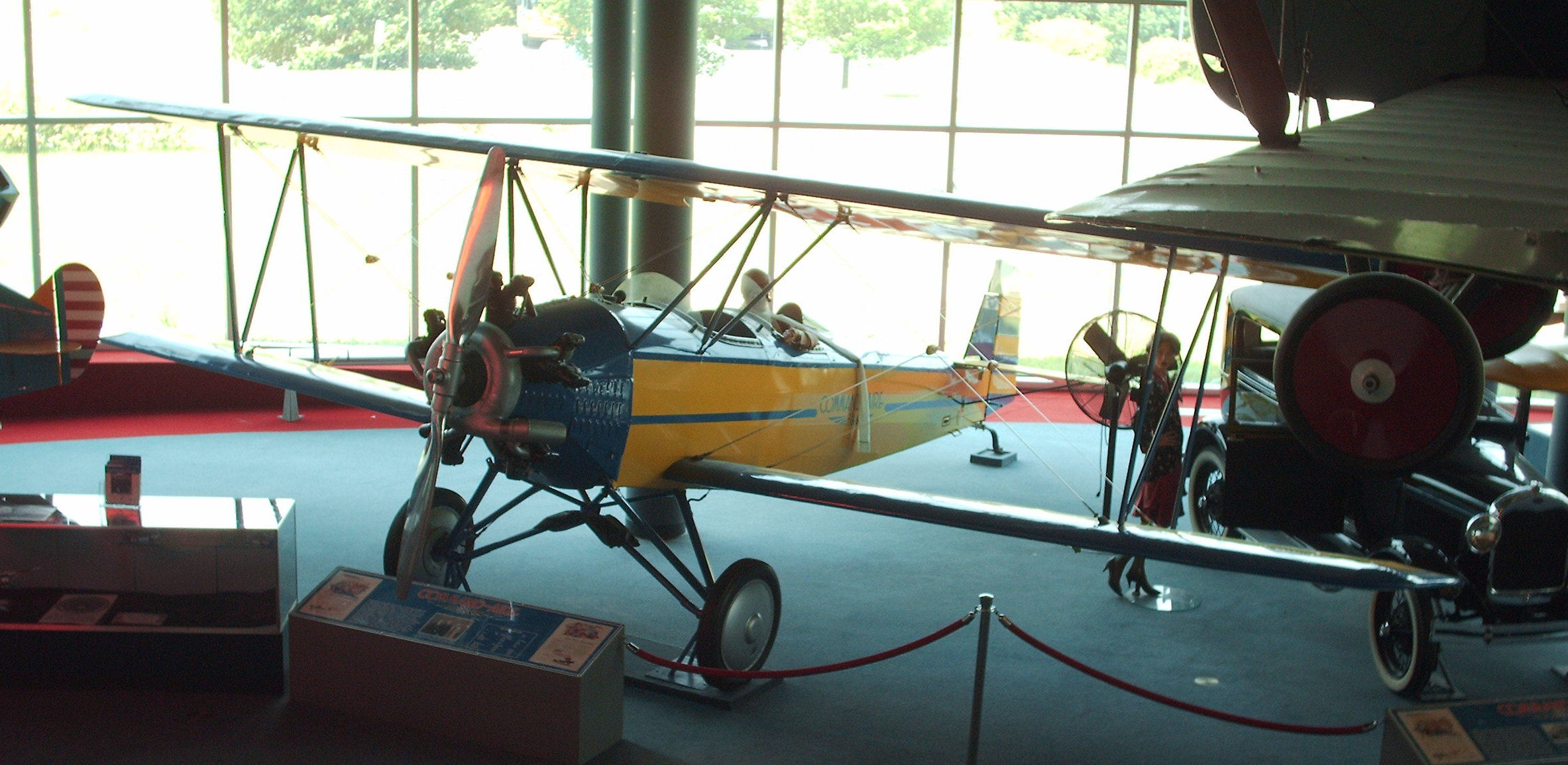
5C3 NC925E in the defunct Little Rock, Arkansas Aerospace Education Center

Ten examples have active registrations, but not all may be airworthy.

=== 3C3 ===
- 3C3 N7885 msn 530 Plainville, Georgia
- 3C3 N136E msn 532 is at the Yanks Air Museum in Chino, California
- 3C3 N476E msn 586 Hialeah, Florida
- 3C3-T N583E msn 607 is at the Western Antique Aeroplane & Automobile Museum in Hood River, Oregon
- 3C3-B N610E msn W-69 Snellville, Georgia
- 3C3-AT N970E msn W-108, was on display at the Western North Carolina Air Museum and the Wings and Wheels Museum in Orlando, Florida, now under private ownership and restoration in Westfield, MA.

=== 5C3 ===
- 5C3 N939E msn W-93 Rockton, Illinois
- 5C3 N946E msn W-95 Sitka, Alaska
- 5C3 N996E msn W-135 Lakeland, Florida
- 5C3 N997E msn W-136 Lancaster, Kansas

== Specifications (Command-Aire C3C (OX-5)) ==
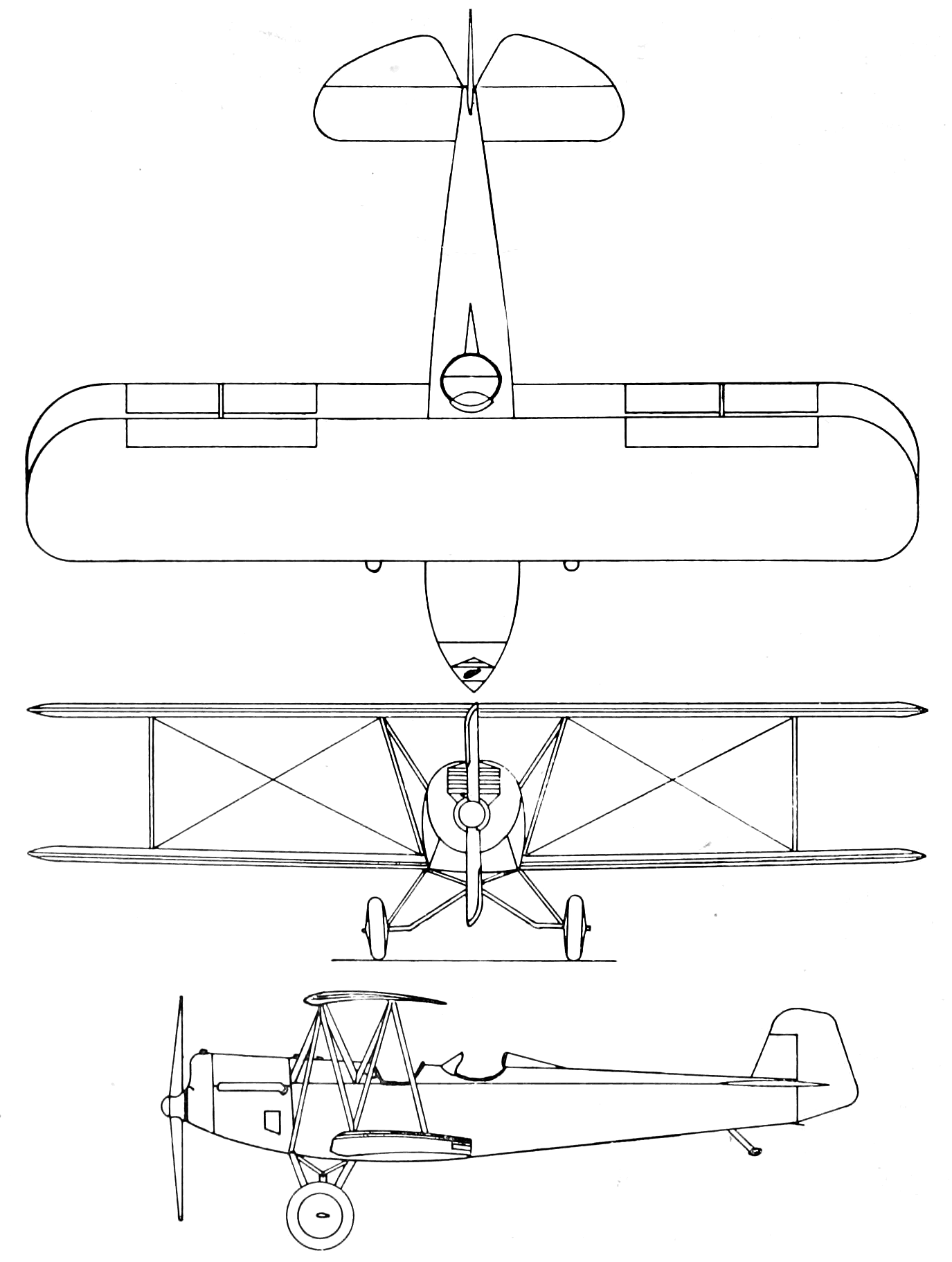
Command Aire 3C3 prototype 3-view from February 1928 Aero Digest. Production examples had only two ailerons instead of four

Data from Juptner, 1962, p.139-140

General characteristics

- Crew: One
- Capacity: Two
- Length: 24 ft 6 in (7.47 m)
- Upper wingspan: 31 ft 6 in (9.60 m)
- Upper chord: 60 in (1.5 m)
- Wing sweep: 0°
- Lower wingspan: 31 ft 6 in (9.60 m)
- Lower chord: 60 in (1.5 m)
- Height: 8 ft 4 in (2.54 m)
- Wing area: 303 sq ft (28.1 m^{2})
- Airfoil: Aeromarine 2A
- Empty weight: 1,410 lb (640 kg)
- Gross weight: 2,200 lb (998 kg)
- Useful load: 790 lb (360 kg)
- Fuel capacity: 40 US gal (150 L; 33 imp gal)
- Oil capacity: 4 US gal (15 L; 3.3 imp gal)
- Undercarriage track: 87 in (2.2 m)
- Powerplant: 1 × Curtiss OX-5 Water-cooled Vee-8, 90 hp (67 kW)
- Propellers: 2-bladed Wooden fixed pitch propeller

Performance

- Maximum speed: 100 mph (160 km/h, 87 kn)
- Cruise speed: 85 mph (137 km/h, 74 kn)
- Minimum control speed: 36 mph (58 km/h, 31 kn)
- Range: 440 mi (710 km, 380 nmi)

== See also ==
- 1928 in aviation

=== Aircraft of comparable role, configuration and era ===
(Partial listing, only covers most numerous types)

- Alexander Eaglerock
- American Eagle A-101
- Brunner-Winkle Bird
- Buhl-Verville CA-3 Airster
- Butler Blackhawk
- Parks P-1
- Pitcairn Mailwing
- Spartan C3
- Stearman C2 and C3
- Swallow New Swallow
- Travel Air 2000 and 4000
- Waco 10

=== Related lists ===
- List of aircraft
- List of civil aircraft
