= James Smith McDonnell =

American aviator, engineer and businessman (1899–1980)

- Born: April 9, 1899; Denver, Colorado, US
- Died: August 22, 1980 (aged 81); St. Louis, Missouri, US
- Education: Princeton University (B.S., Physics, 1921); Massachusetts Institute of Technology (M.S., Aeronautical Engineering, 1925)
- Known for: McDonnell Douglas
- Children: John F. McDonnell
- Relatives: Sanford N. McDonnell (nephew)
- Awards: NAS Award in Aeronautical Engineering; Daniel Guggenheim Medal (1963)

James Smith "Mac" McDonnell Jr. (April 9, 1899 – August 22, 1980) was an American aviator, engineer, and businessman. He was an aviation pioneer and founder of McDonnell Aircraft Corporation, later McDonnell Douglas (which is now Boeing, after the latter's company merger in 1997), and the James S. McDonnell Foundation.

== Early life ==
McDonnell was born on April 9, 1899, in Denver, and was of Scottish descent. He was raised in Little Rock, Arkansas, graduating from Little Rock High School in 1917. In 1921, he graduate from the Princeton University, and earned a Master's of Science in Aeronautical Engineering from MIT in 1925. While attending MIT he joined the Delta Upsilon fraternity. After graduating from MIT, he was hired by Thomas Towle for the Stout Metal Airplane Division of the Ford Motor Company. In 1927, he was hired by the Hamilton Metalplane Company to develop similar metal monoplanes. He then went on to Huff Daland Airplane Company.

== Career ==
In 1928, McDonnell left Huff Daland and set up J.S. McDonnell & Associates, and with the help of two other engineers, McDonnell set out to design his first aircraft with his company name. This aircraft then competed in a safe airplane contest which was sponsored by the Daniel Guggenheim Fund for the Promotion of Aeronautics and which offered a $100,000 prize for the winning entry. His design was the Doodle Bug. After the failure of the Doodle Bug to win the contest (the Curtiss Tanager won) or any commercial orders due to the Great Depression, he dissolved his firm and worked for the Great Lakes Aircraft Company in 1931 before he was hired as an engineer for the Glenn L. Martin Company.

McDonnell resigned from Martin in 1938 and founded McDonnell Aircraft Corporation in 1939. Headquartered in St. Louis, the company quickly grew into a principal supplier of fighter aircraft to the U.S. Air Force and U.S. Navy—including the F-4 Phantom II—and built the Mercury and Gemini space capsules.

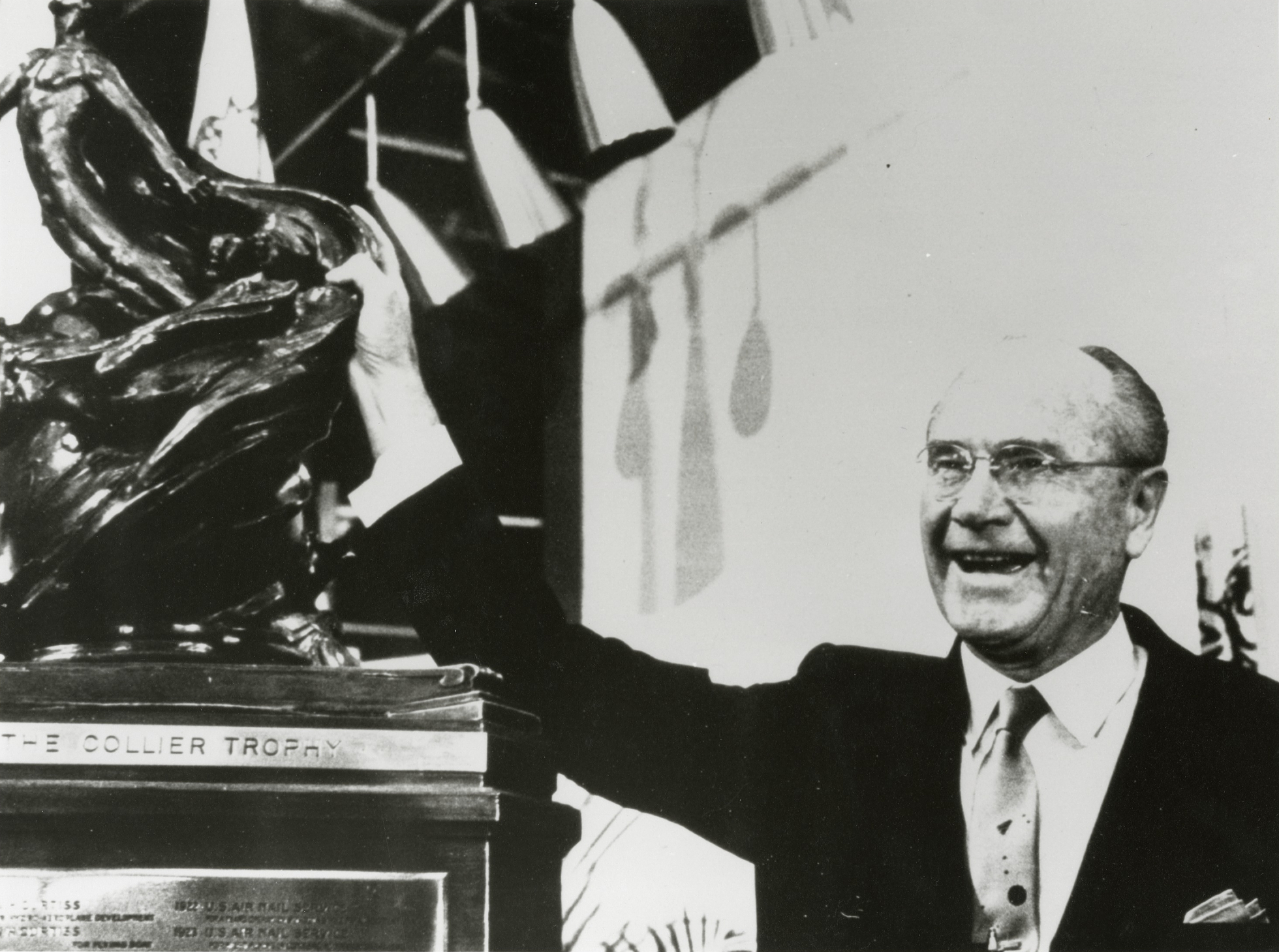
McDonnell with his Collier Trophy, 1966

In 1967, McDonnell Aircraft merged with the Douglas Aircraft Company to create McDonnell Douglas. Later that year Douglas Aircraft Company's space and missiles division became part of a new subsidiary called McDonnell Douglas Astronautics, located in Huntington Beach, California, producing the Delta series of launch vehicles. The new combined company also developed the F-15 Eagle and F/A-18 Hornet fighters.

He served as chairman of the United Nations Association of the United States, and in 1958 his company became the first organization in the world to celebrate United Nations Day as a paid holiday. In 1980 McDonnell was awarded the NAS Award in Aeronautical Engineering from the National Academy of Sciences.

McDonnell was succeeded as Chair of McDonnell Douglas by his nephew Sanford N. McDonnell in 1980.

McDonnell Douglas and Boeing consolidated in 1997.

== Personal life ==
McDonnell was married twice. His first marriage, to Mary Elizabeth Finney, took place in Baltimore, Maryland, on June 30, 1934. They had two children, James Smith McDonnell, III, born January 28, 1936, and John Finney McDonnell, born March 18, 1938. Mary McDonnell died on July 6, 1949. He married Priscilla Brush Forney on April 1, 1956, and adopted her three children from a previous marriage. His stepchildren included the prominent electrical engineer Dave Forney.

McDonnell died of a stroke on August 22, 1980. He was buried in Bellefontaine Cemetery in St. Louis.

== Legacy ==
McDonnell founded the James S. McDonnell Foundation in 1950, which supports scientific, educational, and charitable causes on a local, national, and international level. The McDonnell Center for the Space Sciences is named after him, which he co-founded - established in 1974. McDonnell Hall, housing part of the physics department at his alma mater, Princeton, also bears his name and an airplane-inspired design.

The six James S. McDonnell Distinguished University Professorships at Princeton University were established by a gift from the James S. McDonnell Foundation in memory of James S. McDonnell. Among the Princeton faculty members who have held the professorship are Val Fitch, Joseph Taylor, Anne Treisman, Curtis G. Callan, Lyman A. Page, Eddie S. Glaude, and numerous others.

== Tributes ==
McDonnell Park in St. Louis County is named in honor of James Smith McDonnell, as are the McDonnell Planetarium of the Saint Louis Science Center in Forest Park, the James S. McDonnell classroom and laboratory building at Princeton University, the James S. McDonnell Hall at Washington University in St. Louis, and James S. McDonnell Boulevard and James S. McDonnell Prologue Room near St. Louis Lambert International Airport.

The Arkansas Aviation Historical Society selected McDonnell in 1980 as one of five initial inductees in the Arkansas Aviation Hall of Fame.

McDonnell was enshrined in the National Aviation Hall of Fame in 1977.
