= Weymann-Lepère C.18 =

Prototype autogyro built in France in 1929

C.18

General information
- Type: utility autogyro
- National origin: France
- Manufacturer: Weymann-Lepère
- Designer: Georges Lepère
- Number built: 1

History
- First flight: 12 August 1929

The Weymann-Lepère C.18 (also known as the Cierva C.18 (Note: The designation C.18 strictly belongs to an unbuilt 1927 design by Juan de la Cierva for a small, single-seat autogyro to be powered by a Bristol Cherub or five-cylinder Siemens-Halske engine)) was an autogyro built in France in 1929. It was entered in the Guggenheim Safe Aircraft Competition in the United States that year, but was not ready for competition and was not delivered for testing. It was the first autogyro built with an enclosed cabin, and one of the first rotary wing craft to be equipped with a rotor brake.

== Design ==
The C.18 was a tractor autogiro with stub wings that had upturned tips. It had tailskid undercarriage and a conventional tail. The enclosed cabin had seating for the pilot and one to three passengers. Construction throughout was metal, using a stressed-skin method pioneered by designer Georges Lepère. Power was originally from a Salmson 7AC or Wright J-5 radial engine in the nose.

The main rotor had four blades and was wire-braced. The horizontal stabiliser could pivot to deflect airflow from the propeller upwards into the rotor and therefore begin rotation.

== Development ==
The Cierva Company ordered the C.18 from their French licensee Weymann-Lepère for Loel Guinness so it could be entered in the Guggenheim Safe Aircraft Competition. It was registered in the UK as G-AAIH in June, but first flew at Villacoublay on 12 August, probably with Juan de la Cierva himself at the controls. It was shipped to the US in late August or early September, probably without its engine.

Harold F. Pitcairn, Cierva's American licensee, hoped to enter his Pitcairn PCA-1 autogyro in the same competition. However, when it was clearly not going to be ready in time, he arranged to enter the C.18 instead. Pitcairn fitted it with a Wright J-6 engine, and modified it with a new rotor and hub of his design, a taller rotor pylon, improved landing gear, and other changes. It first flew in this form in September, again probably with Cierva himself at the controls. However, its poor performance and high levels of vibration meant that it would not be ready for the competition either, and was not presented for testing.

It is not known to have flown after November 1929, and its ultimate fate is now uncertain.

== Specifications (final) ==
Data from Brooks 1988, p.96

General characteristics

- Crew: 1 pilot
- Capacity: 1–3 passengers
- Powerplant: 1 × Wright J-6-7 air-cooled, seven-cylinder, radial engine, 168 kW (225 hp)
- Main rotor diameter: 12.6 m (41 ft 4 in)

== Notes ==
=== Bibliography ===
- Brooks, Peter W. (1988). Cierva Autogiros: The Development of Rotary-Wing Flight. Washington D.C.: Smithsonian Institution.
- The Daniel Guggenheim International Safe Aircraft Competition: Final Report. New York: The Daniel Guggenheim Fund for the Promotion of Aeronautics. 31 January 1930.
- The Illustrated Encyclopedia of Aircraft. London: Aerospace Publishing.
- Jackson, Aubrey Joseph (1959). British Civil Aircraft 1919-59: Volume 1. London: Putnam.
