= John F. McDonnell =

American aerospace executive (born 1938)

- Born: March 18, 1938 (age 88); Baltimore, Maryland
- Education: Princeton University (BSc '60, MSc '62)
- Spouse: Anne Marbury (m. 1961)
- Father: James Smith McDonnell
- Relatives: Sanford N. McDonnell (cousin)

John Finney McDonnell (born March 18, 1938) is an American businessman, engineer, and philanthropist. McDonnell served as the chairman of the McDonnell Douglas Corporation from 1988 until its merger with Boeing in 1997 and its chief executive officer from 1988 until 1994. He was a corporate director at Boeing from the 1997 merger until 2012, when he reached the Boeing-mandated retirement age of 74.

== Early life and career ==
Born in Baltimore, Maryland, in 1938, McDonnell is the son of McDonnell Aircraft founder James Smith McDonnell and Mary Elizabeth Finney. A graduate of St. Louis Country Day School (now Mary Institute and St. Louis Country Day School), McDonnell completed his Bachelor's and Master's degrees in aeronautical engineering at Princeton University in 1960 and 1962, respectively. He earned an MBA from the Olin Business School at Washington University in St. Louis, which also awarded him an honorary doctorate in science in 2006. After marrying his wife Anne in 1961, McDonnell began working for MAC as a strength engineer on Project Gemini the following year. He was instrumental in founding McDonnell Douglas Finance Corporation in Los Angeles and ultimately becoming a vice president of the division in 1968. After McDonnell became Chairman in 1988, he helped create the newsmagazine 90 Days as a way to keep employees and shareholders abreast of what was going on in McDonnell Douglas.

After McDonnell Douglas and Boeing merged in 1997, McDonnell himself held the title of largest individual shareholder in the combined company in March 2003. In addition to his continued involvement with Boeing, he is also a director of BJC HealthCare, chairman of the board of Barnes-Jewish Hospital and vice chairman of the board of Washington University. McDonnell is also a lifetime trustee of the St. Louis Science Center. He, along with his brother, James S. McDonnell III, sit on the board of directors of the James S. McDonnell Foundation, which is based in St. Louis, MO. In 2006, McDonnell and the JSM Charitable Trust endowed $10 million to Washington University for the creation of the McDonnell International Scholars Academy. Commenting on the program McDonnell said, "So far the Academy has progressed beyond my expectations." McDonnell was later named St. Louis "Citizen of the Year" in 2009. McDonnell resides in the St. Louis area, and enjoys traveling and tennis as hobbies.
