= Climber Motor Car Factory, Unit A =

- U.S. National Register of Historic Places
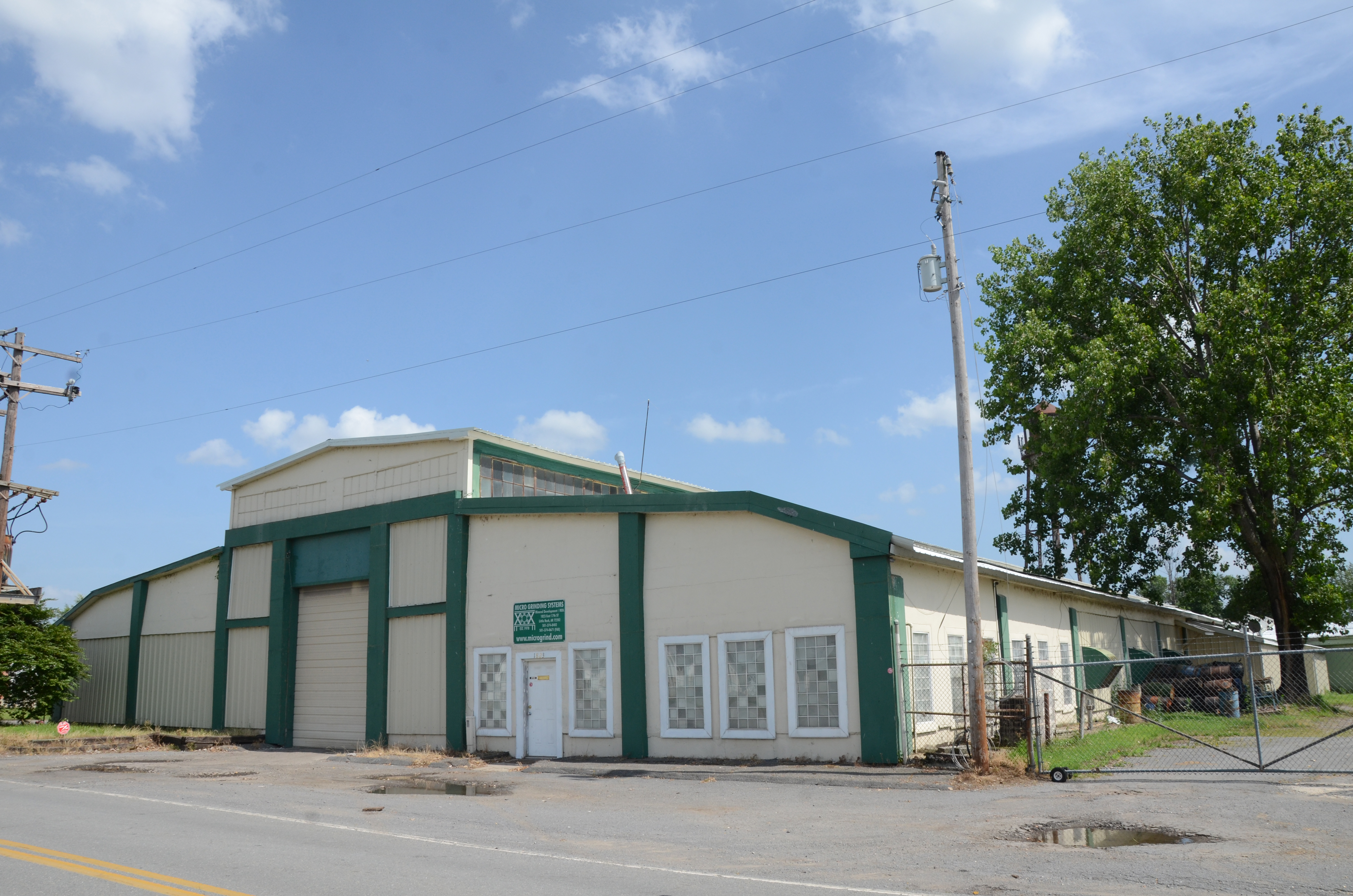

- Location within Arkansas Location within the United States
- Location: 1823 E. 17th St., Little Rock, Arkansas
- Coordinates: 34°43′56″N 92°14′56″W
- Area: 4 acres (1.6 ha)
- Built: 1919
- Architectural style: Plain Traditional
- MPS: Arkansas Highway History and Architecture MPS
- NRHP reference No.: 05000500
- Added to NRHP: June 1, 2005

Unit A of the Climber Motor Car Factory is a historic industrial building at 1823 East 17th Street in Little Rock, Arkansas. It is a large wood-frame structure, topped by a gabled monitor roof. Its walls are concrete block for the bottom 2 feet (0.61 m), and wood frame between concrete pillars above. The building was constructed in 1919 for the Climber Motor Company, the only automobile manufacturer founded in the state, and was the only part actually built of a planned multi-building complex. The company manufactured automobiles here until 1924, after which it was used by Command-Aire to build light aircraft, and by the Great Northern Paper Company to manufacture toilet paper.

The building was listed on the National Register of Historic Places in 2005.

== See also ==
- National Register of Historic Places listings in Little Rock, Arkansas
