= Guggenheim Safe Aircraft Competition =

The Guggenheim Safe Aircraft Competition was a competition held in the United States in 1929 to promote the design of safer airplanes. Officially, it aimed "to achieve a real advance in the safety of flying through improvement in the aerodynamic characteristics of heavier-than-air craft, without sacrificing the good, practical qualities of the present-day aircraft."

The Daniel Guggenheim Fund for the Promotion of Aeronautics offered a prize of US$100,000 for the most outstanding aircraft design, plus five prizes of $10,000 for safety innovations. The competition was announced on April 20, 1927 to run between September 1, 1927 until October 31, 1929 unless the judges deemed that the competition objectives had been met earlier.

== Criteria ==
The aircraft were to be judged against the following criteria:

- Use a reliable powerplant
- Be structurally sound
- Carry 5 pounds (2.3 kg) of load per 1 horsepower (0.75 kW) of engine power
- Have adequate visibility for the pilot and observer
- Demonstrate good stability
- Be able to recover from abnormal flight conditions
- Remain maneuverable, controllable, and safe if the engine failed during a steep climb
- Have a maximum speed of at least 130 miles per hour (210 km/h), a minimum speed of at most 30 miles per hour (48 km/h), and a minimum gliding speed of at most 32 miles per hour (51 km/h)
- Be able to take off within 75 feet (23 m) and land within 40 feet (12 m)
- Be able to clear a 35-foot (11 m) obstacle within 240 feet (73 m) of take-off and 150 feet (46 m) of landing

== Judges ==
The judging panel comprised:

- Orville Wright, Chairman
- Admiral Richard E. Byrd, aviator and explorer
- F. Trubee Davison, Assistant Secretary of War for Air
- Dr. George W. Lewis, aeronautical engineer
- William P. MacCracken, Jr. U.S. Assistant Secretary of Commerce for Aeronautics
- Edward Pearson Warner, early aviation pioneer

== Entries ==
The organizers originally anticipated over 100 entries, but by the closing date only twenty-seven applications were received. These were mostly from American manufacturers, but also five from the UK and one from Italy. Of these, only fifteen applicants presented an aircraft before the closing date of the competition. Although the judges had expected to evaluate designs throughout the competition period, the first aircraft was not presented until August 1929, and almost all aircraft arrived in the last month before the competition closed. This, combined with poor weather at the testing location (Mitchel Field), and the barely-ready state of many of the aircraft caused significant challenges for the judging process. One entry, the Dare Safety Plane suffered a structural failure in flight before arriving at the competition, killing its test pilot and its designer.

The entries received were:

Entrant	Nation	Aircraft	Result
Heraclio Alfaro	USA	Alfaro X-13	Disqualified; insufficient speed
Bourdon Aircraft Company	USA	Bourdon B.4 Kitty Hawk	Disqualified
Società Italiana Ernesto Breda	Italy	Breda Ba.18	Did not start
Brunner-Winkle Aircraft Corporation	USA	Brunner-Winkle Bird	Disqualified
Vincent Burnelli	USA	Burnelli GX-3	Withdrew
Cierva Autogiro Company	UK	Weymann-LePère C.18	Did not start; built for Cierva's entry, but transferred to Pitcairn for their entry instead (see below).
Command-Aire	USA	Command-Aire 3C3	Disqualified
Cosmic Aircraft Corporation	USA		Did not start
Cunningham-Hall Aircraft Corporation	USA	Cunningham-Hall Model X-90(N)	Disqualified
Curtiss Aeroplane and Motor Company	USA	Curtiss Tanager	Winner
Dare Airplane Company	USA	Dare Safety Plane	Did not start; fatal crash July 17, 1929
de Havilland	UK	-	Did not start; canceled entry before August 3, citing too much work from British government contracts.
Fleet Aircraft	USA	Fleet Model 2	Disqualified
Ford-Leigh Safety Wing	USA	modified Brunner-Winkle Bird	Disqualified
Gates Aircraft Corporation	USA	Stampe et Vertongen RSV.26/100 "mono-biplane"	Withdrew
Gloster	UK		Did not start
Charles Ward Hall	USA		Did not start
Handley Page	UK	Handley Page Gugnunc	Disqualified; failed glide test requirement
J. S. McDonnell Jr and Associates	USA	McDonnell Doodlebug	Crashed
Mercury Aircraft/Schroeder-Wentworth	USA	Schroeder-Wentworth Monoplane	Crashed
Moth Aircraft Corporation	USA	de Havilland Moth fitted with Handley Page automatic leading-edge slots	Withdrew
Pitcairn-Cierva Autogiro Company of America	USA	Pitcairn PCA-1	Did not start; not ready in time. Pitcairn arranged to enter the Weymann-LePère C.18 imported as Cierva's entry, but this was not ready either.
Rocheville Aircraft Corporation	USA		Did not start
Taylor Bros Aircraft Corporation	USA	Taylor C-2	Disqualified
Vickers	UK	-	Did not start; canceled entry before August 3, citing too much work from British government contracts.
Whittelsey Manufacturing Company	USA	Whittelsey Avian fitted with Handley Page automatic leading-edge slots	Did not start
John H. Wiggins Company	USA		DNS=Did not start

== Results ==
Flight tests were completed on January 1, 1930. The Curtiss Tanager and Handley Page Gugnunc were the only two aircraft to complete the entire testing program. The Gugnunc was unable to meet the glide test requirements, leaving the Tanager as the only fully qualified entry and therefore the winner. Of the other thirteen aircraft that presented for testing, three withdrew, two were damaged during testing and could not complete the program, and eight others were disqualified. The result was announced on January 6, 1930.

However, the win led to legal action by Handley Page, because the company accused Curtiss of using their patented automatic wing slot design on the Tanager without permission. In a separate action, A. J. Leigh accused Handley Page of copying his "Safety Wing" design. These matters were never resolved in court.
