= 90 Days =

90 Days or 90 Day may refer to:

== Film ==
- 90 Days (film), a 1985 Canadian comedy
- 90 Days (video report), a video news magazine produced by McDonnell Douglas
- 90 Day Wondering, a 1956 Warner Bros. cartoon made for the US Army
- Mission 90 Days, a 2007 Indian Malayalam-language film

== Music ==
- "90 Days", a song by Pink from Hurts 2B Human (2019)
- 90 Day Men, an American progressive rock band

== Television ==
- 90 Days, Time to Love, a 2006 South Korean television series
- 90 Day Fiancé, an American reality television series
