= McDonnell Park =

Park in Missouri, United States

McDonnell Park (James S. McDonnell Park)
- Interactive map of McDonnell Park (James S. McDonnell Park)
- Type: St. Louis County Parks
- Location: Unincorporated St. Louis County, MO
- Coordinates: 38.715°N 90.402°W
- Area: 131 acres (53 ha)
- Created: 1978
- Operator: St. Louis County Parks Department
- Status: Open all year (except Easter, Thanksgiving and Christmas)
- Public transit: MetroBus

McDonnell Park is a county park in unincorporated Central St. Louis County, between the cities of Overland, St. Ann, Creve Coeur and Maryland Heights, in the U.S. state of Missouri. The park is named in honor of James S. McDonnell, founder of McDonnell Douglas Aircraft.

== History ==
McDonnell Park was originally referred to as the Adie Road Parksite when purchased in 1977. It was declared a county park in 1978. In 1980 the name was officially changed to James S. McDonnell Memorial County Park in honor of the late founder of McDonnell Douglas. The house in the southeast corner of the park is the Park Ranger's/Area Manager's office.

== Amenities ==
- Fitness and bike trail: The 1.6 mile trail winds through the park and has 16 fitness stations which include parallel bars, isometric squats, balance beam, chin-up bar and stretch station. It is suitable for jogging, running, walking, skating and biking.
- Amphitheater: A natural amphitheater can seat over 200.
- Shelters and picnic tables: The park features two main shelters with water, electricity, barbecue pits, and restrooms. McDonnell Shelter is named after James S. McDonnell, and Lindbergh Shelter is named after Charles Lindbergh. Multiple picnic tables surround the shelters and are scattered throughout the park.
- Playgrounds: McDonnell Park consists of two playgrounds, one near Lindbergh Shelter in the northwest corner of the park and one near the McDonnell Shelter in the middle-south area of the park.
- Volleyball court: Sand volleyball is available near the Lindbergh Shelter.

== Events and usage ==
Park facilities can be rented for reunions, weddings and other activities. McDonnell Park has been host to the annual Fords Unlimited Car Show for over 20 years.
