= McDonnell Doodlebug =

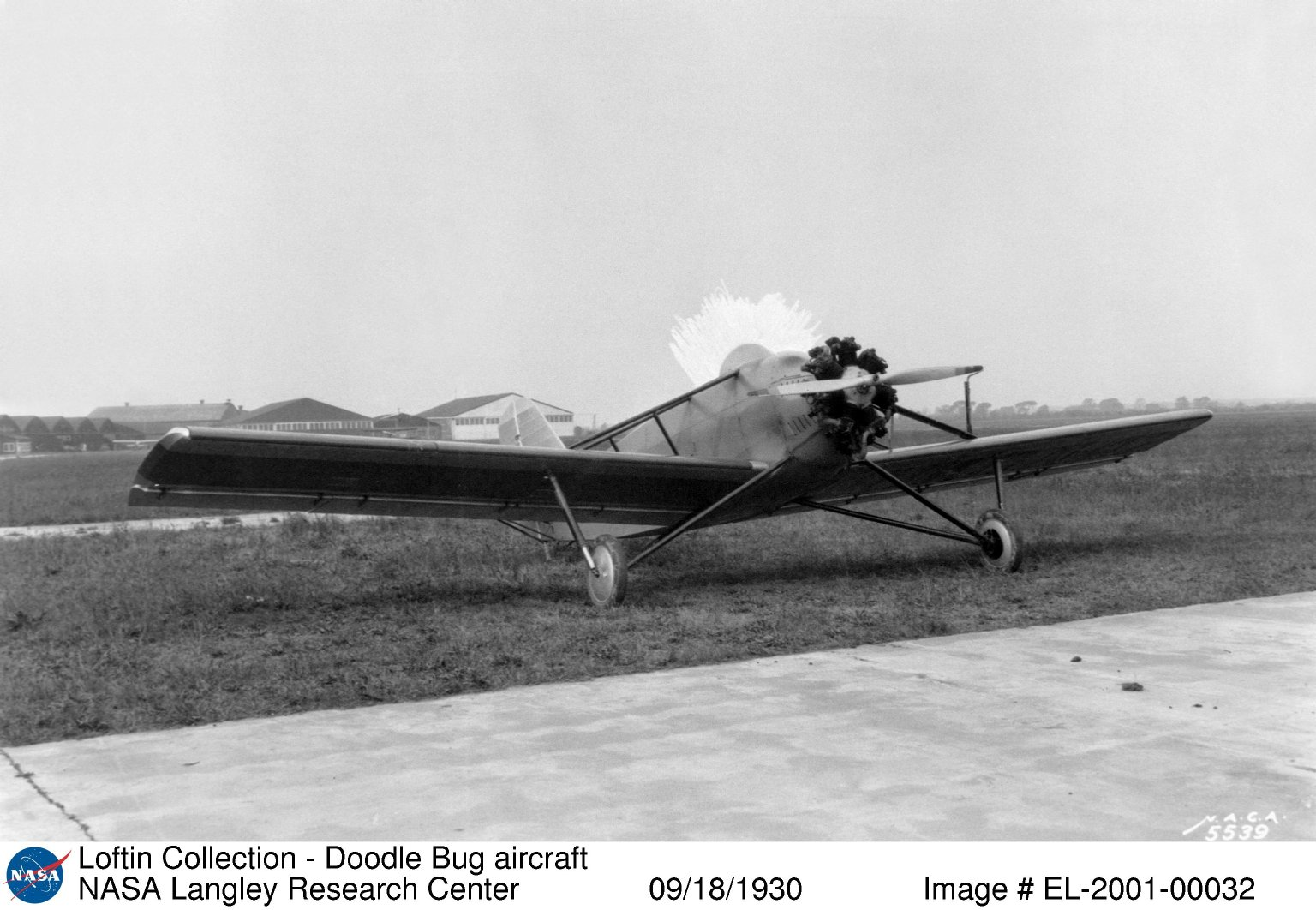
- McDonnell Doodlebug at Langley

General information
- National origin: United States of America
- Manufacturer: J.S. McDonnell Jr. & Associates
- Designer: James Smith McDonnell, James Cowling, and Constantine Zakhartchenko
- Number built: 1

History
- Introduction date: October 1929
- First flight: 15 November 1929

The McDonnell Doodlebug is a light aircraft that was built to win the Guggenheim Safe Aircraft Competition in 1929 by McDonnell Aircraft founder, James Smith McDonnell.

== Design and development ==
The Doodlebug was built in response to a 1927 safety contest sponsored by the Daniel Guggenheim Fund for the Promotion of Aeronautics with a prize of $100,000. The aircraft was built at the Hamilton Aero Manufacturing factory in Milwaukee, Wisconsin. l The Doodlebug is a tandem-seat low wing taildragger with a fabric covered steel tube fuselage. The landing gear featured widely spaced main wheels. The wings featured full-length leading-edge slats.

== Operational history ==
The Doodlebug was produced too late to compete, but was granted an exemption. The aircraft's tail folded upward in initial demonstrations at Mitchel Field in New York, and allowed more extensions to repair damages. After a forced landing due to engine failure, the Doodlebug missed the opportunity to be judged in the competition. The winner of the competition was a Curtiss Tanager. The forced landing caused McDonnell a back injury, but he still drove the aircraft to demonstrate in various air shows throughout the start of the Great Depression. In 1931 the Doodlebug was sold to the National Advisory Committee for Aeronautics (NACA) as a demonstrator for leading edge slats.

== Specifications (McDonnell Doodlebug) ==
General characteristics

- Capacity: 2
- Length: 21 ft 4 in (6.50 m)
- Wingspan: 35 ft (11 m)
- Wing area: 196.5 sq ft (18.26 m^{2})
- Empty weight: 1,250 lb (567 kg)
- Gross weight: 1,800 lb (816 kg)
- Powerplant: 1 × Warner Scarab radial engine, 110 hp (82 kW)

Performance

- Maximum speed: 96 kn (110 mph, 180 km/h)
