= Daniel Guggenheim =

American mining magnate and philanthropist (1856–1930)

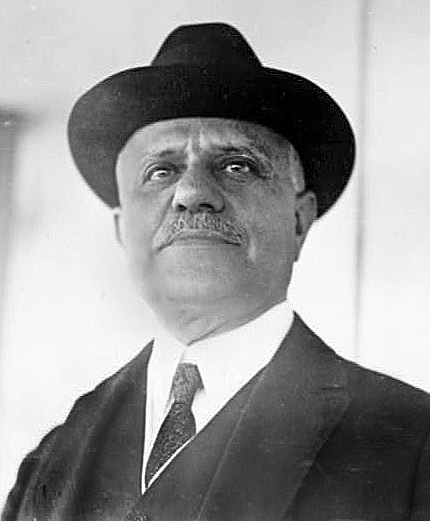
- Guggenheim in 1925
- Born: July 9, 1856; Philadelphia, Pennsylvania, U.S.
- Died: September 28, 1930 (aged 74); Port Washington, New York, U.S.
- Education: Peirce College
- Known for: Battle for control of ASARCO; Daniel Guggenheim Medal
- Spouse: Florence Shloss
- Children: Meyer Robert Guggenheim; Harry Guggenheim; Gladys Eleanor Guggenheim
- Parent(s): Meyer Guggenheim; Barbara Guggenheim

Daniel Guggenheim (July 9, 1856 – September 28, 1930) was an American mining magnate and philanthropist, and a son of Meyer and Barbara Guggenheim. By 1910 he directed the world's most important group of mining interests. He was forced out in 1922 and retired to philanthropy to promote aviation. His achievements include a system for innovation, as well as leadership in amicable labor relations, and major roles in aviation and rocketry.

== Biography ==
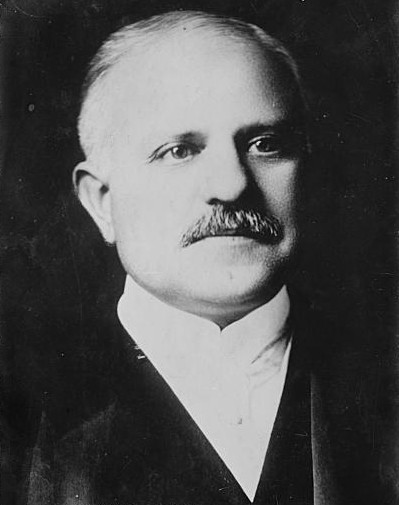
Daniel Guggenheim, 1910

Guggenheim was born and raised in Philadelphia, the son of Meyer Guggenheim and his wife Barbara. Meyer Guggenheim was of Jewish descent. Daniel Guggenheim was sent to Switzerland as a young man to study the Swiss lace and embroidery business, and to serve as a buyer for his father's import firm. The discovery of high-grade silver-lead ore in the Guggenheim mines in Leadville, Colorado, in 1881 became the foundation for the Guggenheim fortune in mining. In 1884, Daniel returned to the US to help manage the family's booming mining and smelting business. Daniel helped to establish the Guggenheim mining and smelting business in Mexico, which by 1895 was earning profits of $1 million a year.

In 1891 his father, Meyer, consolidated about a dozen of the family's mining operations into the Colorado Smelting and Refining Company. The Guggenheim family then entered a lengthy struggle with the American Smelting and Refining Company (ASARCO), backed by the Rockefeller family. By 1901 the Guggenheims had acquired control of ASARCO, and became the dominant force in the mining industry for the next three decades. Daniel was named chairman of the board of ASARCO, and directed the trust until 1919.

Following his father's death in 1905, Daniel assumed control of the Guggenheim family enterprises. Through ASARCO, Kennecott Copper and other family-owned companies, the Guggenheims mined tin in Bolivia, gold in the Yukon, diamonds and rubber in the Belgian Congo, diamonds in Angola, and copper in Alaska, Utah, and Chile. Daniel Guggenheim's business policies affected entire nations. "It was said that Daniel could make or break a government with a telegram," his biographer John H. Davis wrote. Daniel was power hungry and tenacious. He suffered repeatedly with stomach ulcers and hypertension. The Guggenheim family amassed enormous wealth through their mining enterprises. By 1918, the family fortune was estimated at $250 million to $300 million, making them among the richest people in the world.

Daniel was a member of the National Security League, the driving force for moving the then-neutral USA into World War I, which was headed by J.P. Morgan.

Long-simmering family disagreements reached a climax in 1922, when the older Guggenheim brothers were accused of milking ASARCO, which they controlled, for the benefit of their family business, Guggenheim Brothers. The ASARCO board then voted the brothers out of control. After other family disagreements and business setbacks, Daniel retired in 1923 at the age of 67.

== Personal life ==
On July 22, 1884, he married Florence Shloss; they had three children: Meyer Robert Guggenheim; Harry Frank Guggenheim; and Gladys Eleanor Guggenheim Straus. He died on September 28, 1930, at his palatial home, Hempstead House, in Port Washington, New York. He was 74.

=== Aviation ===
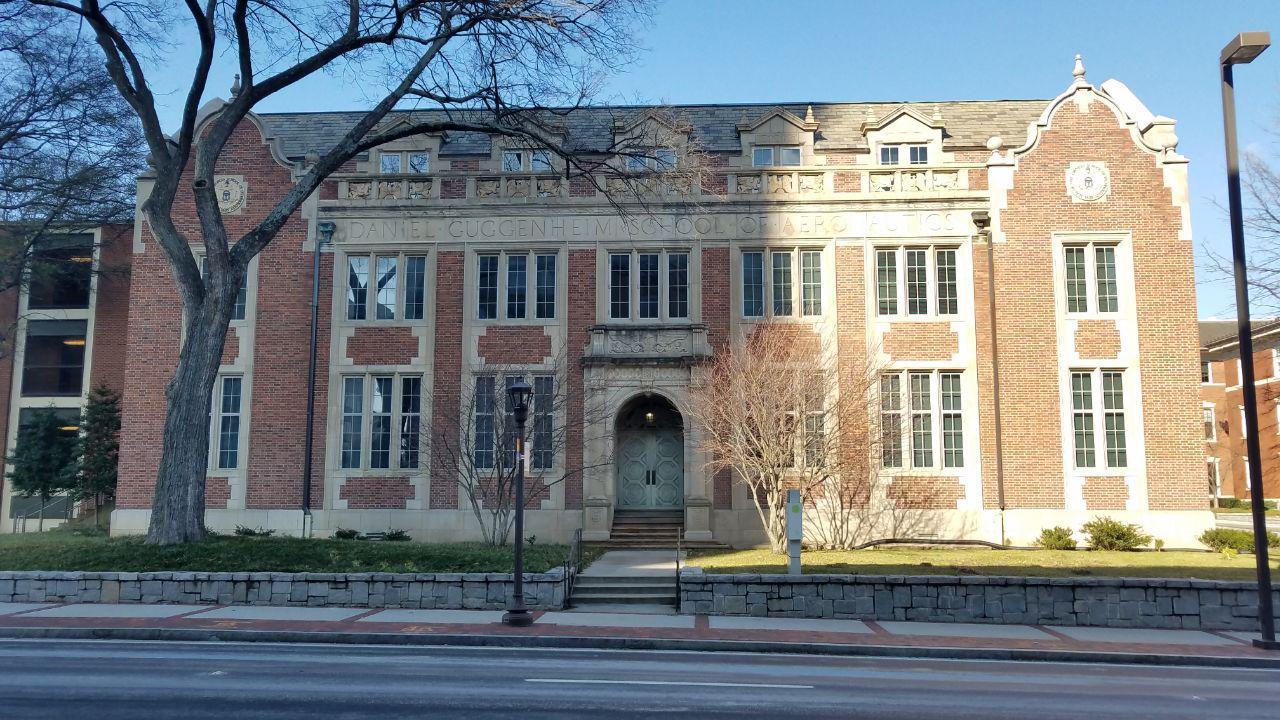
The Daniel Guggenheim Aerospace Engineering Building at Georgia Tech

During WWI, Daniel's son Harry Guggenheim became a pilot and both became avid supporters of aviation technology. In the 1920s they established the Daniel Guggenheim Medal for achievement in aeronautics and provided grants via the Daniel Guggenheim Fund for the Promotion of Aeronautics for aeronautics research at California Institute of Technology, Princeton University, Georgia Institute of Technology, Harvard University, Massachusetts Institute of Technology, New York University, Northwestern University, Stanford University, Syracuse University, the University of Akron, the University of Michigan, and the University of Washington. Foundation moneys funded the Guggenheim Aeronautical Laboratories at Caltech (GALCIT) and the Guggenheim Aerospace Propulsion Laboratories at Princeton University. In 1927 he offered a $100,000 main prize and five $10,000 prizes for the "Guggenheim Safe Aircraft Competition", which required entered aircraft to be stable in rough air, land in 500 feet and take off in 300 feet, both over a 35-foot obstacle and be able to sustain flight at 35 mph, and 38 mph with the power off. 15 aircraft were entered of which only two, the American Curtiss Tanager and the British Handley Page Gugnunc met the requirements. The Curtiss Tanager was awarded as the winner in dubious circumstances, and then Handley Page sued Curtiss for unlicensed use of Handley Page slats, and worse, neither of the finalists saw production or service afterwards; however, indirectly, the competition influenced designers in building safer aircraft.

=== Alaska ===
Guggenheim sparked controversy in the district of Alaska from 1906 onward. He was approached by Stephen Birch, a wealthy miner with ambitions for the development of Alaska and its railroads, in regards to financing Birch's developing copper claims. Guggenheim and his brother formed a gentlemen's agreement with Birch to form the Alaska Syndicate, which purchased just under half of the stock in Birch's company and all of the stock in the Copper River and Northwestern Railway. All of this sparked an "anti-Guggenheim" movement which was integral in political elections and appointments of 1908 in Alaska.

== See also ==
- Guggenheim family
