= Butler Blackhawk =

American 1929 3-seat Utility Biplane

Blackhawk
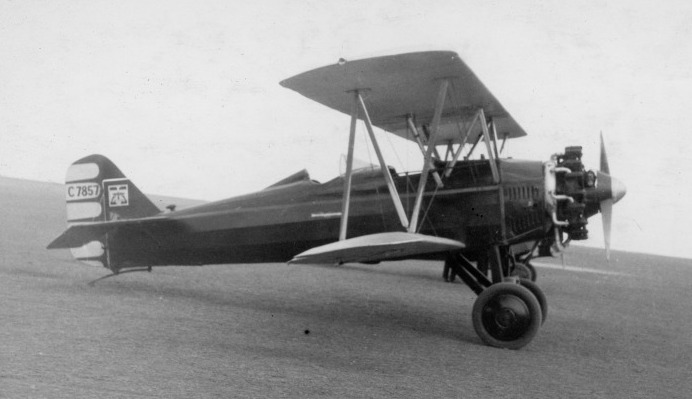

General information
- Type: Utility biplane
- National origin: United States
- Manufacturer: Butler Aircraft Corporation (Note: Subsidiary of Butler Manufacturing Corp.)
- Designer: Waverly M. Stearman
- Status: Retired
- Number built: 13 (Note: Number includes the second prototype Skyway, which was destroyed without having been registered, and the sole cabin variant.)

History
- Manufactured: 1928–1929
- Introduction date: 1929
- First flight: 4 October 1928

The Butler Blackhawk and the Skyway from which it was developed were American three-seat open-cockpit single engine biplanes of the late 1920s that were built in small numbers immediately prior to having their intended production run interrupted by the onset of the Great Depression.

== Design and development ==
The fuselage was built from chromium-molybdenum alloy steel tubing faired to shape with light wooden battens and covered in doped aircraft linen. Separate cockpits were provided for the pilot, in the rear, with the two passengers up front, with a baggage compartment behind the pilot. Unusually, the pilot was provided with dual engine controls, one on each side of the cockpit. Like the fuselage, the empennage was built up from welded chromium-molybdenum alloy steel and covered in fabric with the elevators being adjustable in flight from the cockpit.

The biplane wings were built up around two solid spruce spars with built-up plywood ribs forming the airfoil section. No center section was used, as the wing panels were joined along the centerline. While the main fuel tank was in the fuselage, it was supplemented with smaller gravity tanks in each upper wing root. Frise-type ailerons actuated by push-pull tubes were fitted to the lower wings only. It was fitted with a split-axle undercarriage.

== Variants ==
All variants were powered by a single 220 hp (160 kW) Wright J-5 Whirlwind air-cooled radial engine, although the prototype was initially reported as having a 200 hp (150 kW) J-5.

Skyway (ATC 2–49)
Prototype, two built, one (msn 101) destroyed before being licensed and one (msn 100, NX7857) converted to Blackhawk standard.
Coach
Cabin variant, one built (msn 102, NX146E).
Blackhawk (ATC 135)
Main variant, 11 built, including one converted from Skyway.
Leuthart D
Single Blackhawk (msn 112, NC14422) renamed by purchaser.

== Operational history ==
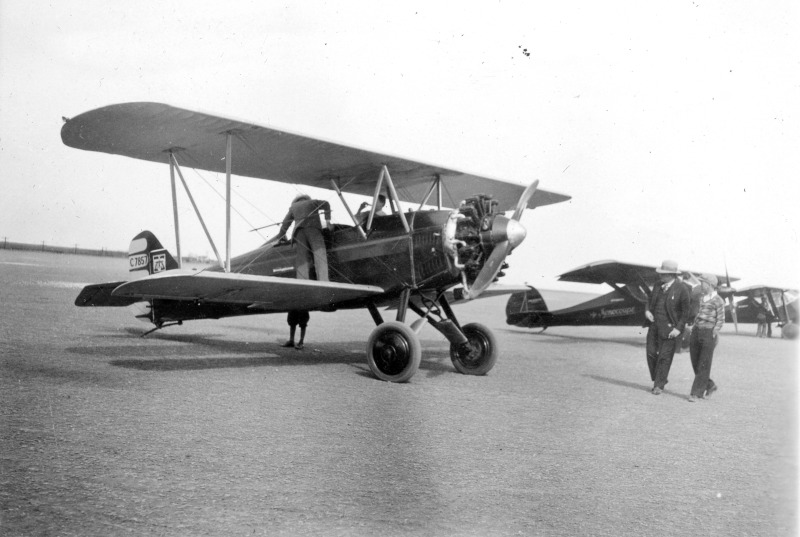
Butler Blackhawk with Monocoupe

Butler Manufacturing were producers of pre-fabricated steel buildings, including aircraft hangars who decided to expand into aircraft construction, however shortly after they begin production, the 1929 Stock Market Crash and the onset of the Great Depression began to severe impacted their profitability, both with their main line of business, and with regards to aviation and they almost immediately shut down their production line to preserve their core business. As a result, only 13 serial numbers were allocated.

Art Goebel, known as the winner of the disastrous Dole Air Race in which many of the entrants failed to survive, and for the aerobatic routines he carried out in a Waco ATO, made a test flight from Kansas City, Missouri to San Antonio, Texas in a Blackhawk, and liked it enough to buy one for his personal use.

Hoot Gibson, a famous 1920s and 1930s cowboy actor, bought Blackhawk NC730K serial 105, however, it was while flying a similar Swallow biplane borrowed from a friend that he crashed at the National Air Races in Los Angeles on 3 July 1933, and not the Blackhawk.

Some examples began being used as crop dusters at the end of the 1930s.

== Operators ==
United States

- National Airlines operated NC599H (msn 106) briefly, and mainly as a trainer.

Mexico

- Compañía Aeronáutica del Sur operated the first prototype (msn 100) as X-BAHH.

== Surviving aircraft ==
- Msn 110 N593H is currently registered and airworthy by a private owner with the FAA in Rockton, Illinois, and as last seen was painted black with yellow wings at the Kelch Aviation Museum in Brodhead, Wisconsin.
- Msn 111 NX299N is currently on display at the Science City at Union Station, suspended over the atrium and painted orange with cream wings and control surfaces.

== Specifications (Butler Blackhawk (ATC 135) ) ==
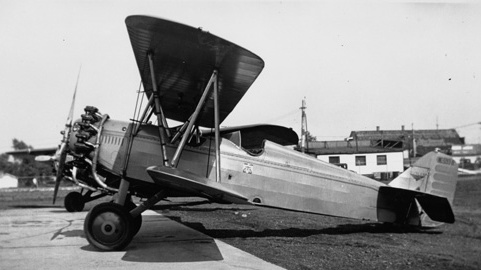
Butler Blackhawk

Data from U.S. Civil Aircraft Vol. 2 (ATC 101 – 200)

General characteristics

- Crew: One
- Capacity: Two
- Length: 24 ft 0 in (7.32 m)
- Upper wingspan: 34 ft 0 in (10.36 m) *Upper wing chord: 64 in (1.6 m)
- Lower wingspan: 28 ft 6 in (8.69 m) *Lower wing chord: 54 in (1.4 m)
- Height: 9 ft 0 in (2.74 m)
- Wing area: 295 sq ft (27.4 m^{2})

- Upper wing area: 180 sq ft (17 m^{2})
- Lower wing area: 115 sq ft (10.7 m^{2})

- Empty weight: 1,885 lb (855 kg)
- Gross weight: 2,900 lb (1,315 kg) *Useful load: 1,015 lb (460 kg)
- Fuel capacity: 70 US gal (260 L; 58 imp gal)
- Oil capacity: 8 US gal (30 L; 6.7 imp gal)
- Undercarriage track: 90 in (2.3 m)
- Powerplant: 1 × Wright J-5 Whirlwind air-cooled radial engine , 220 hp (160 kW)
- Propellers: 2-bladed metal fixed pitch propeller

Performance

- Maximum speed: 130 mph (210 km/h, 110 kn)
- Cruise speed: 110 mph (180 km/h, 96 kn) or 115 mph (185 km/h) if metal cover in place over front cockpit.
- Minimum control speed: 47 mph (76 km/h, 41 kn)
- Range: 650 mi (1,050 km, 560 nmi) at cruising speed
- Service ceiling: 14,000 ft (4,300 m)
- Time to altitude: 60 seconds to 1,000 ft (300 m)
- Wing loading: 8.06 lb/sq ft (39.4 kg/m^{2})
- Power loading: 13.25 lb/hp (8.06 kg/kW)
- Fuel consumption: 0.629 lb/mi (0.177 kg/km) (Note: Minimum, based on fuel burn rate of 11.5 US gal (44 L; 9.6 imp gal)/hour at the 110 mph (180 km/h) cruise speed and a weight of 6.02 lb/US gal (0.721 kg/L) for aviation gasoline, such as for 100LL and 80/87 fuels)
- Fuel consumption: 11.5 US gal (44 L; 9.6 imp gal)/hour

== See also ==
- 1928 in aviation

=== Aircraft of comparable role, configuration and era ===
- Brunner-Winkle Bird
- Command-Aire 3C3
- Parks P-1
- Pheasant H-10
- Waco ASO

=== Related lists ===
- List of civil aircraft
