= Climber Motor Company =

Defunct American motor vehicle manufacturer

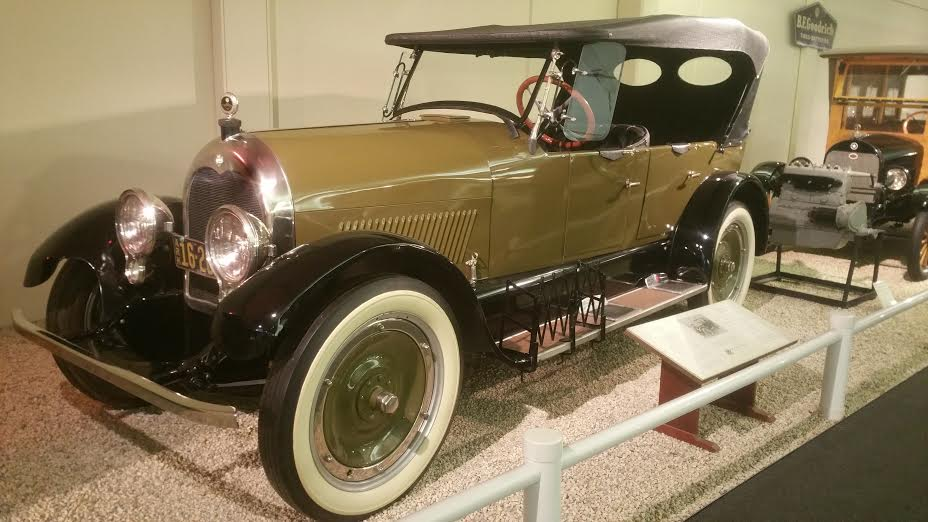
- 1923 Climber Model 6-50
- Industry: Vehicle manufacture
- Founded: 1919
- Founder: William Drake, Clarence Roth, and David Hopson
- Defunct: 1924
- Headquarters: Little Rock, Arkansas, U.S.
- Products: Automobiles

The Climber Motor Company was a short-lived automobile manufacturer based in Little Rock, Arkansas. Sales were targeted at the Southern United States such as Mississippi, Oklahoma, Tennessee and Arkansas. It is the only car ever produced in Arkansas.

The Climber Motor Corporation hired George Schoeneck, previously involved with the Owen-Schoeneck and Geneva automobiles, as its Chief Engineer. Production started in 1919 with two models - the four-cylinder Model K and the six-cylinder Model S. Tourer; roadster and coupe body styles were offered for both models. Prices ranged from $1385 to $2400 for the Model K, and from $2250 to $3250 for the Model S.

Lack of parts and finance led to the company's sale in mid-1924. The New Climber Company built approximately 200 cars from available parts, then wound the business up. Part of the Climber Motor Car Factory, Unit A, is listed on the National Register of Historic Places since 2005.

Between 75 and 100 commercial vehicles were produced.
