= Handley Page Gugnunc =

Wooden biplane used in the 1930s

H.P.39 "Gugnunc"
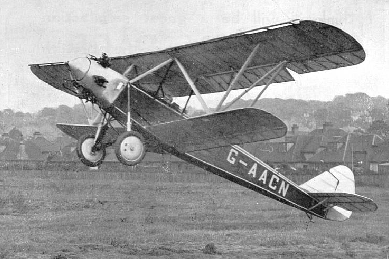

General information
- Type: Experimental utility
- Manufacturer: Handley Page
- Number built: 1

History
- First flight: 1929
- Retired: 1934

The Handley Page H.P.39 is a wooden biplane that was constructed in 1929. The aircraft was intended to compete in a competition proposed by the Daniel Guggenheim Fund for the Promotion of Aeronautics - the Guggenheim Safe Aircraft Competition. The original working name for the aircraft was the Guggenheim Competition Biplane. The name Gugnunc was at first unofficial, coming from the Pip, Squeak and Wilfred newspaper cartoon (in the Daily Mirror and later in silent films), but it later became official.

== Construction and operation ==
Only one example of the type was constructed, and it was allotted civil registration G-AACN. It used slots and flaps to achieve the necessary low speed and short takeoff and landing distances for the various Guggenheim prizes.

The aircraft competed in the competition in 1929. Most of the competitors failed to enter due to mechanical problems or failure to satisfy the organizers' safety checks. The Gugnunc performed adequately but did not win any prizes.

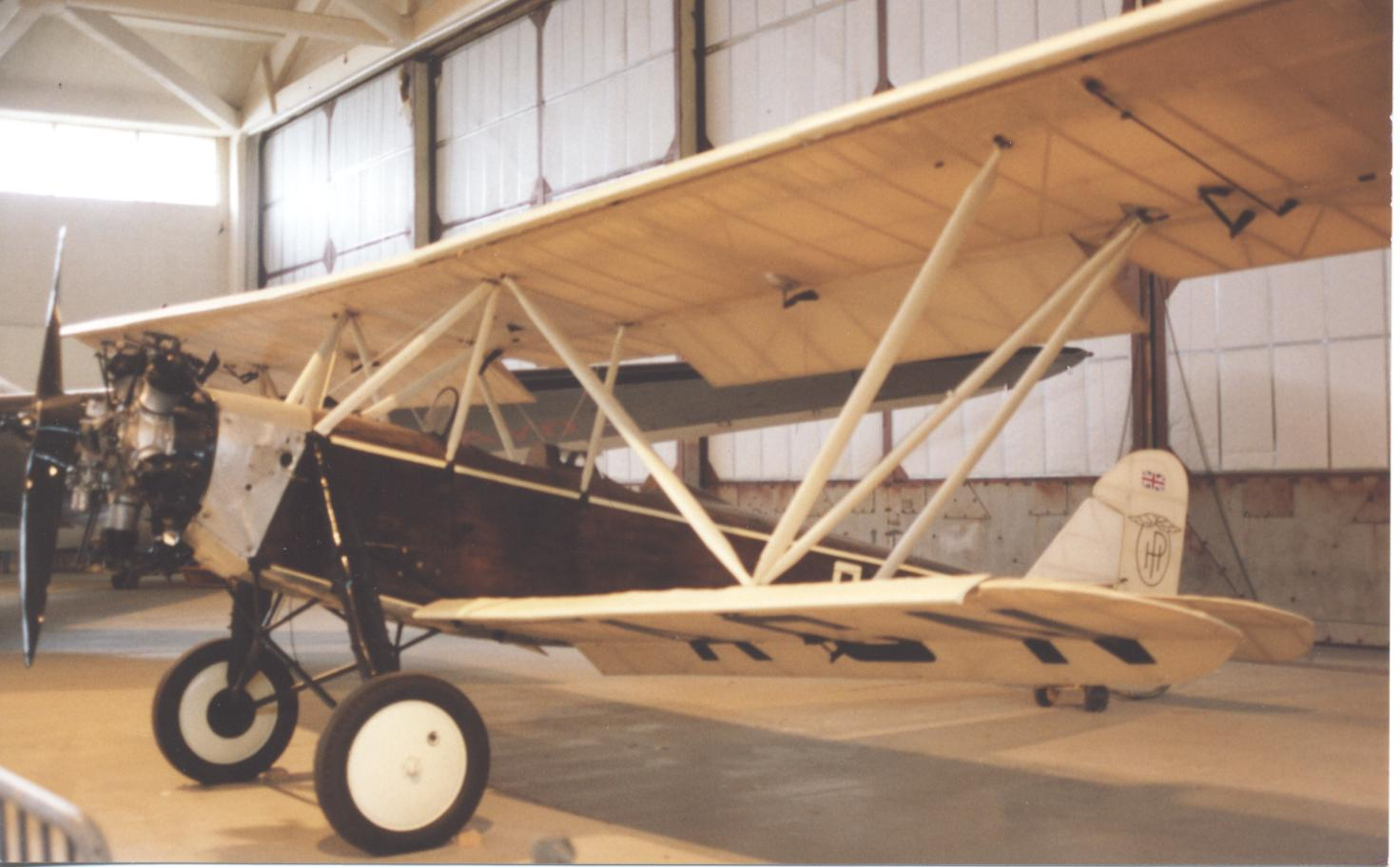
The HP.39 Gugnunc preserved by the Science Museum at Wroughton airfield, Wiltshire, in July 1992

While at the competition, the Handley Page team noticed that the Curtiss competitors were using an unlicensed version of the Handley Page slot. In the following legal battles, the Curtiss lawyers brought up a postwar judgement that foreign aircraft (and particularly Handley Page aircraft) were prohibited from being imported into the US.

On return to the UK, the aircraft continued experimental flying, was ultimately purchased by the Air Ministry, given registration K1908, and was allocated to the Royal Aircraft Establishment for further testing. The aircraft was struck off in 1934 and presented to the Science Museum. In 2016 it was installed as the centrepiece of the Winton Gallery of the museum. The curved overhead structure and layout of the gallery, designed by Dame Zaha Hadid represents the airflow around the aircraft.

== Specifications (H.P.39) ==
Data from British civil aircraft since 1919 Volume II, Handley Page aircraft since 1907

General characteristics

- Crew: 2
- Length: 26 ft 9 in (8.15 m)
- Wingspan: 40 ft (12 m)
- Wing area: 293 sq ft (27.2 m^{2})
- Airfoil: RAF 28
- Empty weight: 1,362 lb (618 kg)
- Gross weight: 2,180 lb (989 kg)
- Fuel capacity: 32 imp gal (38 US gal; 145 L)
- Powerplant: 1 × Armstrong Siddeley Mongoose I 5-cylinder air-cooled radial piston engine, 150 hp (110 kW)
- Propellers: 2-bladed fixed-pitch propeller

Performance

- Maximum speed: 112.5 mph (181.1 km/h, 97.8 kn)
- Minimum speed: 33.5 mph (29.1 kn; 53.9 km/h)
- Cruise speed: 97 mph (156 km/h, 84 kn)
- Rate of climb: 730 ft/min (3.7 m/s)

== See also ==
Aircraft of comparable role, configuration, and era

- Curtiss Tanager

Related lists

- List of experimental aircraft
