= Daniel Guggenheim Fund for the Promotion of Aeronautics =

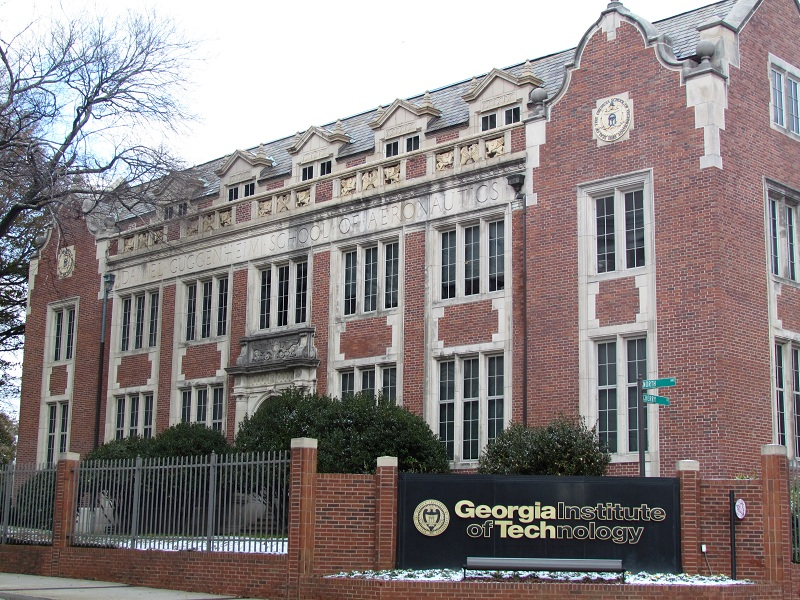
Guggenheim Aerospace Building on the Main campus of the Georgia Institute of Technology

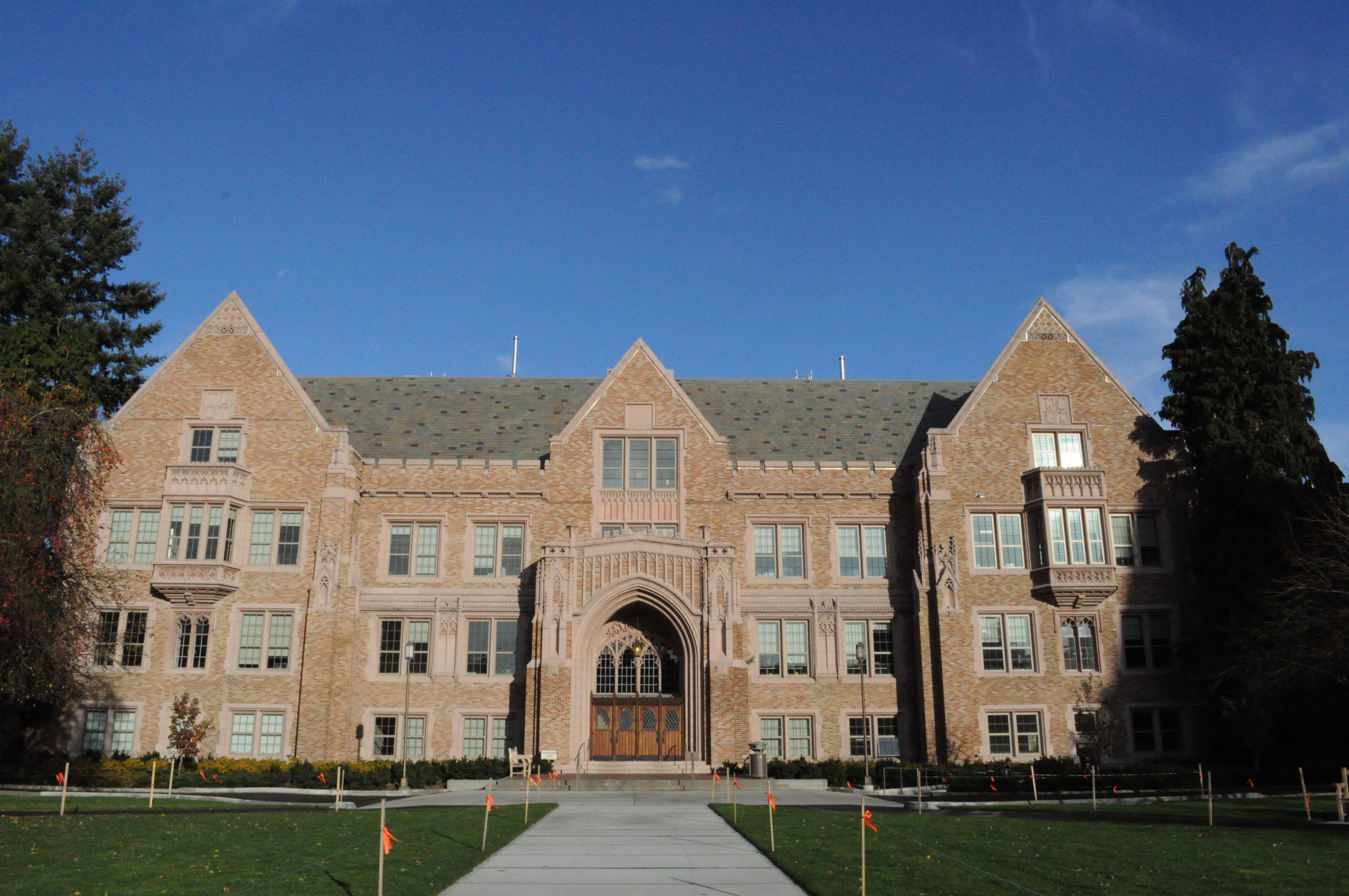
Guggenheim Hall at the University of Washington

The Daniel Guggenheim Fund for the Promotion of Aeronautics was established by Daniel Guggenheim and his son, Harry Guggenheim on June 16, 1926. Between 1926 and 1930 the fund disbursed $3 million, making grants that established schools or research centers at New York University, Stanford University, the University of Michigan, the Massachusetts Institute of Technology, the University of Washington, the Georgia Institute of Technology, Harvard University, Syracuse University, Northwestern University, the University of Akron, and the California Institute of Technology. From mid July to late October, 1927, the fund also sponsored a 22,350-mile flying tour of the US by Charles Lindbergh and the Spirit of St. Louis after his solo non-stop flight from New York to Paris on May 20–21, 1927. The Guggenheim Tour included visits to 82 cities in all 48 states during which Lindbergh delivered 147 speeches promoting aviation.
