= James S. McDonnell Foundation =

St. Louis based foundation for research and scholarship

- Formation: 1950
- Founder: James S. McDonnell
- Location: Saint Louis, Missouri, U.S.

The James S. McDonnell Foundation was founded in 1950 by aerospace pioneer James S. McDonnell. It was established to "improve the quality of life," and does so by contributing to the generation of new knowledge through its support of research and scholarship. Originally called the McDonnell Foundation, the organization was renamed the James S. McDonnell Foundation in 1984 in honor of its founder. The foundation is based in St. Louis, Missouri.

The Foundation is a member of the Brain Tumor Funders' Collaborative, a partnership among eight private philanthropic and advocacy organizations designed to bridge the “translational gap” that prevents promising laboratory science from yielding new medical treatments. Fair market value of Foundation assets were around $609 million in 2007. Susan M. Fitzpatrick was named president beginning 2015.

== Grants ==
In 2004, the Foundation awarded approximately $15.5 million in grants. Since its inception, the McDonnell Foundation has awarded over $295 million in grants. Grants are awarded via the Foundation-initiated, peer-reviewed proposal processes through the 21st Century Science Initiative. This initiative supports scientific, educational, and charitable causes on a local, national, and international level. For instance for research related to cancer, or climate change.
