= 90 Days (video report) =

- 90 Days VHS box cover from episode Number 6
- Genre: Business
- Country of origin: United States
- Original language: English
- No. of episodes: 26

Production
- Running time: 30 minutes (appx.) William L. Mund- Writer, interviewer, director John Mosbacher- Videographer, graphics, editor

Original release
- Release: September 1989 – February 1996

90 Days was a video news magazine produced by McDonnell Douglas in St. Louis, MO and distributed at the end of every business quarter (hence the show's title) through the mail to employees and shareholders of the company in VHS format. From its inception in September 1989 until the final episode in 1996 under the "90 Days" title, the program routinely featured segments about employees and company programs or products, all while incorporating a review of financial results from the previous quarter. An example clip from the program can currently be found on the video website YouTube. It was "a video report about issues, events and people important to you and McDonnell Douglas."

== Overview ==
As Mr. McDonnell explains in "Number 1," the purpose behind going to the expense of producing and distributing 90 Days was to facilitate better communication between the company and its employees and shareholders. In fact, the first episode came with a postcard so viewers could share their comments on the show, and a special mailing address was established for comments throughout the life of the program. When "Number 1" debuted, the company was in the midst of a major transition, and at the time this was an innovative form of communication that served as an insight into the company's direction.

=== Hosts ===
Over the course of the program's production, 90 Days had three hosts:

- John McDonnell (episodes 1-17)
- Harry Stonecipher (episodes 18-25)
- Guest host (episode 26)

== Episodes ==
Each episode of 90 Days was named according to its numerical order in the series, and featured a summary of that episode either on the reverse of the VHS video cover (early episodes) or printed on a label on the video itself (episodes after "Number 17").

No.	Title	Date	Host	Runtime
1	Number 1	Sept. 1989	John McDonnell	23:35
A visit to the Douglas Aircraft Company (DAC) in Long Beach, CA to meet an McDonnell Douglas MD-80 assembly team thriving under TQMS; Financial performance review; DAC's Dale Warren comments on the McDonnell Douglas DC-10 in the wake of the Flight 232 tragedy; A feature on F-15E service reps at Seymour Johnson AFB, North Carolina.
2	Number 2	Dec. 1989	John McDonnell	30:45
Members of the Torrance, CA parts manufacturing team take a field trip to Long Beach to see how their parts help shape the McDonnell Douglas MD-80; Third quarter financial performance review; A look into how assembly team members at McDonnell Douglas Helicopter Company improved efficiency in building the Apache; A look at the first commercial launch of a satellite by a private United States company, the Space Systems Company use of the Delta rocket in Huntington Beach, California; A celebration of McDonnell Aircraft Company's 50th Anniversary.
3	Number 3	March 1990	John McDonnell	30 minutes
A visit to the McDonnell Douglas Missile Systems Company's training center; financial performance review; Engineering and manufacturing teams prepare the McDonnell Douglas MD-11 for first flight; How teamwork is leading to faster solutions on the F-15E production line; A feature on the Navy's Blue Angels
4	Number 4	June 1990	John McDonnell	30 minutes
A visit to MAC to see examine how a partnership has been built between labor and management; A review of first quarter financial results, and a discussion of the challenges and opportunities the company faces; The military commanders of plant representative offices give their perspective on MDC's performance
5	Number 5	Sept. 1990	John McDonnell	32:40
A look at the issues, questions and emotions surrounding recent corporate-wide cost reductions; Chairman John McDonnell discusses second quarter results; Techniques being tried at the Space Systems Company in Huntington Beach to improve white-collar productivity; Meet the first winners of the Spirit of Excellence Award
6	Number 6	Dec. 1990	John McDonnell	30 minutes
Representative from American Airlines, Finnair, and Delta Air Lines comment on the performance of MDC's commercial jetliners; Third quarter financial performance review; An in-depth look at the YF-23 Advanced Tactical Fighter as MCAIR's Bill Lowe pilots it on its first supersonic flight; A visit to Douglas Aircraft's Flight Test Facility in Yuma, Arizona for the story of the non-stop efforts to secure the McDonnell Douglas MD-11's FAA certification
7	Number 7	March 1991	John McDonnell	30 minutes
A visit to Motorola to learn how their quest for first-time quality and customer satisfaction earned them the Malcolm Baldrige Award; 1990 financial results and fourth quarter highlights; A stop by the Missile Company's Harpoon Depot to examine how reducing cycle time speeds up repairs and retrofits on the formidable weapon
8	Number 8	June 1991	John McDonnell	30 minutes
How statistical process control techniques are improving productivity at McDonnell Aircraft's Machining Center; A tour of the McDonnell Douglas Research Laboratories; Field service representative Kirt Brown relates his experiences in Operation Desert Storm, and the outstanding performance of the Apache during the conflict; A review of first quarter financial performance
9	Number 9	Sept. 1991	John McDonnell	30 minutes
How MCAIR fixes parts that don't fit properly on the F/A-18; Test pilot Bill Casey & assembly manager Steve Waltman take 90 Days through final preparations before the C-17's first flight; The winners of the Spirit of Excellence Award; Second quarter financial results
10	Number 10	Dec. 1991	John McDonnell	37:04
John McDonnell discusses the McDonnell Douglas MD-12 program, and gives third quarter financial results; A visit to the Electronic Systems Company to learn about lasers and microphotonics; A ride along with test pilot Bill Casey for the C-17's first flight
11	Number 11	March 1992	John McDonnell	30 minutes
How the criteria for the Malcolm Baldrige National Quality Award is used to measure MDC's TQMS progress; 1991 financial results; CFO Herb Lanese explains why better asset management & inventory control are essential to profitability & competitiveness; A tour of Space Station Freedom via the Space Systems Company
12	Number 12	June 1992	John McDonnell	30 minutes
A visit to Douglas Aircraft's Macon, Georgia facility to see employees work in self-managed groups and participate in running the plant; First quarter financial results in addition to an update of the McDonnell Douglas MD-12 program; How MDC is improving first-time quality by building better relationship with a smaller number of preferred suppliers; The T-45 Goshawk undergoing sea trials on the USS John F. Kennedy aircraft carrier
13	Number 13	Sept. 1992	John McDonnell	30 minutes
MCAIR's new systems and process to help improve program management on the Super Hornet; The winners of 1992's McDonnell Douglas Spirit of Excellent Award; A visit to the Space Systems Company at Kennedy Space Center to see how they put payload aboard the Space Shuttle; Second quarter financial performance
14	Number 14	Dec. 1992	John McDonnell	30 minutes
A visit to the McDonnell Douglas MD-11 production line to examine how new systems and processes are helping reduce costs, improve quality, and putting the program back on schedule; A behind the scenes look at efforts to test the C-17 for the rigors of military operations; A review of third quarter financial results
15	Number 15	March 1993	John McDonnell	30 minutes
Meet the new AV-8B Harrier II, and learn how Integrated Product Definition contributed to its successful first flight one month ahead of schedule; 1992 financial results, and the findings of the 2nd annual TQMS improvement evaluation; A report about light-weight composite parts
16	Number 16	June 1993	John McDonnell	30 minutes
See the first flight of the McDonnell Douglas MD-12 takes place in Long Beach, CA, and meet some of the people behind its development; Learn about the new DC-X; First quarter financial results
17	Number 17	Sept. 1993	John McDonnell	30 minutes
A look at the T45 Training System in action at Naval Air Station Kingsville; TQMS groups thriving at the Salt Lake City, Utah facility where MD-80 & MD-11 parts are made; The winners of the annual Spirit of Excellence awards; Second quarter financial results
18	Number 18	Dec. 1993	?	?
summary: unknown
19	Number 19	March 1994	Harry Stonecipher	30 minutes
F/A-18E/F Super Hornet update; Improving the McDonnell Douglas MD-11 via design; A flight aboard a DC-3; 1993 financial results
20	Number 20	June 1994	Harry Stonecipher	30 minutes
MDC helps introduce the C-17 into the USAF's fleet at Charleston Air Force Base; A T-45 team tackles manufacturing problems by measuring defects per unit; First quarter financial results
21	Number 21	Sept. 1994	Harry Stonecipher	30 minutes
A customer assessment of performance & how it's being improved with Process Action Teams; 1993's Spirit of Excellence Award winners; Second quarter financial highlights; The Annual Meeting product & '93 highlights video
22	Number 22	Dec. 1994	Harry Stonecipher	30 minutes
A look at the Navy's "Desert Bogeys" squadron; A feature about the MD Explorer NOTAR system helicopter; Stereo lithography used to make prototypes rapidly; Third quarter financial results
23	Number 23	March 1995	Harry Stonecipher	30 minutes
Learn why and how the 16th production C-17 was delivered ahead of schedule; FAA certification of the McDonnell Douglas MD-90; A look at the Phantom Works; 1994 financial results and the results of the 4th annual TQMS-IE
24	Number 24	June 1995	Harry Stonecipher	30 minutes
Redesigned video cover from Number 24: An interview with Laurie Broedling, the new VP of human resources; Testing the McDonnell Douglas MD-11 before customer delivery; A look at new wind tunnel technology; First quarter financial results
25	Number 25	Sept. 1995	Harry Stonecipher	36 minutes
MDC helicopters help the Phoenix Police Department maintain law and order; The Phantom Works finds new ways to build airplanes faster, better, and more affordably; Meet 1994's Spirit of Excellence Award winners; Second-quarter financial results and highlights
26	Number 26 - F/A-18E/F Super Hornet: A 90 Days Special Report	Feb. 1996	?	?
VHS cover from the Super Hornet special report: The story of the Navy's next generation fighter and the revolutionary new way we build it

== Legacy of 90 Days ==
There are not any known plans to restart 90 Days or its successor, Flight Times TV, by Boeing.
