= Command-Aire =

Aircraft Manufacturer

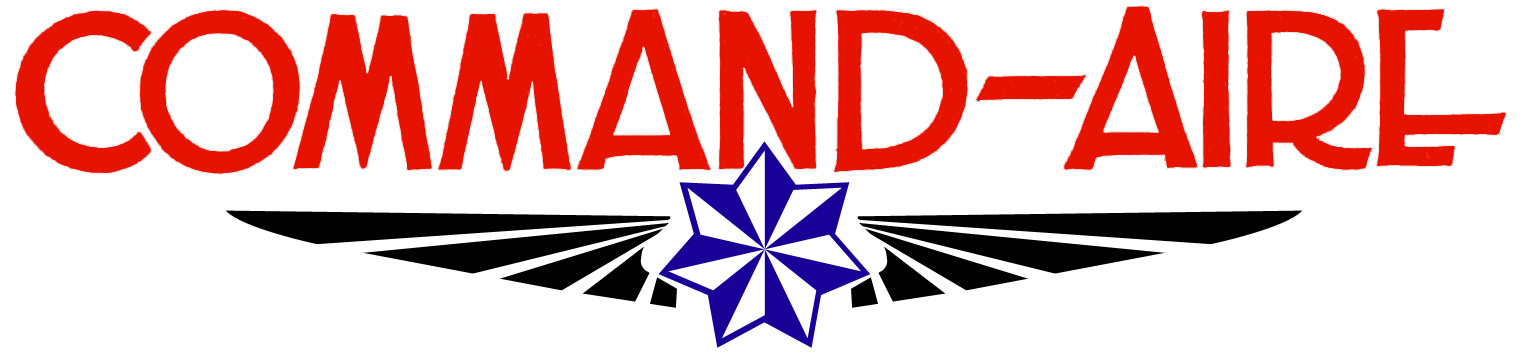
- Formerly: Arkansas Aircraft Corporation
- Industry: Aerospace
- Predecessor: Arkansas Aircraft Company
- Founded: 1926; 100 years ago
- Founders: Major J. Carroll Cone; W. F. Moody
- Defunct: 1931; 95 years ago
- Fate: Bankrupt
- Headquarters: Little Rock, Arkansas, United States
- Key people: Albert Vollmecke; Robert B. Snowden
- Products: Aircraft

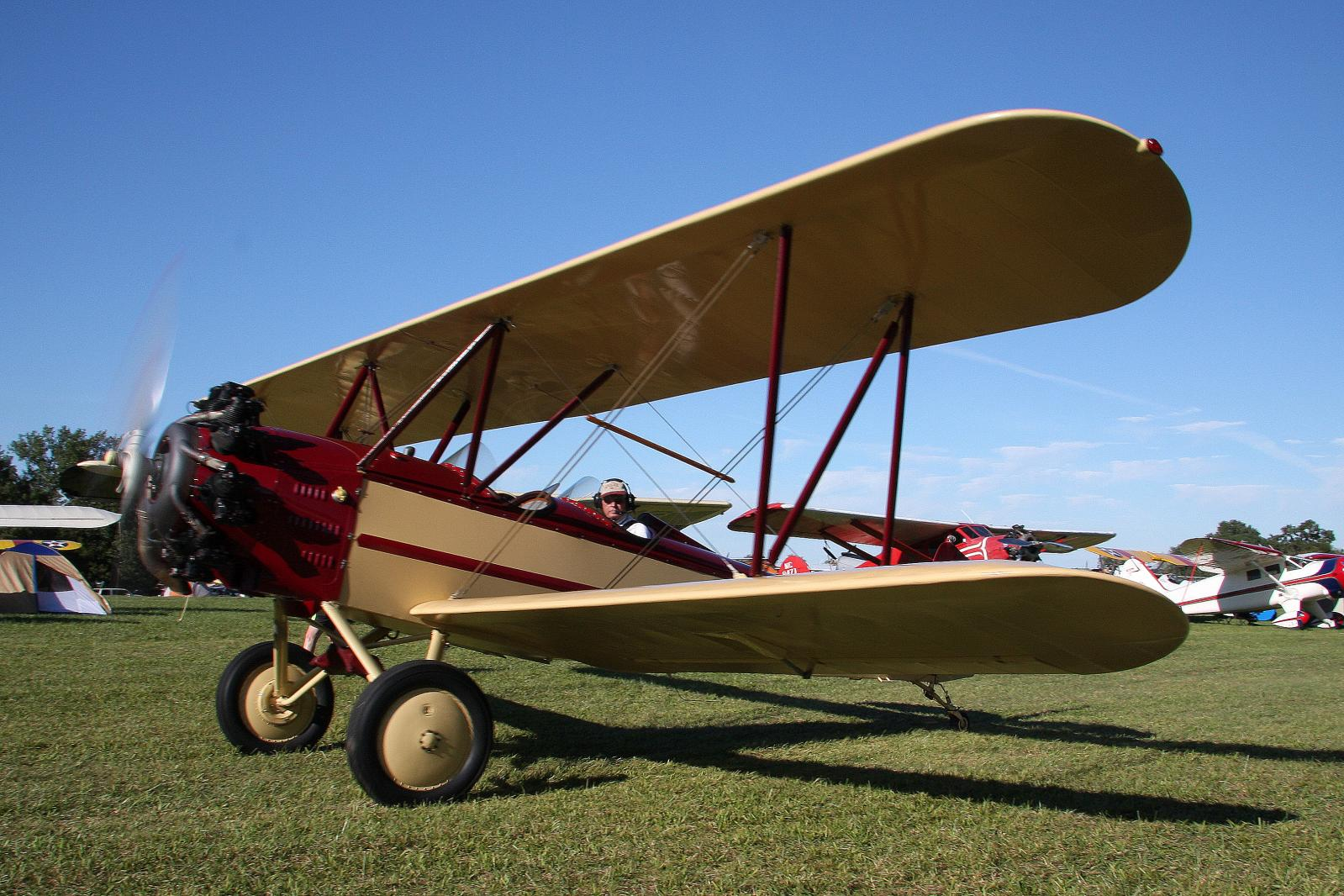
Command-Aire 5C3 N997E

The Command-Aire was an American aircraft manufacturer from the late 1920s and early 1930s based in Little Rock, Arkansas.

== History ==
The company was founded on August 26, 1926 by Major J. Carroll Cone and W. F. Moody as the Arkansas Aircraft Corporation. Aircraft were built in the former Climber Motor Company Factory at 1823 East 17th Street in Little Rock, Arkansas. After a failed attempt by their first engineer to produce their design, they attempted to arrange the purchase of a production licence for the Heinkel HD 40, and when that fell through they hired a Heinkel engineer, Albert Vollmecke, who would be responsible for the rest of the company's designs. In September 1928, the company was purchased by Robert B. Snowden and the name was changed to Command-Aire. With rapidly declining sales due to the Great Depression, and with no acceptable offers for a merger, the company declared bankruptcy in 1931 and its remaining assets were sold off.

== Aircraft ==
Model name	1st flight	ATC #	No. built	Type
Glider	1928	n/a	1	glider (NX3895)
3C3	1928	ATC 53, 2-201	178 or 179	three seat biplane
4C3	1929	n/a	1	Prototype two-seat biplane
5C3	1929	ATC 184, 2-251	63 or 64	three seat biplane
BS-14	1930	ATC 2-204	1	Prototype two-seat training biplane
BS-16	1930	n/a	2	Prototype three-seat training biplane
MR-1 Little Rocket	1930	n/a	1	Single-seat racing monoplane
