= Curtiss Tanager =

Tanager
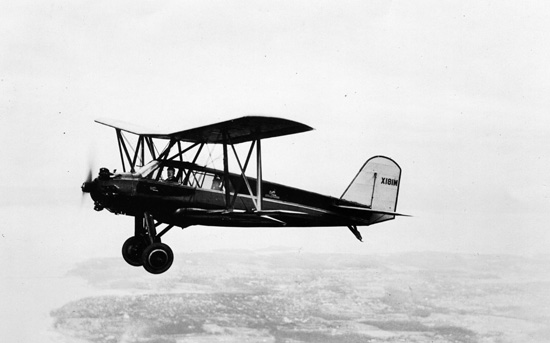

General information
- Type: Technology demonstrator
- Manufacturer: Curtiss
- Designer: Robert R. Osborn and Theodore Paul Wright
- Number built: 1

History
- First flight: 12 October 1929

The Curtiss Model 54 Tanager was an aircraft constructed in 1929 as Curtiss' entry in the Guggenheim Safe Aircraft Competition.

== Design and development ==
The Model 54 was a conventional biplane design with a highly streamlined fuselage similar in outline to the Curtiss Eagle, but of considerably smaller proportions. The wings were fitted with a variety of high-lift devices, including automatic leading edge slots on the upper wing, flaps that extended along the entire span of the upper wing, and "floating" ailerons on the lower wing that, in the absence of pilot input, automatically adjusted themselves parallel to the airflow over the wing. The combination of these devices gave the Tanager a stalling speed of just 31 mph (50 km/h) and allowed it to land in only 90 ft (27 m).

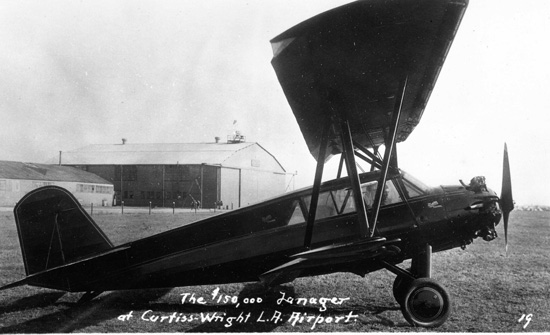
Curtiss Tanager

Only the Tanager and the Handley Page Gugnunc passed the qualifying round of the competition, and ultimately the Tanager beat its rival by only one point to claim the $100,000 (£20,000) prize, since the Gugnunc failed to achieve a minimum speed below 38 mph. Even before the competition was decided, however, Handley Page was suing Curtiss for the unlicensed use of the leading-edge slot. Curtiss claimed they were using the slots experimentally and would apply for a license for any commercial use. Curtiss counter-sued Handley Page for infringements of six of their patents in the Handley Page machine. They also cited a ruling that the British machine was not permitted to be imported into the US.

Following the competition, the Tanager was destroyed in a fire when sparks from its engine set the grass alight.

== Specifications ==
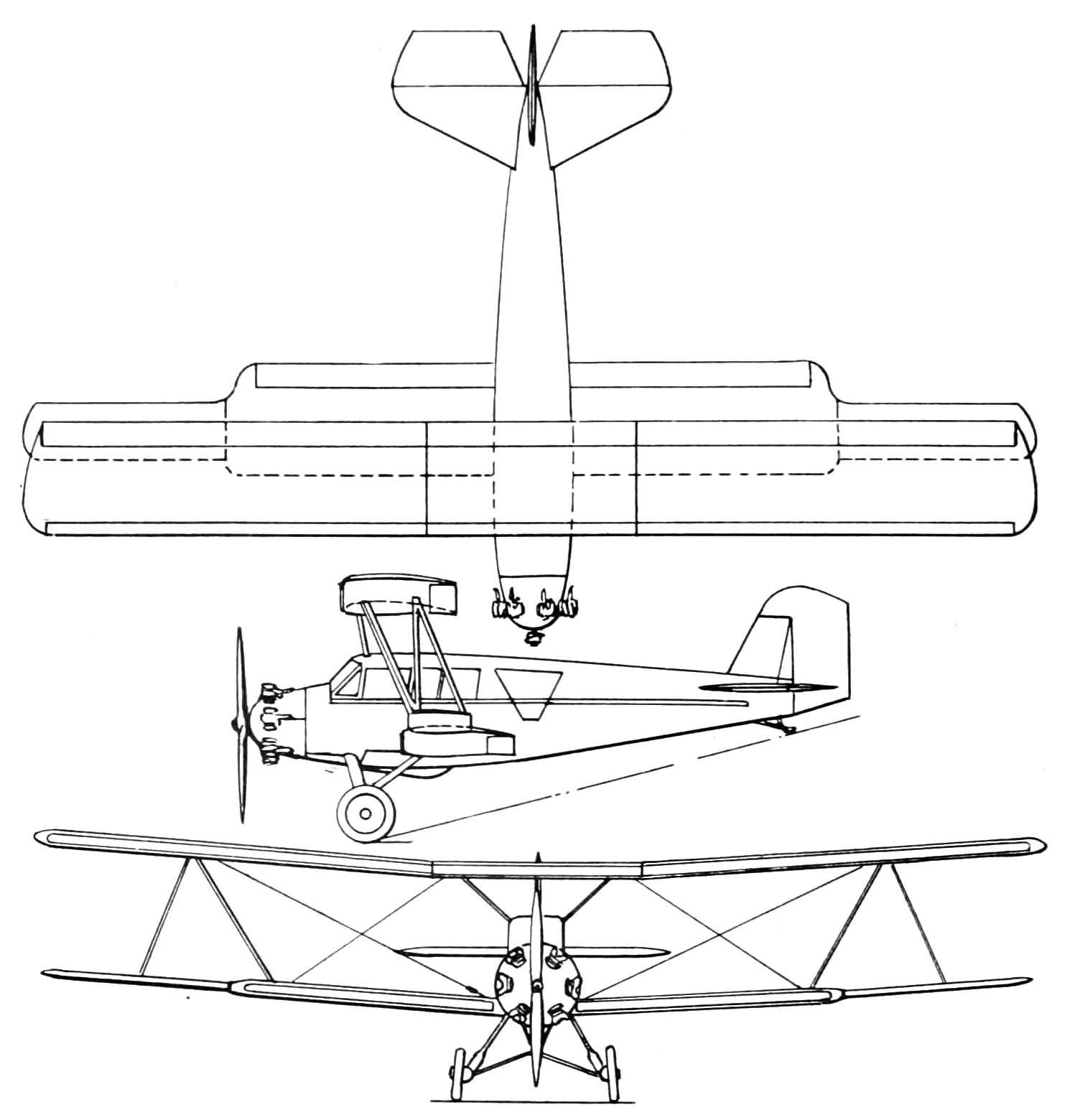
Curtiss Tanager 3-view drawing from Aero Digest February,1930

Data from Curtiss Aircraft 1907–1947

General characteristics

- Crew: 1
- Capacity: 2 pax
- Length: 26 ft 8 in (8.13 m)
- Wingspan: 43 ft 10 in (13.36 m)
- Height: 11 ft 4 in (3.45 m)
- Wing area: 333 sq ft (30.9 m^{2})
- Airfoil: Curtiss C-72
- Empty weight: 1,959 lb (889 kg)
- Gross weight: 2,841 lb (1,289 kg)
- Powerplant: 1 × Curtiss R-600 Challenger 6-cylinder air-cooled radial piston engine, 185 hp (138 kW)
- Propellers: 2-bladed propeller

Performance

- Maximum speed: 112 mph (180 km/h, 97 kn)
- Cruise speed: 95 mph (153 km/h, 83 kn)
- Landing speed: 37 mph (32 kn; 60 km/h)
- Range: 535 mi (861 km, 465 nmi)
- Service ceiling: 12,500 ft (3,800 m)
- Rate of climb: 700 ft/min (3.6 m/s)

== See also ==
Aircraft of comparable role, configuration, and era

- McDonnell Doodlebug a competitor in the contest

== Bibliography ==
- Bowers, Peter M. (1979). Curtiss Aircraft 1907–1947. London: Putnam. ISBN 0-370-10029-8.
- Taylor, Michael J. H. (1989). Jane's Encyclopedia of Aviation. London: Studio Editions. p. 278.
- Time 6 January 1930
