= American Champion Scout =

Two-seat, high-wing, single-engined airplane

8GCBC Scout
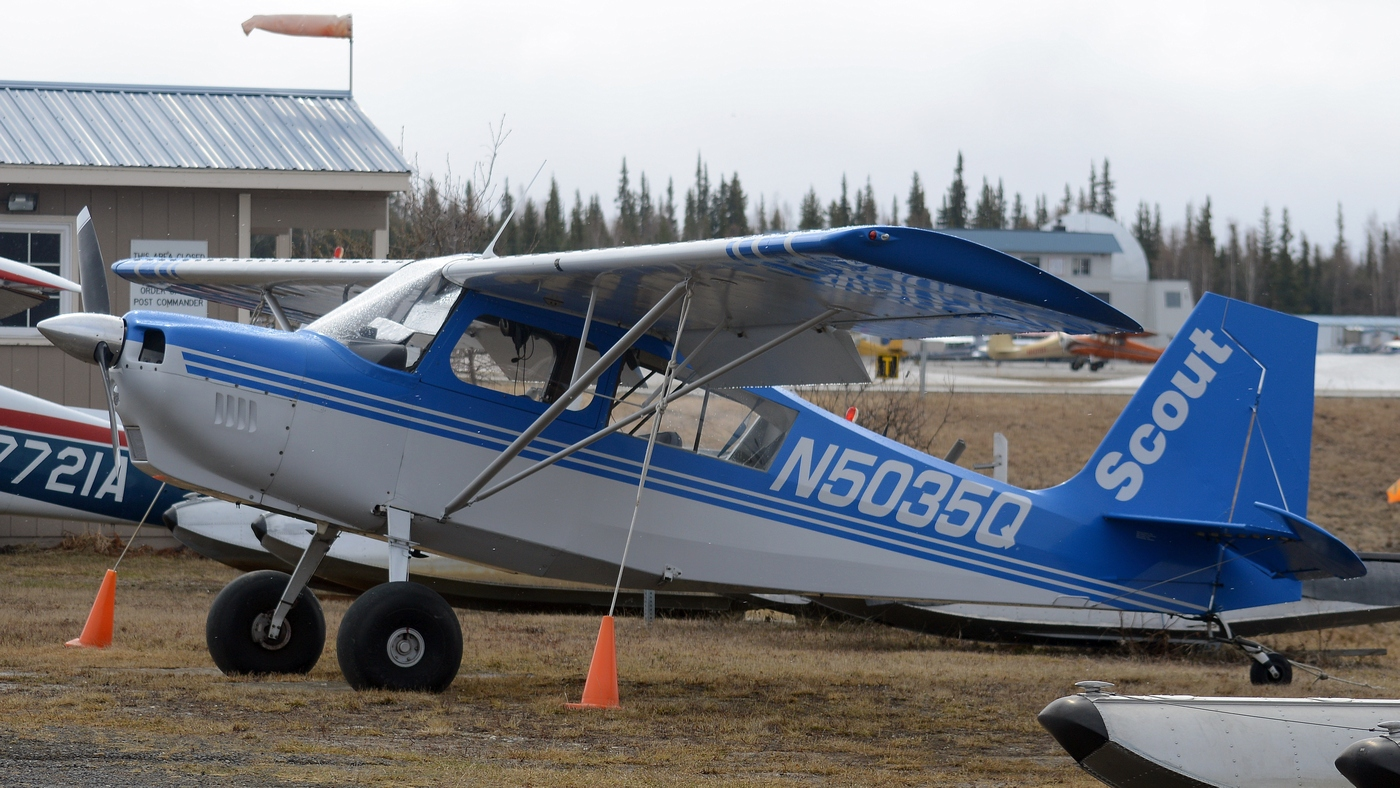
- Bellanca 8GCBC Scout

General information
- Type: Light utility aircraft
- Manufacturer: American Champion Aircraft
- Designer: Bellanca
- Number built: more than 500, as of 2008

History
- Introduction date: 1974

The 8GCBC Scout is a two-seat, high-wing, single-engined fixed conventional gear general aviation airplane that entered production in the United States in 1974. Designed for personal and commercial use, it is commonly found in utility roles such as bush flying—thanks to its short takeoff and landing (STOL) ability—as well as agriculture, pipeline patrol, and glider and banner towing.

== Development ==
The Scout was designed and initially produced by Bellanca Aircraft Corporation, and is a derivative of the 7-series Citabrias and 8KCAB Decathlon; Bellanca had been building these designs since receiving them in the acquisition of Champion Aircraft Corporation in 1970. The Scout is one of two wholly Bellanca-developed contributions to these aircraft series, and is also one of only two airplanes Bellanca produced in the 7 and 8 series not certified for aerobatics. (The other model, in both categories, is the 7ACA.) The Scout carries the model designation 8GCBC, which makes it both a sibling of the 8KCAB Decathlon and descendant of the 7GCBC Citabria. Bellanca produced more than 350 Scouts before production ended when the company's assets were liquidated in 1981.

The Scout design passed through the hands of a number of companies through the 1980s, including a Champion Aircraft Company, which was unrelated to the Champion Aircraft of the 1960s. In that period, only one Scout was built, in 1984. American Champion Aircraft Corporation acquired the Scout design, along with the Decathlon and the group of Citabria and Champ variants, in 1990 and brought the Scout back into production in 1993.

ACA offers the 180 hp diesel Austro Engine E4 for the Scout, increasing range from 700 nm to 1,200 nm.

== Design ==
The Scout traces its lineage back to the Aeronca Champ, by way of the Citabria. Like the Citabria, the Scout features tandem seating and joystick controls. The fuselage and tail surfaces are constructed of welded metal tubing. The outer shape of the fuselage is created by a combination of wooden formers and longerons, covered with fabric. The cross-section of the metal fuselage truss is triangular, a design feature traceable to the earliest Aeronca C-2 design of the late 1920s.

The strut-braced wings of the Scout are, like the fuselage and tail surfaces, fabric covered, utilizing aluminum alloy ribs. The wings of Bellanca Scouts were built with wooden spars. American Champion has been using aluminum spars in the aircraft it has produced and has, as well, made the aluminum-spar wings available for retrofit installation on older aircraft. Compared to the Citabria's wingspan of 33.5 feet (10.2 m), the Scout's wingspan is significantly wider, at over 36 feet (11 m). The Scout also carries wing flaps, a design feature it shares with the 7GCBC variant of the Citabria. The added wing area and the flaps contribute to the Scout's STOL abilities and its capacity as a utility aircraft.

The landing gear of the Scout is in a conventional arrangement. The main gear legs of most Scouts are made of spring steel, though American Champion began to use aluminum gear legs in 2004. Compared to the Citabria's gear, the Scout's gear legs are considerably taller and the tires larger, again contributing to its capabilities as a utility aircraft.

Bellanca made the Scout available with several Lycoming O-360 engine variants, all of 180 horsepower (134 kW), with the choice of a fixed-pitch or constant speed propeller. American Champion's Scouts feature the Lycoming O-360-C1G and a choice of a two-blade constant speed propeller (standard) or a three-blade constant speed propeller as an option.

== Operational history ==
The success in utility roles of the 150 horsepower (110 kW) Citabrias, both the 7GCAA and particularly the 7GCBC—the Scout's closest relative in the Citabria line—was the impetus for Bellanca's creation of the Scout, with its greater wing area, larger engine, better ground clearance, and higher gross weight and useful load. Though the Scout went out of production within less than a decade of its introduction, this was not due to any fault in the design but rather to the slump in general aviation in the United States at the end of the 1970s and the beginning of the 1980s. Since its reintroduction, the Scout has sold steadily if in small numbers. Scouts remain popular as bush planes—including versions fitted with floats or skis, for glider and banner towing, for pipeline patrol, in agricultural uses, and as personal aircraft. The largest single operator of the type the Royal Canadian Air Cadet League, operating over 20 of them in Ontario and the Prairie provinces as tow aircraft for glider training.

Another large operator is Western Australia's Department of Biodiversity, Conservation and Attractions (DBCA), who operate a fleet of ten aircraft in the fire surveillance and Forward Air Control (FAC) roles. DBCA replace each aircraft with a new example as they reach 4000 airframe hours, thus they are also American Champion's largest Scout customer.

=== Wood spar Airworthiness Directive ===
A number of Scouts were involved in accidents—many fatal—that involved wing spar failures. More than a few of these accidents involved aerobatics, maneuvers that the aircraft was neither designed nor approved for. The Scout suffered, in this respect, from a close resemblance to the Citabria line of aircraft, all of which are capable of aerobatics. To some pilots, the similar appearance suggested similar ability. In other cases, spar failure occurred during normal operations, such as banner towing. The failures occurred during high-stress portions of the flights, but under stresses that the design should have withstood. Typically, investigations found that these failures during normal operation had been preceded by undetected overstressing conditions from flight outside the aircraft's limitations (such as aerobatics) or accidents where the wings contacted the ground (including ground loops and nose-overs in which the airplane ended up on its back).

This series of failures led the Federal Aviation Administration to issue an Airworthiness Directive (AD 2000-25-02 R1) that affected all wood-spar wing Scouts. The AD called for immediate and thorough inspections of the wing spars of any Scouts involved in accidents. Further, the AD mandates meticulous yearly inspections for all Scouts with wood-spar wings. Scouts built by American Champion, as well as those retrofitted with the factory metal-spar wings, are exempt from the AD's inspection requirements.

== Specifications (2003 8GCBC Scout - constant speed propeller) ==
Data from Jane's All the World's Aircraft 2003–2004

General characteristics

- Crew: one pilot
- Capacity: one passenger
- Length: 23 ft 0 in (7.01 m)
- Wingspan: 36 ft 2 in (11.02 m)
- Height: 9 ft 8 1/2 in (2.96 m)
- Wing area: 180.0 sq ft (16.72 m^{2})
- Aspect ratio: 7.3:1
- Airfoil: NACA 4412
- Empty weight: 1,400 lb (635 kg)
- Max takeoff weight: 2,150 lb (975 kg)
- Fuel capacity: 36.0 US gal (30.0 imp gal; 136 L) normal, 70 US gal (58 imp gal; 260 L) with optional additional tank
- Powerplant: 1 × Lycoming O-360-C1G , 180 hp (130 kW)
- Propellers: 2-bladed Hartzell HC-C2YR-1BF/F7666A constant-speed propeller, 6 ft 8 in (2.03 m) diameter

Performance

- Maximum speed: 140 mph (230 km/h, 120 kn) at sea level
- Cruise speed: 130 mph (210 km/h, 110 kn) at 75% power
- Stall speed: 49 mph (79 km/h, 43 kn) (flaps down)
- Never exceed speed: 162 mph (261 km/h, 141 kn)
- Range: 415 mi (668 km, 361 nmi) (75% power, normal fuel); 964 mi (838 nmi; 1,551 km) (55% power, optional fuel)
- Service ceiling: 17,000 ft (5,200 m)
- Rate of climb: 1,075 ft/min (5.46 m/s)
- Take-off run to 50 ft (15 m): 1,025 ft (312 m)
- Landing run from 50 ft (15 m): 1,235 ft (376 m)

== See also ==
Related development

- American Champion Citabria
- American Champion Decathlon

Aircraft of comparable role, configuration, and era

- Aviat Husky
- Piper PA-18 Super Cub
