= American Champion Citabria =

Utility aircraft in the US

Citabria
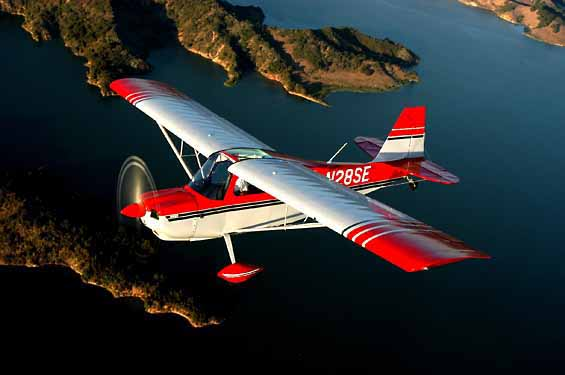

General information
- Type: Light utility aircraft and sports plane
- Manufacturer: American Champion Aircraft; Bellanca; Champion Aircraft
- Designer: Champion Aircraft
- Status: In production
- Number built: over 5,238

History
- Manufactured: 1964-present
- Introduction date: 1964
- First flight: 1964

The Citabria is a light single-engine, two-seat, fixed conventional gear airplane designed by Champion Aircraft which entered production in the United States in 1964. Designed for flight training, utility and personal use, it is capable of sustaining aerobatic stresses from +5g to -2g. This is reflected by its name, which spells "airbatic" backwards.

== Production history ==
The Citabria was designed and initially produced by Champion Aircraft Corporation, and was a derivative of designs the company had been building since acquiring the 7-series Champ from Aeronca in 1954. The model 7ECA Citabria entered production at Champion in 1964. The 7GCAA and 7GCBC variants, added in 1965, were joined by the 7KCAB in 1968.

In 1970, Champion was acquired by Bellanca Aircraft Corporation, which continued production of all of the Champion-designed variants. Bellanca introduced two designs with close connections to the Citabria: The 8KCAB Decathlon and the 8GCBC Scout. Production at Bellanca ended in 1980 and the company's assets were liquidated in 1982.

The Citabria designs passed through the hands of a number of companies through the 1980s, including a Champion Aircraft Company which was no relation to the Champion Aircraft of the 1960s. In that period, only one Citabria model was built—a 7GCBC marketed as "Citabria 150S." American Champion Aircraft Corporation acquired the Citabria, Decathlon, and Scout designs in 1989 and returned the 7ECA, 7GCAA, and 7GCBC models to production over a period of years.

== Design ==
The Citabria traces its lineage back to the Champ. The most noticeable external changes to the design are the Citabria's squared-off rudder surface, wingtips, and rear windows. Like the Champ, the Citabria features tandem seating. The fuselage and tail surfaces are constructed of welded metal tubing. The outer shape of the fuselage is created by a combination of wooden formers and longerons, covered with fabric. The cross-section of the metal fuselage truss is triangular, a design feature which can be traced all the way back to the earliest Aeronca C-2 design of the late 1920s.

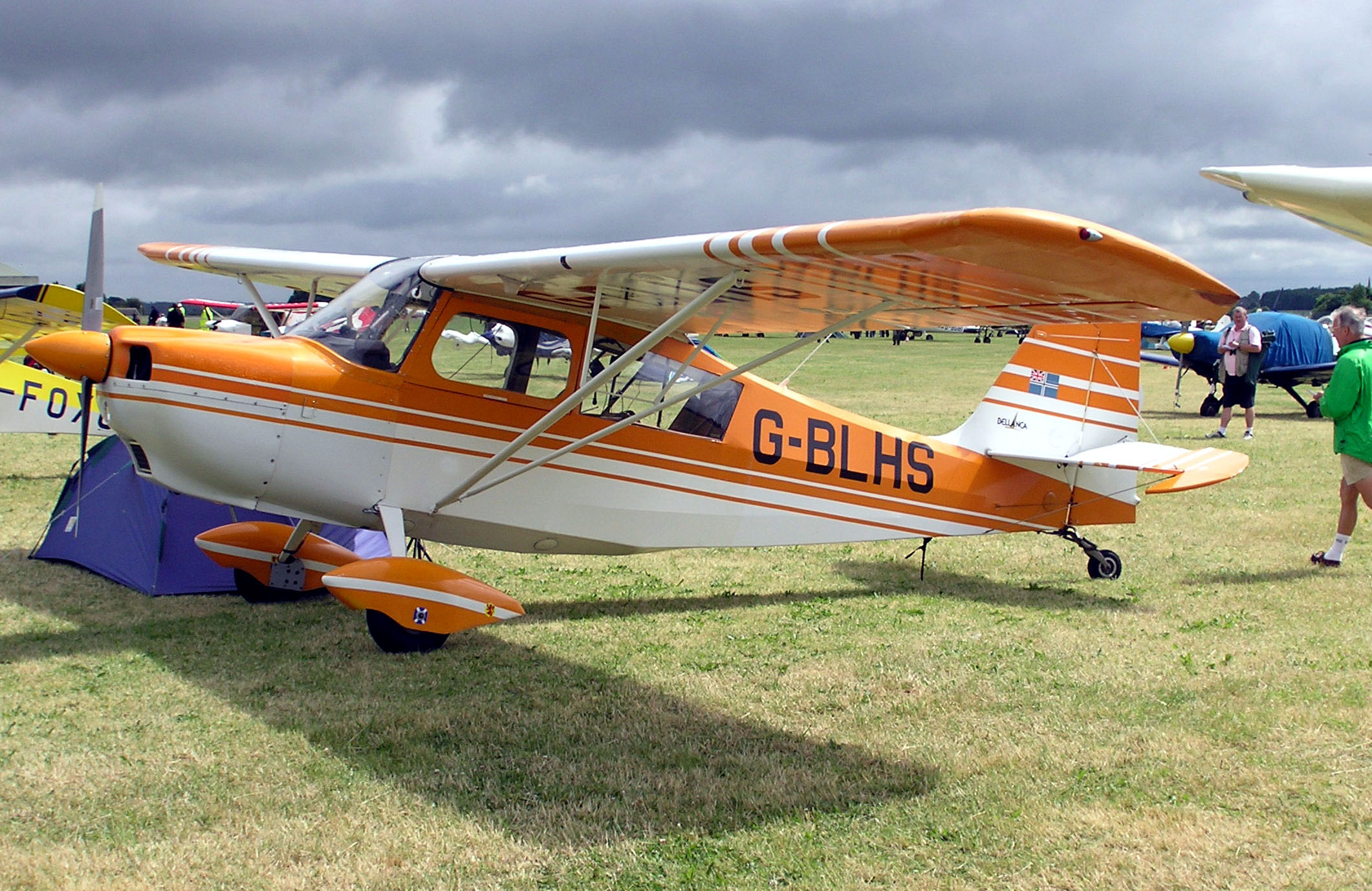
1980-built Bellanca 7ECA Citabria

The strut-braced wings of the Citabria are, like the fuselage and tail surfaces, fabric covered, utilizing aluminum ribs. Most Citabrias were built with wooden spars. American Champion has been using aluminum spars in the aircraft it has produced and has, as well, made the aluminum-spar wings available for retrofit installation on older aircraft.

The landing gear of the Citabria is in a conventional arrangement. The main gear legs of most Citabrias are made of spring steel, though American Champion began to use aluminum gear legs in 2004. Early Citabrias were fitted with a steel tube main gear which uses an oleo strut for shock absorption. All of the variants are discussed in more detail below.

== Operational history ==
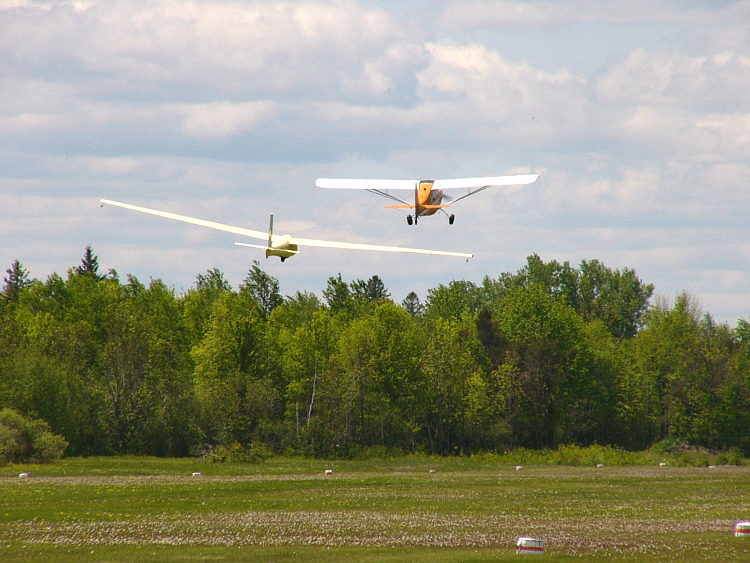
A Champion 7GCAA Citabria towing a Schweizer SGS 1-34 sailplane

When the Citabria was introduced, it was the only airplane being commercially produced in the United States which was certified for aerobatics. Citabrias were also popular as trainers—because of their conventional gear and their aerobatic capabilities—and as personal aircraft. They were also found in utility roles as bush planes—thanks to their short take off and landing (STOL) ability, agriculture, pipeline patrol, and as glider towplanes. Though variants of the design, and other better-suited designs have largely taken over the Citabria's utility roles, Citabrias remain popular as trainers, glider towplanes, and for personal use.

== Variants ==
=== 7ECA, Citabria Standard, Citabria Aurora ===
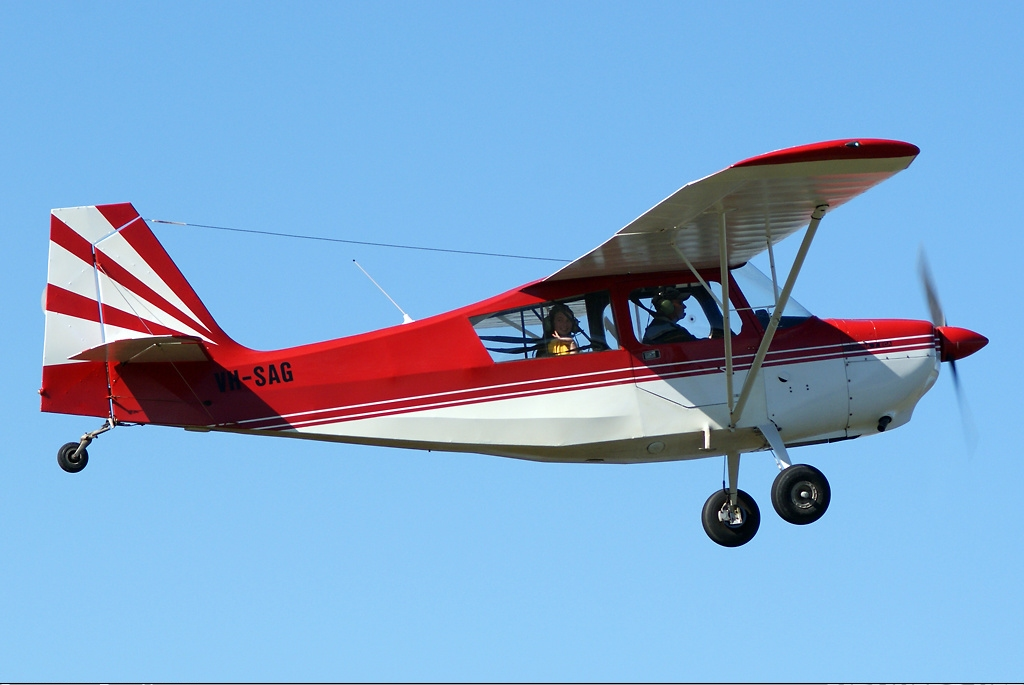
7ECA at Kyneton, Victoria

Introduced in 1964, the 7ECA was the first version of the design and utilized the Continental O-200-A engine of 100 horsepower (75 kW). When introduced, it featured wood-spar wings and oleo-shock main gear. Within the first year of production, Champion began offering the Lycoming O-235-C1 engine of 115 horsepower (86 kW) as an alternative to the Continental. In 1967, Champion switched to spring steel main gear legs; by then, the Lycoming engine had become the standard. On acquiring the design, Bellanca gave this model the name Citabria "Standard" and began using the 115 horsepower (86 kW) Lycoming O-235-K2C engine. When American Champion reintroduced the 7ECA in 1995 as the Citabria "Aurora, " the biggest change was the use of metal-spar wings; the most recent significant design change has been the switch to aluminum main gear legs in 2004.

=== 7GCAA, Citabria 150, Citabria "A" Package, Citabria Adventure ===
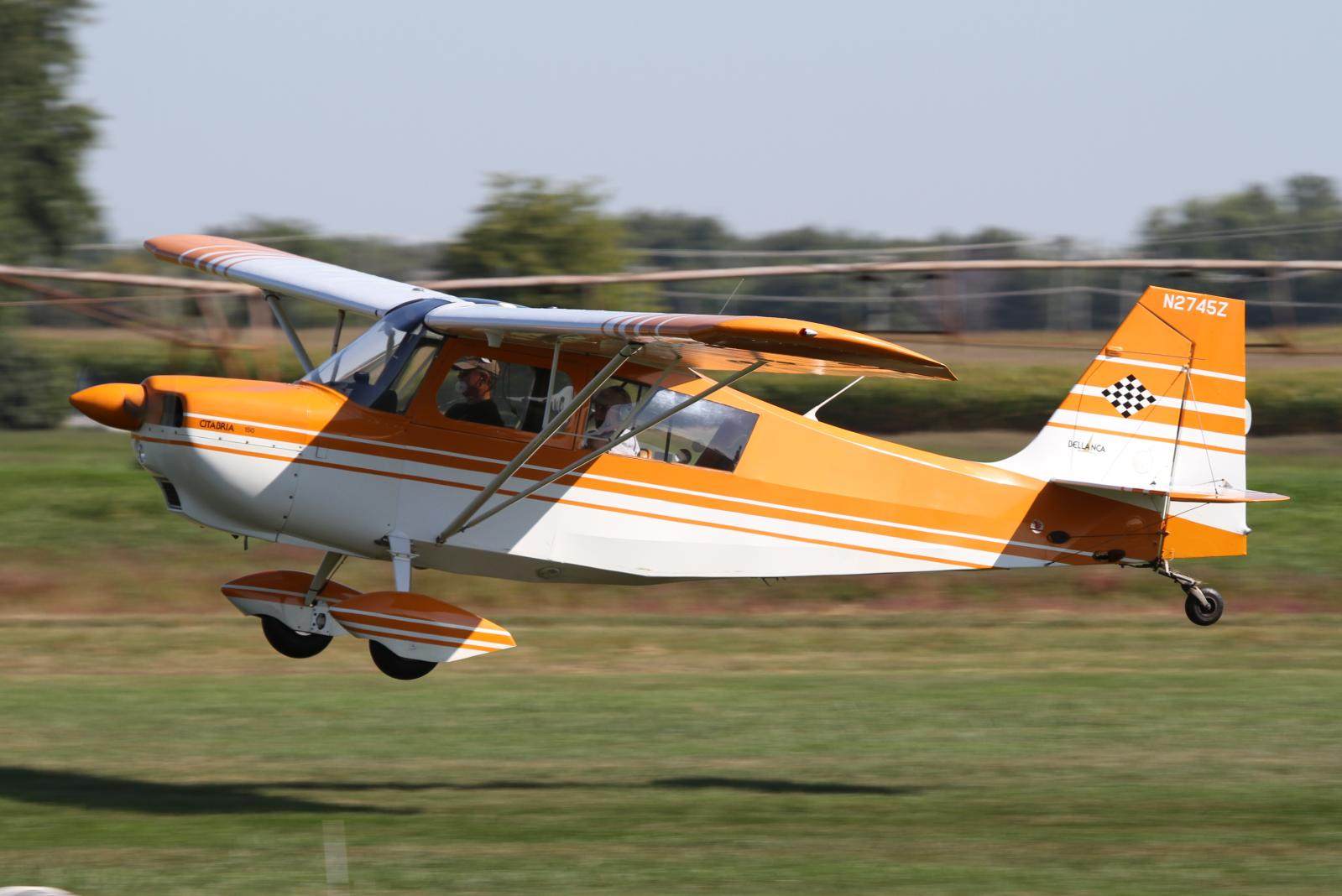
Bellanca 7GCAA

Introduced in 1965, the Champion 7GCAA, like the 7ECA, featured wood-spar wings and oleo-shock main gear. The major difference was in the engine, which in the 7GCAA was a Lycoming O-320-A2B of 150 horsepower (110 kW). Champion switched to spring steel main gear legs in 1967. Bellanca continued production of the 7GCAA as the Citabria "A" Package (a designation apparently begun by Champion), but with no significant design changes. American Champion's 7GCAA, reintroduced in 1997 as the Citabria "Adventure," is similar to earlier versions, with the exception of the metal-spar wings and the use of the Lycoming O-320-B2B engine of 160 horsepower (120 kW); the most recent significant design change has been the switch to aluminum main gear legs in 2004. An "Ultimate Adventure" version, with a Superior Vantage O-360-A3A2 engine of 180 horsepower (130 kW) and a composite propeller, is also produced by American Champion.

=== 7GCBC, Citabria 150s, Citabria "C" Package, Citabria Explorer ===
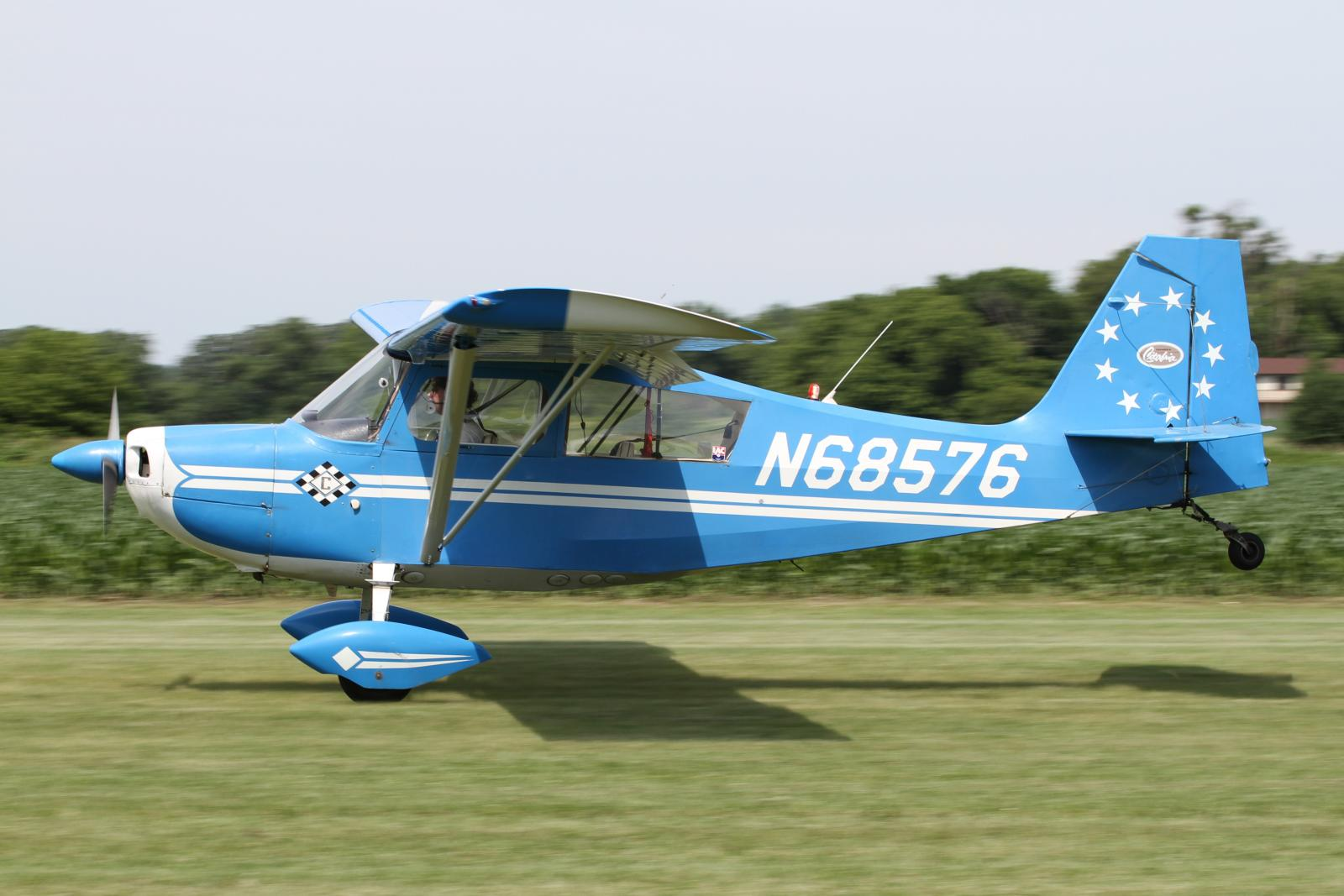
Bellanca 7GCBC

Champion introduced the 7GCBC in 1965. It was substantially similar to the 7GCAA of the same year, with a Lycoming O-320-A2B engine of 150 horsepower (110 kW), wood-spar wings, and spring steel main gear legs. The major differences between these two models are that the 7GCBC has a wingspan of 34.5 feet (10.5 m), 1-foot (0.30 m) longer than the 7ECA and 7GCAA, and carries wing flaps. Bellanca continued production of the 7GCBC, calling it the Citabria "C" Package (a designation apparently begun by Champion). American Champion's 7GCBC, reintroduced in 1994 as the Citabria "Explorer," is similar to earlier versions, with the exception of the metal-spar wings and the use of the Lycoming O-320-B2B of 160 horsepower (120 kW); the most recent significant design change has been the switch to aluminum main gear legs in 2004. A "High Country Explorer" version, with a Superior Vantage O-360-A3A2 engine of 180 horsepower (130 kW) and larger wheels, is also produced by American Champion.

=== 7KCAB, Citabria "B" Package ===
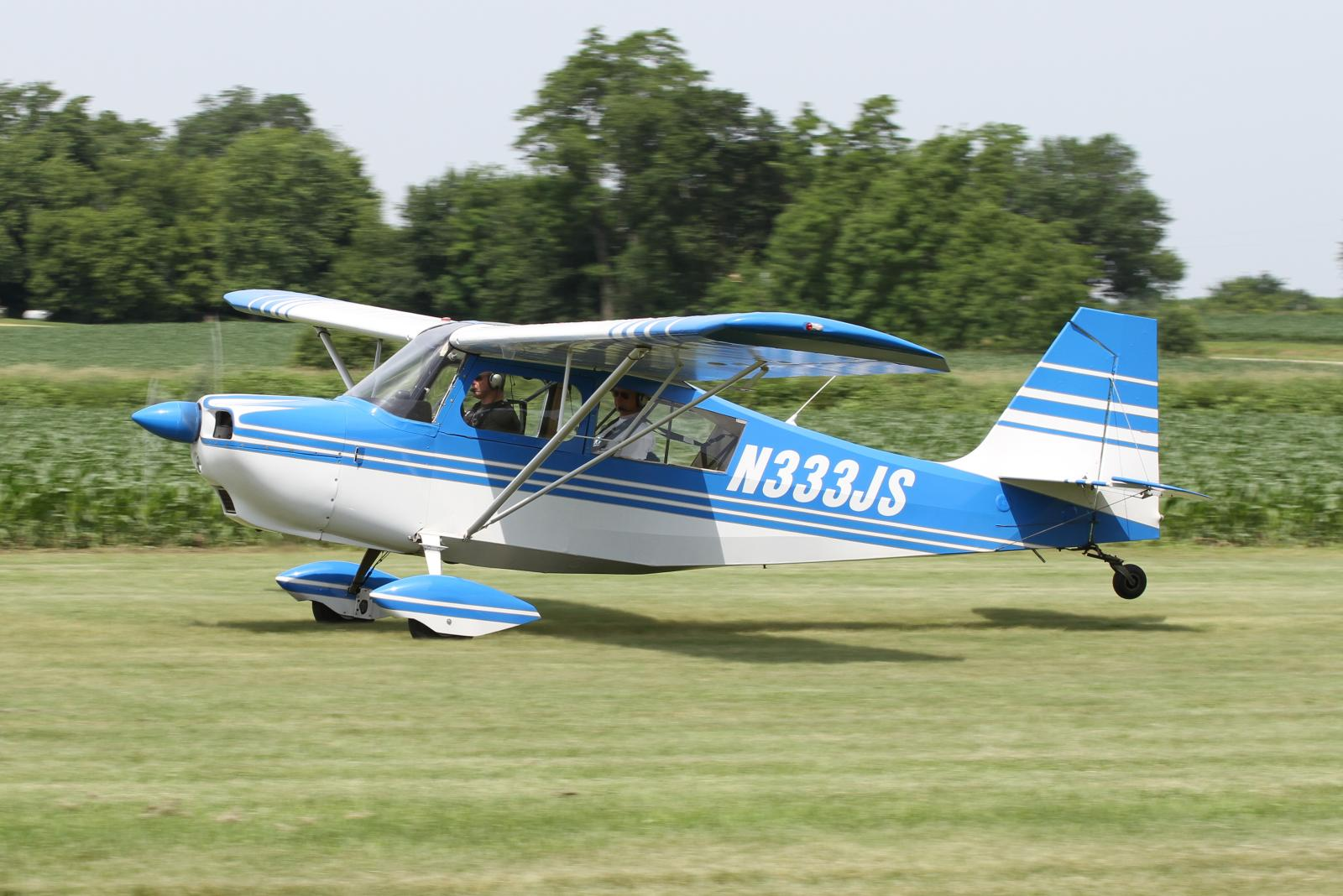
Bellanca 7KCAB

Champion introduced the 7KCAB in 1968. It was substantially similar to the 7GCAA of the same year, with wood-spar wings and spring steel main gear legs. The major differences between the 7GCAA and 7KCAB were in the fuel system and the engine oil system. The engine was replaced with a Lycoming IO-320-E2A of 150 horsepower (110 kW), while a header tank of 1.5 gallons—located beneath the instrument panel—was added to the fuel system. In addition, the carburetor was replaced with a fuel injection system, and a Christen Industries inverted oil system was fitted to the engine. All of these changes were made in order to allow for extended inverted flight, a mode not possible in the earlier models. Bellanca continued production of the 7KCAB as the Citabria "B" Package (a designation apparently begun by Champion).

=== Citabria Pro ===
The 8KCAB Citabria Pro was first flown by Champion on 2 August 1968, and was a dedicated aerobatic aircraft based on the standard Citabria. It was a parasol winged monoplane, with a revised wing section and a longer fuselage. The prototype had an open cockpit for a single pilot, but the design allowed for conversion to a two seat layout. The aircraft was powered by a 200 hp (150 kW) Lycoming IO-360 Special engine driving a two-bladed propeller. It was never put into production at Champion nor by Bellanca which acquired the company and designs only a short time later.

== Military operators ==
The 7GCBC Citabria was used as an observation aircraft by the Turkish Army. One of these aircraft is displayed at the Rahmi M Koç Museum in Istanbul.

Turkey

- Turkish Army

Tonga

- Tongan Air Wing

== Specifications (7GCAA Citabria) ==
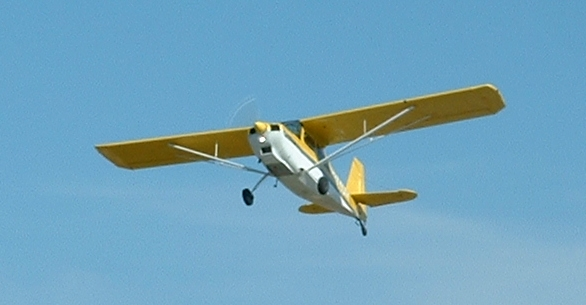
Citabria in flight

Data from Jane's All the World's Aircraft 1969–70

General characteristics

- Crew: one
- Capacity: one passenger
- Length: 22 ft 8 in (6.91 m)
- Wingspan: 33 ft 5 in (10.19 m)
- Height: 6 ft 7 3/4 in (2.03 m)
- Wing area: 165 sq ft (15.3 m^{2})
- Aspect ratio: 6.72:1
- Airfoil: NACA 4412
- Empty weight: 1,037 lb (470 kg)
- Gross weight: 1,650 lb (748 kg)
- Fuel capacity: 39 US gal (32 imp gal; 150 L)
- Powerplant: 1 × Lycoming O-320-A2B four cylinder, horizontally opposed aircraft engine, 150 hp (110 kW)
- Propellers: 2-bladed McCauley 1C172AGM fixed-pitch metal propeller

Performance

- Maximum speed: 130 mph (210 km/h, 110 kn) at sea level
- Cruise speed: 125 mph (201 km/h, 109 kn) at 8,000 ft (2,400 m)
- Stall speed: 50 mph (80 km/h, 43 kn) (without flaps)
- Never exceed speed: 162 mph (261 km/h, 141 kn)
- Range: 537 mi (864 km, 467 nmi) (at max cruise speed)
- Service ceiling: 17,000 ft (5,200 m)
- Rate of climb: 1,120 ft/min (5.7 m/s)
- Take-off run to 50 ft (15 m): 630 ft (192 m)
- Landing run from 50 ft (15 m): 755 ft (230 m)

== See also ==
Related development

- 8KCAB Decathlon and Super Decathlon
- 8GCBC Scout

Aircraft of comparable role, configuration, and era

- Clipped-wing Piper Cub
- Swick Clipped-wing Taylorcraft
- Aviat Husky
