= American Champion Decathlon =

Two-seat fixed conventional gear aerobatic light airplane

8KCAB Decathlon
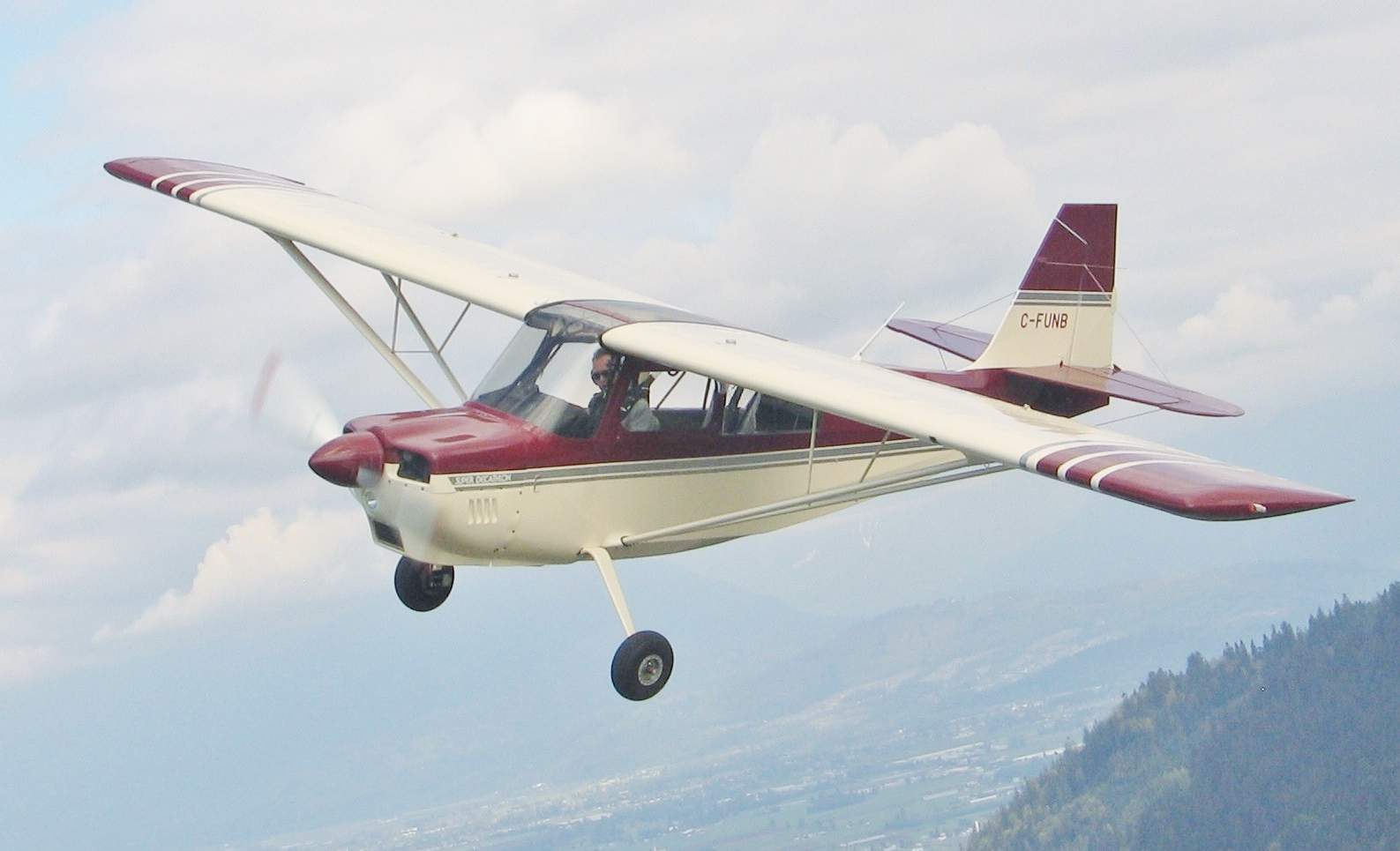

General information
- Type: Sports plane and aerobatic trainer
- Manufacturer: American Champion Aircraft
- Designer: Champion Aircraft Corporation
- Number built: Over 6,000

History
- Introduction date: 1972

The American Champion 8KCAB Decathlon and Super Decathlon are two-seat fixed conventional gear light airplanes designed for flight training and personal use and capable of sustaining aerobatic stresses between +6g and −5g. The Decathlon entered production in the United States in 1970 as a more powerful and stronger complement to the American Champion Citabria line of aircraft.

The Decathlon was designed by the Champion Aircraft Corporation, and is a derivative of the 7-series Citabrias. While the Citabria designs remain successful, and the introduction of the 7KCAB variant of the Citabria had added limited inverted flight capability, the Citabrias are not capable of "outside" maneuvers, those requiring significant negative-g loads. Pilots wanted an aircraft capable of more maneuvers, and Champion introduced the 8KCAB Decathlon in response to this demand.

== Development ==
The Decathlon entered production at Champion in 1972, immediately before the company was acquired by Bellanca Aircraft Corporation, so only a handful were produced by Champion. Bellanca continued production of the Decathlon throughout the 1970s, moving to the Super Decathlon variant during 1976. Bellanca built over 600 of the 8KCAB design before production of the aircraft was interrupted when the company's assets were liquidated in 1981.

The Decathlon design passed through the hands of a number of companies through the 1980s, including a Champion Aircraft Company which was no relation to the Champion Aircraft of the 1960s, but no Decathlons were built in that period. American Champion Aircraft Corporation acquired the Decathlon design, along with the 8GCBC Scout and the group of Citabria and Champ variants, in 1990, bringing the Super Decathlon version back into production that same year. It is still being produced.

== Design ==
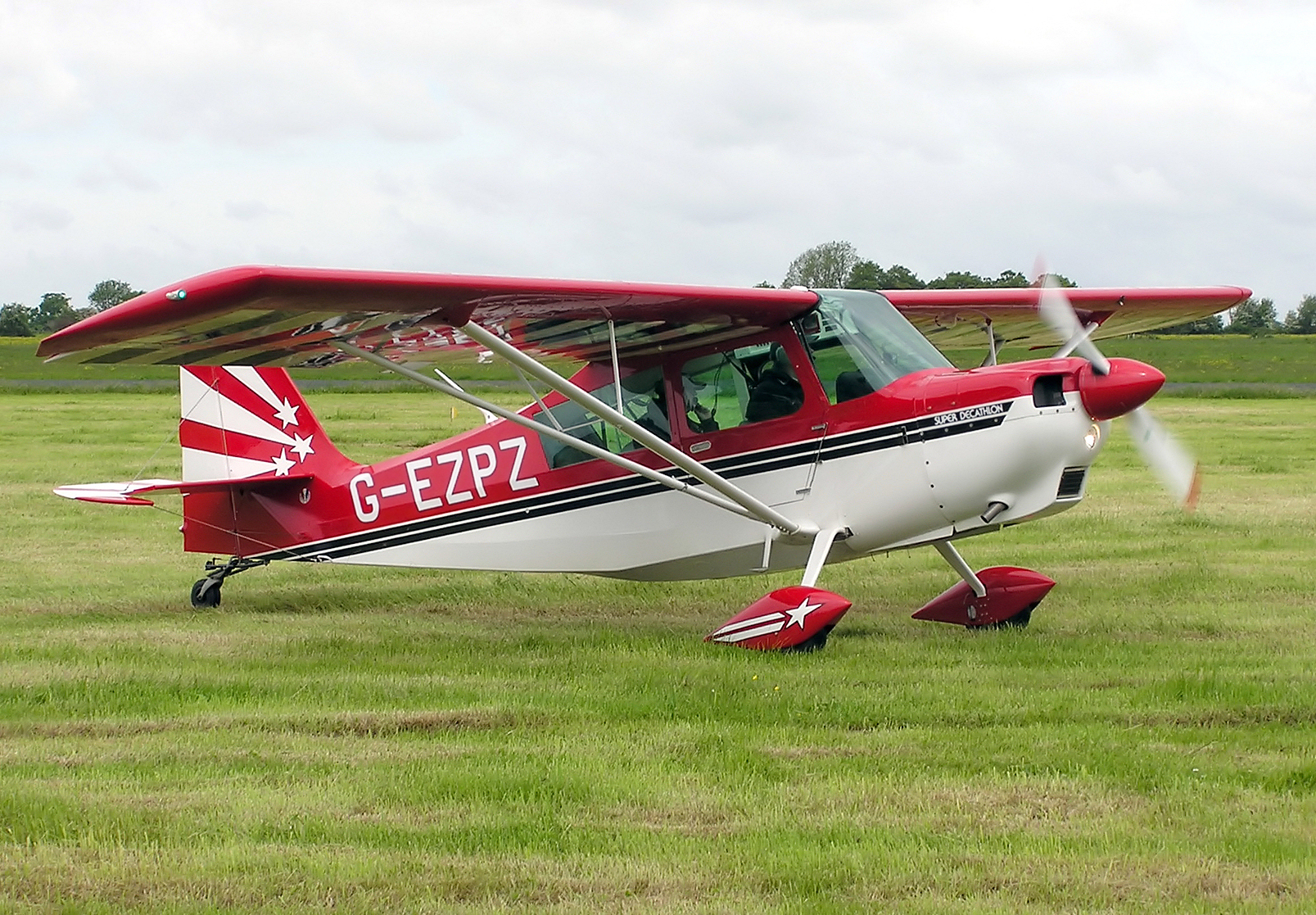
8KCAB Super Decathlon, built 2005

The Decathlon traces its lineage back to the Aeronca Champ, by way of the Citabria. Like the Citabria, the Decathlon features tandem seating and center-stick controls. The fuselage and tail surfaces are constructed of welded metal tubing. The outer shape of the fuselage is created by a combination of wooden formers and longerons, covered with fabric. The cross-section of the metal fuselage truss is triangular, a design feature which can be traced back to the earliest Aeronca C-2 design of the late 1920s.

The strut-braced wings of the Decathlon are, like the fuselage and tail surfaces, fabric covered, using aluminum alloy ribs. The wings of Champion and Bellanca Decathlons were built with wooden spars. American Champion has been using aluminum spars in the aircraft it has produced and has made the aluminum-spar wings available for retrofit installation on older aircraft. Compared to the Citabria's wingspan of 33.5 feet (10.2 m), the Decathlon's wingspan is shorter, at 32 feet (9.8 m). One of the major developments of the 8KCAB Decathlon over the 7KCAB Citabria is the Decathlon's wing, which employs a semi-symmetrical NACA 1412 airfoil, as opposed to the Citabria's flat-bottomed airfoil. This change gives the Decathlon better inverted flight and negative-g maneuver capabilities.

The landing gear of the Decathlon is in a conventional arrangement. The main gear legs of most Decathlons are made of spring steel, though American Champion began to use aluminum gear legs in 2004.

Like the 7KCAB, the engine of the 8KCAB has a fuel injection system, as opposed to a carburetor. To facilitate negative-g flight, the fuel system incorporates a 1.5 gallon header tank beneath the instrument panel, and the engine is fitted with a Christen Industries inverted oil system.

Champion and Bellanca built the Decathlon with several Lycoming IO-320 engine variants, all of 150 horsepower (110 kW), and with the choice of a fixed-pitch or constant speed propeller. The major improvement in Bellanca's introduction of the Super Decathlon was the change of engine to the Lycoming AEIO-360-H1A or –H1B, both of 180 horsepower (130 kW), which was accompanied by a selection of constant speed propellers. The American Champion Super Decathlon uses the AEIO-360-H1B, along with a constant speed propeller.

== Operational history ==
Though the Decathlon went out of production within a decade of its introduction, this was not due to any fault in the design, but rather to the slump in general aviation in the United States at the end of the 1970s and the beginning of the 1980s. Since its reintroduction, the Super Decathlon has sold steadily. Decathlons and Super Decathlons remain popular as aerobatic trainers, as beginning and intermediate aerobatic aircraft, and as personal aircraft.

=== Famous people ===
Steve Fossett was flying a Bellanca-built Super Decathlon when he went missing on September 3, 2007. He took off from an airstrip at William Barron Hilton's Flying-M Ranch, about 70 miles (110 km) southeast of Reno, Nevada. Remains of the plane were found 13 months later near the town of Mammoth Lakes, California, just south of the original search area.

James May, a presenter on The Grand Tour owned an 8KCAB Decathlon with the registration G-OCOK, in reference to his catch-phrase on the television series Top Gear.

== Variants ==
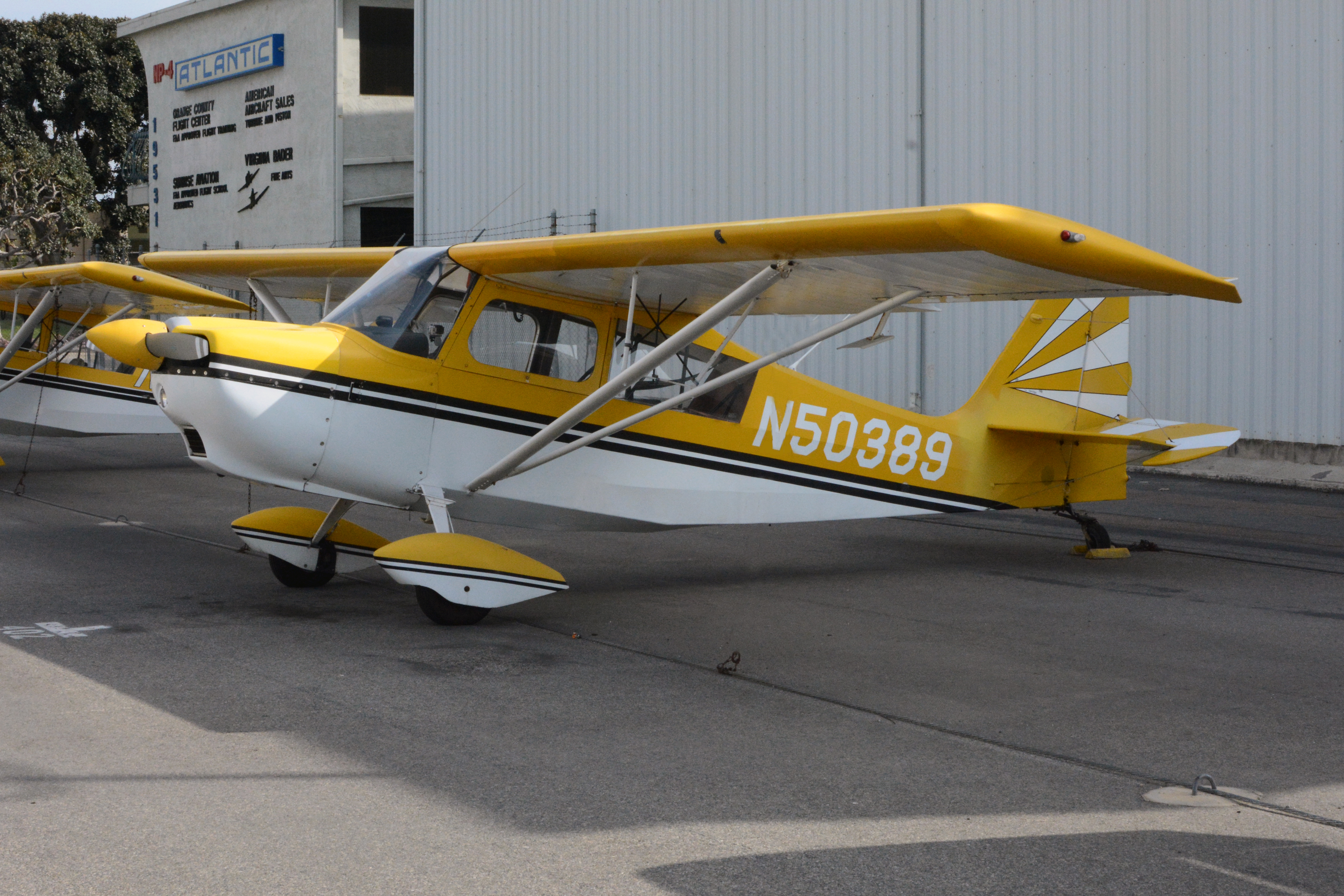
Bellanca 8KCAB Decathlon

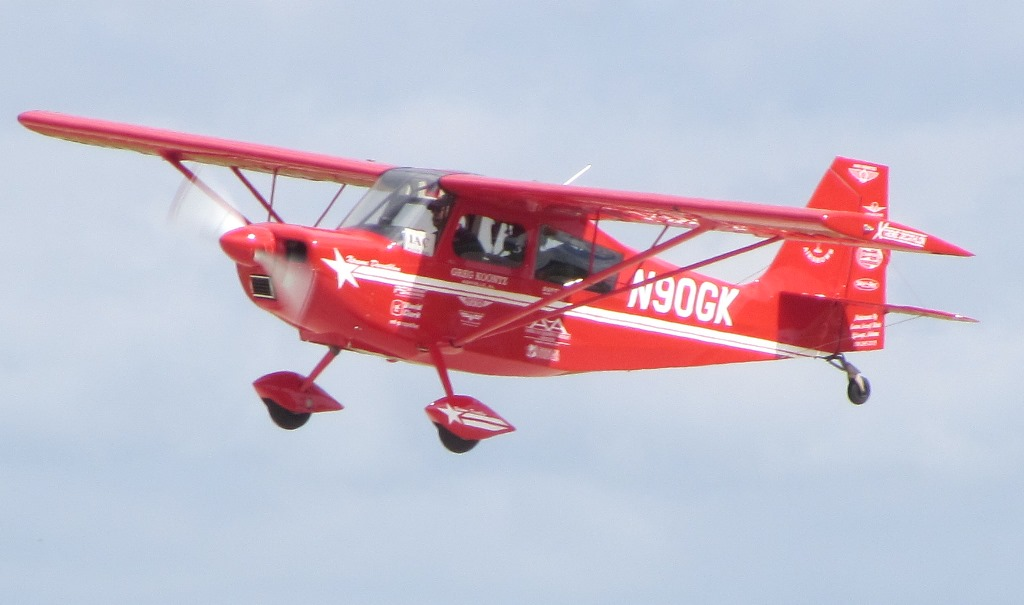
American Champion Xtreme

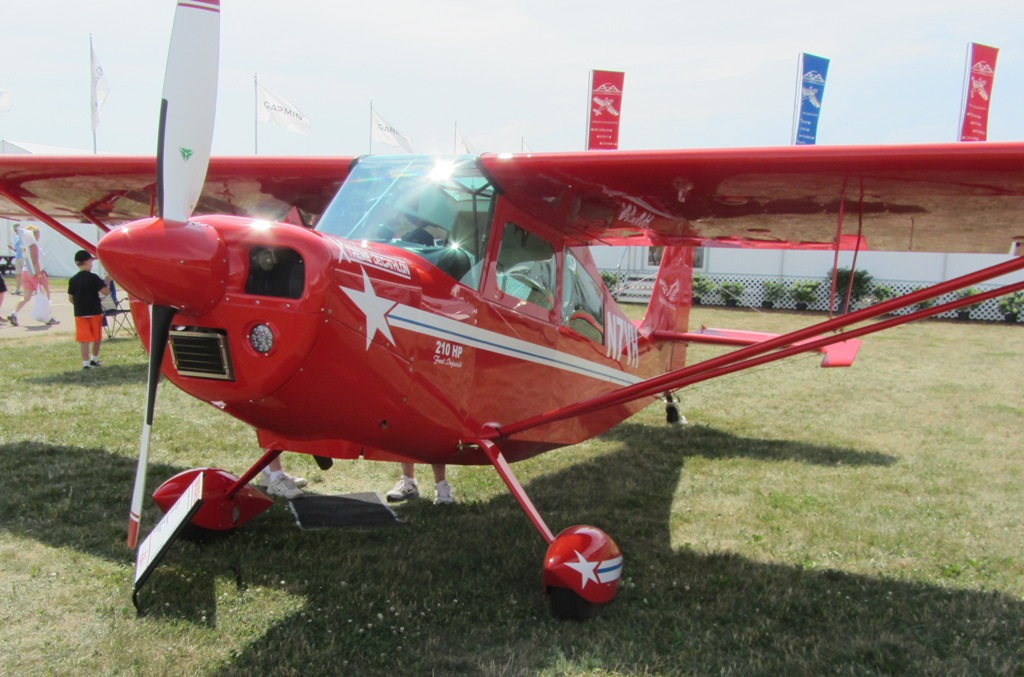
American Champion Xtreme

Champion Model 8KCAB Decathlon
Original designation.
Bellanca Decathlon
Two-seat light cabin aircraft, powered by a 112-kW (150-hp) Lycoming AEIO-320-E1B piston engine.
Bellanca Decathlon CS
Two-seat light cabin aircraft, powered by a 112-kW (150-hp) Lycoming AEIO-320-E1B piston engine, fitted with a constant-speed propeller.
Bellanca Super Decathlon

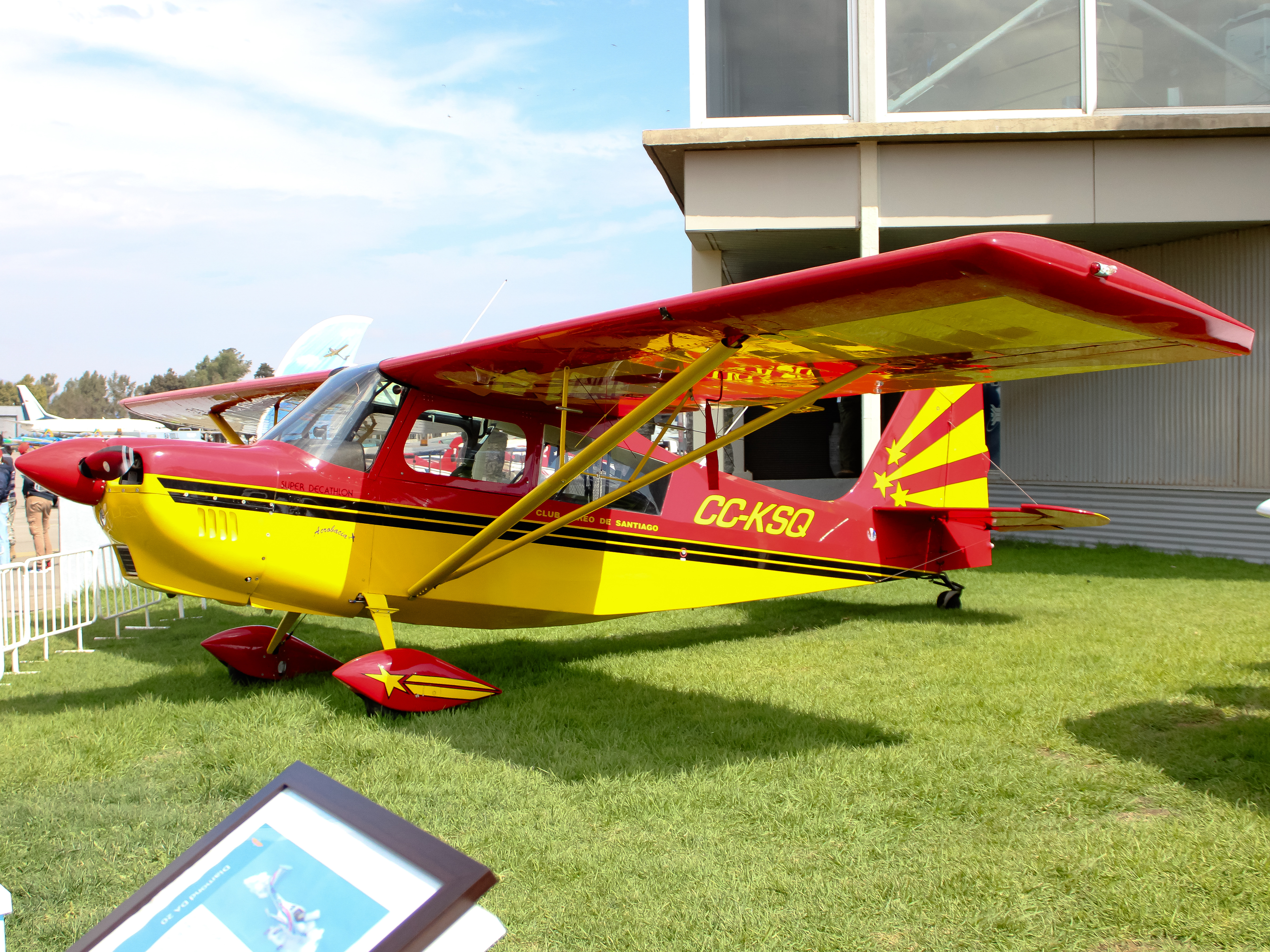
A Super Decathlon at display during FIDAE2024

Two-seat light cabin aircraft, powered by a 134-kW (180-hp) Lycoming AEIO-360-H1A or -H1B piston engine, fitted with a constant speed propeller.
American Champion Xtreme
Model introduced in 2012, powered by a 210 hp (157 kW) Lycoming AEIO-390-A1B6 engine driving an MT-Propeller 76 in (1.9 m) propeller. This model also has redesigned longer main landing gear legs to accommodate the longer propeller, a new airfoil-section tailplane with 10% larger area, clipped wingtips and greater aileron effectiveness.

== Specifications (8KCAB Super Decathlon) ==
Data from Manufacturer

General characteristics

- Crew: one
- Capacity: one passenger
- Length: 22.9 ft (7.0 m)
- Wingspan: 32 ft (9.8 m)
- Height: 7.7 ft (2.3 m)
- Wing area: 169.1 sq ft (15.71 m^{2})
- Empty weight: 1,340 lb (608 kg)
- Gross weight: 1,950 lb (885 kg) (normal category)
- Fuel capacity: 40 U.S. gallons (150 L; 33 imp gal)
- Powerplant: 1 × Lycoming AEIO-360-H1B four cylinder horizontally-opposed aircraft engine, 180 hp (130 kW)
- Propellers: Hartzell Propeller HC-C2YR-4CF/FC7666A-2
- Propellers: 6 ft 2 in (1.88 m) diameter

Performance

- Maximum speed: 155 mph (249 km/h, 135 kn) at sea level
- Cruise speed: 141 mph (227 km/h, 123 kn)
- Stall speed: 53 mph (85 km/h, 46 kn) (clean)
- Never exceed speed: 200 mph (320 km/h, 170 kn)
- Endurance: 3.4 hours at 75% power
- Service ceiling: 15,800 ft (4,800 m)
- g limits: +6/-5
- Rate of climb: 1,280 ft/min (6.5 m/s)
- Wing loading: 10.64 lb/sq ft (51.9 kg/m^{2})
- Power/mass: 10 lb/hp

== See also ==
Related development

- American Champion Citabria
- American Champion Scout
