= Aeronca Champion =

American single-engine light plane

Model 7 Champion
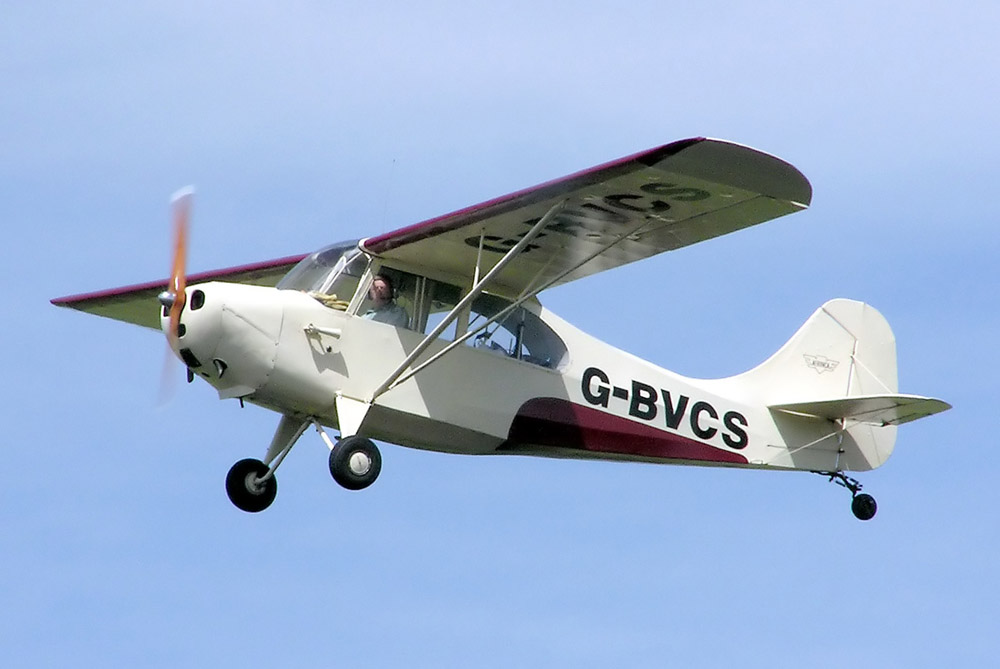
- Aeronca 7AC Champion over Kemble, Gloucestershire, England

General information
- Type: Light utility aircraft / trainer
- Manufacturer: Aeronca; Champion Aircraft; Bellanca; American Champion Aircraft
- Designer: Ray Hermes
- Status: Production completed
- Primary users: private owners flight schools, aircraft rental services, United States Air Force, Air National Guard; U.S. Army; Civil Air Patrol
- Number built: more than 10,000, all manufacturers and variants (over 7,200 Aeronca 7AC Champion, 1945–1948)

History
- Manufactured: 1946–1951; 2007–2018
- Introduction date: November 1945
- First flight: April 29, 1944
- Developed from: Aeronca L-3, Aeronca T, Aeronca Defender, Aeronca 50 Chief
- Variant: Aeronca L-16
- Developed into: Citabria, Champion Lancer

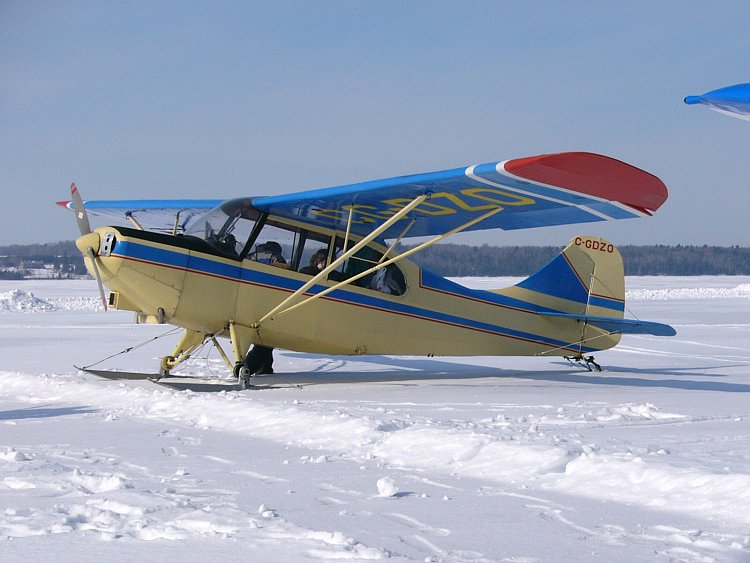
Aeronca 7AC Champion on skis

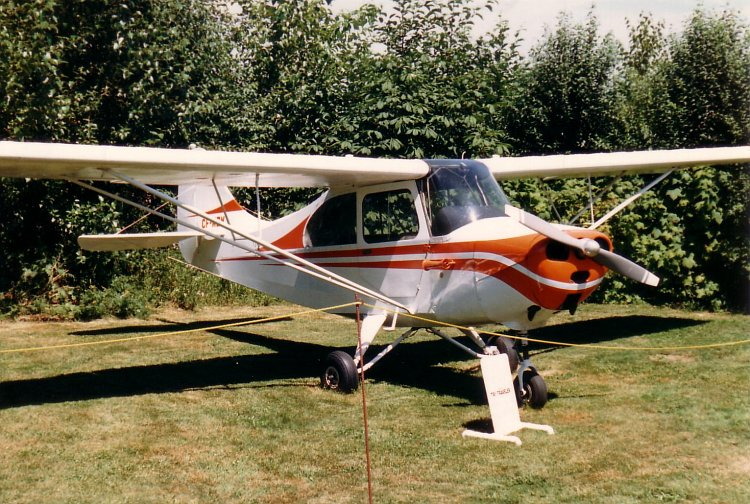
Champion 7FC Tri-Traveller at the Canadian Museum of Flight

The Aeronca Model 7 Champion, commonly known as the "Champ", or "Airknocker", is a single-engine light airplane with a high wing, generally configured with fixed conventional landing gear and tandem seating for two occupants.

The Champ was designed for flight training and personal use, and was specifically developed to compete with the popular Piper Cub. It entered production in the United States in 1945, spawning one of the most popular, and longest-produced, light airplane models in the world.

In addition to the Champ's large-volume production by Aeronca Aircraft, it was revived in variations by the Champion Aircraft Company in the 1950s and 1960s, and then again in further variants by Bellanca in the 1960s and 1970s, and by American Champion Aircraft in the early 2000s.

To take advantage of the new light-sport aircraft (LSA) category, the Champion was returned to production in 2007, but was discontinued by mid-2019.

== Design and development ==
The Aeronca 7 Champion line—developed in the mid-1940s as a post-World War II response to the popular Piper J-3 Cub—uses similar design features (already featured in Aeronca's wartime designs, the Aeronca Model T, Aeronca Defender, and Aeronca L-3), but also incorporates aspects of traditional Aeronca designs, including the internal main trusswork of the fuselage frame. Like its predecessors and initial rivals, the high-wing, two-seat plane has tandem seating, conventional landing gear (tailwheel-equipped), and a small piston engine.

As with many light aircraft of the time, the Champ's fuselage and tail surfaces are constructed of welded metal tubing. The outer shape of the fuselage is created by a combination of wooden formers and longerons, covered with fabric. The cross-section of the metal fuselage truss is triangular, a design feature which can be traced all the way back to the earliest Aeronca C-2 design of the late 1920s.

The strut-braced wings of the Champ are, like the fuselage and tail surfaces, fabric-covered, and use aluminum ribs. Most Champs were built with wooden spars. American Champion has been using aluminum spars in the aircraft it has produced, and has also made the aluminum-spar wings available for retrofit installation on older aircraft.

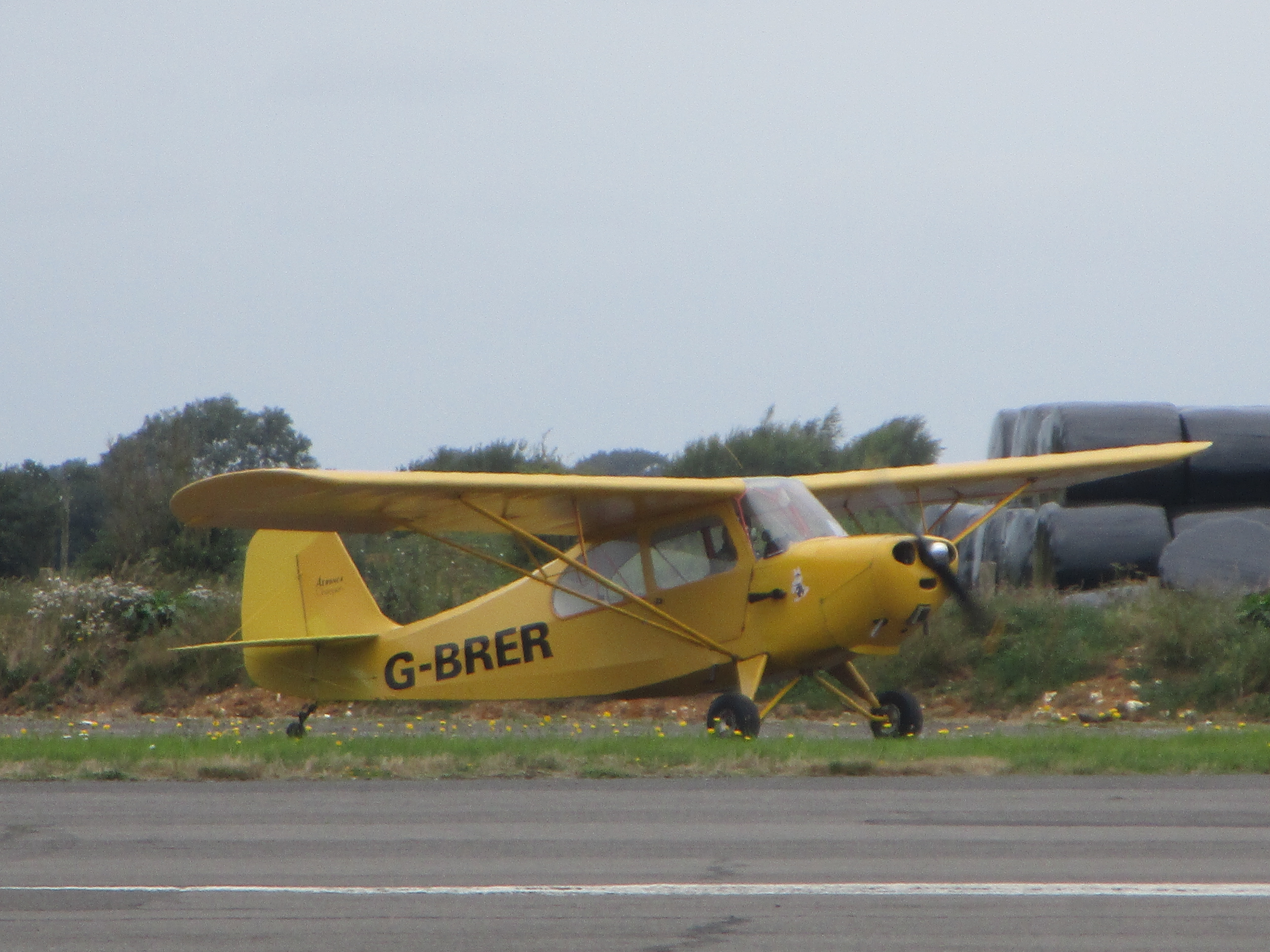
An Aeronca 7AC Champion taxiing at Dunkeswell Aerodrome in Southern England. Note the similarities to its rival, the Piper J3 Cub

Like the Piper Cub with which it competed, the Champ features tandem seating. However, while the J-3 model of the Cub is flown solo from the rear seat, the Champ can be soloed from the front, giving improved forward visibility, particularly on the ground and during takeoffs, landings, and climbs. The Champ offers far better visibility than the Cub, allowing 300 degrees of visibility to a front-seated pilot, and has a wider cabin than the Cub. Additionally, an uncommon Champ variant—the 7HC—was produced with an enlarged rear seat allowing two passengers to be carried.

The landing gear of most Champs is in a conventional arrangement, though two variants with tricycle gear were produced, and a model with reversed tricycle gear was tried. Conventional-gear Champs feature a steerable tailwheel and most have steel tube main gear which use an oleo strut for shock absorption. One variant utilized sprung-steel main gear, and American Champion uses aluminum gear legs in its production model of the Champ. Tricycle-gear Champs use the steel tube and oleo strut main gear, mating these with an oleo strut nose gear.

Models 7AC, 7CCM, 7DC, and 7EC were approved as floatplanes, with the addition of floats and vertical stabilizer fins; the floatplane versions were designated the S7AC, S7CCM, S7DC, and S7EC, respectively. The 7GC and 7HC may also be operated with floats but are not given a special designation in this configuration. All floatplane versions have increased gross weights over the corresponding landplanes.

== Operational history ==
Built by Aeronca Aircraft Corporation, the Champ first flew in 1944, and entered production in 1945. As an economical postwar rival to the Piper Cub (which it largely improved upon), the Champ was popular with training schools who were training veterans returning from World War II, by the thousands, with government funding through the G.I. Bill.

The original model 7AC Champion initially sold by the thousands, peaking in 1946, as Aeronca developed the highest-volume production line in general aviation. Between 1946 and 1947, Aeronca was producing an average 30 light aircraft per day (peaking at 50 per day at one point). But 1946 was a momentary explosion in lightplane production, industry-wide. The postwar boom-and-bust of the late 1940s and early 1950s brought an abrupt end to the massive sales, and—like the rest of the U.S. lightplane industry—Aeronca production dropped to a small fraction of 1946–1947 sales.

Engine upgrades in 1947, 1948 and 1949 resulted in the Models 7BCM, 7DC and the electric-system-equipped 7EC, all distinguished from the 7AC by a larger vertical tail than predecessors, to compensate for the greater torque and p-factor of the larger engines.

Some of these Champ variants were acquired by the U.S. Army Air Forces (USAAF) and its successor, the U.S. Air Force (USAF), particularly for use by the U.S. Army Ground Forces and the National Guard, as replacements for the Piper L-4 variant of the Piper Cub, used as an observation and liaison aircraft. The Aeronca Champ military variants were labeled L-16, L-16A and L-16B.

By the time production ended in 1951, the company had sold more than 8,000 Champions, mostly 7AC Champs (approx. 7,200).

Aeronca ceased all production of light aircraft in 1951, and the Champ design was sold in 1954 to Champion Aircraft, who continued production of some of the more advanced variants of the Champ, from the 1950s into the early 1960s—gradually modifying them into the aerobatic Champion Citabria.

Champion Aircraft was acquired in 1970 by Bellanca Aircraft which continued production of their Champ-derived Citabria and Decathlon designs.

In 1971, Bellanca introduced the 7ACA version of the Champ as a more basic complement to their other designs, as the least expensive, and lowest-performance, commercially produced light plane on the market at the time.

Only a handful of 7ACAs were built between 1971 and 1972. Bellanca ceased all production in the early 1980s.

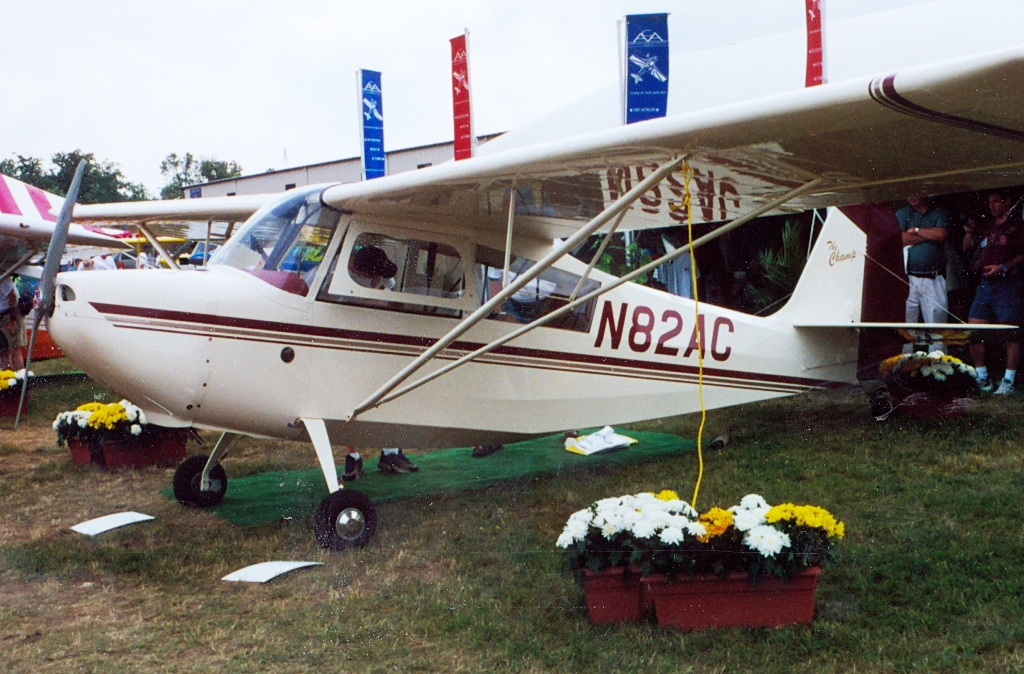
Jabiru powered prototype

American Champion Aircraft Corporation acquired the Champ and related designs in 1989. In 2001, they were rumored to be considering a reintroduction of the Champ design as a 7EC powered by a Jabiru Aircraft engine. While a test version was flown, this combination was not put into production. With the creation of the light-sport aircraft (LSA) category of aircraft in the United States by the FAA, American Champion in late 2007 began producing a revised version of the 7EC powered by the 100 hp (75 kW) Continental O-200-A. The new production aircraft are type certified, but also qualify to be flown by sport pilots in the United States. Although the fuselage and cowling contours are similar to the original-production models, the new aircraft used the windows, interior, door, and windscreen of the modern Citabria. Fuel capacity was reduced to 18 US gal (68 L; 15 imp gal) to conserve weight; despite this measure and various others, such as the use of aluminum landing gear legs and bare birch floorboards rather than carpet, the aircraft's payload is inadequate to carry two adults and full fuel simultaneously. The manufacturer was considering various further weight-reduction measures including the use of the lightened Continental O-200D engine previously offered in the Cessna 162 Skycatcher. However, the revived 7EC was dropped from production by mid-2019.

Standard-production 7AC, 7BCM (L-16A), 7CCM (L-16B), 7DC, and 7ACA models qualify as U.S. Light Sport Aircraft. Only those specific original-production 7EC airplanes certificated at a 1,300 lb (590 kg) gross weight qualify for the LSA category; a standard original-production 7EC is certificated at a gross weight of 1,450 lb (660 kg) and does not qualify.

== Variants ==
Various versions of the Champ have been tested and produced since 1944, including military, aerobatic, cropduster, tricycle-gear and (as the 402 Lancer) a twin-engined variant.

The derivative Citabria designs — models 7ECA, 7GCAA, 7GCBC, and 7KCAB — are discussed in a separate article, as is the twin-engined 402 Lancer. Floatplane variants are designated by an "S" prefix and are discussed together with the standard respective land variant.

=== 7AC Champion ===
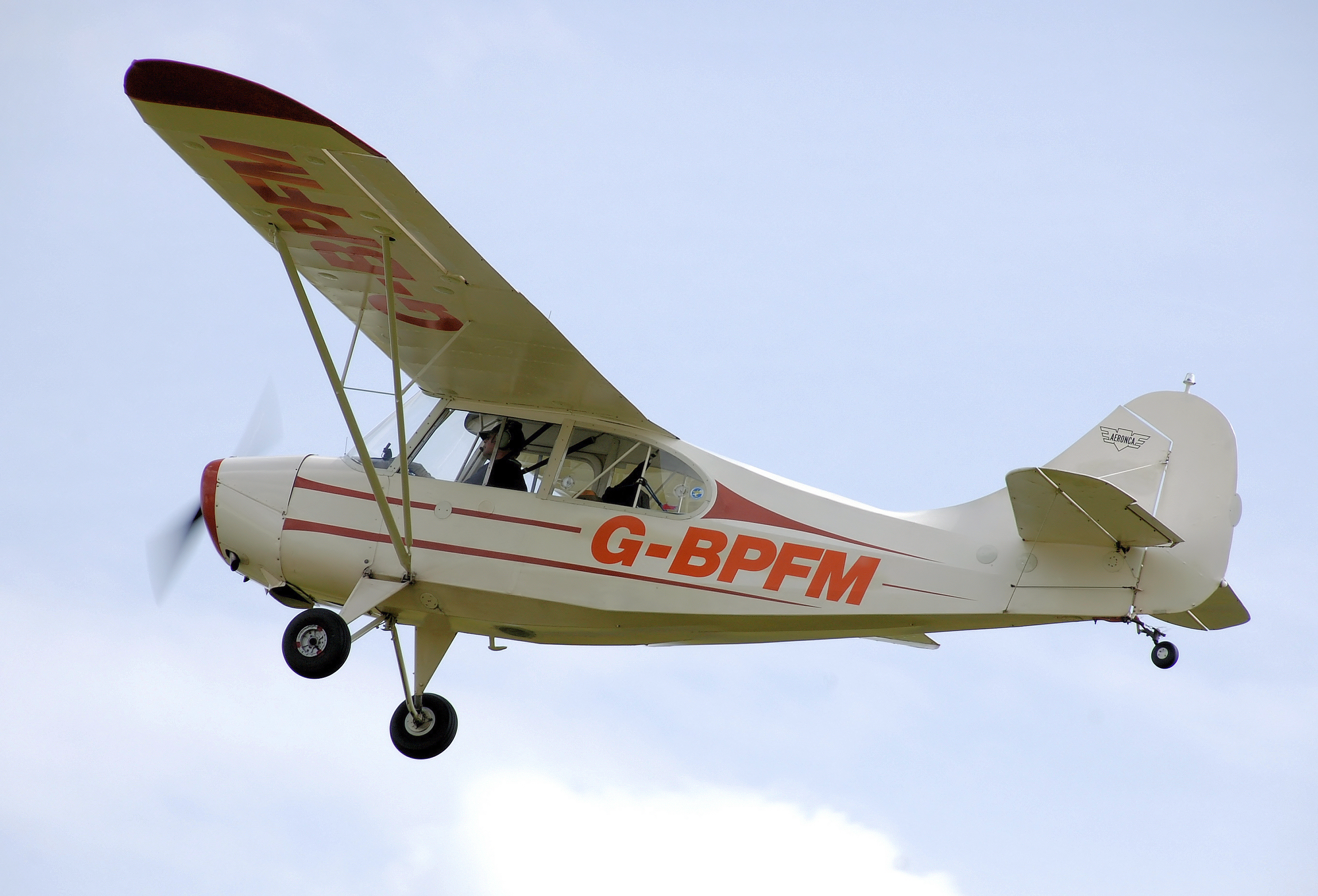
Aeronca 7AC Champion

Introduced in 1945, the 7AC Champion ("Champ") was the first (and, by far, the most popular) version of the design. It used the Continental A-65-8 engine of 65 horsepower (48 kW). (Other 65-hp engines by Lycoming and Franklin were also fitted.) A supplemental type certificate allows the installation of a Lycoming O-235. The Champ featured a conventional landing gear configuration, with shock absorption in the main gear provided by oleo struts. The aircraft had no electrical system. It is distinguishable from nearly all other variants by the absence of a dorsal fin at the leading edge of the vertical tail (most later models had the enlarged tail). Approximately 7,200 were built between 1945 and 1948—far outnumbering all other subsequent variants combined, and far outnumbering most rival designs of the period. Some were acquired by the U.S. military and designated L-16—not to be confused with the L-16A and L-16B derived from later Champ variants. Gross weight is 1,220 lb (550 kg) for the standard 7AC and 1,320 lb (600 kg) when configured as an S7AC floatplane; fuel capacity for either version is 13 US gal (49 L; 11 imp gal) in a single tank.

=== 7ACA ===
1971 reintroduction by Bellanca, a modernized version of the design which made it a variant of the Citabria line. The 7ACA is powered by the two-cylinder Franklin 2A engine of 60 horsepower (45 kW); Gross weight is 1,220 lb (550 kg). 71 were produced.

=== 7BCM, L-16A ===
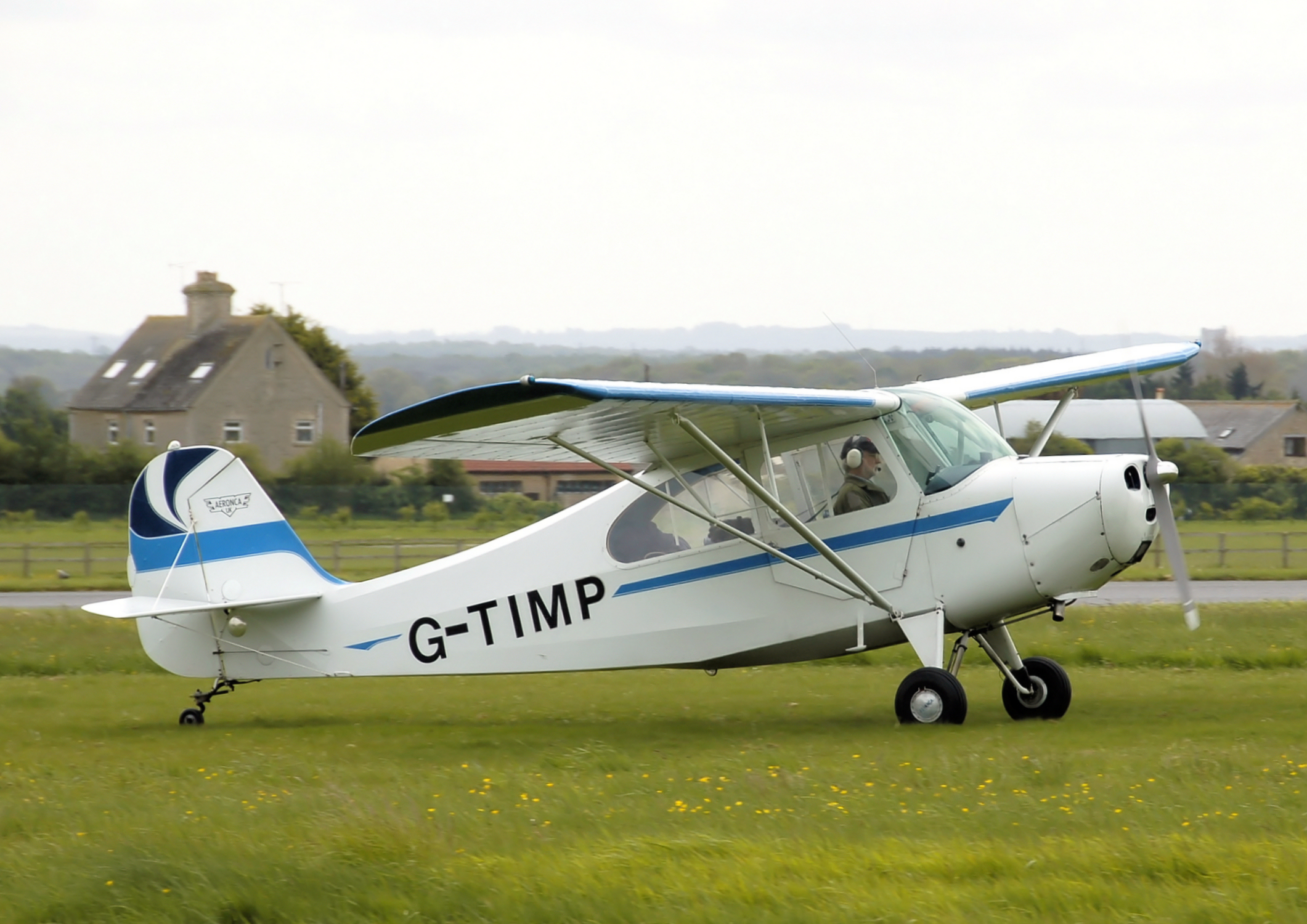
7BCM Champion

Upgraded version introduced in 1947 with an 85 horsepower (63 kW) Continental C85 and "no-bounce" version of the main landing gear. All of the 7BCM production went to the military as model L-16A. Gross weight and fuel capacity are unchanged from the 7AC. 509 were built.

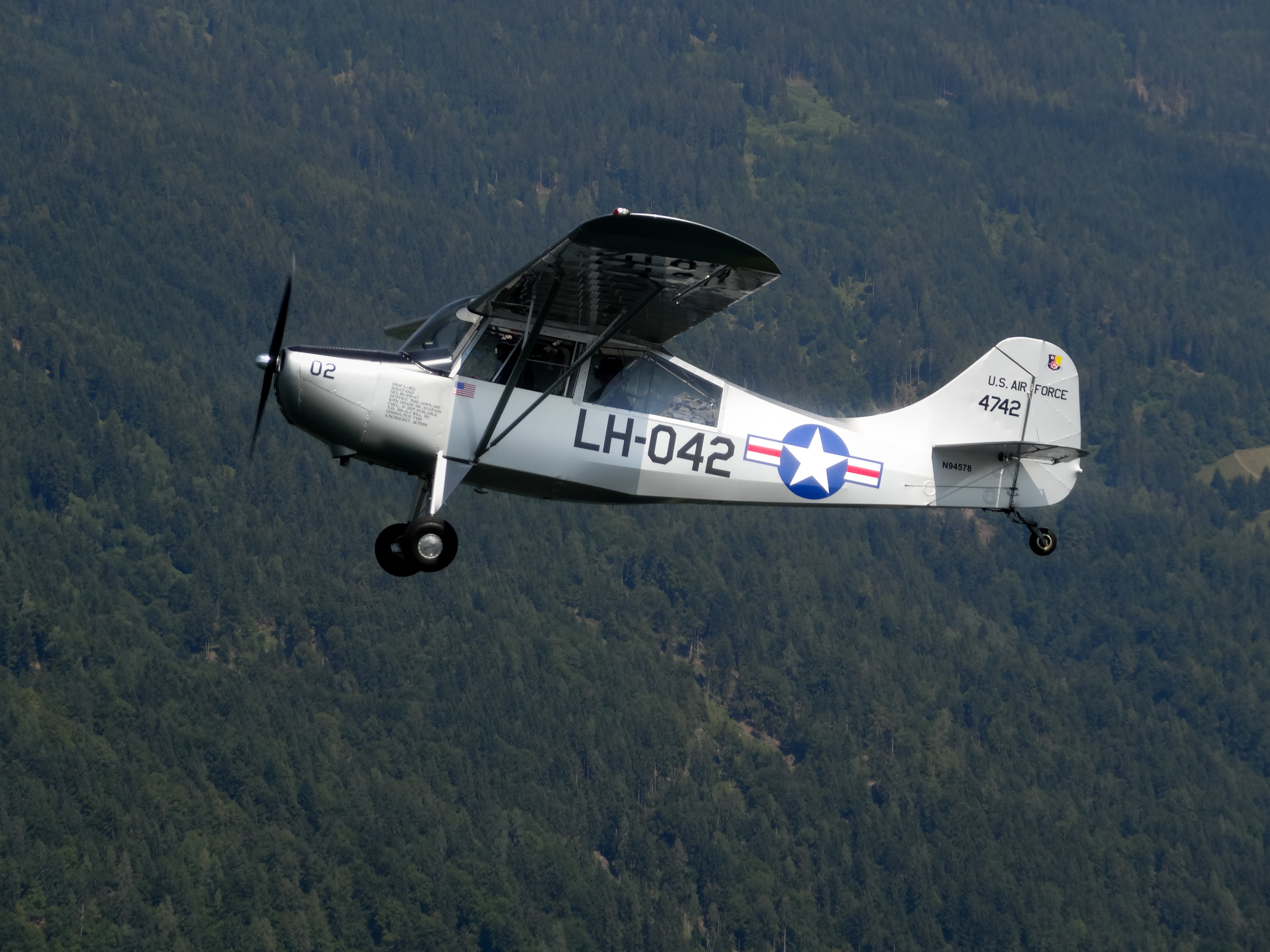
Aeronca L-16

=== 7B-X ===
Prototype, 1 produced, serial number 7-BX-1, FAA aircraft registration number was N4084E but registration was canceled on 4 October 1951, no other details known.

=== 7CCM, L-16B ===
An improved version of the L-16, the L-16B/7CCM featured a 90 hp (67 kW) Continental C90-8 engine, an enlarged vertical tail, hydraulic brakes, and a gross weight increase to 1,300 lb (590 kg); an additional gross weight increase to 1,350 lb (610 kg) is allowed when "Long Stroke Oleo Landing Gear" is installed and placard, "Intentional spinning prohibited when baggage carried", is installed on the instrument panel. An additional 5.5 US gal (21 L; 4.6 imp gal) fuel tank is used, increasing total fuel capacity to 18.5 US gal (70 L; 15.4 imp gal). Gross weight increases to 1,400 lb (640 kg) when configured as an S7CCM floatplane. 100 L-16B/7CCM aircraft were built.

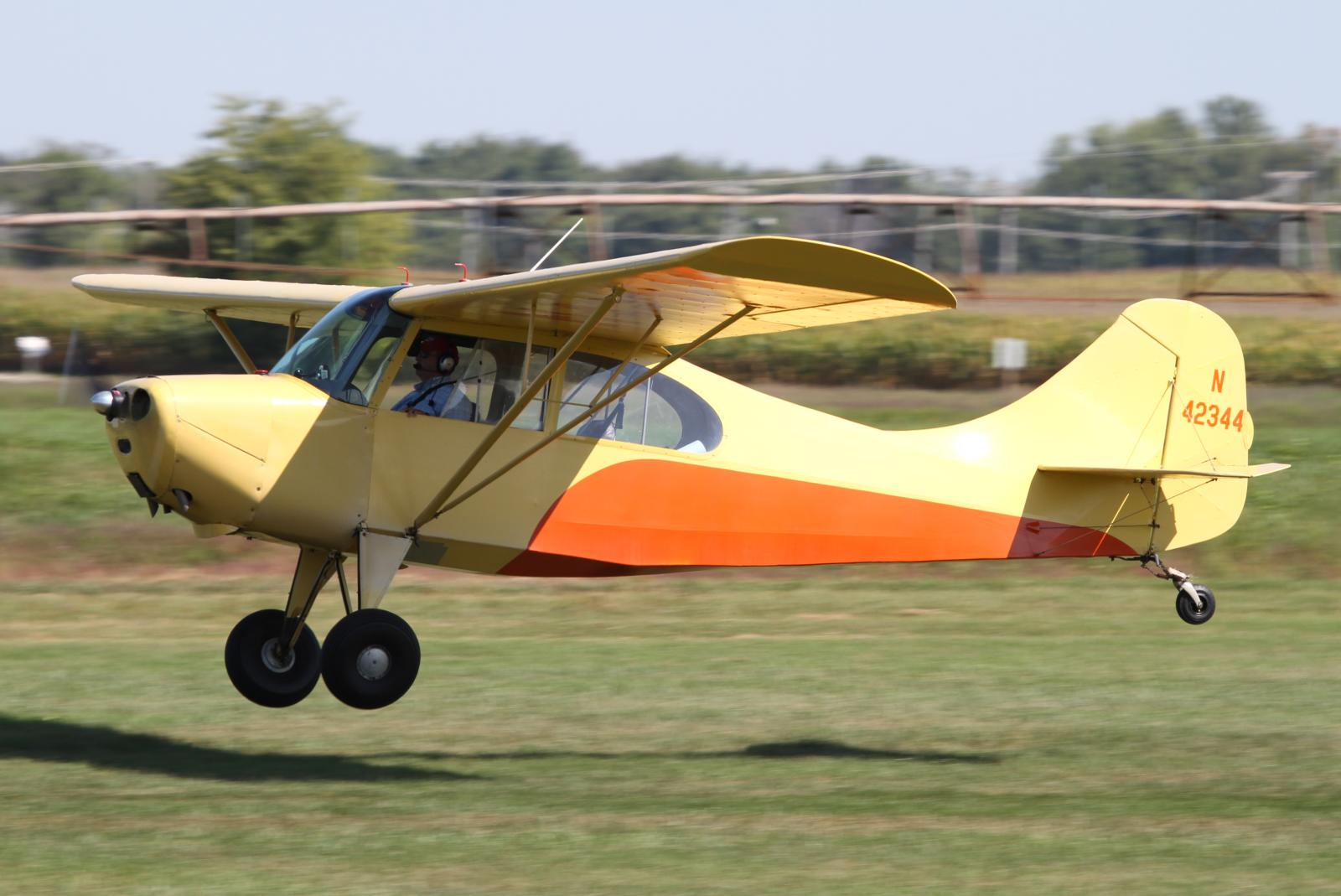
Aeronca 7DC

=== 7DC ===
Similar to 7CCM but with Continental C85 engine of 85 hp (63 kW); the derived S7DC floatplane had a gross weight increase to 1,400 lb (640 kg). 100 7DC aircraft were produced.

=== 7EC Traveler ===
1950 brought the introduction of the Aeronca 7EC, which features a Continental C90-12F engine of 90 horsepower (67 kW), standard long-throw oleo strut main gear, thicker seat cushions, additional interior insulation for noise reduction, an improved heater and electrical system, the addition of a parking brake, and a change in center of gravity for enhanced speed. Advertised empty weight is 890 lb (400 kg). Standard gross weight is 1,450 lb (660 kg), or 1,300 lb (590 kg) with "Lower End Landing Gear Oleo Strut Assembly." Standard fuel capacity is unchanged from the 7DC; an optional 26 US gal (98 L; 22 imp gal) system was offered, increasing the manufacturer's empty weight by 30 lb (14 kg). The optional S7EC floatplane configuration has a gross weight of 1,474 lb (669 kg).

The last Champ produced at Aeronca was a 7EC, and when Champion reintroduced the Champ in 1955, it was with their version of the 7EC, very little changed from Aeronca's. An enhanced version called the Champion DeLuxe Traveler offered a metal propeller with spinner, wheel pants, a steerable tailwheel, and navigation lights.

773 7EC aircraft were produced during the original production run.

In late 2007, American Champion introduced a revised version of the 7EC, featuring the Continental O-200-A engine of 100 horsepower (75 kW). Differing in a number of ways from earlier 7ECs, this new version in particular replaced the wood-spar wings of the earlier versions with a metal-spar wing and used aluminum gear legs. To fit within the Light Sport requirements, the maximum weight was reduced to 1,320 pounds (599 kilograms). The aircraft was discontinued by mid-2019.

=== 7FC Tri-Traveler ===
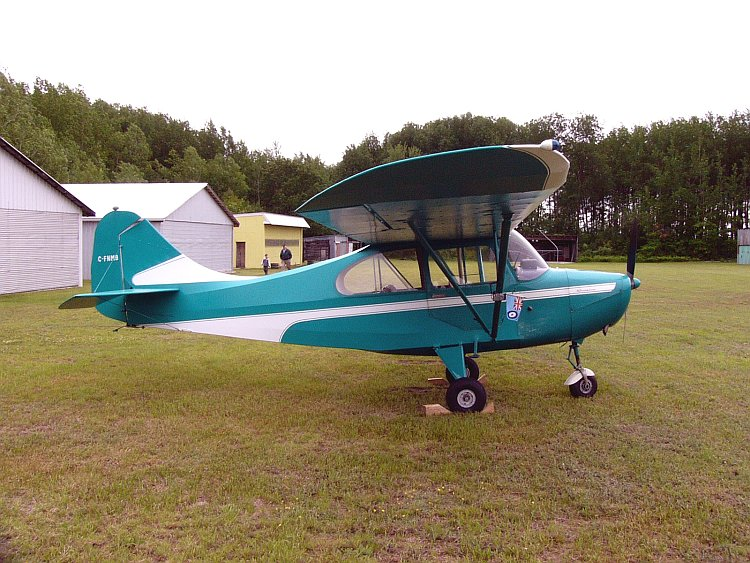
Champion 7FC Tri-Traveller

In 1957, Champion brought out the 7FC, which is similar to the 7EC but with tricycle landing gear instead of conventional (tailwheel) gear, oleo struts on all 3 wheels, and extra frame bracing for the nosewheel. Factory standard equipment was comparable to the 7EC DeLuxe Traveler. The 7FC is 3 mph (4.8 km/h) slower and 90 lb (41 kg) heavier than an equivalent 7EC, with a standard useful load of 540 lb (245 kg), compared with 630 lb (286 kg) for the 7EC; both use the 90 hp (67 kW) Continental C90-12F engine. Standard gross weight of the 7FC is 1,450 lb (660 kg) with an increase to 1,500 lb (680 kg) allowed with the installation of "Wide Track Main Gear."

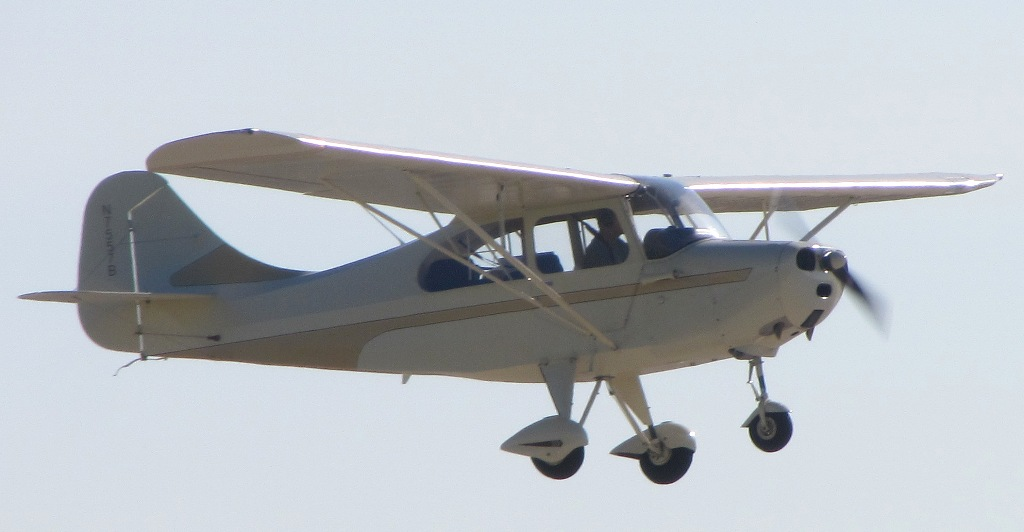
1957 7FC

472 7FC aircraft were built.

=== 7GC Sky Trac ===
Generally similar to 7EC but with a 140 hp (104 kW) Lycoming O-290-D2B engine and modified fuselage structure for increased gross weight. Gross weight is 1,650 lb (750 kg) in standard configuration, 1,732 lb (786 kg) in seaplane configuration. 171 were produced.

=== 7GCA Sky Trac ===
Agricultural variant of the 7GC with identical gross weight but with a 150 hp (112 kW) Lycoming O-320-A2B engine. 396 were made.

=== 7GCB Challenger ===
Based on 7GCA, but with enlarged flaps and increased wing area. 195 built.

=== 7HC DX'er ===
Similar to 7GC with identical gross weights for landplane and floatplane versions, but with a front seat control yoke instead of a control stick, modified fuselage structure, tricycle landing gear, and an enlarged rear seat for two occupants. 39 were produced.

=== 7JC Tri-Con ===
Similar to 7EC but with reverse tricycle undercarriage; however, the aircraft may be converted to a standard tailwheel undercarriage and operated at a 1,500 lb (680 kg) gross weight. 25 were built.

=== 7KC Olympia ===
7GCA with smaller wings, redesigned empennage, other aerodynamic refinements, deletion of rear-seat flight controls, and minor detail changes. 4 were built.

== Specifications (7AC) ==
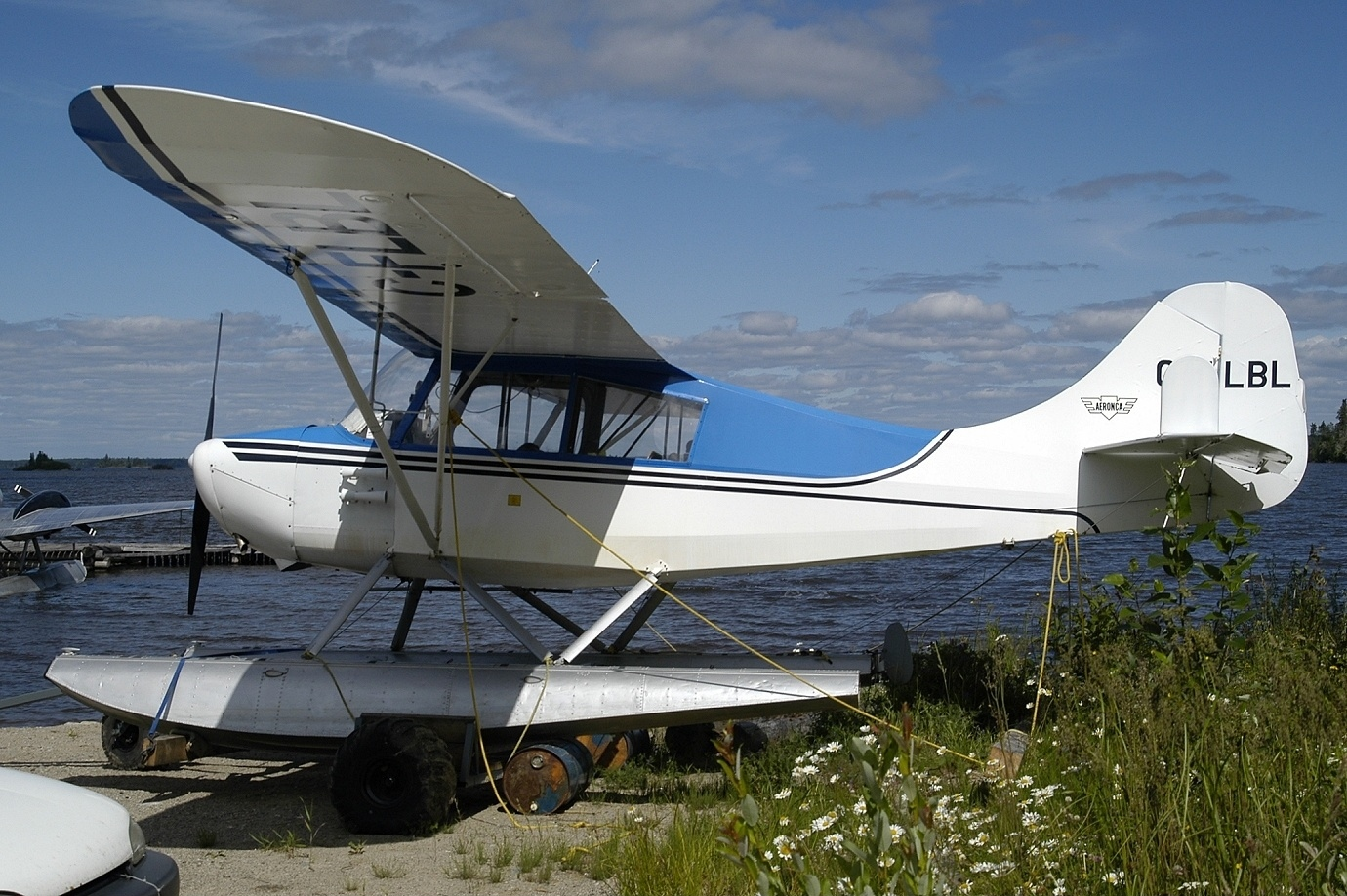
Aeronca 7AC Champion on floats

Data from FAA Type Certification Data Sheet, Plane & Pilot and Montgomery

General characteristics

- Crew: one
- Capacity: one passenger
- Length: 21 ft 6 in (6.55 m)
- Wingspan: 35 ft 0 in (10.67 m)
- Empty weight: 740 lb (336 kg)
- Gross weight: 1,220 lb (553 kg)
- Fuel capacity: 13 U.S. gallons (49 L; 11 imp gal)
- Powerplant: 1 × Continental A65-8 four cylinder, horizontally opposed piston aircraft engine, 65 hp (48 kW)
- Propellers: 2-bladed fixed pitch, wooden

Performance

- Maximum speed: 95 mph (153 km/h, 83 kn)
- Cruise speed: 85 mph (137 km/h, 74 kn)
- Stall speed: 38 mph (61 km/h, 33 kn)
- Never exceed speed: 129 mph (208 km/h, 112 kn)
- Range: 270 mi (430 km, 230 nmi)
- Service ceiling: 12,500 ft (3,800 m)
- Rate of climb: 370 ft/min (1.9 m/s)

== See also ==
Related development

- Aeronca Chief family
- Aeronca Chief
- Bellanca Citabria
- Champion Lancer

Aircraft of comparable role, configuration, and era

- Interstate Cadet
- Luscombe T-8F
- Piper J-3 Cub
- Porterfield 65 Collegiate
- Taylorcraft L-2
