= Champion Lancer =

1960s twin-engine trainer aircraft

Champion 402 Lancer
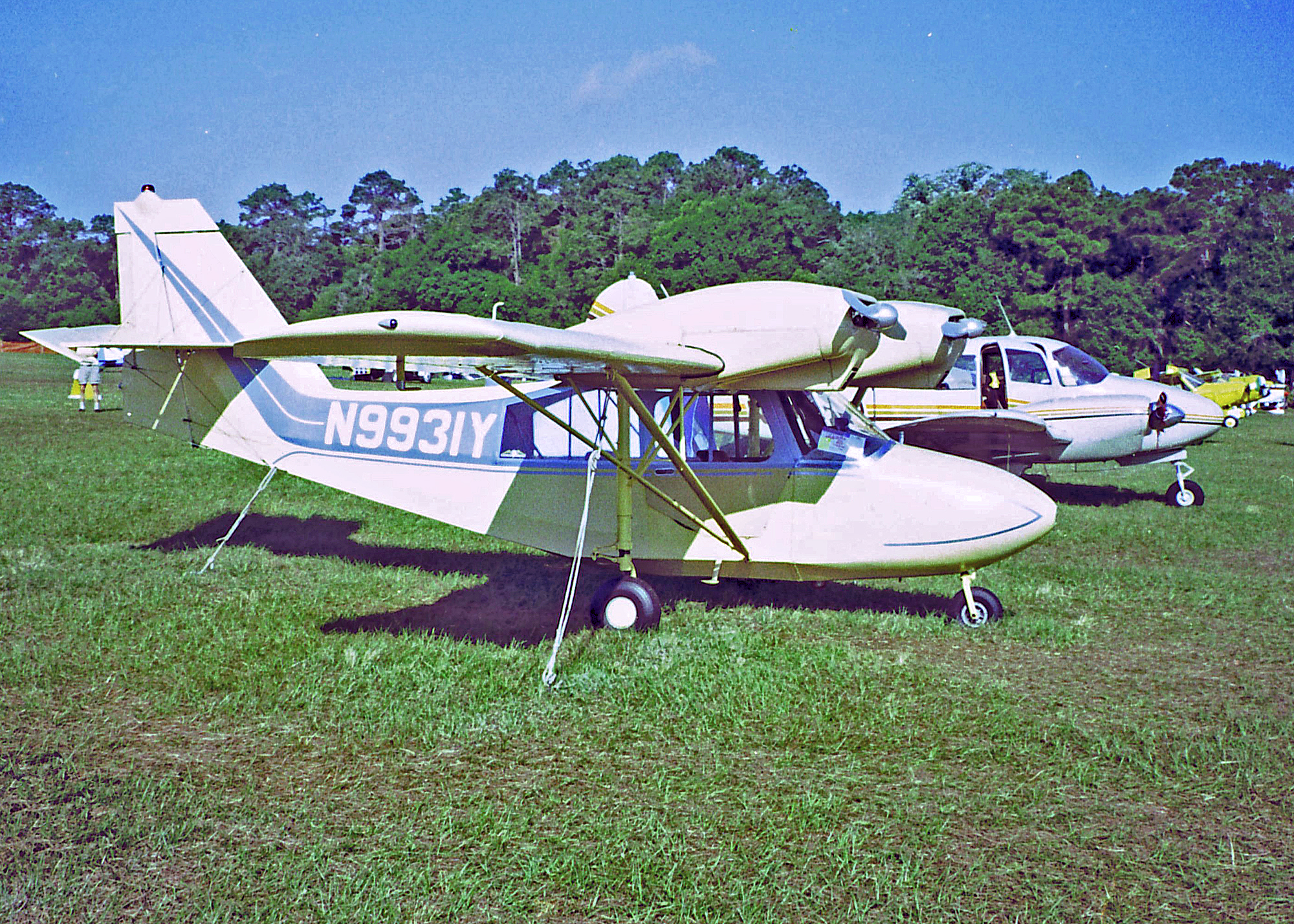

General information
- Type: Civil training aircraft
- Manufacturer: Champion Aircraft Corporation
- Number built: 25-36

History
- Manufactured: 1963
- Introduction date: 1963
- First flight: 1961
- Developed from: Champion 7FC Tri-Traveler

The Champion 402 Lancer is a twin-engine trainer produced by Champion Aircraft, a high-wing monoplane based on the tricycle gear Champion 7FC Tri-Traveler, but with wing-mounted Continental O-200-A engines. The Lancer first flew in 1961 and production began in 1963. The Lancer seats two in a tandem configuration with dual flight controls; the pilot in command or student pilot normally occupies the front seat.

== Design and development ==
The Lancer achieved its goal of being the least expensive American-built twin engine airplane. Other design goals included simplicity, ease of maintenance, low operating costs, and the ability to operate from rough or unimproved strips. The high wing and high engine position give good propeller clearance in achieving that last goal. The Lancer is of metal tube construction with fiberglass covering and has fixed landing gear and propellers.

The Lancer was designed specifically for flight schools seeking an inexpensive way to train students for a multi-engine rating, a role in which the craft's modest performance and payload were anticipated to matter little. To increase its appeal to flight schools, the Lancer has a mock landing gear retraction switch that operates simulated landing gear lights in the cockpit, allowing a student pilot to feign operation of retractable landing gear on takeoff and landing during instructional flights (the actual landing gear is permanently fixed). In a peculiar combination, the front seat is equipped with a control yoke, while the rear-seat pilot has a centre stick. (Note: Single-engine tandem Champion models generally have centre sticks for both pilots, while the single-engine side-by-side Aeronca Chief family generally uses dual control yokes.) Both seats are equipped with engine controls mounted overhead, with solo flight being performed from the front seat. Braking is controlled with a lever on the right-hand side of the front-seat instrument panel; differential braking is not possible, and no brake controls are provided for the rear-seat pilot. Other features included single-slotted wing flaps with 4 adjustment positions, and pilot-adjustable trim tabs for the elevator and rudder; (Note: Aileron trim was ground-adjustable only.) elevator trim is adjusted using a sidewall-mounted lever. (Note: The elevator trim lever in single-engine tandem Champion models is typically mounted overhead between the seats.)

The prototype Lancer underwent development between 1961 and the start of production in 1963. The changes included relocating the engine nacelles to their final position above the wing, strengthening the wings to accommodate the engines, and redesigning the empennage to provide for twin-engine control requirements. The Federal Aviation Administration type certificate was approved on 7 March 1963.

=== Flight characteristics ===
The Lancer's performance when flying on a single engine is notably poor; in a column for AOPA Pilot, author Barry Schiff summarized the airplane's single-engine performance by writing that "...it doesn’t have any". Since the Lancer's fixed-pitch propellers cannot be feathered in flight, the failed engine's propeller generally continues to windmill, creating prodigious drag and yaw. With the other engine delivering full power, the Lancer's advertised engine-out ceiling is only 2,000 feet (610 m) at standard temperature and pressure – an altitude below ground level in many geographical areas, particularly once adverse density altitude conditions are taken into account. An engine-out situation typically results in a descent rate of about 250 ft/min (1.3 m/s), and the Lancer's single-engine, best-rate-of-climb speed V_{Y_{SE}}–generally a gauge of engine-out climb performance for other airplanes–has been characterized as actually being a "single-engine, least-rate-of-coming-down-speed." Flying magazine noted that the craft could generally maintain altitude at or below 2,200 feet (670 m) and was reasonably easy to fly at airfield traffic pattern altitude (Note: The test flight was performed in and around Houston, Texas, a geographical area with an altitude very close to sea level, although density altitude is said to have been high during the test.) on a single engine, but that an engine-out go-around would be potentially risky, and that a pilot is best advised "...to commit [himself or herself] to land–then land".

Criticisms of the Lancer are not limited to its single-engine performance or lack thereof. The engine nacelle placement hampers visibility, particularly for the rear-seat pilot, and for both pilots during banked turns. Schiff compares the engine nacelles to "...horse blinders that [result] in disorienting tunnel vision". The close proximity of the engines and propellers to the front-seat pilot's head create elevated noise levels described as "remarkable" or even "paralyzing". The sidewall-mounted elevator trim lever looks very similar to the throttle lever of the single-engine Aeronca Champion, but pushing the lever forward results in nose-down trim rather than increased engine power as in most Champion types; this creates a risk that an experienced Champion pilot may confuse the two controls when piloting the Lancer, with potentially catastrophic consequences if he or she instinctively pushes the lever fully forward to arrest an unwanted rate of descent. The 1 inch (25 mm) wide vertical center bar in the windshield impairs the pilot's view of the runway on landing.

With both engines functioning, the Lancer is relatively slow in cruise and exhibits a mediocre climb rate, particularly given its twin-engine layout and resultant higher operating costs compared to a single-engine airplane. Its lackluster performance is generally attributed to abundant form drag from the wing and tailplane struts and unusually large strut-braced fixed main landing gear legs, which are about 3 inches (76 mm) in diameter and 5 feet (1.5 m) long. In most respects, the Lancer's flight performance is equal or slightly inferior to that of the popular Cessna 150, an airplane that uses a single O-200 engine rather than two.

== Operational history ==
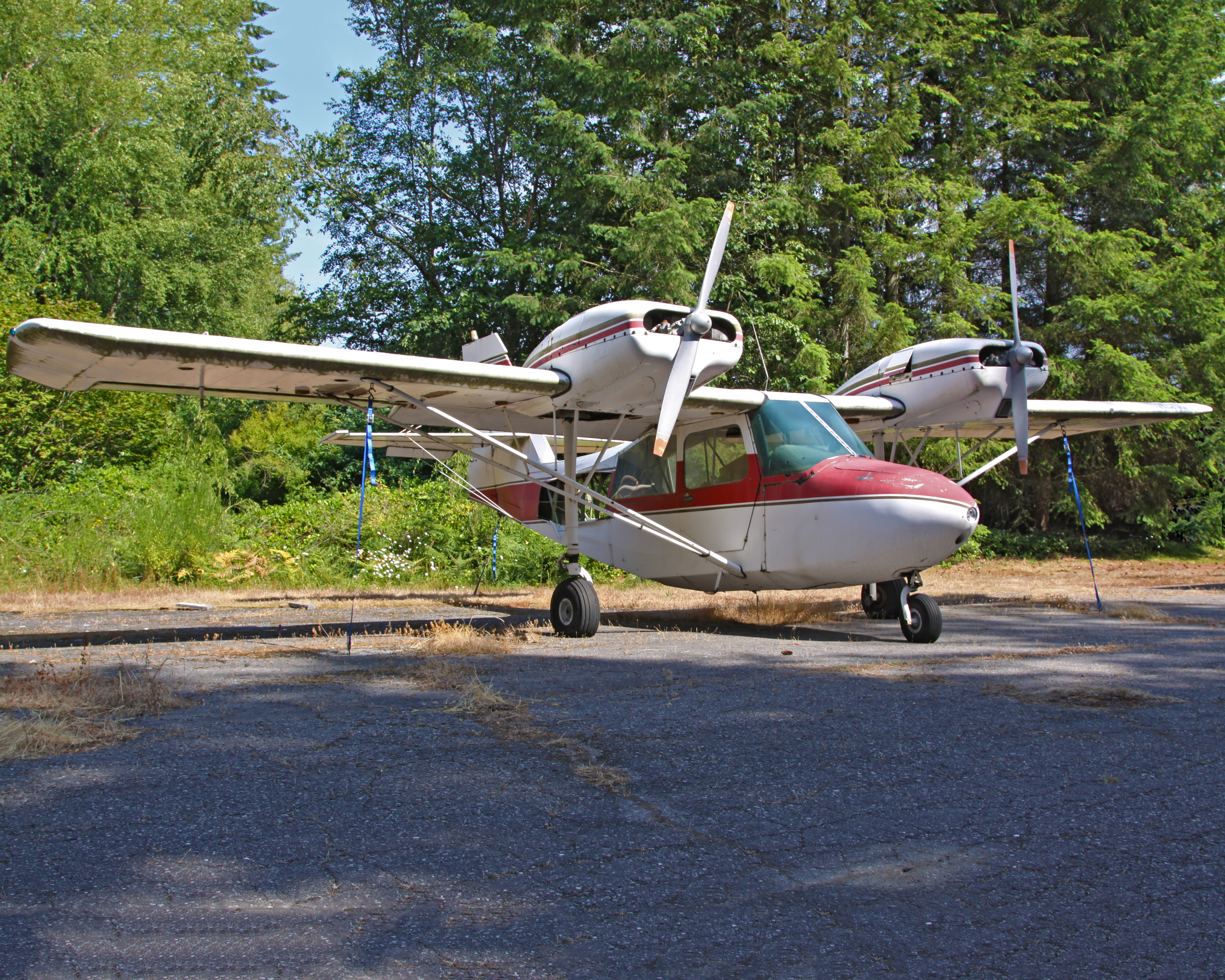
A Champion Lancer, sitting derelict at Arlington Municipal Airport, Arlington, Washington, United States, in 2017

Some flight schools initially viewed the Lancer's marginal single-engine performance favorably, as students trained in a Lancer found other twin-engine types comparatively easy to fly. However, sales were very limited; production began in 1963 and ended later in the same year with only 25 to 36 aircraft built. As of March 2019, the highest serial number of any 402 Lancer in the FAA aircraft registry was 25.

As of 2018, FAA flight test standards require a pilot to demonstrate feathering a propeller during the practical test to obtain a multiengine rating; this effectively makes it impossible to complete the test in a Lancer with its fixed-pitch props.

Despite the aircraft's drawbacks, Lancer ownership has been described as potentially attractive because it is "...an oddity and rarity of aviation..." and "Its appearance does attract and invite attention."

As of March 2019, nine Lancers remain on the FAA registry, the type certificate is held by American Champion, and the Lancer's ICAO aircraft type designator is CH40. The National Transportation Safety Board Aviation Accident Database indicates that 12 accidents and incidents involving 9 individual Champion 402 aircraft occurred between 27 May 1964 and 27 July 1993 in the United States. The only fatal Lancer accident in the database occurred on 18 January 1970 in Tarentum, Pennsylvania after a fuel system fault caused both engines to fail; the subsequent off-airport forced landing substantially damaged the aircraft and killed the pilot and sole occupant. Of the 12 reported accidents and incidents, 4 involved single-engine operations.

== Specifications (Champion 402) ==
Data from Flying, unless otherwise noted

General characteristics

- Crew: one
- Capacity: one passenger
- Length: 22 ft 3 in (6.78 m)
- Wingspan: 34.45 ft (10.50 m)
- Height: 10 ft (3.0 m)
- Wing area: 170 sq ft (16 m^{2})
- Empty weight: 1,790 lb (812 kg)
- Gross weight: 2,450 lb (1,111 kg)
- Fuel capacity: 57 U.S. gallons (220 L; 47 imp gal)
- Powerplant: 2 × Continental O-200 , 100 hp (75 kW) each
- Propellers: 2-bladed McCauley fixed pitch

Performance

- Maximum speed: 110 kn (130 mph, 210 km/h)
- Cruise speed: 103 kn (118 mph, 190 km/h)
- Stall speed: 56 kn (64 mph, 103 km/h)
- Never exceed speed: 141 kn (162 mph, 261 km/h)
- Range: 390 nmi (450 mi, 720 km)
- Service ceiling: 14,500 ft (4,400 m)
- Rate of climb: 600 ft/min (3.0 m/s)
