= Champion Aircraft =

Light aircraft manufacturer

Champion Aircraft Corporation
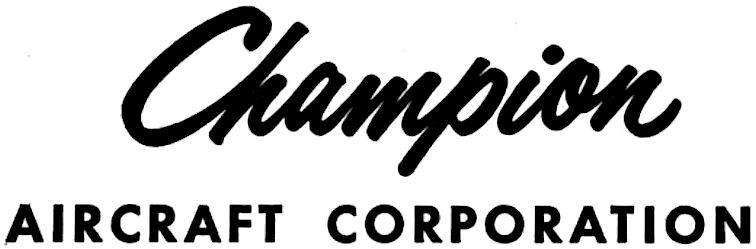
- Company type: Private
- Industry: General Aviation
- Founded: 1954; 71 years ago
- Founder: Robert "Bob" Brown
- Defunct: 1970
- Fate: Acquired by Bellanca Aircraft Corporation
- Successor: Bellanca Aircraft Corporation; American Champion
- Headquarters: Osceola, Wisconsin, United States
- Products: Light aircraft

Champion Aircraft Corporation was an aircraft manufacturer founded by Robert "Bob" Brown that purchased the design for the Aeronca Champion, a light aircraft previously built by the Aeronca Aircraft Corporation, in 1954. Through the 1950s and the 1960s Champion introduced variations on the 7-series design. Champion also developed and began production of the significantly upgraded follow-on to the 7-series, the 8KCAB Decathlon, as well as the twin-engined Lancer. Champion was acquired in 1970 by Bellanca Aircraft Corporation, which continued to produce the Champion aircraft line at the former Champion plant.

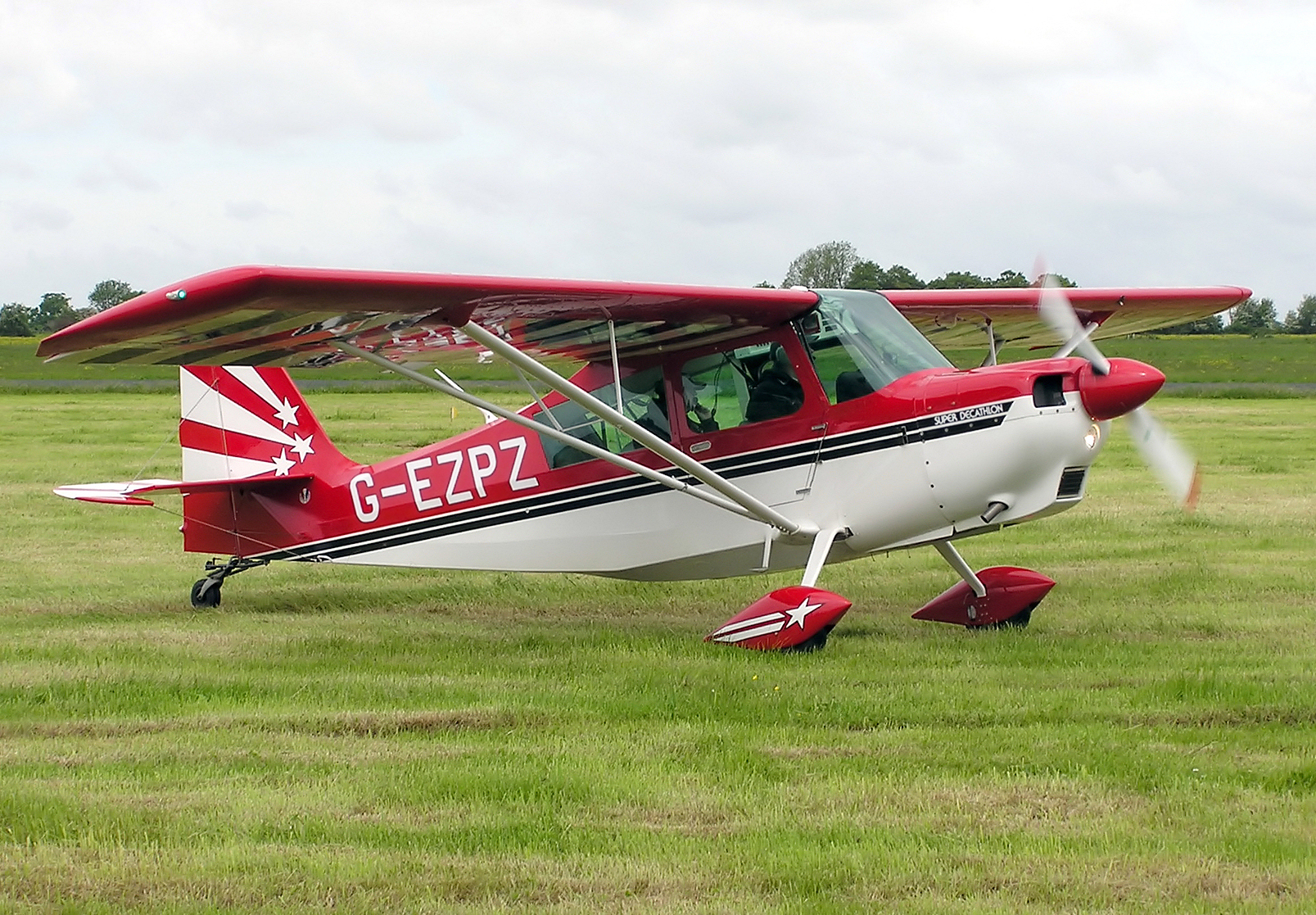
8KCAB Super Decathlon, built 2005

== Aircraft ==
Champion was originally Flyers Service Inc., an aircraft maintenance company headed by Robert "Bob" Brown and located at Holman Field in Saint Paul, Minnesota. In 1954, the company purchased the type certificate for the Aeronca Champion design from Aeronca, and changed its name and realigned its focus to manufacturing the Champion line of aircraft. By the time Aeronca ceased production in 1951, they had advanced the design through the 7BCM, 7CCM, and 7DC, reaching the 7EC. It was this model with which Champion commenced production in 1954, giving it the name "Traveler" to go along with the alphanumeric model designation. (Champion assigned both alphanumeric designations and names to most of its designs.) Bob Brown subsequently relocated the production line to Osceola, Wisconsin, at the L.O. Simenstad Municipal Airport.

All aircraft Champion introduced were related to the original Aeronca design. Champion's aircraft, by date of Federal Aviation Administration approval or Champion introduction, are:

Model name	First flight	Number built	Type
Champion 7EC Traveler			Single engine cabin monoplane
Champion 7FC Tri-Traveler		472	Single engine cabin monoplane
Champion 7GC Sky-Trac		171	Single engine cabin monoplane
Champion 7HC DX'er		39	Single engine cabin monoplane
Champion 7GCA Sky Trac		396	Single engine cabin monoplane
Champion 7JC Tri-Con		25	Single engine cabin monoplane
Champion 7GCB Challenger			Single engine cabin monoplane
Champion 7KC Olympia		4	Single engine cabin monoplane
Champion 7GCBA Challenger			Single engine cabin monoplane
Champion 402 Lancer		25-36	Twin engine cabin monoplane
Champion 7ECA Citabria			Single engine cabin monoplane
Champion 7GCAA Citabria			Single engine cabin monoplane
Champion 7GCBC Citabria			Single engine cabin monoplane
Champion 7KCAB Citabria			Single engine cabin monoplane
Champion 8KCAB Decathlon			Single engine cabin monoplane
Champion 9KCAB Citabria Pro			Single engine open cockpit monoplane

Champion was acquired in 1970 by Bellanca Aircraft Corporation, which continued to produce most of the Champion designs at the former Champion plant in Osceola. Soon after the acquisition, the plant burned down.
