= American Champion =

Aircraft manufacturer

American Champion Aircraft Corporation
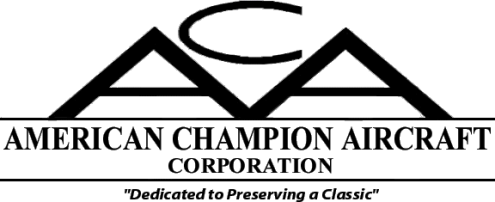
- Type: Privately held company
- Industry: General Aviation
- Founded: 1988
- Headquarters: Rochester, Wisconsin
- Key people: Jerry Mehlhaff Sr. - President and co-owner; Char Mehlhaff - VP-CFO and co-owner; Jerry Mehlhaff Jr. - VP, Engineering
- Products: Champ, Citabria, Scout, Super Decathlon
- Website: americanchampionaircraft.com

American Champion Aircraft Corporation is a manufacturer of general aviation aircraft headquartered at the Rochester, Wisconsin, airport. Founded in 1988 on the acquisition of the Champ, Citabria, Scout, and Decathlon, it has been producing replacement parts for these aircraft since that time. It has also been producing new aircraft since 1990.

The Champ, Citabria, Decathlon, and Scout designs were obtained from Bellanca which had acquired Champion Aircraft Corporation in 1970. While Bellanca was responsible for the design of the Scout, the designs and type certificates for the Champ, Citabria and Decathlon originated from Champion Aircraft Corporation.

== Aircraft ==
Model name	First flight	Number built	Type
American Champion 7EC Champ	1944		2 seat general aviation aircraft
American Champion 7ECA/7GC Citabria	1964		2 seat general aviation aircraft
American Champion 8GCBC Scout	1974	500	2 seat general aviation aircraft
American Champion 8KCAB Decathlon	1970	1,000	2 seat general aviation aircraft
American Champion 8KCAB Super Decathlon	1990	1,050	2 seat general aviation aircraft
American Champion 8KCAB Xtreme Decathlon	2012	30	2 seat general aviation aircraft
