= Longeron =

Load-bearing component of a framework

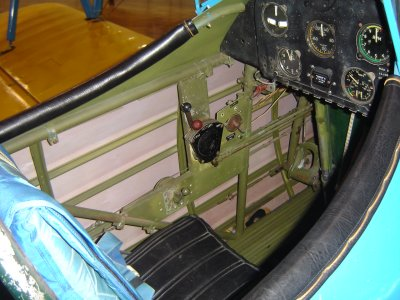
Interior of a Boeing/Stearman PT-17 showing small channel section stringers

In engineering, a longeron or stringer is a load-bearing component of a framework.

The term is commonly used in connection with aircraft fuselages and automobile chassis. Longerons are used in conjunction with stringers to form structural frameworks.

== Aircraft ==
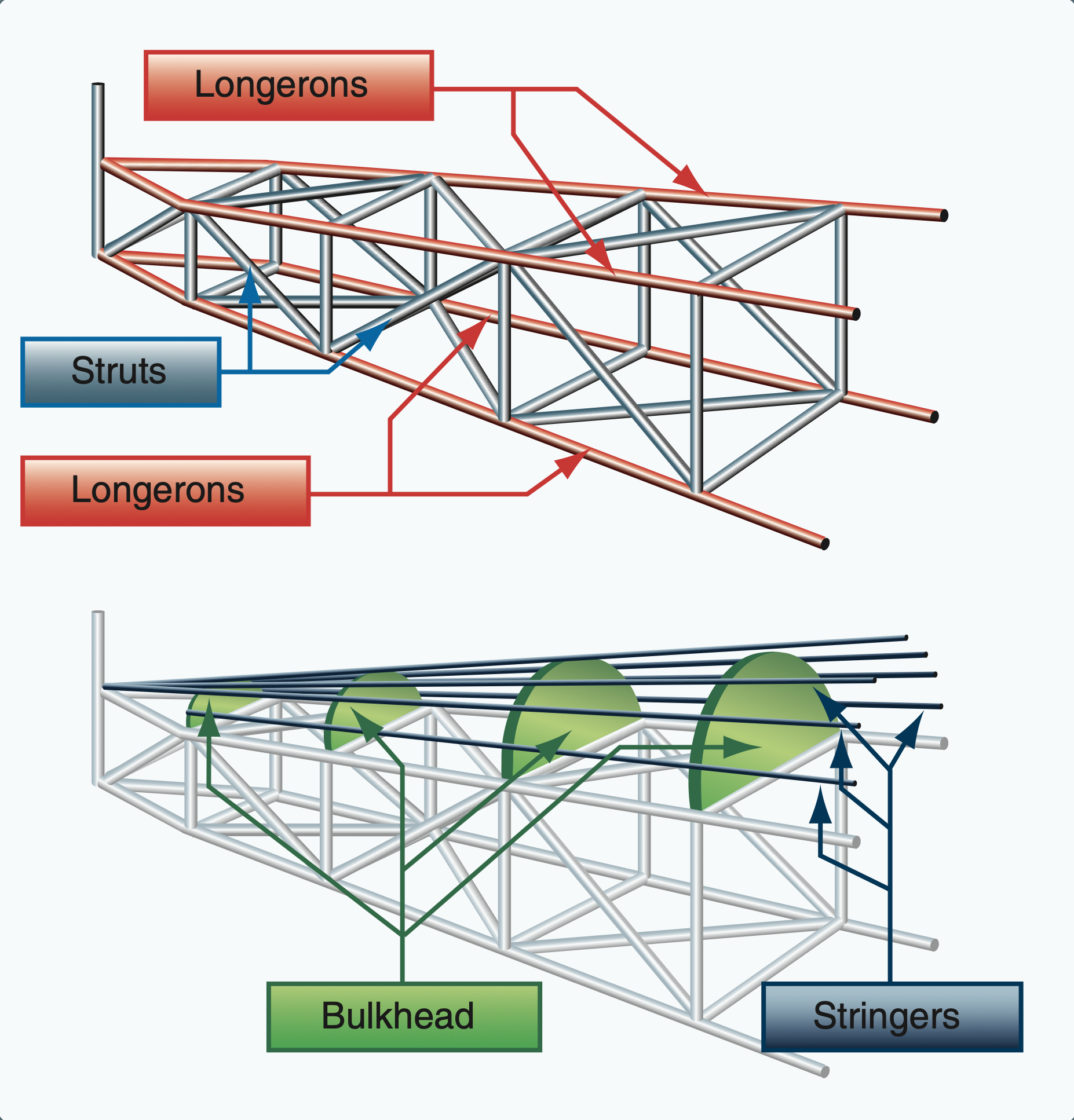
Longerons, struts and stringers in a truss type fuselage structure

In an aircraft fuselage, stringers are attached to formers (also called frames) and run in the longitudinal direction of the aircraft. They are primarily responsible for transferring the aerodynamic loads acting on the skin onto the frames and formers. In the wings or horizontal stabilizer, longerons run spanwise (from wing root to wing tip) and attach between the ribs. The primary function here also is to transfer the bending loads acting on the wings onto the ribs and spar.

The terms "longeron" and "stringer" are sometimes used interchangeably. Historically, though, there is a subtle difference between the two terms. If the longitudinal members in a fuselage are few in number (usually 4 to 8) and run all along the fuselage length, then they are called "longerons". The longeron system also requires that the fuselage frames be closely spaced (about every 4 to 6 in or 10 to 15 cm). If the longitudinal members are numerous (usually 50 to 100) and are placed just between two formers/frames, then they are called "stringers". In the stringer system the longitudinal members are smaller and the frames are spaced further apart (about 15 to 20 in or 38 to 51 cm). Generally, longerons are of larger cross-section when compared to stringers. On large modern aircraft the stringer system is more common because it is more weight-efficient, despite being more complex to construct and analyze. Some aircraft use a combination of both stringers and longerons.

Longerons often carry larger loads than stringers and also help to transfer skin loads to internal structure. Longerons nearly always attach to frames or ribs. Stringers are usually not attached to anything but the skin, where they carry a portion of the fuselage bending moment through axial loading. It is not uncommon to have a mixture of longerons and stringers in the same major structural component.

== Space launch vehicles ==
Stringers are also used in the construction of some launch vehicle propellant tanks. For example, the Falcon 9 launch vehicle uses stringers in the kerosene (RP-1) tanks, but not in the liquid oxygen tanks, on both the first and second stages.

== See also ==
- Index of aviation articles
