= Rib (aeronautics) =

Structural element of an aircraft wing

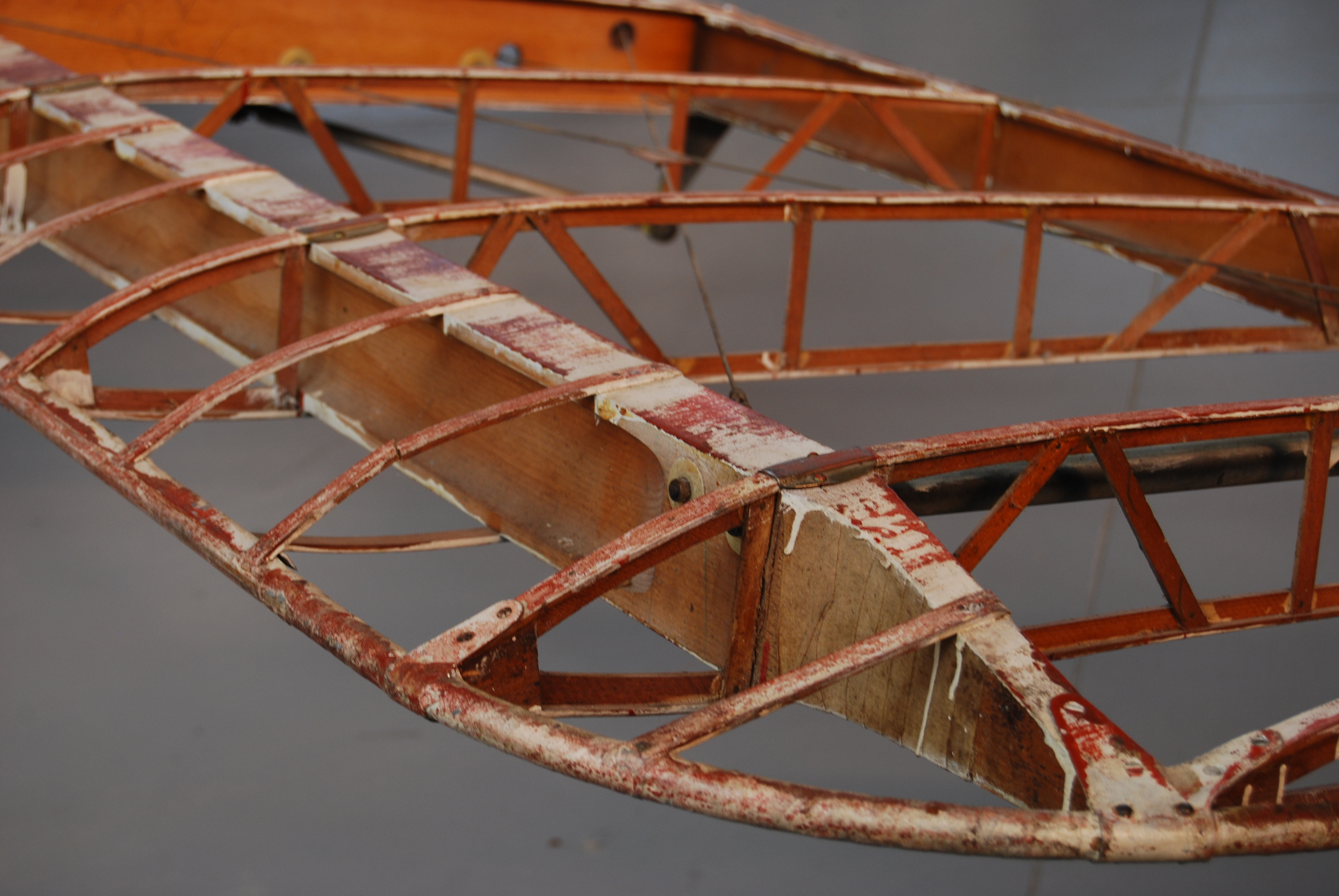
Wing ribs of a de Havilland DH.60 Moth

In an aircraft, ribs are forming elements of the airframe structure of a wing, especially in traditional construction.

By analogy with the anatomical definition of "rib", the ribs attach to the main spar, and by being repeated at frequent intervals, form a skeletal shape for the wing. Usually ribs incorporate the airfoil shape of the wing, and the skin adopts this shape when stretched over the ribs.

== Type of ribs ==
There are several types of ribs. Form-ribs, plate-type ribs, truss ribs, closed-ribs, forged ribs and milled ribs, where form-ribs are used for light to medium loading and milled ribs offer the greatest strength.

- Form-ribs are made from a sheet of metal bent into shape, such as a U-profile. This profile is placed on the skin, just like a stringer, but then in the other direction.
- Plate-type ribs consist of sheet-metal, which has upturned edges and (often has) weight-saving holes cut into it.
- Truss ribs are built up out of profiles that are joined together. These joints require great attention during design and manufacture. The ribs may be light or heavy in design which make them suitable for a wide range of loads.
- Closed-ribs are constructed from profiles and sheet metal and are suitable for closing off sections of the wing (e.g.: the fuel tank). Here too, particular care must be taken with the joints and this type of rib is also suitable for application in a variety of loading conditions.
- Forged ribs are manufactured using heavy press-machinery. The result is fairly rough; for more refined parts, high-pressure presses are required, which are very expensive. Forged pieces (usually) have to undergo further treatment (for smoother edges and holes). Forged ribs are used for sections where very high loads apply - near the undercarriage for example.
- Milled ribs are solid structures. They are manufactured by milling away excess material from a solid block of metal (usually using computer-controlled milling machines). The shape of these ribs is always accurately defined. Such ribs are used under similar conditions as those for forged ribs.

Ribs are made out of wood, metal, plastic, composites, foam. The wings of kites, hang gliders, paragliders, powered kites, powered hang gliders, ultralights, windmills are aircraft that have versions that use ribs to form the wing shape.

For full size and flying model aircraft wing structures that are usually made of wood, ribs can either be in one piece (forming the airfoil at that rib's "station" in the wing), or be in a three-piece format, with the rib web being the part that the one-piece rib consisted of, with capstrips for the upper and lower edging of the rib, running from the leading edge to the trailing edge, being the other two component parts.

== See also ==
- Index of aviation articles
