= Bellanca Cruisair =

American single-engined light aircraft

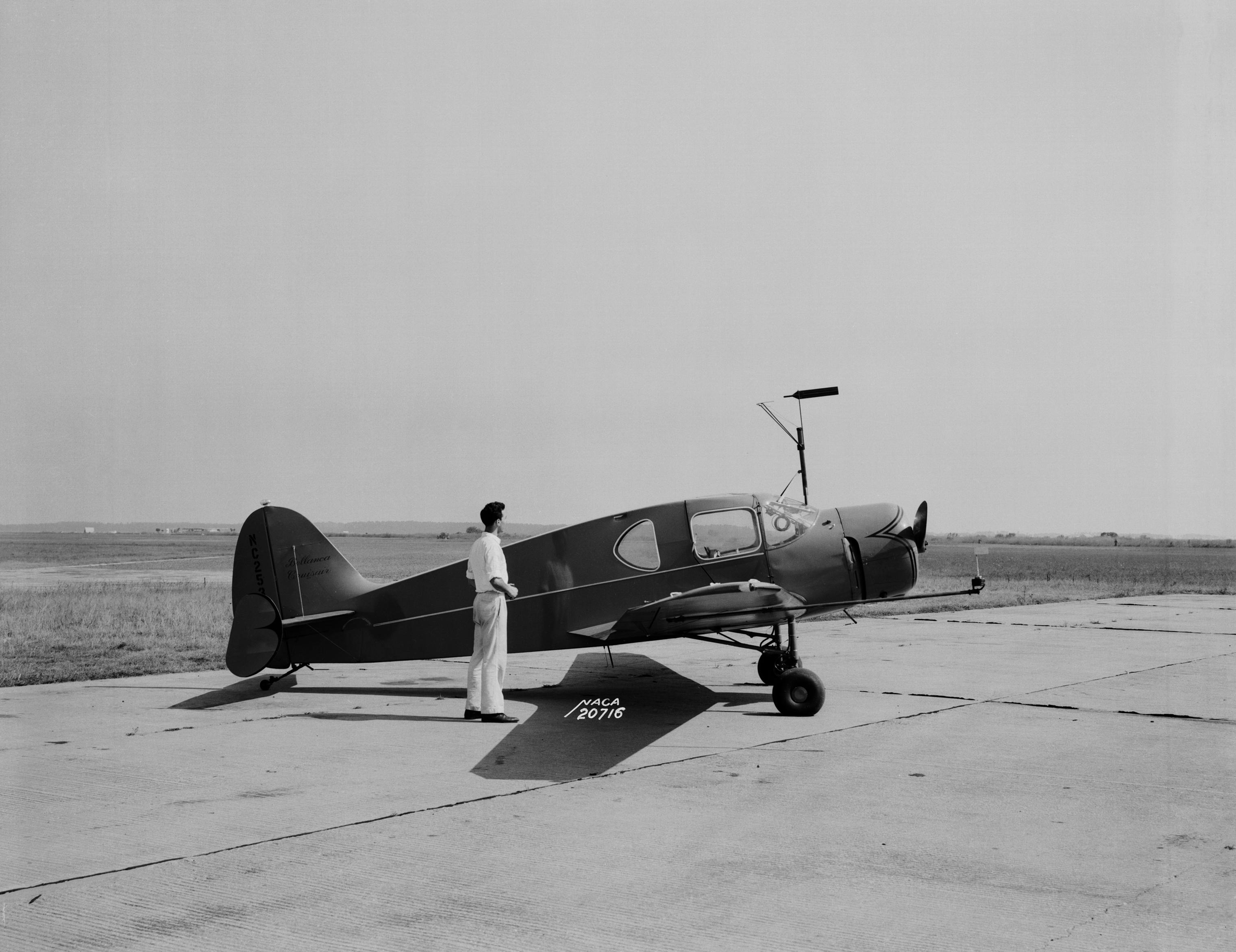
- Model 14-9

General information
- Type: Civil utility aircraft
- Manufacturer: Bellanca
- Designer: Giuseppe Mario Bellanca
- Number built: (pre-WWII ca. 50), (Model 14 post WWII ca.600), (Model 17 1,356)

History
- First flight: December 1937

The Bellanca 14-7 Cruisair and its successors were a family of single-engined light aircraft manufactured in the United States from the mid-1930s onwards.

== Design and development ==
Bellanca established itself in the market for 6-8 seat aircraft, but believed that it could also successfully sell smaller 3-4 seat aircraft. To fill this niche Bellanca designed The '14-7 Cruisair' as a modern, low-wing cantilever monoplane with a fuselage intended to contribute lift to the design. Although the prototype flew with fixed tailwheel undercarriage, the 14-9 production version was the first US light aircraft to be mass-produced with retractable undercarriage, the main wheels rotating aft into wheel-wells in the wings, with approximately 50 produced before production was interrupted by World War II.

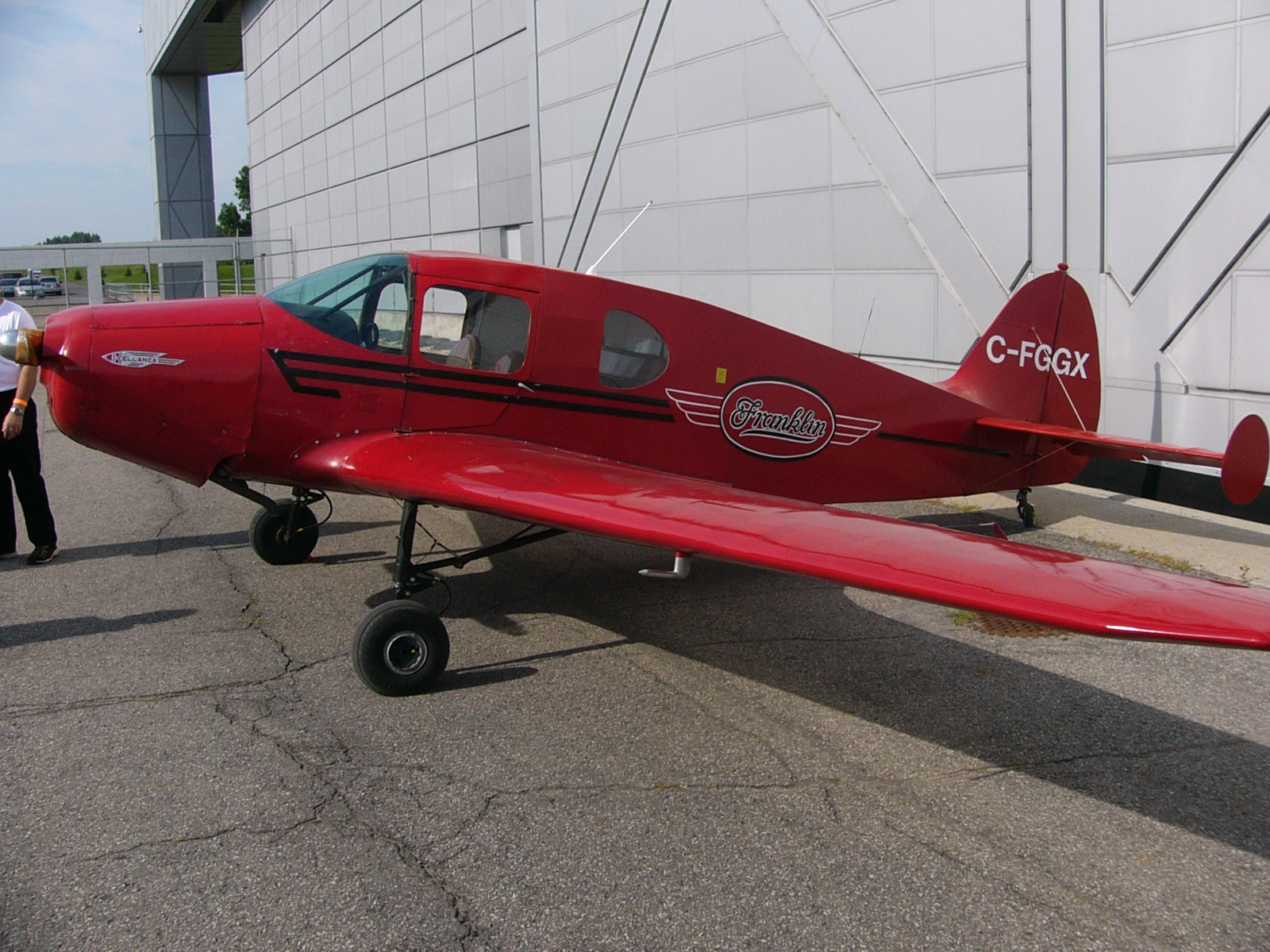
Bellanca 14-13-2

After WWII Bellanca resumed production with the up-dated Bellanca 14-13 Cruisair Senior, retaining the Bellanca 14-7's basic design, featuring an enlarged cabin, a horizontally opposed Franklin 6A4-335-B3 150 hp (112 kW) engine in place of the earlier models' Le Blond radial and an oval vertical endplate on each horizontal stabiliser. This latter feature gained the type the affectionate nickname "Cardboard Constellation", because the arrangement is similar to the contemporary Lockheed Constellation airliner.

The naming convention for Bellanca aircraft was followed with the Cruisair series, with the first number giving the wing area in square feet, (dropping the final digit), while the second number is the aircraft's horsepower, (again dropping the final digit).

Construction of the series is fairly conventional with wings constructed of spruce with plywood skin and fuselages built up from a welded steel-tube framework with a fabric covering. A constant process of refinement led to many variants, sometimes given new names but retaining the same structure differing only in powerplant, minor details and furnishings. The only major variations were the introduction of a single swept fin and tri-cycle retractable undercarriage. Production was carried out at a variety of companies, including Bellanca, Downer, Aviabellanca, Northern Aircraft and Inter-Air, with little variation other than powerplant and furnishings.

The highly responsive flying characteristics of the aircraft are evident to anyone who has flown one. Bill Cox, the well known aviation journalist at Plane and Pilot Magazine commented regarding the flying qualities of Vikings that they "have long been famous for control response and harmony that seems almost psychic in nature", and asserted, "Owners almost unanimously pronounce the Viking the best handling airplane they've ever flown."

Pre-war development culminated in the 1941 14-12, at which point production ceased to allow Bellanca to work as a military subcontractor for the duration of the war when an attempt to market a militarized version as a trainer was unsuccessful. After the war, Bellanca returned to the design to create the Bellanca 14-13 and its successors.

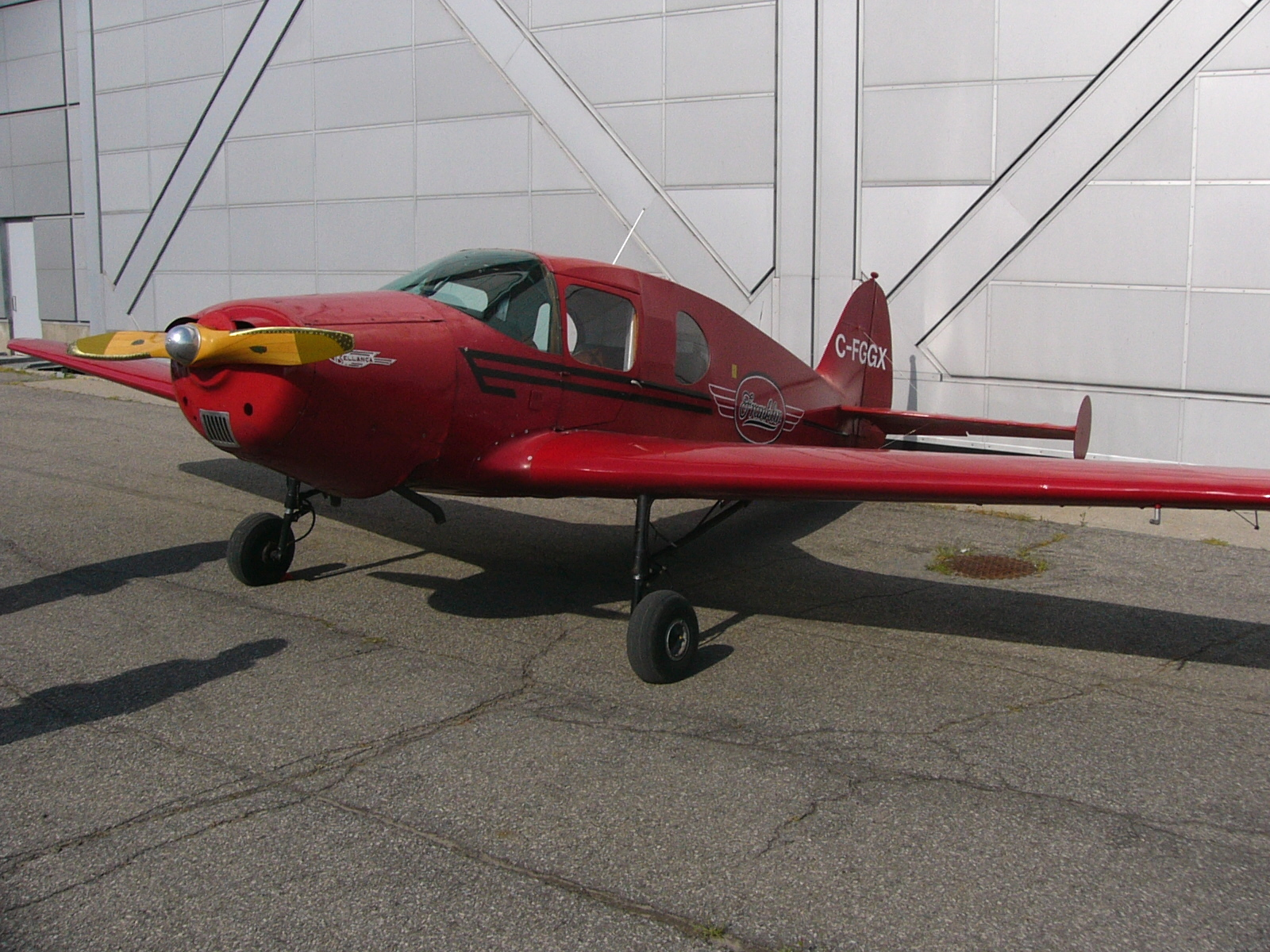
Bellanca 14-13-2

=== Model 14-13 ===
The 14-13 was introduced in 1946; in its improved 14-13-3 version the aircraft remained in production until 1956.

=== Model 14-19 ===
A higher performance design revision was granted FAA approval as the 14-19 Cruisemaster on September 26, 1949. The new model featured structural upgrades, a 190 hp (142 kW) Lycoming O435-A engine, an increased gross weight of 2,600 lbs, hydraulically operated landing gear and flaps, and a deluxe interior. 99 of these airplanes were produced between 1949 and 1951. Externally, a near-look-alike to the earlier models, this version was distinguished by its larger, oval-shaped endplates. All production ceased in 1956 as Bellanca wound up its operations.

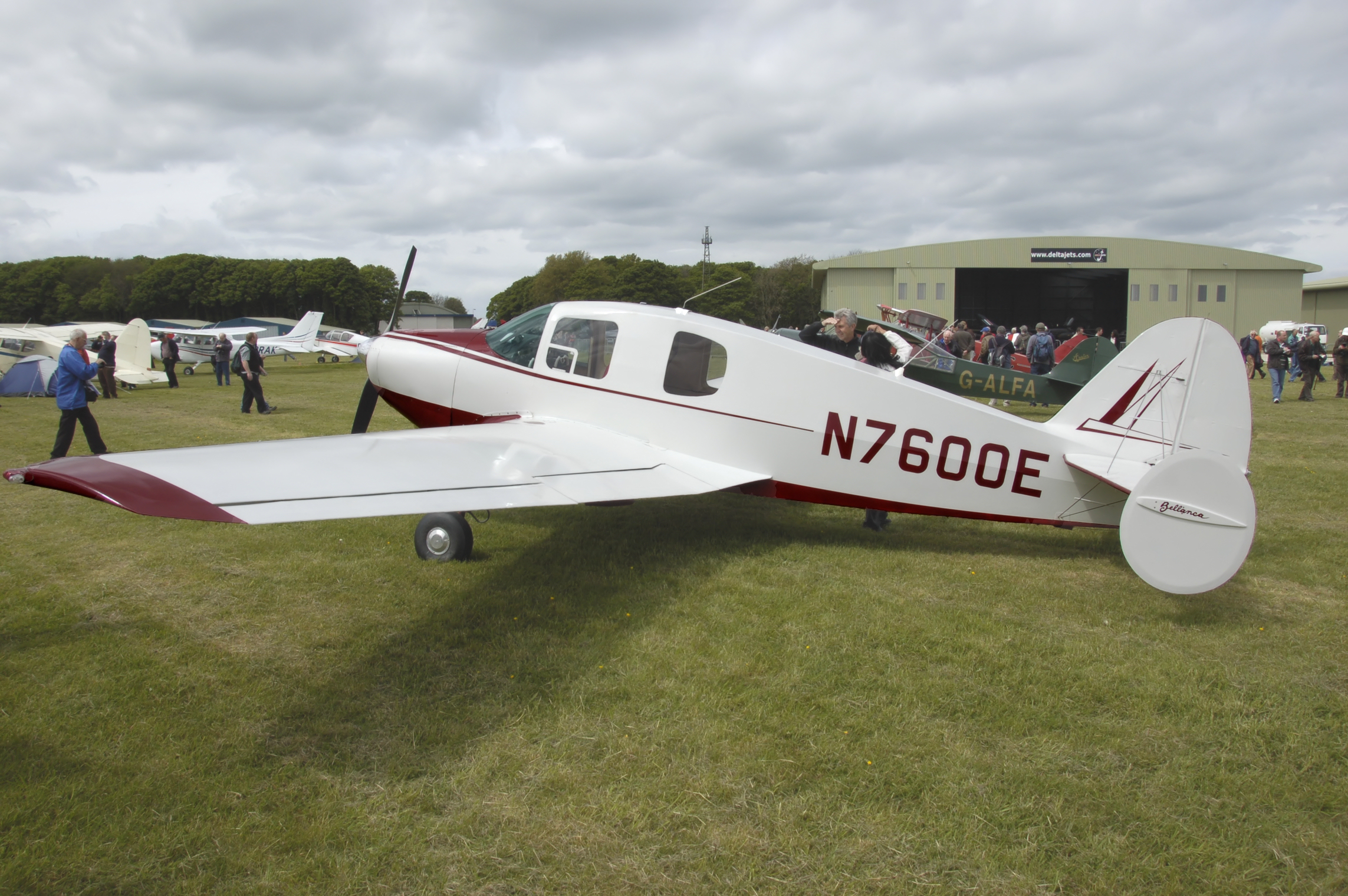
Bellanca 14-19-2 Cruisemaster, built 1958

=== Model 14-19-2 ===
The 14-19 design was revived by Northern Aircraft and granted FAA approval on January 7, 1957 as the 14-19-2 Cruisemaster. The new model featured a 230 hp (172 kW) Continental O-470K engine, an increased gross weight of 2,700 pounds, an updated instrument panel as well as new paint and upholstery schemes. 104 of these airplanes were produced between 1957 and 1958.

The company was renamed Downer Aircraft in 1959. Inter-Air acquired the production rights in 1962 and was renamed as the Bellanca Sales Company, a subsidiary of Miller Flying Service. Further development of the design by Inter-Air resulted in the modernized Viking series introduced in 1962.

1946 model Bellanca 14-13 Cruisair Senior at the Western Canada Aviation Museum- note the large endplates of the initial 14-13

=== Bellanca Viking ===
The Bellanca Viking and Super Viking were developed through modifications of the 'Cruisair' designs by the aviation pioneer Giuseppe Bellanca. Derived directly from the Cruisair, the Viking introduced a swept single tail of similar area, replacing the triple-tail of earlier aircraft, initially manufactured by Downer Aircraft as the Model 260 starting around 1958. The Viking model was born out of discussions at Downer for a bigger version of the "Model 260" with at least 300 horsepower. The Minnesota based company employed skilled craftsman who manufactured the wing from spruce and the new 300 hp model was named the "Viking" in respect to the many Scandinavians of the area.

The first Model 17 Viking appeared in 1967 called the "17-30" it was powered by a 300 hp Continental IO-520-K. In 1969 a Viking powered by a 290 hp (later 300 hp) Lycoming IO-540 was introduced, either normally aspirated (17-31) or turbocharged (17-31TC).

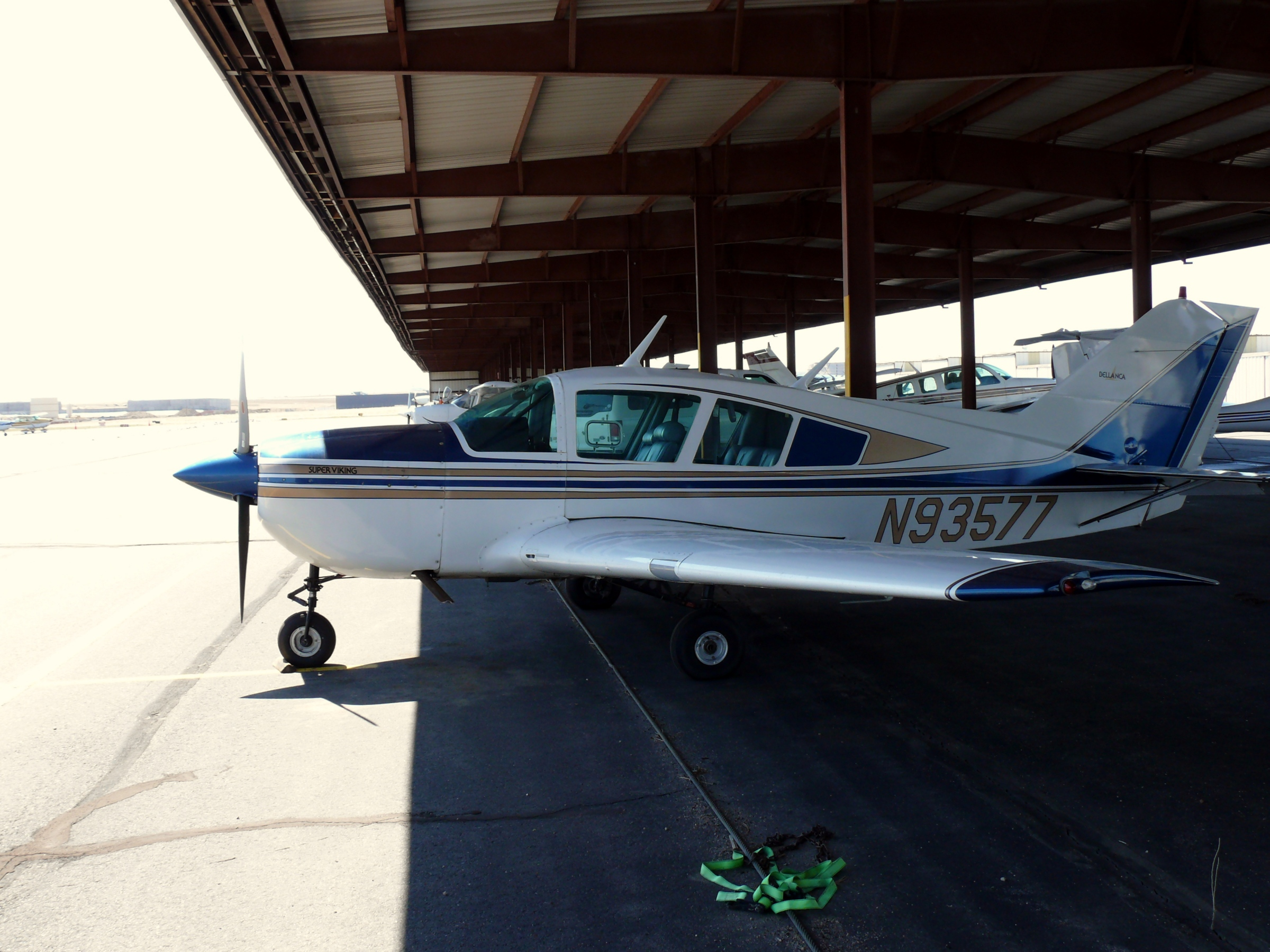
Bellanca Super Viking photographed at Centennial Airport

Over the years there were a number of refinements in the aircraft. The original hydraulic gear and flap actuation system was redesigned in 1968 introducing electric flaps. In 1969 the FAA issued Type Certificate A18CE and the aircraft built under that design were designated the "A" series "Super Vikings". Aside from refinements already made to late Viking 300 models, the new 300A Vikings (17-30A, 17-31A and 17-31ATC) had a gross weight increase to 3,325 lbs. The original complex fuel system with five tanks and two fuel selectors allowing eight possible combinations of selector settings was simplified to a left, right and auxiliary system in 1974. In 1979 the Continental powered Vikings sported a fully enclosed nosewheel thanks to a redesign of the engine mount. This necessitated the use of cowl flaps for the first time on the Viking but resulted in a 12 mph increase. In 1979 production of the Lycoming powered 17-31A ceased. In 1996, the Continental IO-550 was made available as an option.

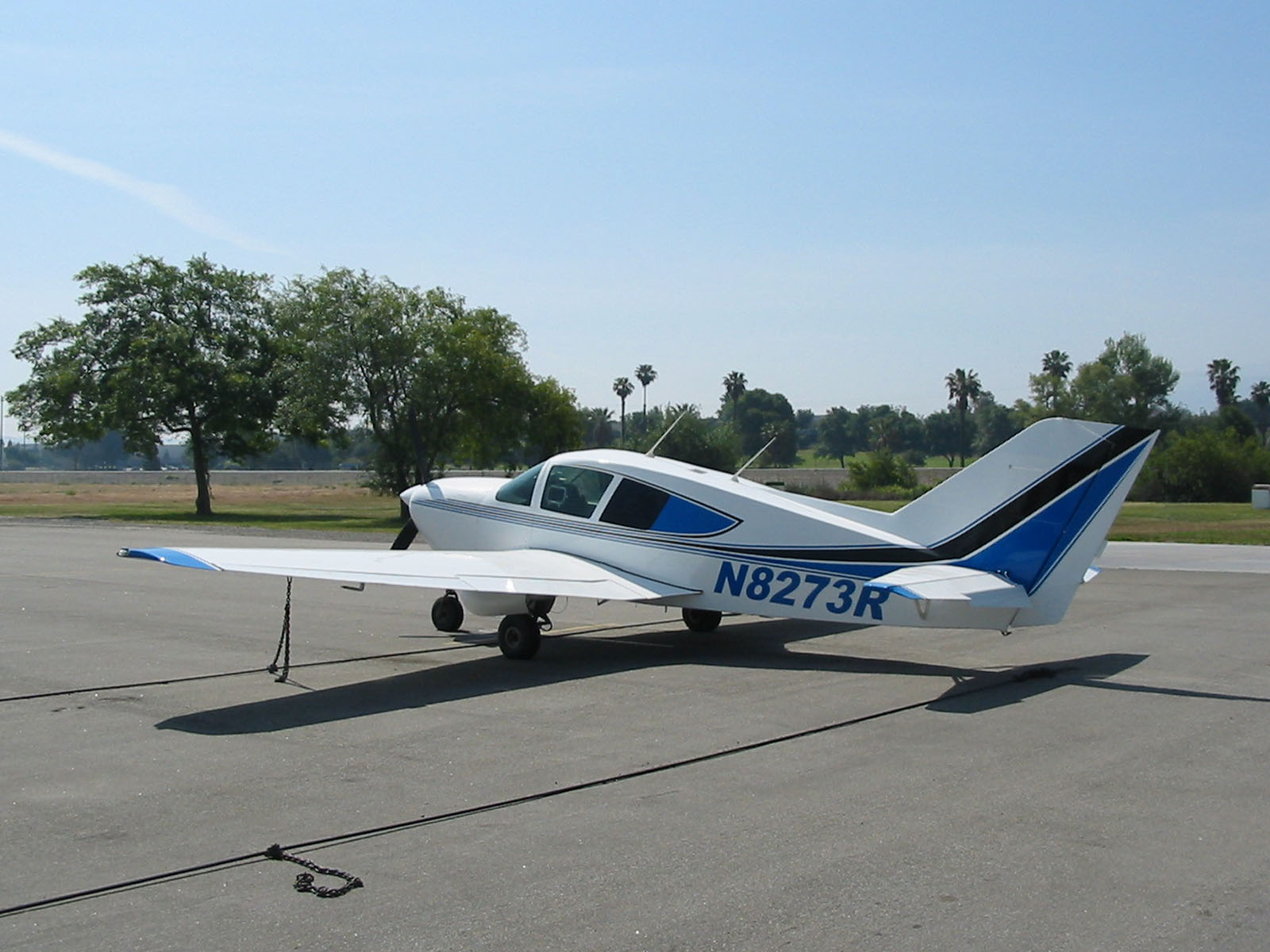
Viking

== Operational history ==
Designed and produced in the post-World War II era, the Bellanca 14-13 Cruisair Senior was aimed at a general aviation market. Pilot/owners were offered a combination of performance, low engine power and a modest price of $4500. Its performance and structural strength also made it attractive for utility work, but in many ways the Bellanca design was an anachronism, relying on a conventional landing gear configuration and wood and fabric construction that harkened back to an earlier age. Postwar economics along with a glut of surplus military aircraft precluded heavy sales although about 600 were produced.

Despite its introduction into a period where private aircraft sales were stagnant, the aircraft remained popular through all of its incarnations and today is considered a classic cabin monoplane and is much in demand.

Since 2002 the company has been operated by a group of six Bellanca enthusiasts who bought the company from the state of Minnesota and established Alexandria Aircraft Co. LLC, providing technical support and parts for owners and maintenance organisations in the field. New aircraft have been available from Alexandria Aircraft Co., who have sold one new aircraft manufactured in 2005.

== Variants ==
Junior 14-7
Prototype with fixed undercarriage and LeBlond 5E radial piston engine.

14-7L - 14-7 with Lenape LM-5 engine.

14-9
Main production version with retractable undercarriage and Ken-Royce 5F radial piston engine.

14-9L - Fitted with a Lenape Brave engine.

14-10L - fitted with a 100 hp (75 kW) Lycoming engine.

14-12 - with Franklin 6AC engine

14-13
Initial model introduced in 1946, type approved September 25, 1946.

14-13-2 - Improved model introduced in 1947. Featured a longer span stabilizer with smaller endplates and an external baggage door, type approved June 2, 1947.
14-13-3 - Improved model introduced in 1948, type approved October 25, 1948, which remained in production until 1956
14-13W - Wagon version with plywood-lined cabin and removable rear seats.

T14-14
Militarized trainer version (single prototype only).

14-19
190 hp (142 kW) version introduced in 1949

14-19-2 - 230 hp (172 kW) version introduced in 1957
14-19-3 - 260 hp (194 kW) tricycle gear version introduced in 1959 by Downer Aircraft

Downer 260
14-19-3 production by Downer Aircraft Industries Inc.

Miller 260A
Further production of the 14-19 by Miller Flying Service, which had acquired the rights for manufacture from International Aircraft Mfg Inc. (Inter-Air)

Aviabellanca 260C
Model 14-19-3C version built in the late 1960s by Inter-Air with revised empennage and 260 hp (194 kW) Continental IO-470-F engine

17-30 Viking 300
Four-seat light cabin aircraft, powered by a 224-kW (300-hp) Continental IO-520-K piston engine.

17-30A Super Viking 300A: Four-seat light cabin aircraft, powered by a 224-kW (300-hp) Continental IO-520-K piston engine.
17-31 Viking 300: Four-seat light cabin aircraft, powered by a 224-kW (300-hp) Lycoming IO-540 piston engine.
17-31A Super Viking 300A: Four-seat light cabin aircraft, powered by a 224-kW (300-hp) Lycoming IO-540-K1ES piston engine.
17-31ATC Super Viking 300A: Four-seat light cabin aircraft, powered by a 224-kW (300-hp) Lycoming IO-540-K1ES piston engine, the aircraft is fitted with two Rajay turbochargers.
17-31TC Viking 300: Four-seat light cabin aircraft, powered by a 224-kW (300-hp) Lycoming IO-540 piston engine, the aircraft is fitted with turbocharger.

== Specifications (14-13-3) ==
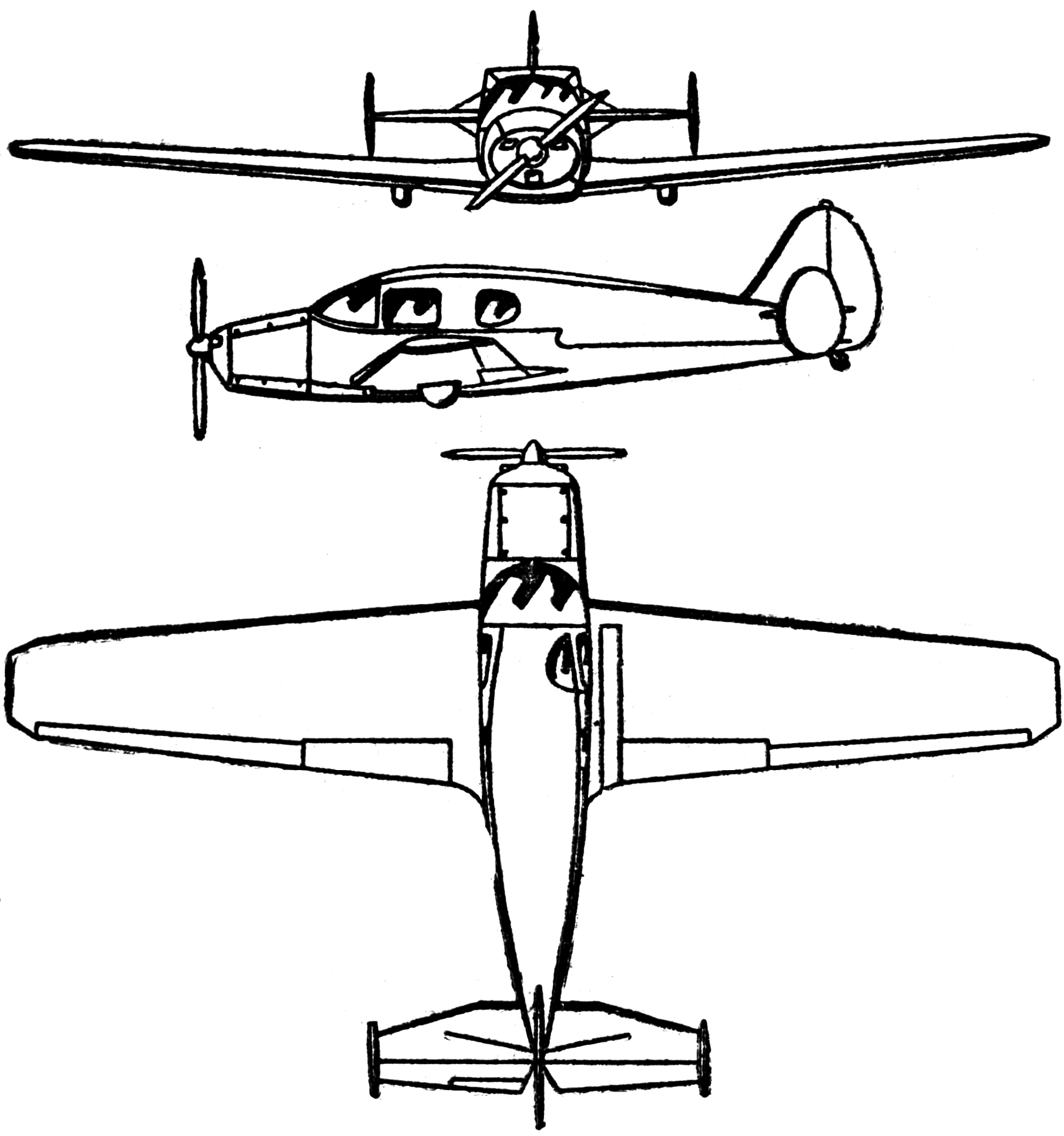
Bellanca Cruisair Senior 3-view drawing from Les Ailes February 15, 1947

Data from Jane's All the World's Aircraft 1951/52

General characteristics

- Crew: one pilot
- Capacity: 3 passengers
- Length: 21 ft 3 11/16 in (6.49 m) (tail up)
- Wingspan: 34 ft 2 in (10.41 m)
- Height: 6 ft 2 1/2 in (1.89 m) (tail down)
- Wing area: 161 sq ft (15.0 m^{2})
- Airfoil: Bellanca "B"
- Empty weight: 1,250 lb (567 kg)
- Gross weight: 2,150 lb (975 kg)
- Fuel capacity: 40 US gal (33 imp gal; 150 L)
- Powerplant: 1 × Franklin 6A4-335-B3 air-cooled flat-six engine, 150 hp (110 kW)

Performance

- Cruise speed: 165 mph (266 km/h, 143 kn) at 6,500 ft (2,000 m)
- Service ceiling: 22,000 ft (6,700 m)
- Take-off run: 506 ft (154 m)
- Landing run: 437 ft (133 m)

== See also ==
- Giuseppe Mario Bellanca
