= Bellanca Junior =

Bellanca Junior may refer to a number of different Bellanca aircraft:

- Various members of the Bellanca 14-7 family named Junior or Cruisair Junior
- The Bellanca 77-320 bomber seaplane
