= Bellanca 77-140 =

American bomber aircraft

77-140 Bomber
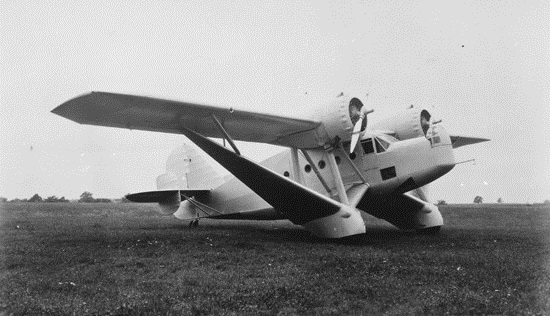

General information
- Type: Light Bomber
- Manufacturer: Bellanca
- Primary user: Colombian Air Force

History
- First flight: 1934

The Bellanca 77-140 Bomber was a bomber aircraft built in small numbers in the United States in the 1930s. It was a derivative of Bellanca's successful Aircruiser civil transport in which the Aircruiser's single, nose-mounted engine was replaced by twin engines on the upper wing. The United States military were not interested in the type, but the Colombian Air Force bought a small number, including a float-equipped version dubbed the 77-320 Junior. This version also differed from the landplane in having a fully enclosed nose turret in place of the open turret of the 77-140.

== Specifications (77-140) ==
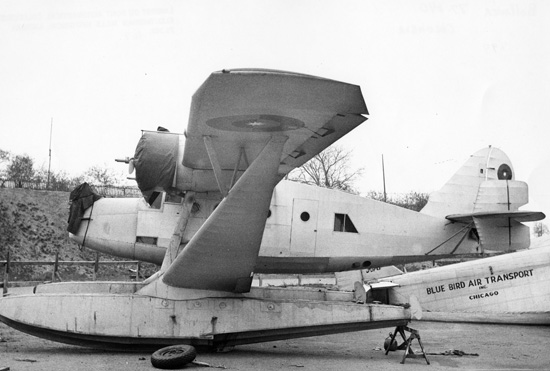
77-320 floatplane of the Colombian Air Force

General characteristics

- Crew: two, pilot and gunner
- Length: 40 ft 0 in (12.20 m)
- Wingspan: 77 ft 0 in (23.48 m)
- Height: 14 ft 0 in (4.26 m)
- Wing area: 129 sq ft (12.0 m^{2})
- Gross weight: 12,250 lb (5,560 kg)
- Powerplant: 2 × Wright R-1820 , 650 hp (485 kW) each

Performance

- Maximum speed: 180 mph (290 km/h, 160 kn)
- Range: 700 mi (1,120 km, 610 nmi)
- Service ceiling: 20,000 ft (6,100 m)

Armament

- 2 × .30 caliber machine guns
- 2,200 lb (1,000 kg) of bombs

== Users ==
Colombia

- Colombian Air Force
