= Froebe helicopter =

The Froebe Helicopter was the first helicopter to be built and flown in Canada. It was built by brothers Doug, Theodore and Nicholas Froebe in the 1930s.

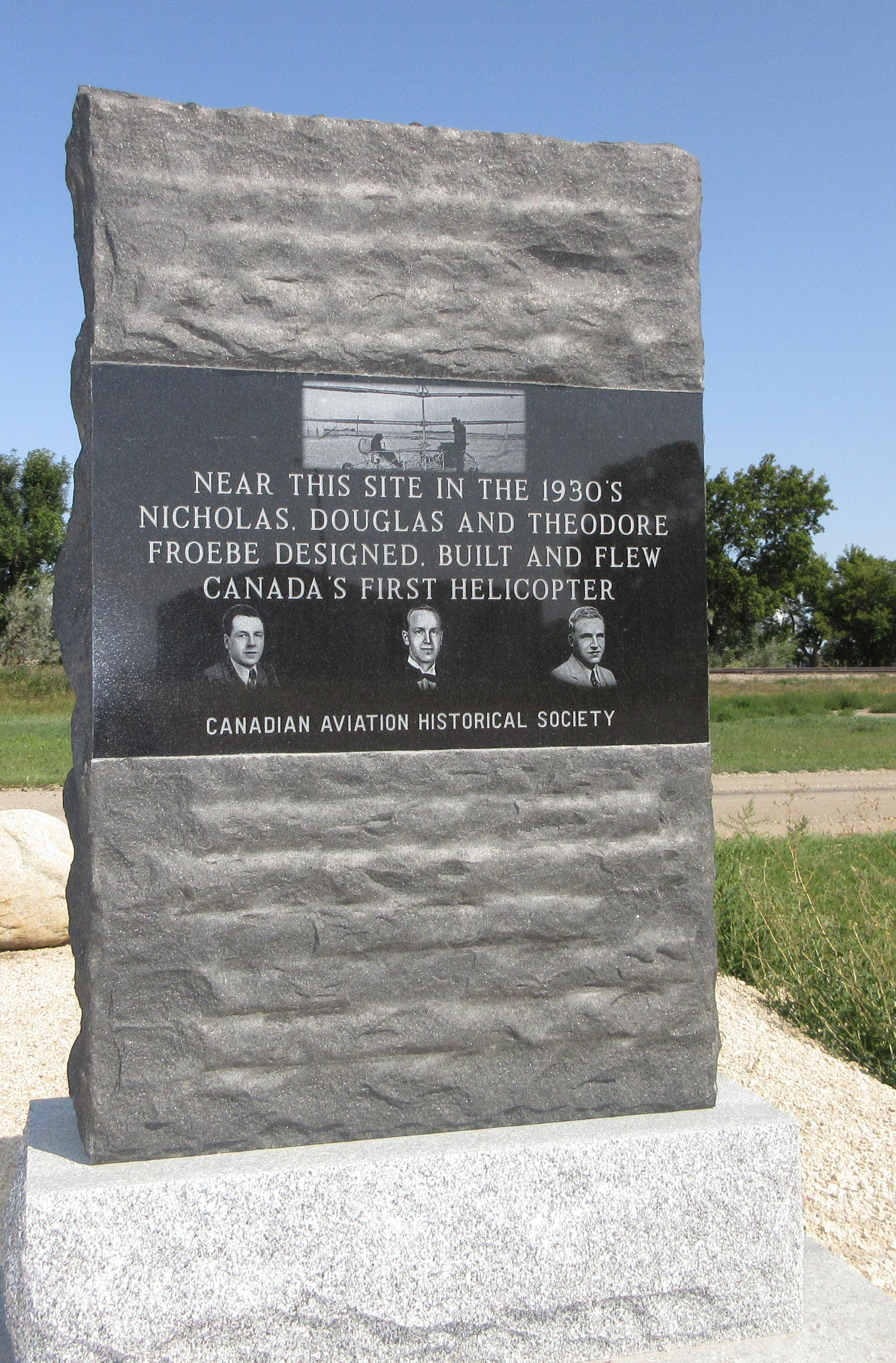
Marker near Homewood, Manitoba

The machine was constructed on a custom-made steel tubular frame using spare parts and equipment from automobiles, farm machinery and elsewhere. Fitted with a de Havilland Gipsy aero engine, it had twin concentric contra-rotating rotors of stainless steel tubing with fabric covering and with full cyclic and collective pitch control.

The 98 hp available from the engine proved inadequate, but several test flights were made, the machine showing severe vibration. Work was then interrupted by the outbreak of the Second World War.

The helicopter was stored in a granary and forgotten. A later generation of the Froebe family rediscovered it and donated it to the Royal Aviation Museum of Western Canada.

== Development ==
The Froebe family moved from Chatsworth, Illinois to the Homewood area in 1921. In 1927, the Froebe brothers (Nicolas, Theodore and Douglas) purchased and assembled a Heath Parasol fixed-wing aircraft kit and learned to fly. They later purchased and restored another fixed-wing aircraft and flew it until 1933, when it was damaged. In the winter of 1936–1937, the brothers traveled to Oakland, California to learn about rotary-wing aircraft and commenced construction of their own helicopter in 1937. The first short test flight was carried out on December 20, 1938. Vibration problems and bearing failures occurred after only a few more hours of test flights of up to five feet in altitude and 50 feet distance, so experiments were discontinued in early 1939.

Theodore Froebe was killed in the crash of a Heath Parasol in 1943, and Nicolas died in 1959 while crop dusting. Douglas Froebe moved to California, but returned to Homewood to carry out experiments with another novel aircraft design.

== Specifications ==
- Rotor span: 8.53 m (28 ft 0 in) (two coaxial counter-rotating rotors)
- Length: 4.14 m (13 ft 7 in)
- Engine: de Havilland Gipsy 98 hp 4-cylinder in-line, air-cooled aero engine
