= AviaBellanca Aircraft =

American aircraft design and manufacturing company

AviaBellanca Aircraft Corporation
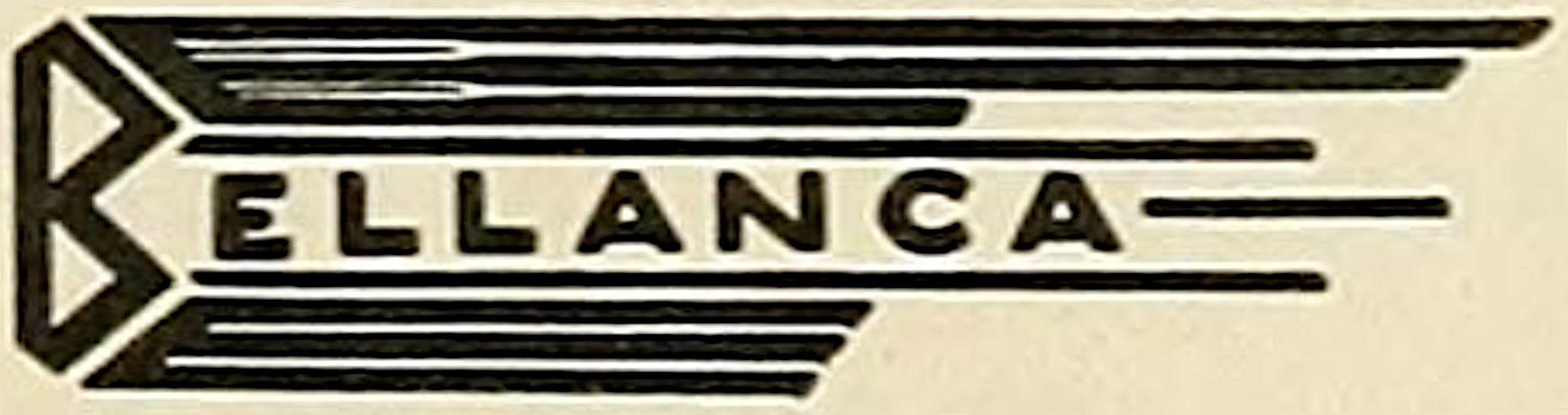

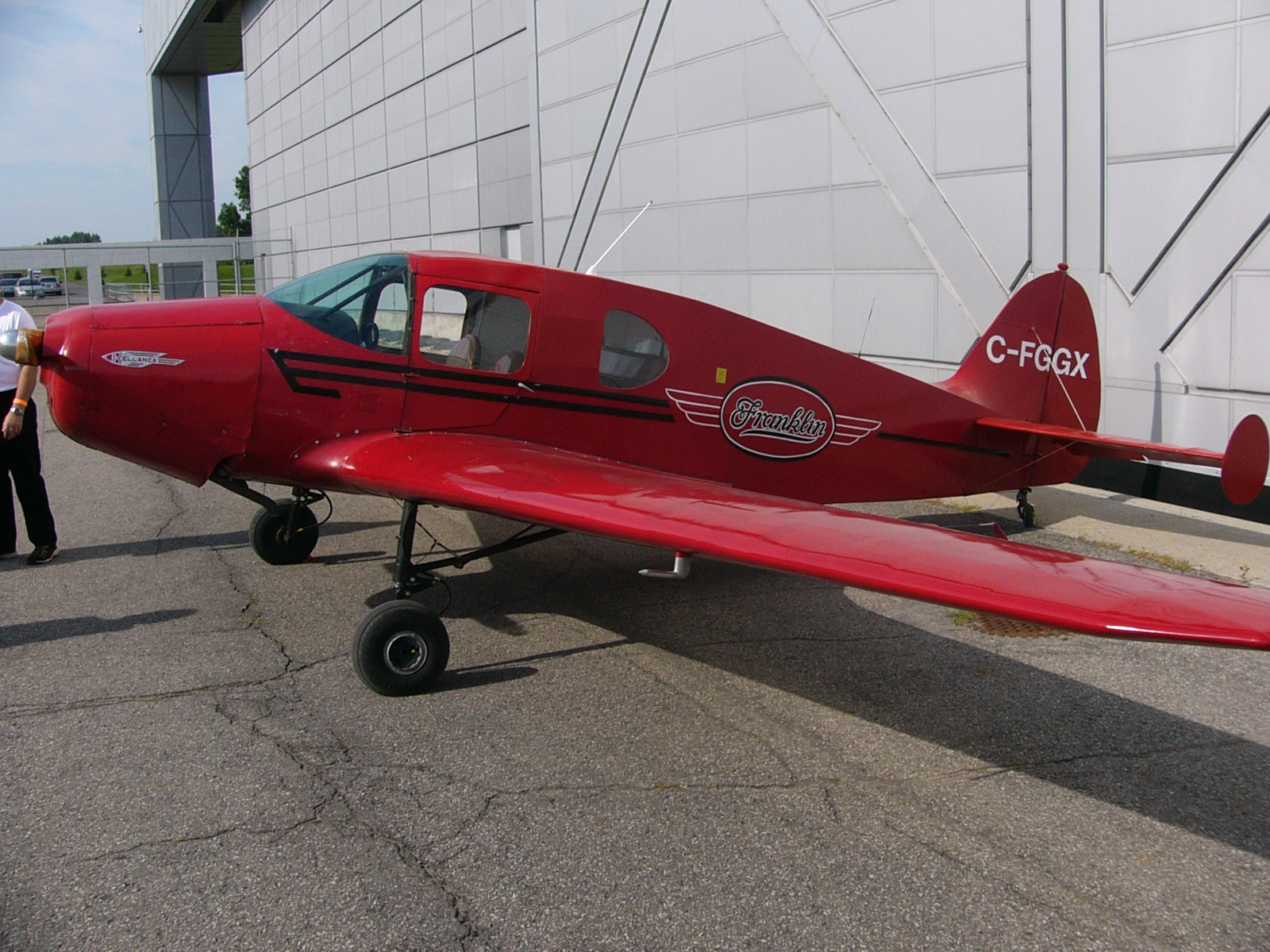
- Bellanca 14-13-2
- Formerly: Bellanca Aircraft Company
- Industry: Aerospace
- Founded: 1927; 99 years ago
- Founders: Giuseppe Mario Bellanca
- Headquarters: San Luis Obispo, CA
- Website: bellancaaircraft.com

AviaBellanca Aircraft Corporation was an American aircraft design and manufacturing company. Prior to 1983, it was known as the Bellanca Aircraft Company. The company was founded in 1927 by Giuseppe Mario Bellanca, although it was preceded by previous businesses and partnerships in which aircraft with the Bellanca name were produced, including Wright-Bellanca, in which he was in partnership with Wright Aeronautical.

In 2021 the company was reformed as Bellanca Aircraft, Inc and located in San Luis Obispo, California, with a satellite maintenance facility in Oklahoma. The new company supplies maintenance and aircraft parts, for the legacy Cruisemaster and Viking aircraft.

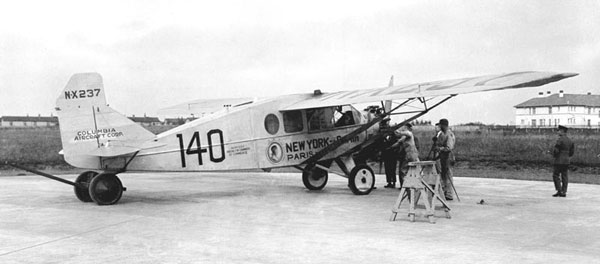
Bellanca WB-2 "Columbia"

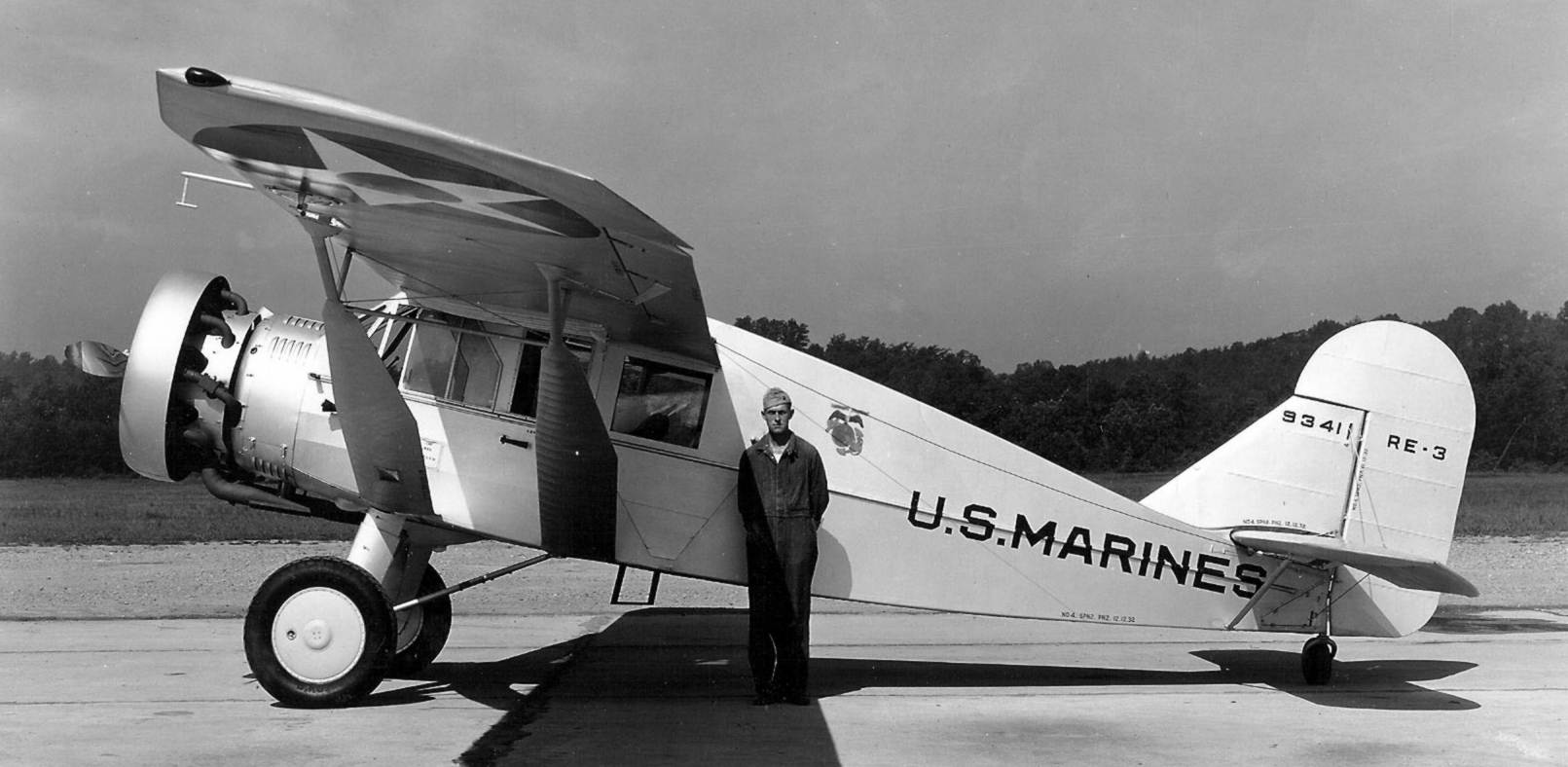
Bellanca CH-400 Skyrocket/XRE-3

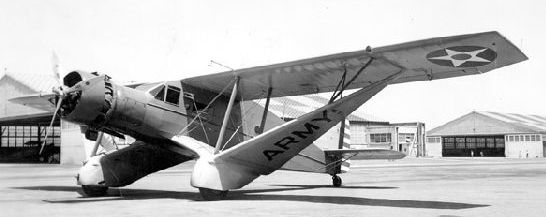
Bellanca C-27C Airbus

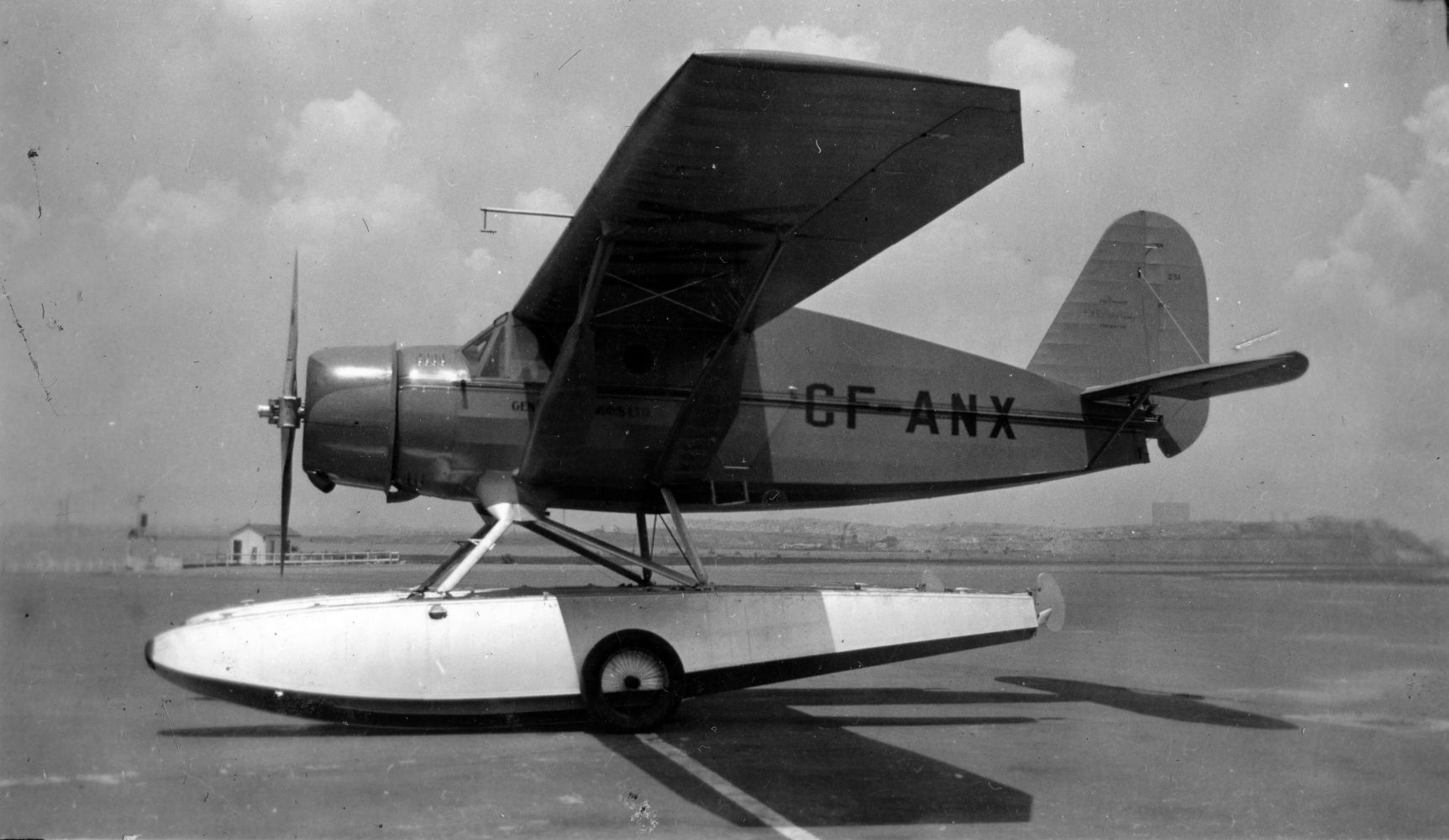
Bellanca 31-42 Senior Pacemaker

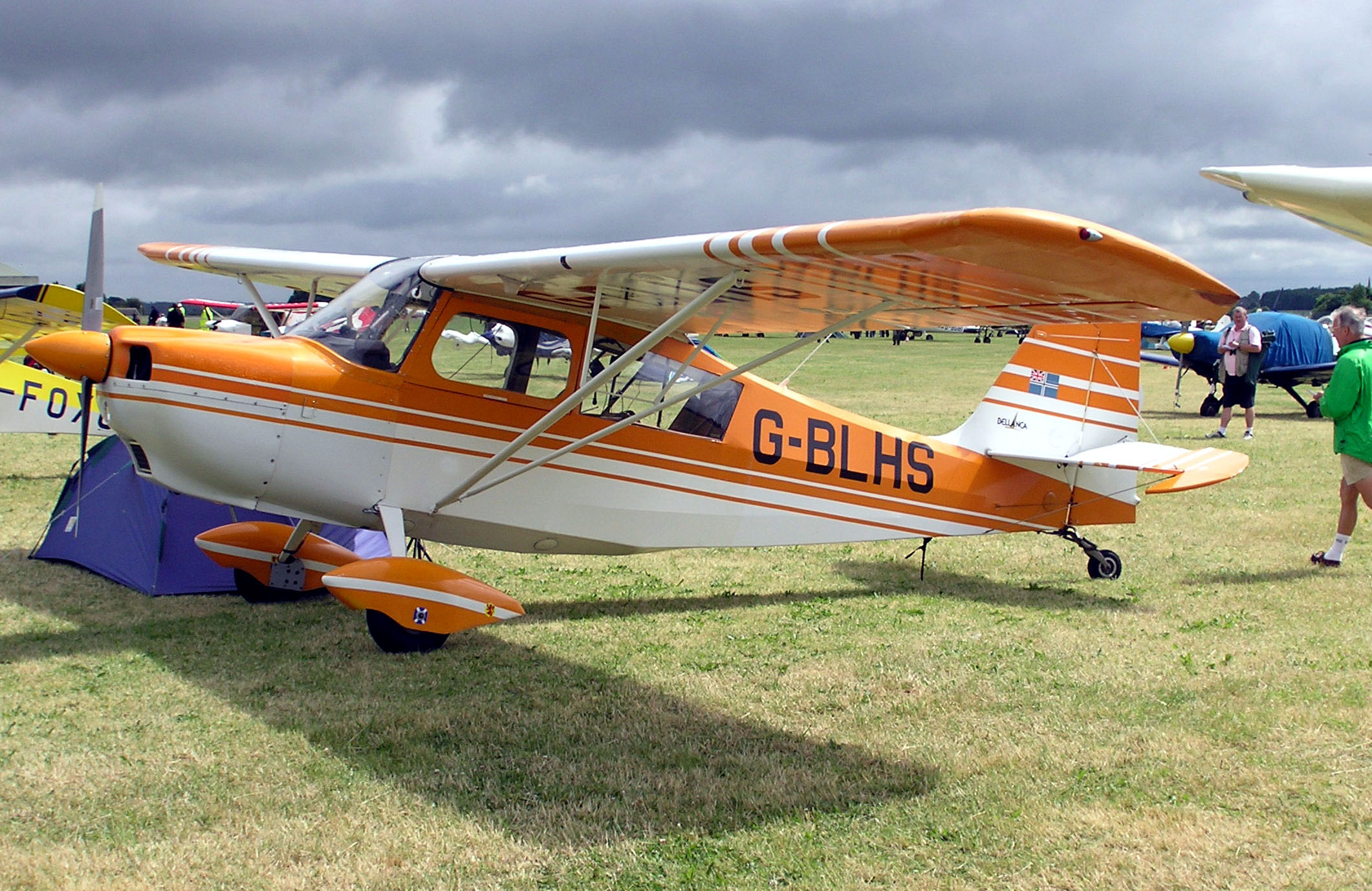
Bellanca Citabria 7ECA

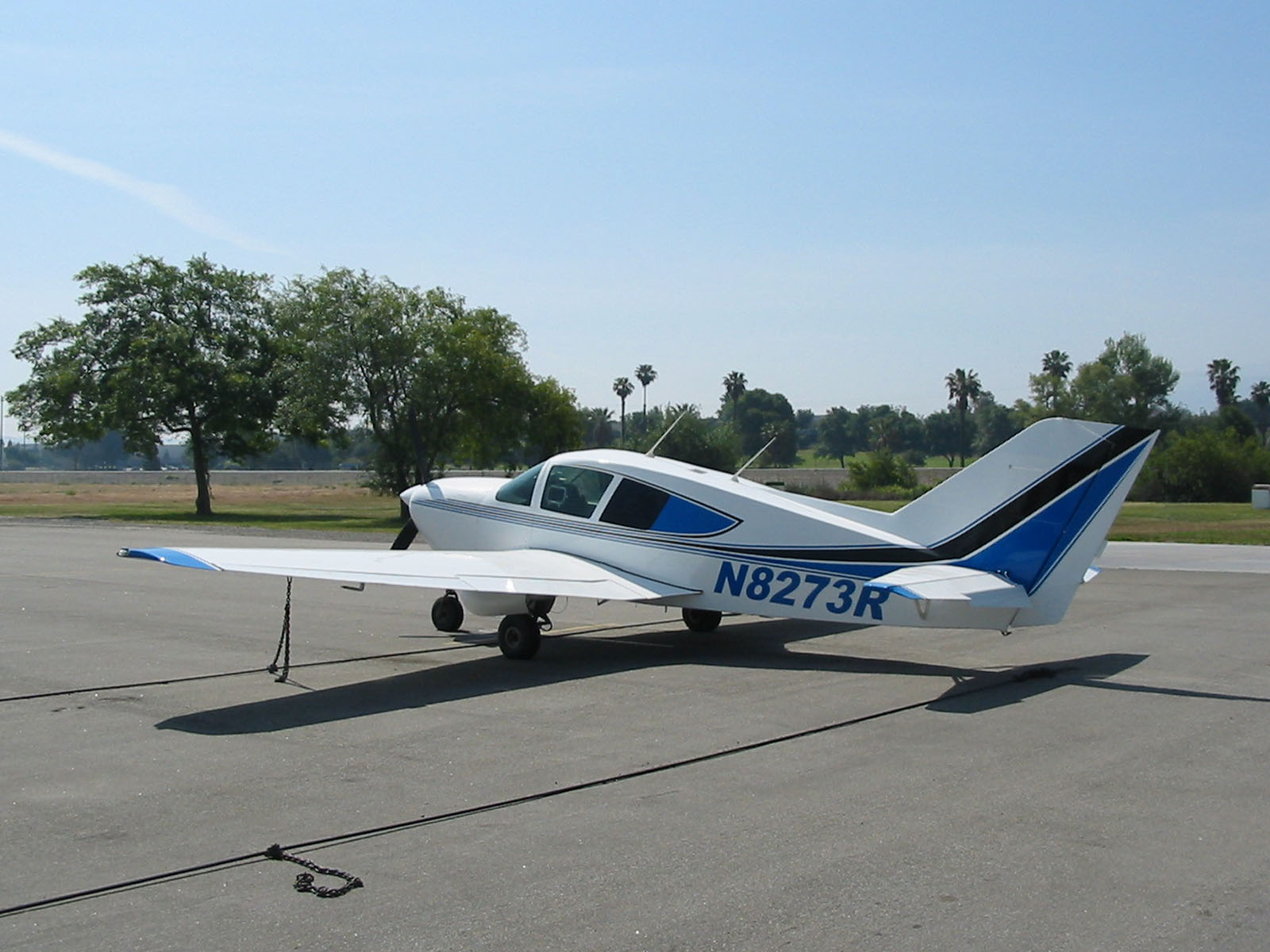
Bellanca 17-30A Super Viking

== History ==
After Giuseppe Mario Bellanca, the designer and builder of Italy's first aircraft, moved to the United States in 1911, he began to design aircraft for a number of firms, including the Maryland Pressed Steel Company, Wright Aeronautical Corporation and the Columbia Aircraft Corporation. Bellanca founded his own company, Bellanca Aircraft Corporation of America, in 1927, sited first in Richmond Hill, New York and moving in 1928 to New Castle (Wilmington), Delaware. In the 1920s and 1930s, Bellanca's aircraft of his own design were known for their efficiency and low operating cost, gaining fame for world record endurance and distance flights. Lindbergh's first choice for his New York to Paris flight was a Bellanca WB-2. The company's insistence on selecting the crew drove Lindbergh to Ryan.

Bellanca remained president and chairman of the board from the corporation's inception on the last day of 1927 until he sold the company to L. Albert and Sons in 1954. From that time on, the Bellanca line was part of a succession of companies that maintained the lineage of the original aircraft produced by Bellanca.

In 2022, the company moved from Alexandria, Minnesota to Sulphur, Oklahoma. While as of 2024 the company website states "Bellanca recently opened a new aircraft factory and maintenance facility in Sulphur, Oklahoma," no new aircraft have been recently produced.

== Aircraft ==
Model name	First flight	No. built	Type
Wright-Bellanca WB-1	1925	1	Single engine cabin monoplane
Wright-Bellanca WB-2	1926	1	Single engine cabin monoplane
CH-200 Pacemaker	1928	2	Single engine cabin monoplane
Model K	1928	1	Single engine transport monoplane
Model P series, C-27 Airbus	1928	25-30	Single engine transport monoplane
Model J	1929	4	Single engine cabin monoplane
CH-300 Pacemaker	1929	~35	Single engine cabin monoplane
TES Tandem Blue Streak	1929	1	Twin-engine endurance record sesquiplane
CH-400 Skyrocket	1930	32	Single engine cabin monoplane
66-67 Aircruiser family	1930	23	Single engine utility monoplane
J-300/J-3-500	1931	5	Single engine endurance monoplane
XSE-1 & XSE-2	1932	1	Single engine carrier scout monoplane
Model D Skyrocket/XRE-3	1932	7	Single engine utility monoplane
Model E Pacemaker	1932	7	Single engine utility monoplane
Model F-1, F-2 Skyrocket	1933	2	Single engine utility monoplane
28-70 Irish Swoop	1934	1	Single engine MacRobertson Air Race monoplane
Model F Skyrocket	1934	3	Single engine utility monoplane
77-140	1934	1	Twin engine bomber
77-320 Junior	1934	4	Twin engine bomber
31-40 Senior Pacemaker family	1935	10	Single engine cabin monoplane
31-50 Senior Skyrocket family	1935	10~	Single engine cabin monoplane
XSOE-1	1936	1	Single engine scout biplane floatplane
28-90 Flash	1937	43	Single engine military monoplane
14-7 Cruisair Junior	1937	1	Single engine cabin monoplane
17-20 (Note: The June 1, 1937 edition of Aviation (today, Aviation Week & Space Technology) describes the Bellanca 17-20 as a five-place, low wing monoplane designed for the medium-priced private market, and notes that the fuselage will have a stressed-skin, monocoque structure without compound curves. The short note also quotes an unidentified source to say that the aircraft will be powered by a "well-known American inline motor", which the anonymous Aviation writer assumes to be a Menasco. The 1937 edition of Jane's All the World's Aircraft adds nothing more than this, simply noting that "Only very brief details were available at the time of going to press". The 1938 edition no longer mentions it in its list of current Bellanca designs, and Jane's Encyclopedia of Aviation, published in 1980 and revised in 1989 and 1993 adds nothing more than was announced in Aviation in 1937.)	1937		monoplane
28-92	1938	1	Trimotor racing monoplane
14-9 Cruisair	1939	44	Single engine cabin monoplane
14-14/T14-14	1940	1	Trainer based on Cruisair
YO-50	1940	3	Prototype single engine observation monoplane
14-13 Cruisair Senior	1945	~600	Single engine cabin monoplane
14-19 Cruisemaster	1949	203	Single engine cabin monoplane
Citabria	1964		Single engine cabin monoplane
17-30 Viking	1967	1,356	Single engine cabin monoplane
Decathlon	1970		Single engine cabin monoplane
Champ	1946	10,000+	Single engine cabin monoplane
T-250 Aries	1973	5	Single engine cabin monoplane
Scout	1974	500+	Single engine cabin monoplane
19-25 Skyrocket II	1975	1	Single engine cabin monoplane

== Famous individual aircraft ==
- Lituanica
- Miss Veedol
- The American Nurse

== See also ==
- American Champion
- Bellanca Airfield
- Bush plane
