= Royal Aviation Museum of Western Canada =

- Location within Manitoba
- Former name: Western Canada Aviation Museum (1974–2014)
- Established: 1974; 52 years ago
- Location: Winnipeg, Manitoba
- Coordinates: 49.90125°N 97.22464°W
- Type: Aviation museum
- Founders: Murray Clearwater; Doug Emberley; Gord Emberley; Al Hansen; Keith Olson
- CEO: Peter George
- Public transit access: Winnipeg Transit; D12 D13 224
- Website: royalaviationmuseum.com

The Royal Aviation Museum of Western Canada (formerly the Western Canada Aviation Museum) is an aviation museum in Winnipeg, Manitoba, Canada.

== History ==
The Western Canada Aviation Museum was incorporated in 1974. In November of that year, it put forward an application to the federal government for a grant to set up a 19-acre (7.7 ha) site at St. Andrews Airport. However, the museum ended up in downtown Winnipeg near the Manitoba Museum of Man and Nature. By the next year, the museum had 25 military and civilian aircraft in its collection. In the mid-1980s, the museum moved to a former Trans Canada Air Lines and Transair hangar, T-2, at Winnipeg International Airport.

The museum developed a master plan for a new facility in 2013 with the design firm Reich&Petch.

The museum received the Royal designation on December 19, 2014, to become the Royal Aviation Museum of Western Canada.

The museum closed its Ferry Road site in October 2018 after the lease on the hangar expired. However, following a grant from the federal government in July 2019, construction of a new 8,000-square-metre (86,000 sq ft) museum building began in May 2020. By November that year, construction was more than half complete, and construction of the facility was completed on August 4, 2021.

== Exhibits ==
The museum has a large hangar floor, and a mezzanine with a view of the adjacent Winnipeg James Armstrong Richardson International Airport runways. Aircraft are displayed on the floor and suspended from the ceiling, and include one-of-a-kind aircraft, military jets, bush planes, and commercial aircraft. Exhibits are clustered in zones representing different aspects of aviation history, such as Canadian Innovation, Northern Connections, and Military Skies. Interactive displays such as Experience Flight and the Mechanics Workshop present a hands-on educational experience.

== Collection ==
The museum's collection includes over 90 historic aircraft, 70,000 artifacts, texts, and photographs.

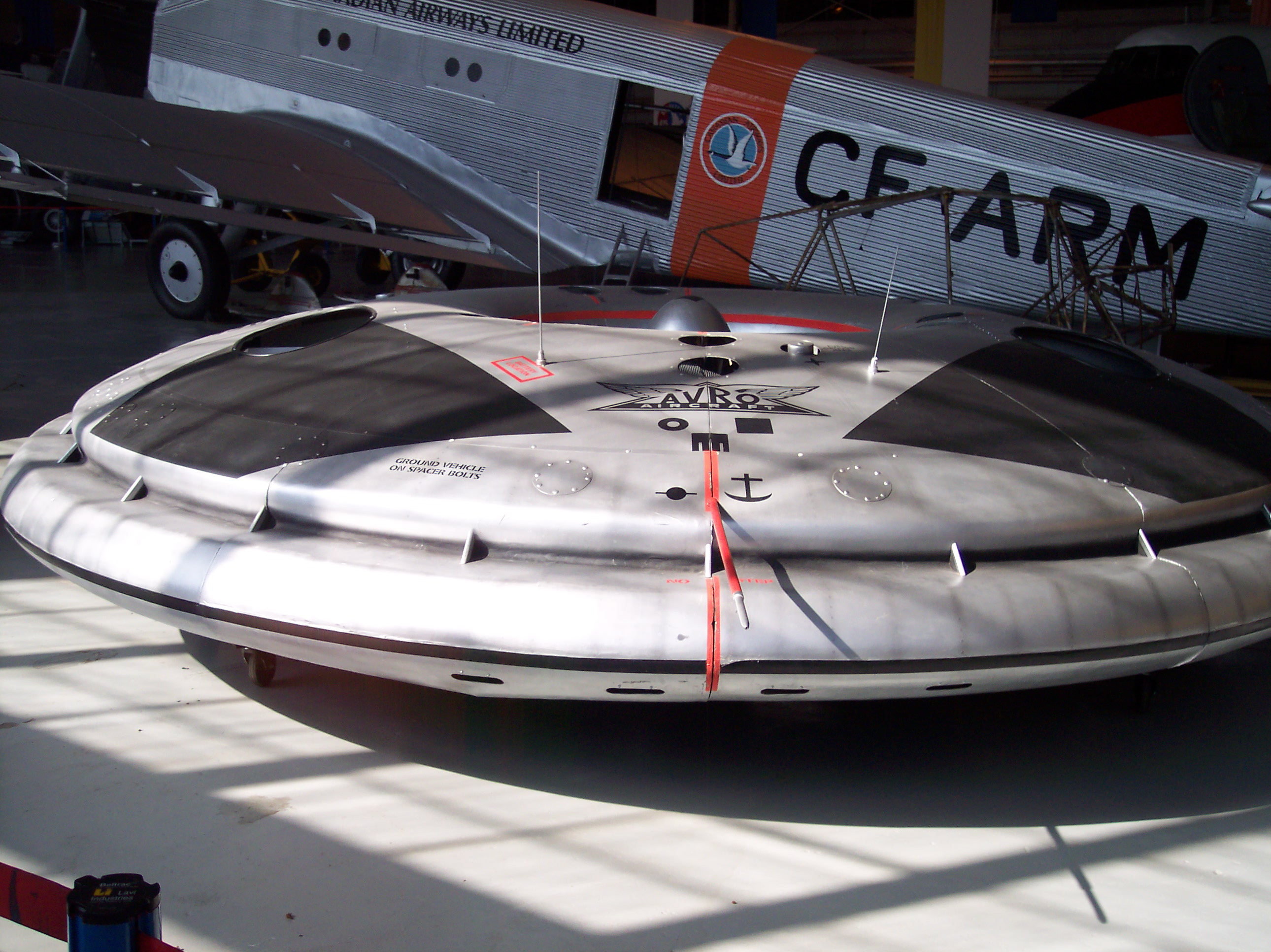
Avrocar model

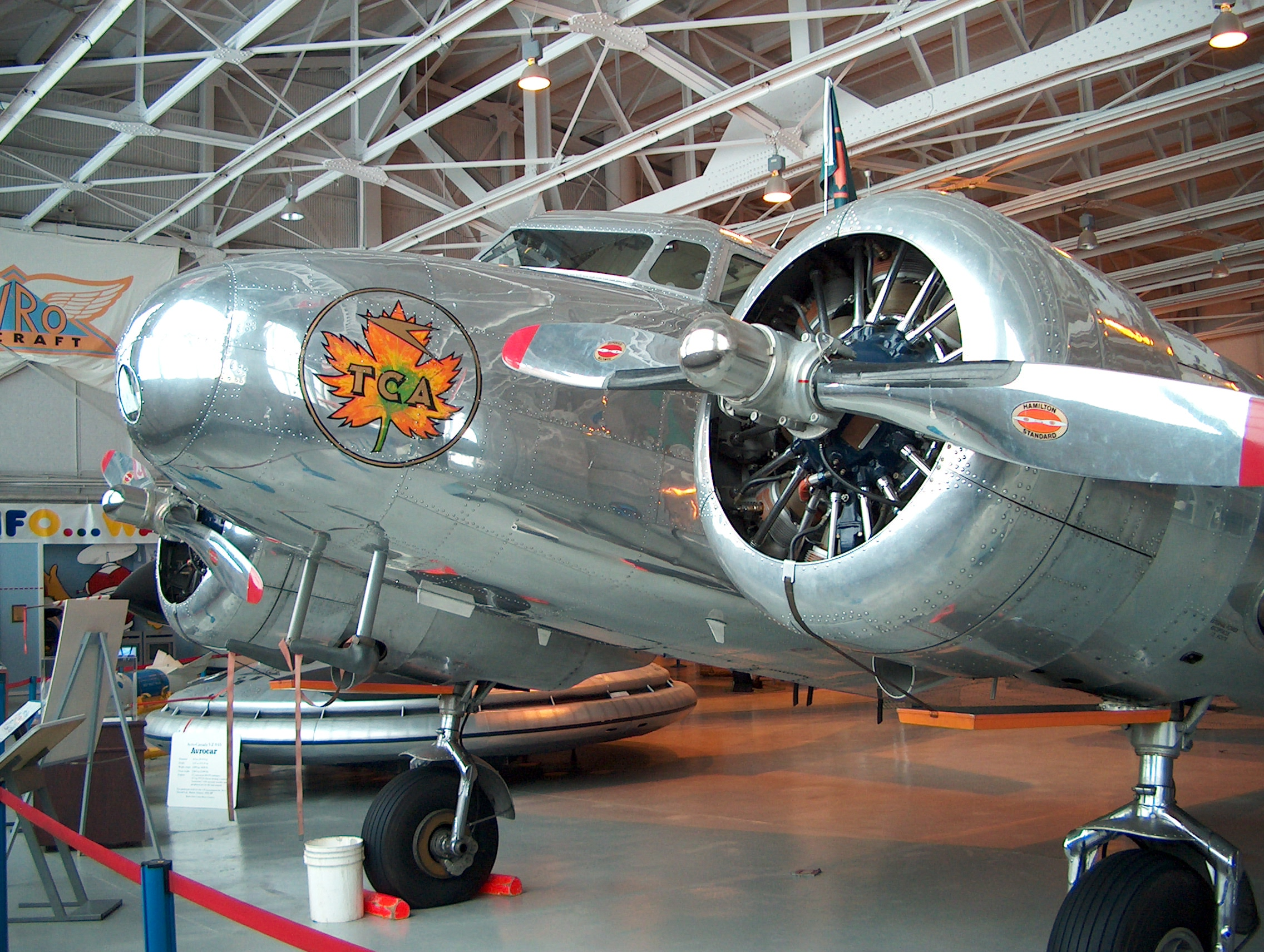
Lockheed Electra 10A "CF-TCC" in Trans-Canada Air Lines livery.

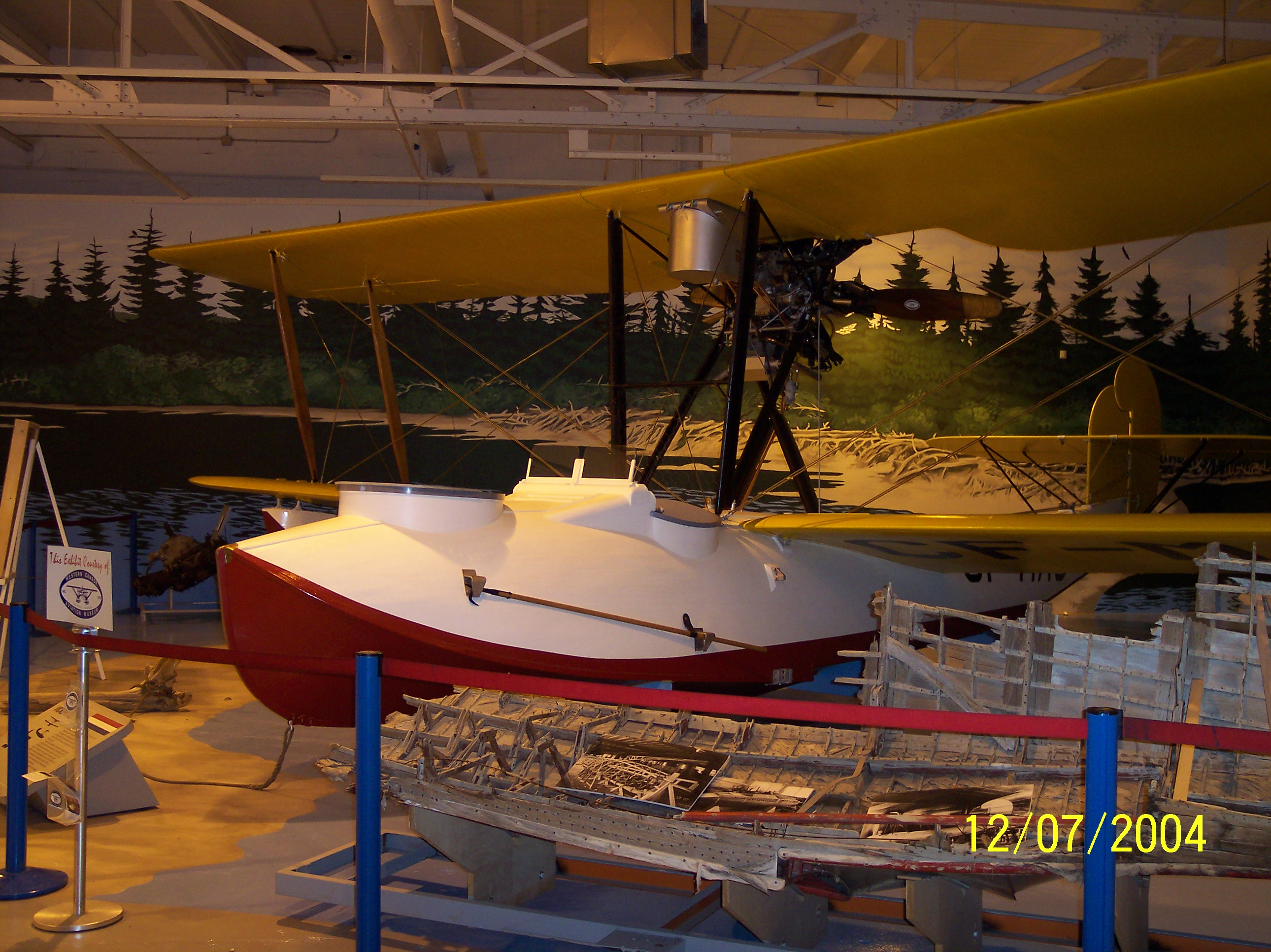
A Vickers Vedette replica

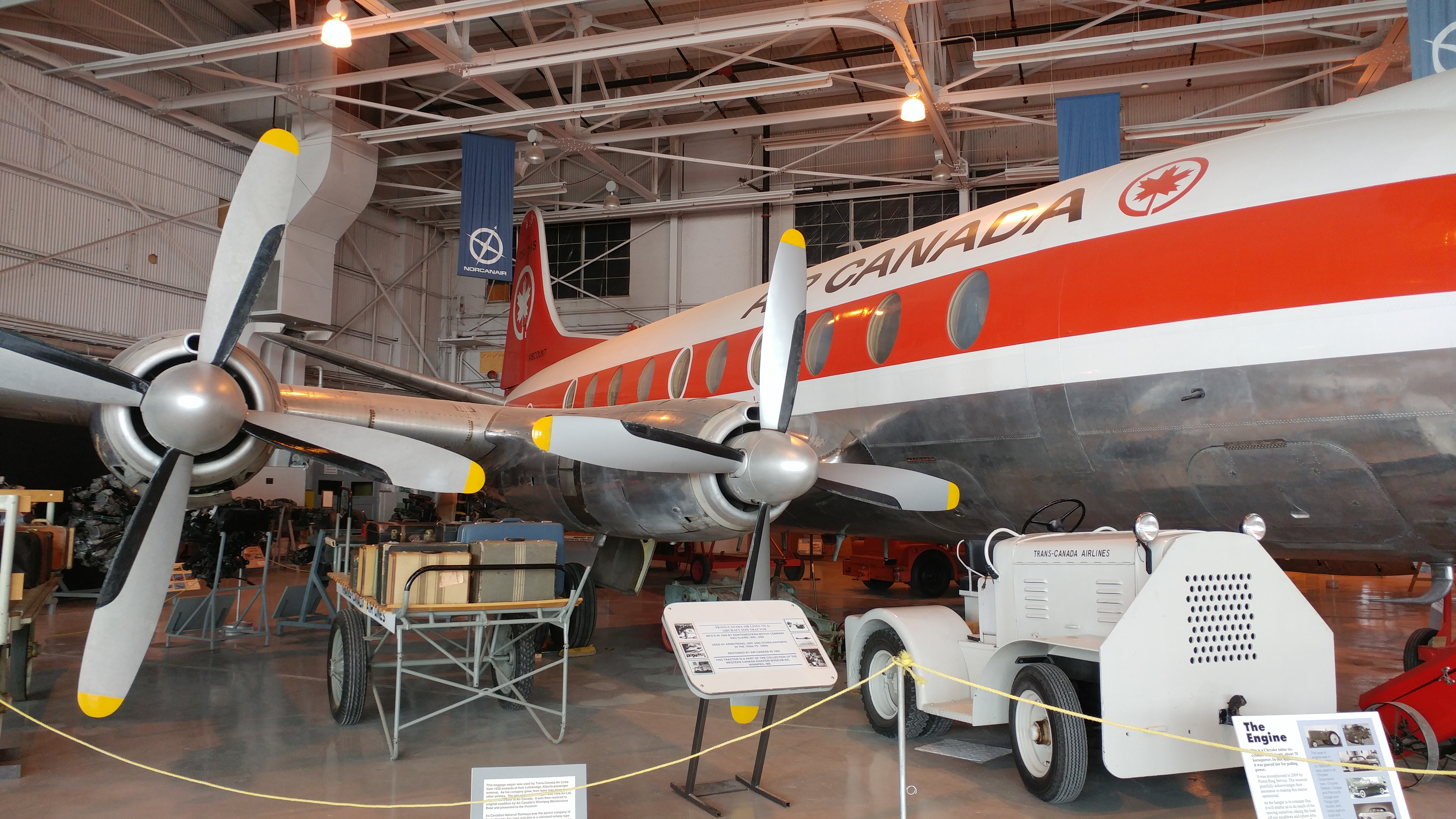
Exterior of the Vickers Viscount

- Auster AOP.6
- Avro CF-100 Canuck 5 18674
- Avrocar – replica
- Beechcraft CT-134 Musketeer 134235
- Beechcraft Expeditor 3N 1477
- Bellanca 14-13 1208
- Bellanca Aircruiser Eldorado Radium Silver Express – under restoration
- Bristol Freighter 31 9699
- Canadair CL-84 CX8403
- Canadair Sabre 6 1815
- Canadair Silver Star 21075
- Canadair CT-114 Tutor 114004
- Canadian Vickers Vedette Composite
- CASA 352L T.2B-148 – converted to resemble Ju 52/1m
- de Havilland Fox Moth Composite
- de Havilland Tiger Moth
- de Havilland Canada DHC-2 Beaver 1500
- Fairchild 71C 516
- Fairchild F-11 Husky 2
- Fairchild Super 71 50
- Fokker Universal
- Fokker Super Universal Composite
- Froebe helicopter
- Froebe ornithopter
- Heath Parasol
- Kolb Flyer
- Lockheed Model 10A Electra 1528
- McDonnell CF-101 Voodoo 101034
- Noorduyn Norseman IVW 2456
- North American Harvard
- North American NA-64 Yale 3430
- Schweizer SGU 2-22 glider C-FACL
- Stinson SR-8CM Reliant 9733
- Vickers Viscount 279
- Waco YKC-S 4267 – under restoration

== Archives and library ==
The comprehensive aviation reference library housed at the museum is one of the largest in the country, with holdings of books, magazines, technical manuals, and drawings, as well as some 40,000 photographs, films, and audiotapes, many of which cannot be found anywhere else.

One item in the archives is a rare, five-minute film of Amelia Earhart embarking on her solo trans-Atlantic flight from Harbour Grace, Newfoundland, on May 21, 1932.

The library is open to the public on an appointment basis and photos, films, and audiotapes are loaned or copied on request.

== Recovery and restoration ==
The museum has an active Restoration Department and has returned many damaged aircraft to full display condition. A team of volunteers completed a full-scale replica of a Canadian Vickers Vedette Mark V (CF-MAG) aircraft in May 2002.

The museum has facilitated the recovery of several aircraft, including the "Ghost of Charron Lake" - a Fokker Standard Universal that has taken more than 30 years to locate. It is displayed as it appeared at the bottom of the lake.

== Affiliations ==
The museum is affiliated with the Canadian Museums Association, Canadian Heritage Information Network, and the Virtual Museum of Canada.

== See also ==
- Minnesota Aviation Hall of Fame
- List of aerospace museums
- List of Canadian organizations with royal prefix
