= Bellanca Viking =

1967 touring aircraft family by Bellanca

17-30 Viking
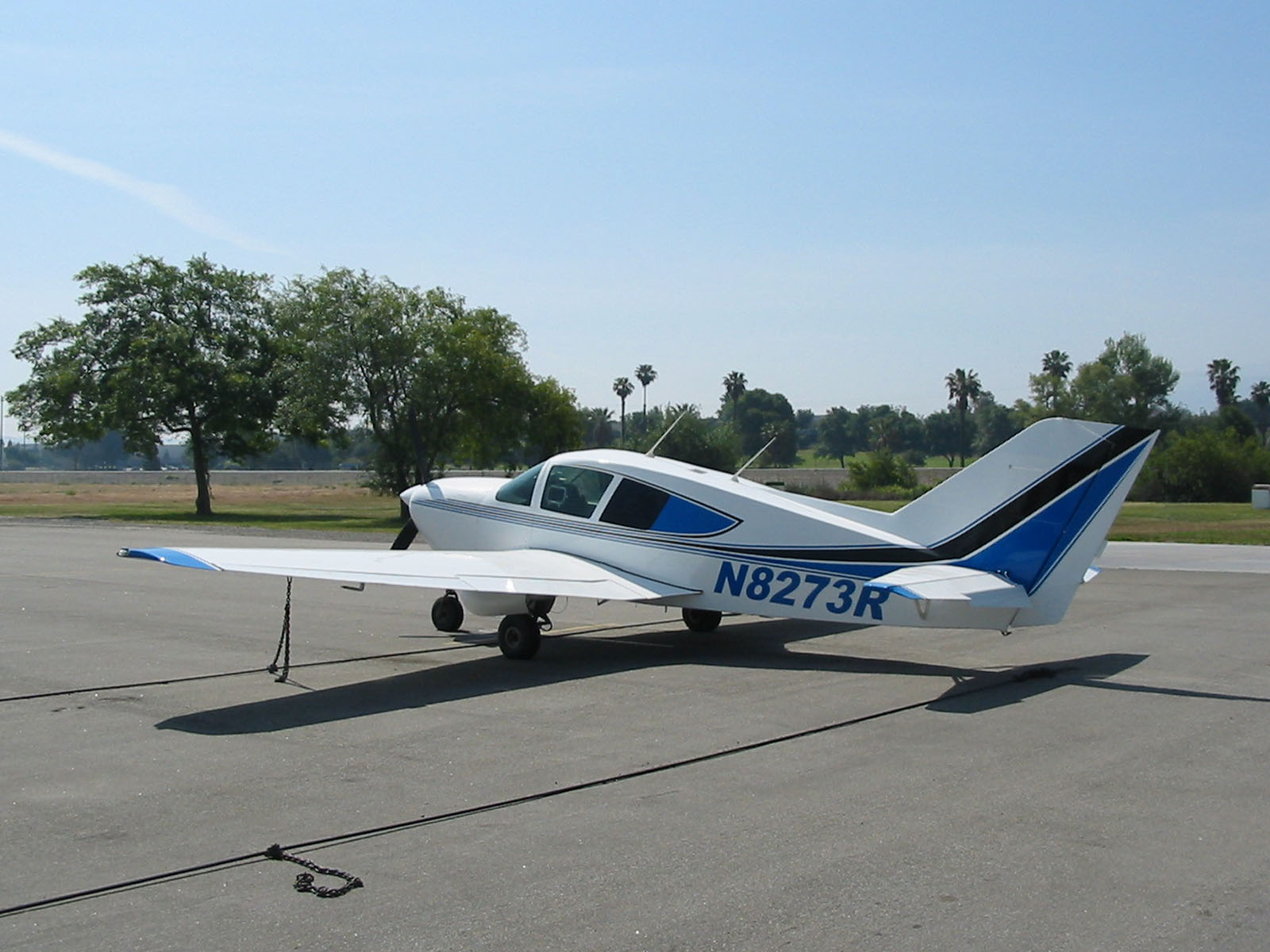
- A 1972 Model 17-30A

General information
- Type: Utility aircraft
- Manufacturer: Alexandria Aircraft; Bellanca
- Number built: 1,356

History
- Manufactured: 1968-2005
- First flight: 1967

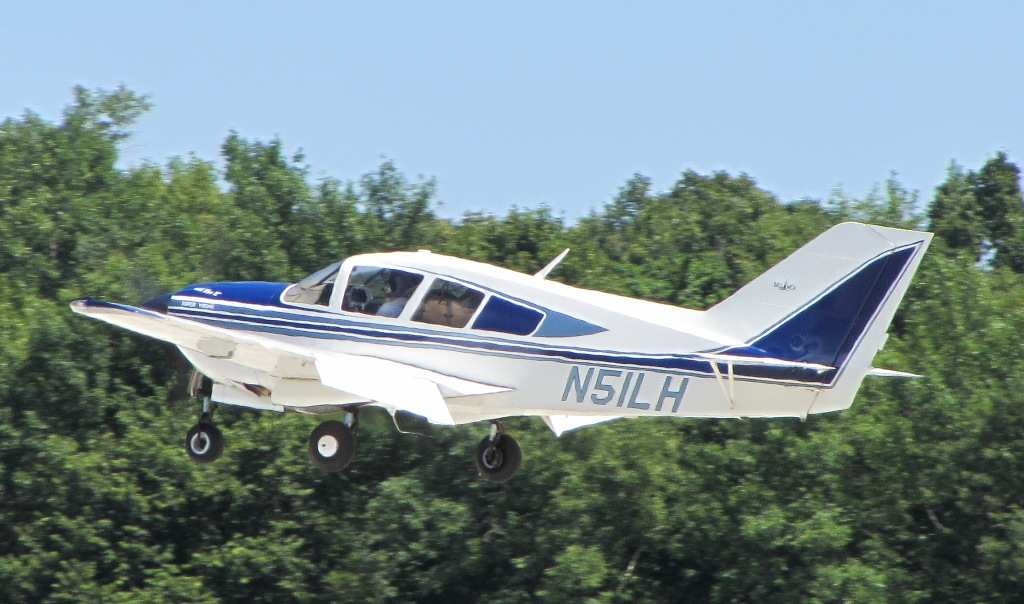
Bellanca Super Viking landing

The Bellanca Viking and Super Viking are a series of single-engine, four-seat, high performance, retractable gear aircraft manufactured in the USA during the 1960s and 1970s. The aircraft developed through modifications of classic designs by the aviation pioneer Giuseppe Bellanca. A total of 1,356 Vikings have been produced with most production between 1968 and 1975 (1019 planes).

== Development and design ==
The Viking is a derivative of the Bellanca Cruisair, a retractable gear taildragger with two extra vertical fins on the tips of the horizontal stabilizer. The 14-13 Cruisair series was developed into the larger, more powerful 14-19 Cruisemaster in the early 1950s. After the original Bellanca company went out of business, Downer Aircraft took over the type certificate and built the 14-19-2 Cruisemaster by mating the airframe with a Continental O-470 of 230 hp. In 1958, Downer redesigned the airplane with a nosewheel and fuel injected IO-470 of 260 hp, and redesignated it the 260. The 14-19-3 260 retained the wire-braced triple tail into the 1962 model year. After that year, the triple tail design was modified to a single tail with the same aggregate surface area, and manufactured as the Model 260A. The later Vikings retain the oversized vertical fin that contributes to the distinctive flying characteristics of the aircraft. The Viking model was born out of discussions at Downer for a bigger version of the "Model 260" with at least 300 horsepower. The company was based in Minnesota and employed skilled craftsmen who manufactured the wing from spruce, and the new 300 hp model was named the "Viking" in respect to the many Scandinavians of the area.

The first Model 17 Viking appeared in 1967 called the "17-30." It was powered by a 300 hp Continental IO-520-K. In 1969, a Viking powered by a 290 hp (later 300 hp) Lycoming IO-540 was introduced, either normally aspirated (17-31) or turbocharged (17-31TC).

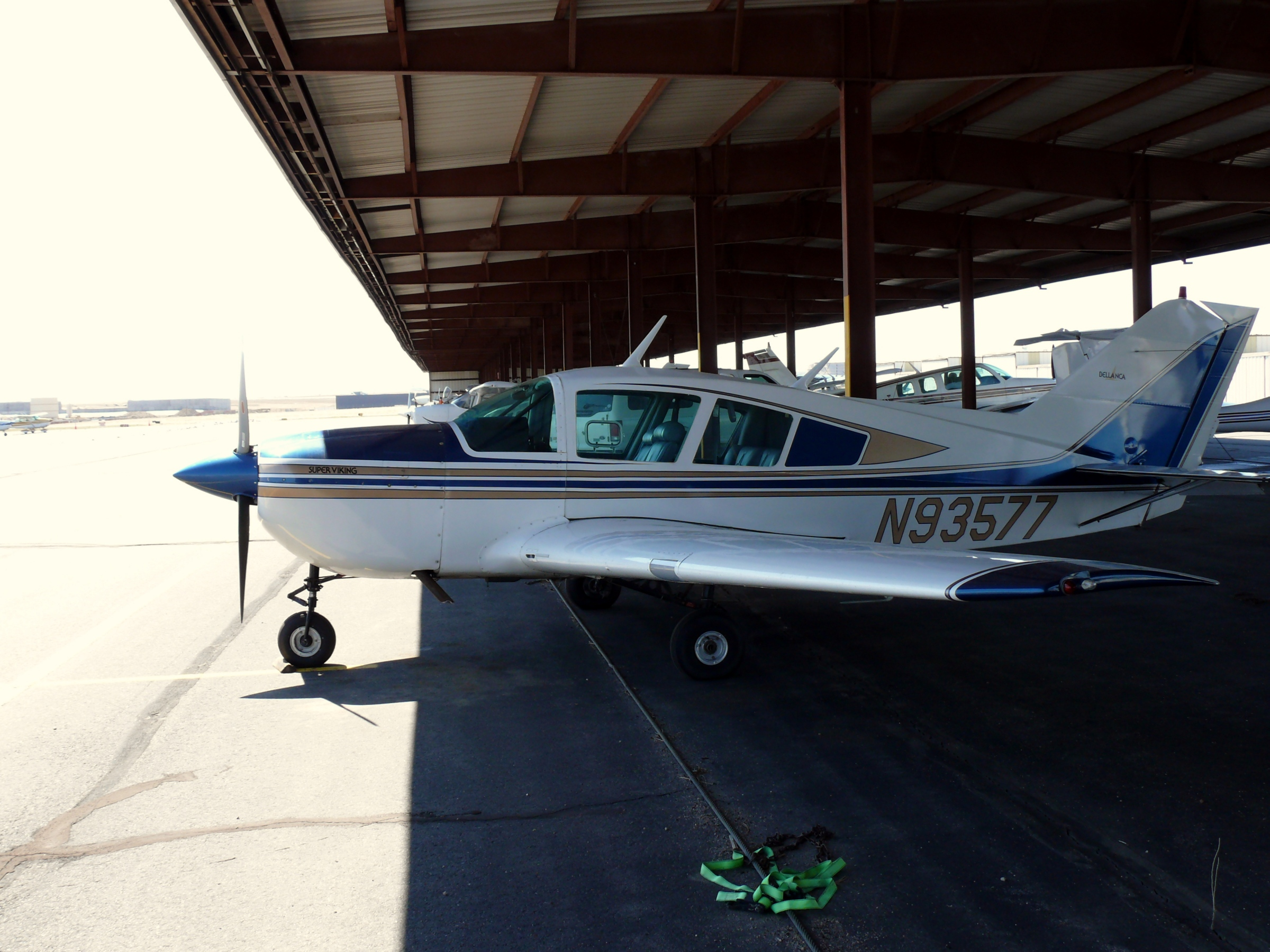
Bellanca Super Viking photographed at Centennial Airport

Over the years there were a number of refinements to the aircraft. The original hydraulic gear and flap actuation system was redesigned in 1968 introducing electric flaps. In 1969, the FAA issued Type Certificate A18CE and the aircraft built under that design were designated the "A" series "Super Vikings". Aside from refinements already made to late Viking 300 models, the new 300A Vikings (17-30A, 17-31A and 17-31ATC) had a gross weight increase to 3,325 lbs. The original complex fuel system with five tanks and two fuel selectors allowing eight possible combinations of selector settings was simplified to a left, right and auxiliary system in 1974. After several years of financial losses, Viking sales became profitable again in 1978. In 1979, Continental-powered Vikings sported a fully enclosed nosewheel thanks to a redesign of the engine mount. This necessitated the use of cowl flaps for the first time on the Viking but resulted in a 12 mph increase. In 1979 production of the Lycoming-powered 17-31A ceased. In 1996, the Continental IO-550 was made available as an option.

Since 2002, the company has been operated by a group of six Bellanca enthusiasts who bought the company from the state of Minnesota and established Alexandria Aircraft Co. LLC. They provide technical support and parts to owners and A&Ps in the field. They have sold one new aircraft, manufactured in 2005.

The aircraft fuselage is constructed from tubular steel overlaid with fabric, while the wings are fashioned from spruce with a plywood skin.

Bill Cox, an aviation journalist at Plane and Pilot Magazine commented regarding the flying qualities of Vikings that they "have long been famous for control response and harmony that seems almost psychic in nature", and asserted, "Owners almost unanimously pronounce the Viking the best handling airplane they've ever flown."

In 2022, the company moved to Sulphur, OK. The company now operates in Washington, Oklahoma under the name Bellanca Aircraft, Inc.

== Variants ==
17-30 Viking 300
Four-seat light cabin aircraft, powered by a 224-kW (300-hp) Continental IO-520-K piston engine.
17-31 Viking 300
Four-seat light cabin aircraft, powered by a 224-kW (300-hp) Lycoming IO-540 piston engine.
17-31TC Viking 300
Four-seat light cabin aircraft, powered by a 224-kW (300-hp) Lycoming IO-540 piston engine, the aircraft is fitted with turbocharger.
17-30A Super Viking 300A
Four-seat light cabin aircraft, powered by a 224-kW (300-hp) Continental IO-520-K piston engine.
17-31A Super Viking 300A
Four-seat light cabin aircraft, powered by a 224-kW (300-hp) Lycoming IO-540-K1E5 piston engine.
17-31ATC Turbo Super Viking 300A
Four-seat light cabin aircraft, powered by a 224-kW (300-hp) Lycoming IO-540-K1E5 piston engine, the aircraft is fitted with two Rajay turbochargers.

== Specifications (1976 17-30A Super Viking 300A) ==
Data from Jane's All the World's Aircraft 1976–77

General characteristics

- Crew: 1
- Capacity: 3 passengers
- Length: 26 ft 4 in (8.03 m)
- Wingspan: 34 ft 2 in (10.41 m)
- Height: 7 ft 4 in (2.24 m)
- Wing area: 161.5 sq ft (15.00 m^{2})
- Airfoil: Bellanca B
- Empty weight: 2,217 lb (1,006 kg)
- Max takeoff weight: 3,325 lb (1,508 kg)
- Fuel capacity: 60 US gal (50 imp gal; 230 L) usable fuel (normal), 75 US gal (62 imp gal; 280 L) with auxiliary tanks
- Powerplant: 1 × Continental IO-520-K air-cooled flat-six engine, 300 hp (220 kW)
- Propellers: 2 or 3-bladed McCauley constant-speed propeller, 6 ft 8 in (2.03 m) diameter

Performance

- Cruise speed: 188 mph (303 km/h, 163 kn) (TAS, 75% power, max. cruise)
- Stall speed: 70 mph (110 km/h, 61 kn) (wheels and flaps down, CAS)
- Never exceed speed: 226 mph (364 km/h, 196 kn) (IAS)
- Range: 923 mi (1,485 km, 802 nmi) (max. fuel)
- Service ceiling: 17,000 ft (5,200 m)
- Rate of climb: 1,170 ft/min (5.9 m/s)
- Takeoff run to 50 ft (15 m): 1,420 ft (433 m)
- Landing run from 50 ft (15 m): 1,340 ft (408 m)

== See also ==
Aircraft of comparable role, configuration, and era

- Beechcraft Bonanza
- Cessna 210
- Mooney M20
- Piper PA-24 Comanche
