= Bellanca Aircruiser =

Aircraft built by Bellanca Aircraft Corporation

Airbus/Aircruiser
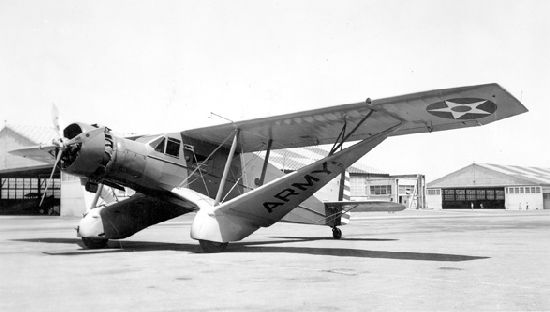
- Bellanca C-27C Airbus

General information
- Type: Passenger/cargo aircraft
- Manufacturer: Bellanca Aircraft Corporation
- Designer: Giuseppe Mario Bellanca
- Primary user: Private operators
- Number built: 23

History
- First flight: 1930

The Bellanca Aircruiser and Airbus are high-wing, single-engine aircraft built by Bellanca Aircraft Corporation of New Castle, Delaware. The aircraft was built as a "workhorse" intended for use as a passenger or cargo aircraft. It was available with wheels, floats or skis. The aircraft was powered by either a Wright Cyclone or Pratt and Whitney Hornet engine. The Airbus and Aircruiser served as both commercial and military transports.

== Design and development ==
The first Bellanca Airbus was built in 1930 as the P-100. An efficient design, it was capable of carrying 12 to 14 passengers depending on the cabin interior configuration, with later versions carrying up to 15. In 1931, test pilot George Haldeman flew the P-100 a distance of 4,400 miles in a time aloft of 35 hours. Although efficient, with a cost per mile figure of eight cents per mile calculated for that flight, the first Airbus did not sell due to its water-cooled engine.

== Operational history ==
The next model, the P-200 Airbus, was powered by a larger, more reliable air-cooled engine. One version (P-200-A) came with floats and operated as a ferry service in New York City, flying between Wall Street and the East River. Other versions included a P-200 Deluxe model, with custom interiors and seating for nine. The P-300 was designed to carry 15 passengers. The final model, the "Aircruiser," was the most efficient aircraft of its day, and would rank high amongst all aircraft designs. With a Wright Cyclone air-cooled supercharged radial engine rated at 715 hp, the Aircruiser could carry a useful load greater than its empty weight. In the mid-1930s, the Aircruiser could carry 4,000 lb payloads at a speed of between 145 and 155 mph, a performance that multi-engine Fokkers and Ford Trimotors could not come close to matching.

In 1934, United States federal regulations prohibited single-engine transports on United States airlines, virtually eliminating future markets for the Aircruiser. Where the workhorse capabilities of the Aircruiser stood out was in Canada. Several of "The Flying Ws", as it was commonly dubbed in Canada, were used in northern mining operations, ferrying ore, supplies and the occasional passenger, into the 1970s.

== Variants ==
=== Airbus ===
Bellanca P
Commercial version of Bellanca K, powered by a 500 hp (370 kW) Pratt & Whitney R-1860 Hornet.
P-100 Airbus

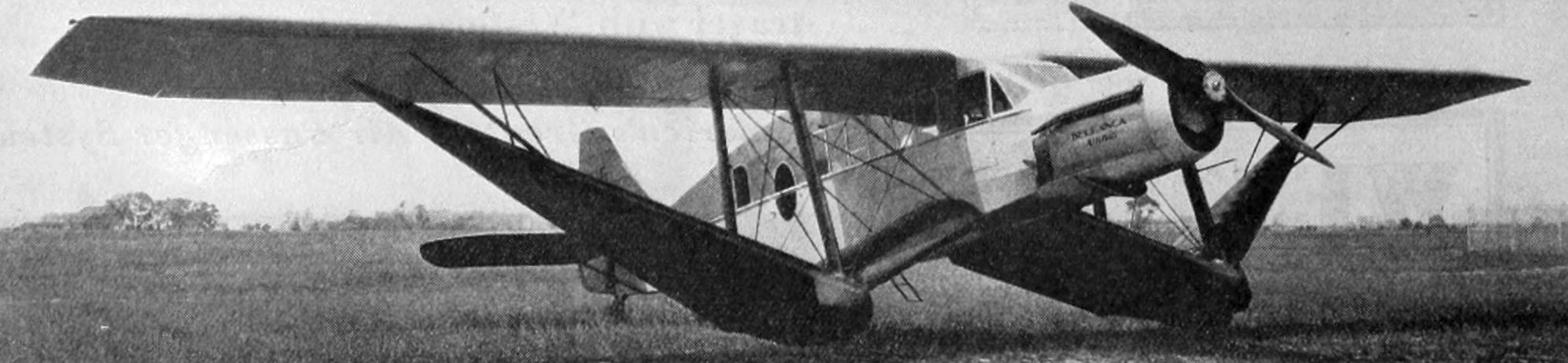
Bellanca P-100 Airbus photo from Aero Digest September,1930

14-passenger monoplane powered by a 600 hp (450 kW) Curtiss Conqueror engine, one built, later converted into a P-200.
P-200 Airbus
12-passenger monoplane, nine built and one converted from P-100.
P-300 Airbus
15-seater monoplane powered by a Wright R-1820 Cyclone engine.
Y1C-27
United States Army Air Corps designation for four P-200 Airbuses powered by 550 hp (410 kW) Pratt & Whitney R-1860 Hornet B engine. All later converted to C-27C.
C-27A Airbus
Production version of the Y1C-27 powered by a 650 hp (480 kW) Pratt & Whitney R-1860 Hornet B engine, ten built. One converted to a C-27B the rest converted to C-27Cs.
C-27B Airbus
One C-27A re-engined with a 675 hp (503 kW) Wright R-1820-17 Cyclone engine.
C-27C Airbus
Four Y1C-27s and nine of the C-27A re-engined with a 750 hp (560 kW) Wright R-1820-25 Cyclone engine.

=== Aircruiser ===
Aircruiser 66-67
Improved structure modified from a P-200 with a 675 hp (503 kW) Wright SR-1820 Cyclone engine
Aircruiser 66-70
An Aircruiser with a 710 hp (530 kW) Wright SGR-1820 Cyclone engine, five built - exported to Canada.
Aircruiser 66-75
An Aircruiser with a 730 hp (540 kW) Wright Cyclone engine, three built.
Aircruiser 66-76
A cargo-version of the Aircruiser with a 760 hp (570 kW) Wright Cyclone.
Aircruiser 66-80
An Aircruiser with an 850 hp (630 kW) Wright Cyclone engine.

== Operators ==
Canada

- Canadian Pacific Airlines (Aircruiser)
- Central Northern Airways (Aircruiser)
- Mackenzie Air Service (Aircruiser)

United States

- New York and Suburban Airlines (Airbus)
- United States Army Air Corps (Airbus)

Mexico
Philippines

== Surviving aircraft ==
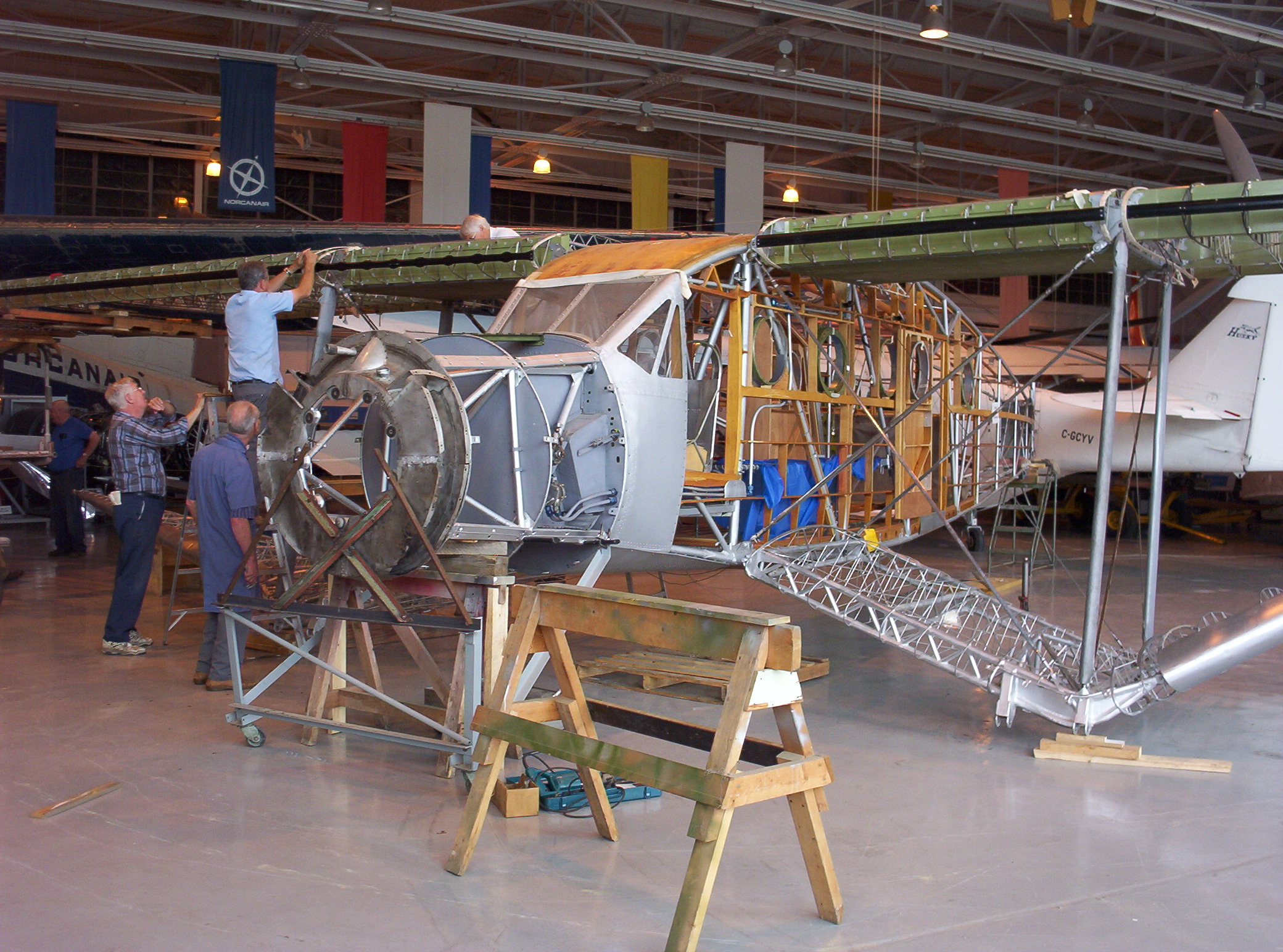
Bellanca Aircruiser under restoration at the Western Canada Aviation Museum, Winnipeg, 2006

The last flying Aircruiser, "CF-BTW," a 1938 model, after serving in Manitoba, is now on display at the Erickson Aircraft Collection in Madras, Oregon.

Another Bellanca Aircruiser, "CF-AWR" named the "Eldorado Radium Silver Express", built in 1935, is under restoration at the Western Canada Aviation Museum in Winnipeg, Manitoba.

== Specifications (66-70 Aircruiser) ==
General characteristics

- Crew: one, pilot
- Capacity: 16 passengers
- Length: 43 ft 4 in (13.21 m)
- Wingspan: 65 ft 0 in (19.82 m)
- Height: 11 ft 6 in (3.51 m)
- Wing area: 520 sq ft (48.3 m^{2})
- Empty weight: 6,072 lb (2,754 kg)
- Gross weight: 10,000 lb (4,536 kg)
- Powerplant: 1 × Wright R-1820 Cyclone 9 9-cylinder supercharged air-cooled radial engine, 710 hp (530 kW)

Performance

- Maximum speed: 144 kn (165 mph, 266 km/h)
- Range: 608 nmi (700 mi, 1,130 km)
- Service ceiling: 22,000 ft (6,700 m)

== See also ==
- Giuseppe Mario Bellanca

Related lists

- List of civil aircraft
- List of military aircraft of the United States
