= Bellanca 14-13 =

American light aircraft

14-13 Cruisair Senior
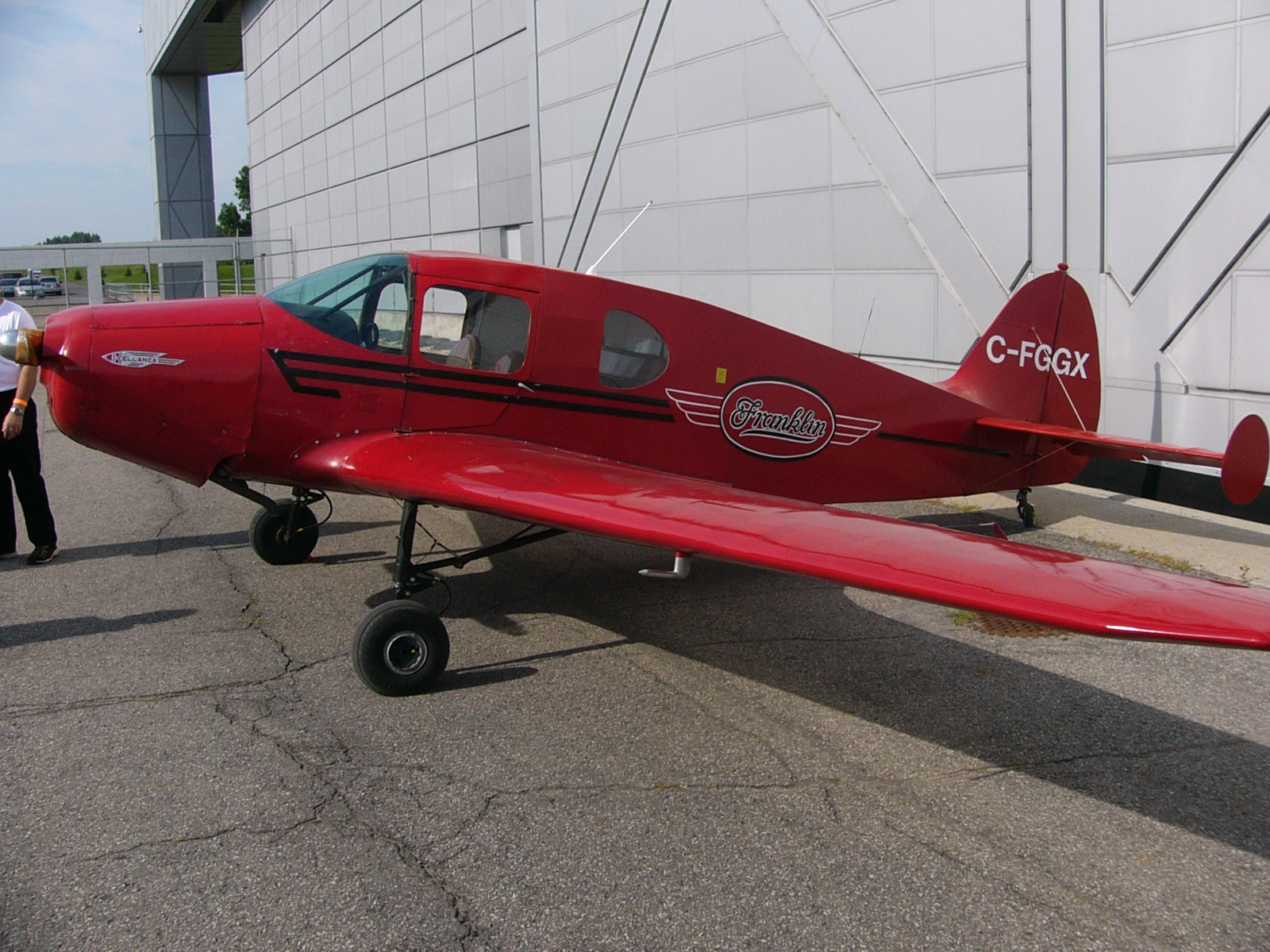
- Bellanca 14-13-2

General information
- Type: Civil utility aircraft
- Manufacturer: Bellanca
- Number built: ca. 589

History
- First flight: November 13, 1945
- Developed from: Bellanca 14-7
- Variants: Bellanca 17-30

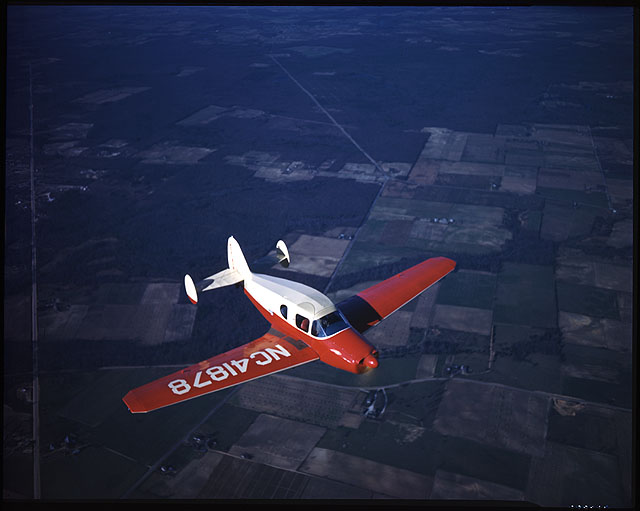
Bellanca 14-13 first production s/n 1060

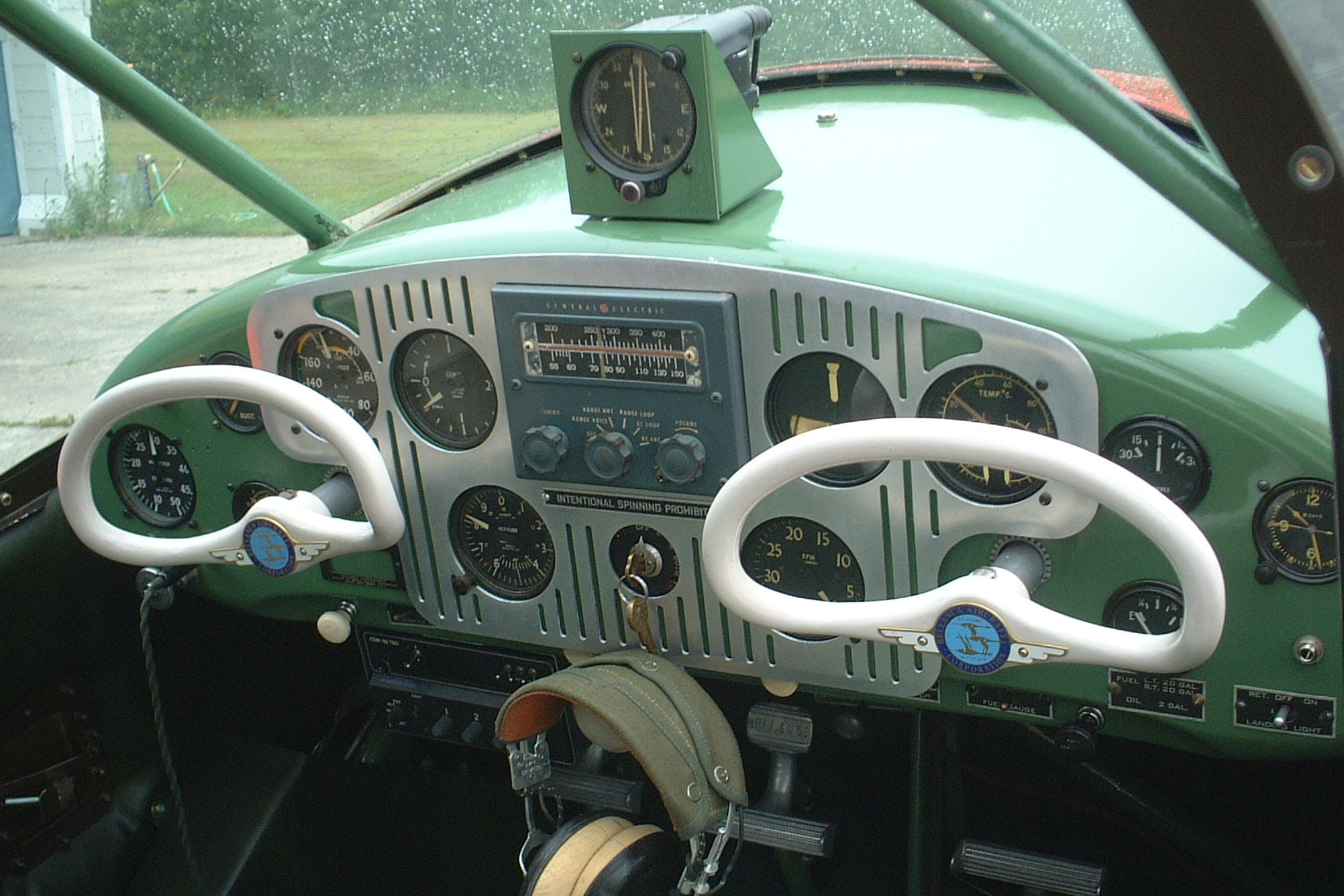
Bellanca 14-13-2 nearly original instrument panel

The Bellanca 14-13 Cruisair Senior and its successors are a family of light aircraft that were manufactured in the United States by AviaBellanca Aircraft after World War II. They were a follow-up to the prewar Bellanca 14-7 and its derivatives.

== Design and development ==
The 14-13 retained the Bellanca 14-7's basic design, but had a redesigned fuselage structure which included an enlarged cabin, a horizontally opposed Franklin 6A4-335-B3 150 hp (112 kW) engine in place of the earlier models' various 70 to 120 hp (52 to 89 kW) engines, and an oval vertical endplate on each horizontal stabiliser. This latter feature gained the type the affectionate nickname "cardboard Constellation", because the arrangement was similar to the contemporary Lockheed Constellation airliner.

Taking its numbering convention from the Bellanca tradition of identifying the series from the wing area in square feet, dropping the final digit, while the second number was the aircraft's horsepower, again dropping the final digit, the 14-13 had been planned to be powered by the 130 hp (97 kW) Franklin 6AC-298-F3 horizontal piston engine; the designation was not updated to 14-15 when a 150 hp (112 kW) engine was actually used. The Bellanca 14-13 wing was constructed of wood, while the fuselage and tail were welded steel-tube framework with a fabric covering.

Eventually the 150 hp (112 kW) Franklin could be upgraded to 165 hp (123 kW) with the FAA Type Certificate stating “Installation eligible only when original basic Franklin 6A4-150-B3 engine installation components utilized ..”. The 165 hp (123 kW) required the use of either a Koppers Aeromatic or Sensenich Skyblade propeller.

The 14-13 was introduced in 1946; in its improved 14-13-3 version the aircraft remained in production until 1949.

=== Model 14-19 ===
A higher-performance design revision was granted FAA approval as the 14-19 Cruisemaster on September 26, 1949. The new model had structural upgrades, a 190 hp (142 kW) Lycoming O435-A engine, an increased gross weight of 2,600 lb (1,179 kg), hydraulically operated landing gear and flaps, and an improved interior. 99 of these airplanes were produced between 1949 and 1951. Externally very similar to the earlier models, this version was distinguished by its larger, oval-shaped endplates. All production ceased in 1956 as Bellanca wound up its operations.

=== Model 14-19-2 ===
The 14-19 design was revived by Northern Aircraft and granted FAA approval on January 7, 1957, as the 14-19-2 Cruisemaster. The new model had a 230 hp (172 kW) Continental O-470K engine, an increased gross weight of 2,700 pounds, an updated instrument panel, and new paint and upholstery schemes. 104 of these aircraft were produced between 1957 and 1958.

The company was renamed Downer Aircraft in 1959. Inter-Air acquired the production rights in 1962 and was renamed as the Bellanca Sales Company, a subsidiary of Miller Flying Service. Further development of the design by Inter-Air resulted in the modernized Viking series introduced in 1962.

== Operational history ==
The Bellanca 14-13 Cruisair Senior was aimed at the general aviation market, offering a combination of performance, low engine power and a modest price. Its performance and structural strength also made it attractive for utility work, but in many ways the Bellanca design was an anachronism, relying on a conventional landing gear configuration and wood-and-fabric construction that harkened back to an earlier age. Only about 600 were produced, due to the postwar economy and a glut of surplus military aircraft.

The 14-13-2 was one of the aircraft tested by August Raspet and George Lambros of the Aerospace Department of Mississippi State College. With its propeller removed and towed behind a 450 hp (336 kW) Stearman, the performance of the 14-13-2 was carefully studied and reported in technical publication Research Reviews, April 1954 as "Flight Research on a Personal Type Airplane". Raspet and Lambros found the 14-13-2's maximum speed to be 149 mph (240 km/h) and its cruise speed at 75% power to be 131 mph (211 km/h).

In 1952, Canadian Joshua Haldeman and his wife Winifred flew their 14-13-2 from Pretoria, South Africa to Oslo, Norway and back. In 1954, the Haldemans flew their 14-13-2 from South Africa to Australia and back. Over many years, the Haldemans also explored the Kalahari Desert with the 14-13-2.

Despite its introduction in a period when private aircraft sales were stagnant, the aircraft remained popular through all of its incarnations, becoming considered a classic cabin monoplane and much in demand.

The last 14-13-3 recorded in the Smithsonian archives is serial number 1648.

== Variants ==
Cruisair Senior 14-13
Initial model introduced in 1946. Serial numbers 1060 (prototype) and 1061 to 1385.
Cruisair Senior 14-13-2
Improved model introduced in 1947. Featured a longer-span elevator and stabilizer with smaller end-plates, revised wood construction and revised elevator stops among others. Serial numbers 1386 through 1583.
Cruisair Senior 14-13-3
Improved model introduced in 1948. Featured dual landing lights in left wing leading edge, revised oleo struts and nut cracker, revised instrument panel and an external baggage door among others. Serial numbers 1584 and up. Remained in production until 1956
Cruisair Station Wagon 14-13W
First described in the 1948 Cruisair sales brochure. Featured plywood-lined cabin, removable rear seats and extra door on the left side of the cabin among others. Serial numbers 1584 and up.
Cruisemaster 14-19
190 hp (142 kW) version introduced in 1949. Serial numbers 2000 and 2002 through 4000.
Cruisemaster 14-19-2
230 hp (172 kW) version introduced in 1957. Serial numbers 4001 through 4105.
260 A 14-19-3
260 hp (194 kW) tricycle gear version introduced in 1959. Serial numbers 4106 through 4228.
260 B 14-19-3A
Last version built by Downer Aircraft priced at $19,500 in 1962 - Powered by a 260 hp (194 kW) Continental IO-470-F engine. Serial numbers 4229 through 4342.
Downer 260C Model 14-19-3C
Version built by Inter-Air with revised empennage and 260 hp (194 kW) Continental IO-470-F engine

== Specifications (14-13 Cruisair Senior) ==
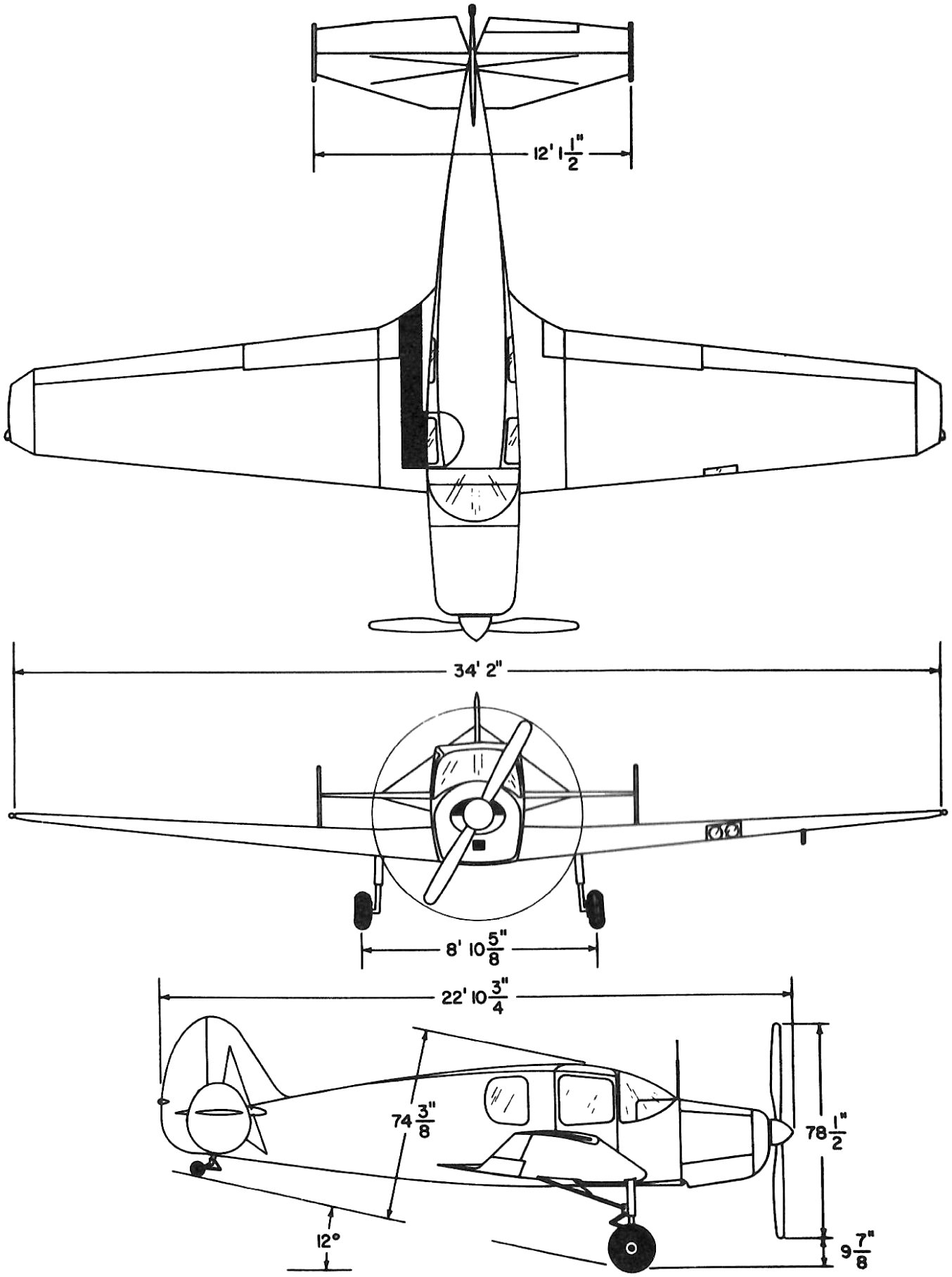
3-view line drawing of the Bellanca Cruisemaster

Data from Jane's all the World's Aircraft 1947

General characteristics

- Crew: 1
- Capacity: 3 passengers
- Length: 21 ft 4 in (6.5 m) tail up
- Wingspan: 34 ft 2 in (10.41 m)
- Height: 6 ft 2 in (1.88 m) tail down
- Wing area: 140.2 sq ft (13.03 m^{2}) 160 sq ft (14.87 m^{2}) including wing area projected through fuselage
- Airfoil: Bellanca B
- Empty weight: 1,200 lb (544 kg)
- Gross weight: 2,100 lb (953 kg)
- Fuel capacity: 40 US gal (33 imp gal; 150 L) in two tanks
- Powerplant: 1 × Franklin 6A4-150-B3 6 cyl. horizontally-opposed air-cooled piston engine, 150 hp (110 kW) at 2,600 rpm
- Propellers: 2-bladed Sensenich fixed pitch airscrew

Performance

- Maximum speed: 169 mph (272 km/h, 147 kn) at 2,700 rpm
- Cruise speed: 154 mph (248 km/h, 134 kn) at 2,435 rpm
- Stall speed: 45 mph (72 km/h, 39 kn) with flaps
- Rate of climb: 1,130 ft/min (5.7 m/s)
- Wing loading: 13 lb/sq ft (63 kg/m^{2})
- Power/mass: 14 lb/hp (2.875 kg/kW)
- Take-off run: 485 ft (148 m)

== See also ==
- Giuseppe Mario Bellanca

Related development

- Bellanca 14-7
- Bellanca 17-30

Aircraft of comparable role, configuration, and era

- Miles Messenger
