= Barney Smith =

Barney Smith may refer to:

- Barney Smith (diplomat)
- Barney Smith (artist)
