= Lone Star Flight Museum =

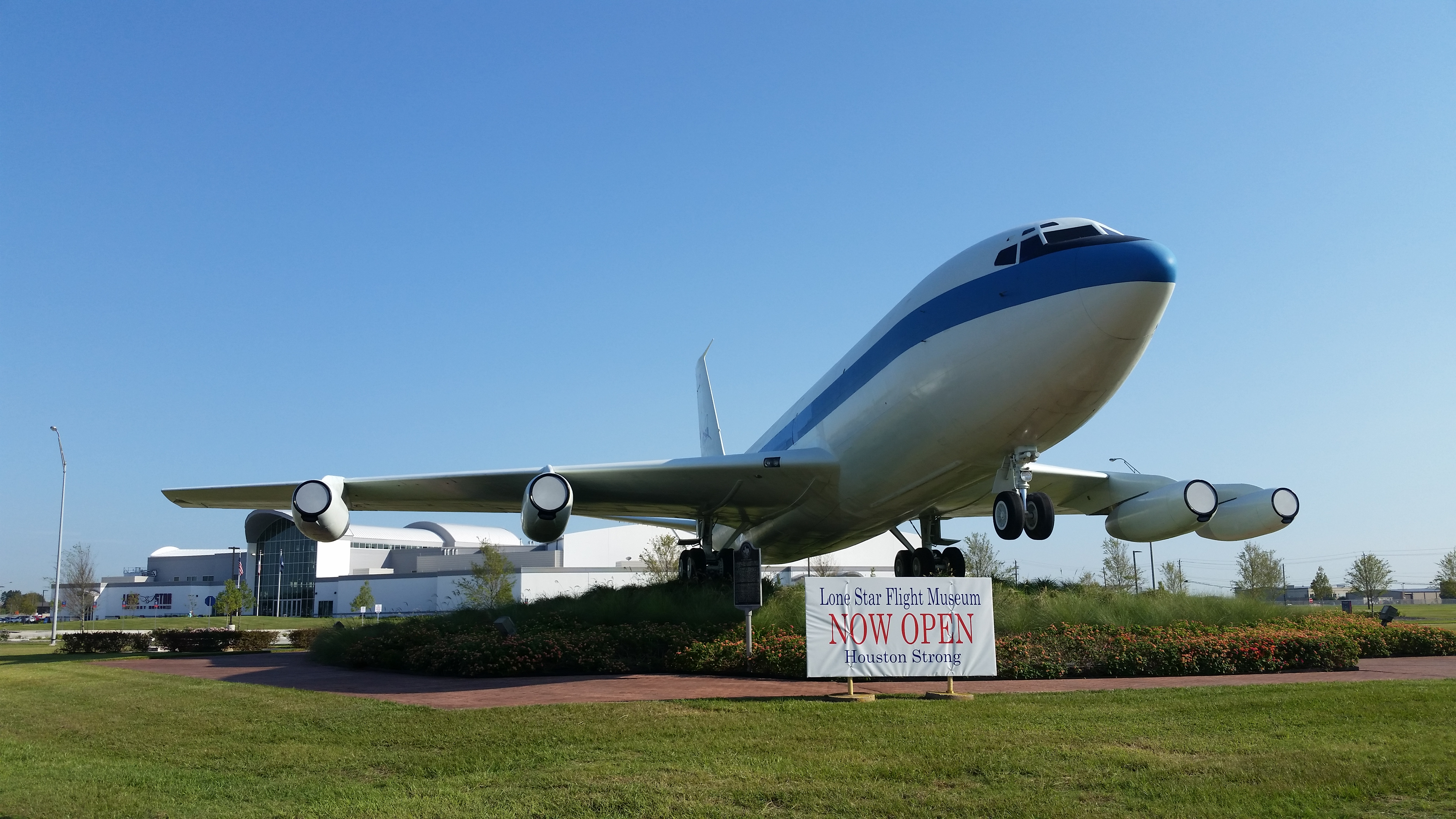
- New location of museum at Ellington Field

- Location within Texas
- Location: Houston, Texas
- Coordinates: 29.603833°N 95.175082°W
- Type: Aviation museum
- Founder: Robert L. Waltrip
- CEO: Douglas Owens
- Website: lonestarflight.org

The Lone Star Flight Museum, located in Houston, Texas, is an aerospace museum that displays more than 24 historically significant aircraft, and many artifacts related to the history of flight. Located at Ellington Airport, the museum is housed on about 100,000 ft^{2} (10,000 m^{2}) of property, including its own airport ramp. The museum, formerly located in Galveston, moved to Houston to avoid a repeat of the devastation suffered during Hurricane Ike.

== History ==
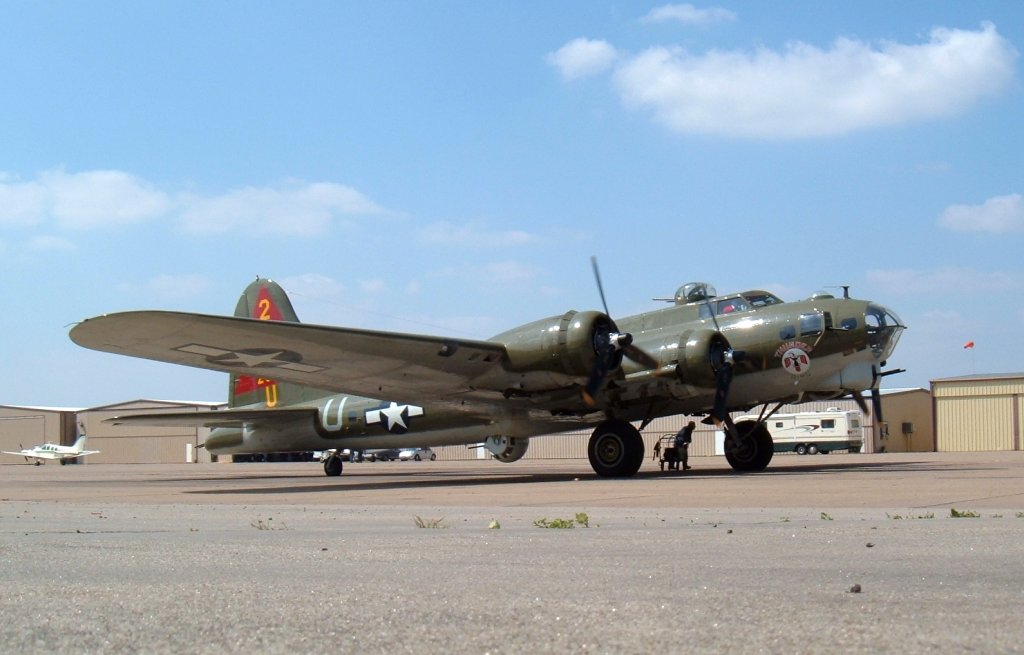
The largest aircraft owned and operated by the museum was a Boeing B-17G, christened Thunderbird.

The museum began as a private collection of historic aircraft in 1985. By 1990, that collection had grown enough that its owner decided to place them on public display. The Lone Star Flight Museum, a non-profit organization funded entirely through private donations, was formed for that purpose.

=== 2008 damage and restoration ===
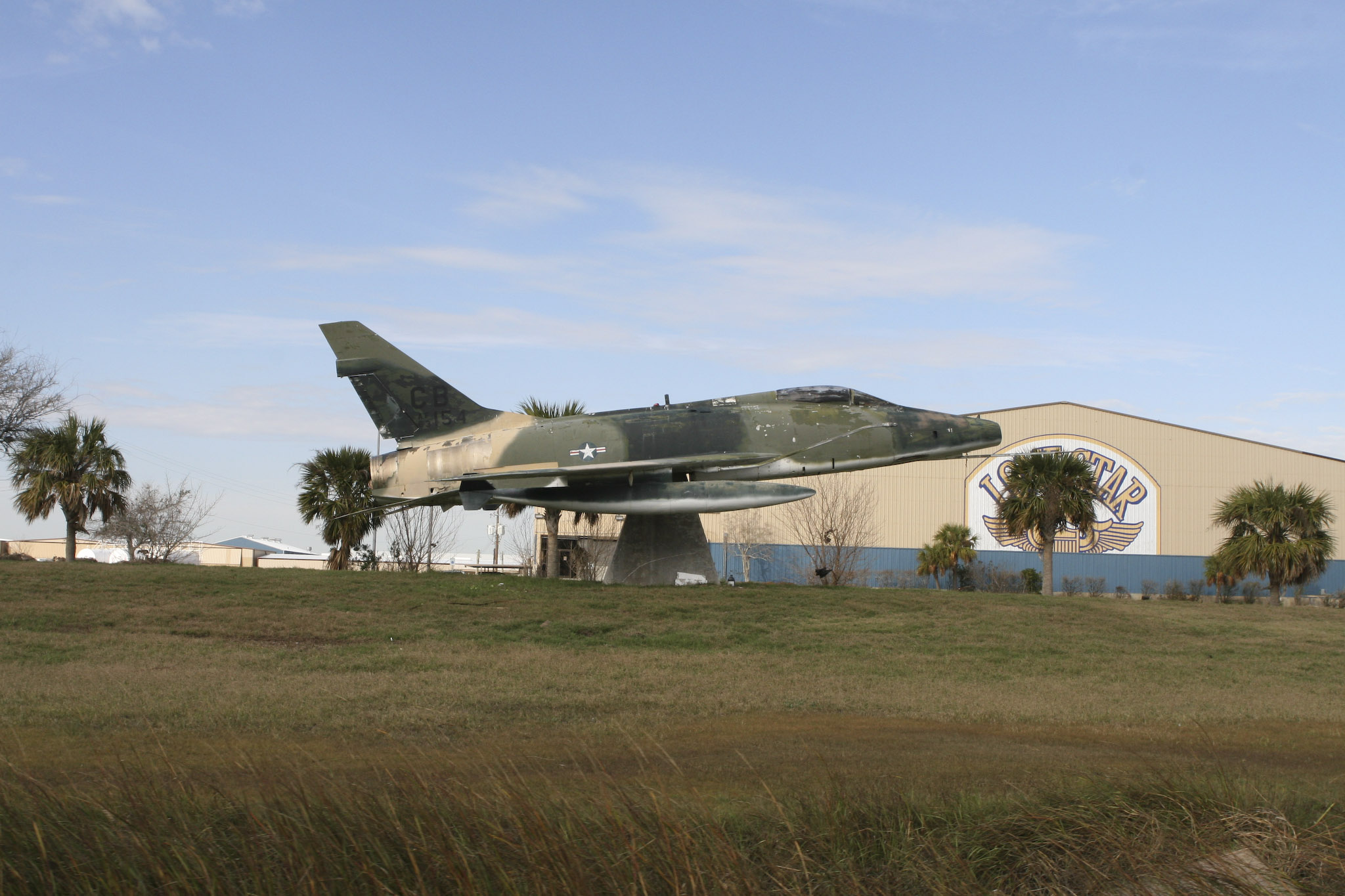
Lone Star Flight Museum, December 2008, after damage from Hurricane Ike. Pictured here is a North American F-100D Super Sabre.

The museum reported heavy damage from Hurricane Ike, stating on September 16, 2008, that the hangars and Hall of Fame had received seven to eight feet of water and the lobby three to four. Damaged aircraft included a TB-58A and F-100 on loan from the US Air Force Museum, Consolidated PBY-5A, Consolidated PB4Y-2 Privateer, de Havilland DH-82A, Grumman F3F-2, Lockheed PV-2D, and Stinson L-5. Aircraft flown out of harm's way in advance included their B-17, B-25, DC-3, P-47, F6F, F4U, SBD, PT-17, T-6 and the F8F. Most of the airworthy planes were flown out of the museum prior to the hurricane. Those remaining as well as the static displays were largely destroyed or heavily damaged. The TB-58 went to Little Rock Air Force Base. The PBY-5A and the PB4Y-2 went to the Pima Air & Space Museum.

=== TF-51 crash ===
On October 23, 2013 a P-51 (TF-51) Mustang owned by the museum crashed in Halls Lake, just south west of the museum. Both the pilot and a paying passenger from the UK were killed in the crash.

=== Move to Houston ===
Following the destruction of Hurricane Ike, the museum made the decision to move to Ellington International Airport in Houston. It is working with the Collings Foundation and Texas Flying Legends to create a combined aviation museum complex. In March 2014, the museum received $7.6 million from FEMA. The museum broke ground at its new location on November 9, 2015. Initially scheduled to be dedicated on September 1, 2017, the opening was postponed to September 16 due to Hurricane Harvey. Three days later the museum traded its F6F to the Erickson Aircraft Collection in exchange for a TBM Avenger.

The museum acquired a former NASA Motion Base Simulator from Texas A&M University.

The museum sold its P-47 to the Evansville Wartime Museum in 2020. A few months later it also sold its B-17 to the Mid America Flight Museum. At the same time, Howard 250 was acquired from the latter and arrived the following spring. In 2025, the museum sold its A-24 to the Fagen Fighters WWII Museum.

== Exhibits ==
The museum has featured exhibits on the September 11th attacks and Women Airforce Service Pilots.

=== Texas Aviation Hall of Fame ===
The Texas Aviation Hall of Fame, located within the museum, honors the contributions of residents or natives of Texas to aviation and spaceflight. Inductees include Howard Hughes, Gordon Bethune, Emma Carter Browning, Alan Bean, Senator Lloyd Bentsen, Azellia White and President George H. W. Bush.

== Airshows ==
The museum's collection often participates in airshows across the country. As of 2005, the museum's aircraft annually log more than 40,000 miles (60,000 km) of cross-country flying to various air demonstrations.

The museum's P-47 Thunderbolt participated in USAF Heritage Flights throughout the year. The USAF Heritage Flight program was established in 1997 to commemorate the Air Force's 50th anniversary. It involves today's state-of-the-art fighters flying in close formation with World War II, Korean and Vietnam era fighters such as the P-51 Mustang and the F-86 Sabre. The flight's mission is to safely and proudly display the evolution of US Air Force airpower and to support the Air Force's recruiting and retention efforts.

The museum's North American B-25 Mitchell also serves closely with the Disabled American Veterans program. The DAV Airshow Outreach Program was developed to increase public awareness of disabled veterans and to serve veterans in communities across the nation. Using two B-25 medium bombers, the program reminds the public of the sacrifices veterans have made.

In 2007, the museum launched its newest program by offering rides in some of its warbirds. The LSFM operated flights for passengers in the B-17 Flying Fortress, North American B-25 Mitchell, T-6 Texan and the PT-17 Stearman.

The Museum also has a flying Douglas DC-3 in the paint scheme of Continental Airlines. The Museum's DC-3 was produced in 1940 and flew seven years for American Airlines. It was later bought by TransTexas Airways, which would later acquire Continental Airlines. When Gordon Bethune, CEO of Continental Airlines, was inducted into the TAHF in 2004, Continental Airlines donated the aircraft to the Flight Museum.

== Collection ==
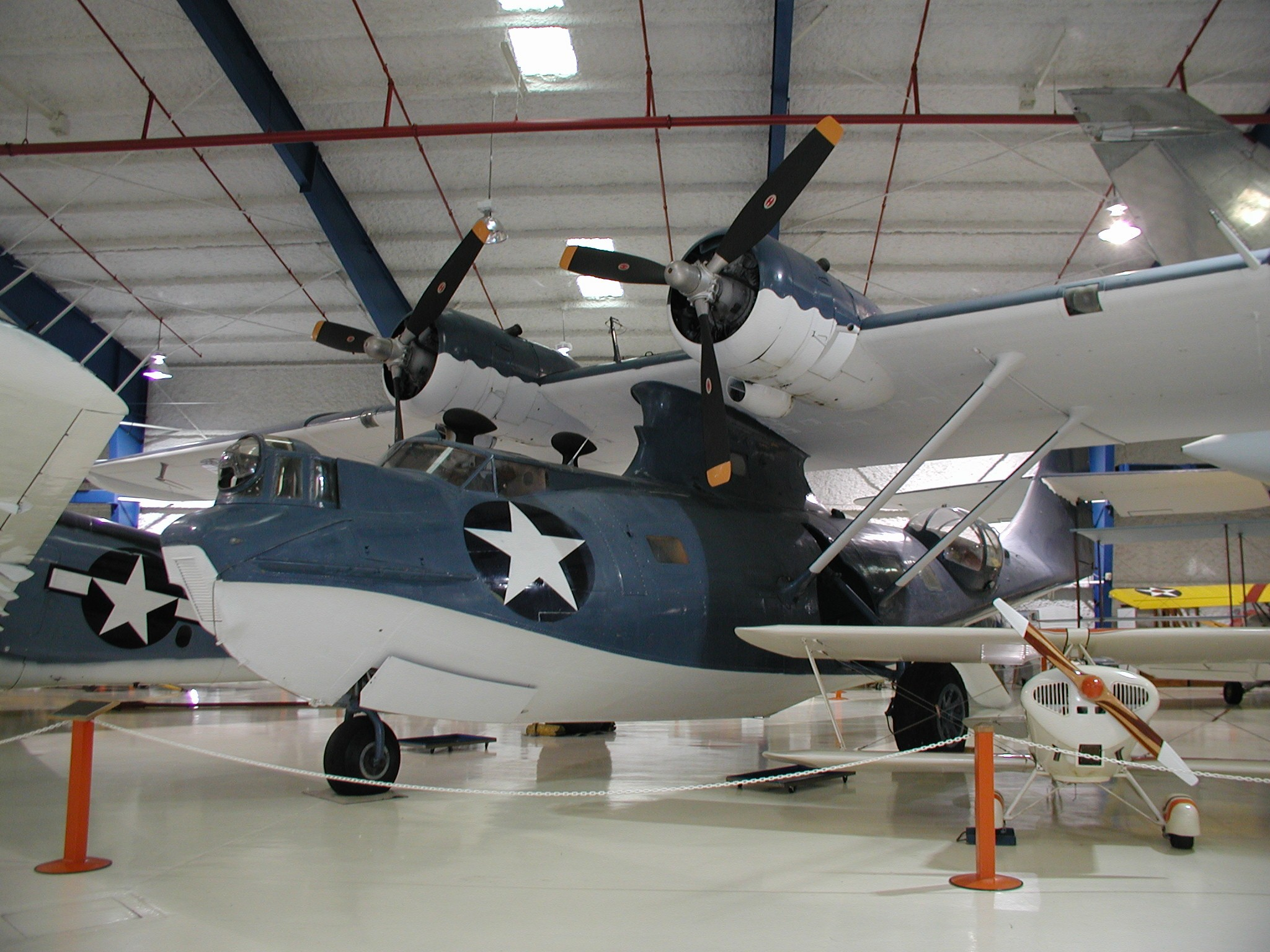
PBY Catalina

- Anderson Greenwood AG-14
- Beecraft Honey Bee
- Boeing N2S-3 Kaydet 7718
- Boeing N2S-5 Kaydet 38490
- Cessna 172E Skyhawk – It has been converted to T-41 configuration.
- Cessna L-19 Bird Dog
- Culver Dart GC
- Douglas DC-3 2213
- Fairchild F-24 – on loan
- Fairchild PT-19 Cornell
- General Atomics MQ-1B Predator
- General Motors TBM Avenger 53575
- Howard 250
- Luscombe T8F – on loan
- North American B-25J Mitchell 44-86734
- North American SNJ-5 Texan 85053
- Piper L-4 Grasshopper – on loan
- Piper L-4H Grasshopper
- Piper PA-39 Twin Comanche
- Sikorsky S-76A
- Vought F4U-5N Corsair 121881
- Vultee BT-13 Valiant

== See also ==
- North American aviation halls of fame
