= Emma Carter Browning =

American pilot and executive (1910–2010)

- Born: October 26, 1910; Eastland, Texas, United States
- Died: April 23, 2010 (aged 99); Austin, Texas, United States
- Spouse: Robert McAlpin Browning (m. 1932; died 1973)
- Children: Robert McAlpin "Bobby" Browning III (June 25, 1934 – July 25, 2002)

Emma Carter Browning (October 26, 1910 – April 23, 2010) was an American pilot and aviation executive from Texas.

== Early life and education ==
Browning was born on October 26, 1910, in Eastland, Texas, to James William Carter and Pamelia Louisa Gilbreath. She was one of eleven children. Her mother died when she was eight, and by the age of fourteen Browning was in charge of the household. She went on to attend Abilene Business College at the urging of her father, planning to go into the insurance industry.

== Aviation career ==
In 1929, at the Texas Air Fair, she rode in an airplane for the first time—an Alexander Eaglerock biplane.

She met pilot Robert McAlpin Browning (1897-1973) in 1930 on a blind date—he had recently moved to Abilene from Wichita Falls—and the two were married on December 26, 1932. On June 25, 1934, their son, Robert McAlpin "Bobby" Browning III, was born. During the Great Depression, the Brownings made money selling airplane rides, performing in air shows, and barnstorming. While Robert flew, Emma would assist as co-pilot or water girl, but over time she began to focus on managing the ground operation. The couple managed Abilene Airport, through which they met Amelia Earhart, who stayed with the Brownings while her plane underwent repairs.

With teaching help from her husband, Browning was certified as a solo pilot in 1939; her first solo flight was in a Taylorcraft biplane. The same year, the Brownings's friend Hugh Herndon told them about the government's Civilian Pilot Training Program (CPTP); in September the family flew their Stinson SM-8 to University Airport in Austin. They leased the airport from Webb Ruff and founded Browning Aerial Service, Inc., a flight school dedicated to training civilian pilots through the CPTP. Browning graduated from a pilot training program sponsored by the Austin Chamber of Commerce in 1940.

In 1940, Emma and Robert Browning were among the founders of the Texas Flight Training Association, now known as the National Air Transportation Association; they were also involved with the establishment of the Civil Aeronautics Authority in 1941 and the Texas Aeronautics Commission in 1945.

When World War II broke out, the CPTP was converted to the War Training Service. Browning Aerial Service began training pilots for the US Army Air Corps, and it was the only flight school licensed to offer advanced training on the Waco UPF-7. At the height of the war, they owned 21 aircraft and employed ten flight instructors.

In 1946, Browning Aerial Service relocated to Robert Mueller Municipal Airport, where the company, alongside Ragsdale Flying Service, continued to thrive. In addition to a flight school, they also offered aircraft storage, maintenance, sales, and charters; Browning Aerial distributed Piper aircraft during the post-war general aviation boom. The Brownings also had a 25-year charter with the University of Texas to provide transportation to and from the McDonald Observatory, and contracted with the city to provide service for commercial planes.

I never expected special privileges...
Now I own a piece of this mighty thing called aviation.

— Emma Carter Browning

Browning Aerial Service constructed its own terminal, Browning Terminal, at Robert Mueller Municipal Airport. Work began in 1962 and finished in 1963. By the 1970s, the Brownings employed 40 people and occupied 100,000 sq. ft. of hangar space. Due to its status as the state capital, governors and other officials would often fly in and out of Austin; Browning made sure to work hard and impress them, establishing a good reputation.

When her husband Robert died in June 1973, Browning became president of Browning Aerial Service; their son Bobby served as general manager and vice-president. She was known as a shrewd businesswoman—when once asked by Charles Lindbergh to borrow a plane during maintenance, Browning replied: "Charlie, we don't loan airplanes, we rent them." After nearly 15 years as president, Browning sold the company to London-based Signature Flight Services in August 1987.

== Later life and recognition ==
Predeceased by her son, Bobby, who died on July 25, 2002, aged 68, Emma Carter Browning received the Lifetime Achievement in Aviation Award from Governor Rick Perry in March 2003 in honor of her achievements. In June 2005, she was inducted into the Texas Aviation Hall of Fame.

Emma Carter Browning died on April 23, 2010, six months before what would have been her 100th birthday. Later that year, General Aviation Avenue at Austin–Bergstrom International Airport was renamed in her honor.
