= Mississippi State University XAZ-1 Marvelette =

XAZ-1 Marvelette
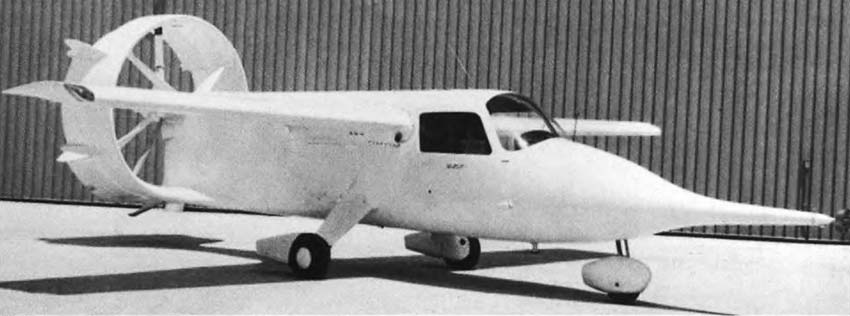

General information
- Type: Experimental aircraft
- National origin: United States of America
- Manufacturer: Mississippi State University
- Primary user: United States Army
- Number built: 1

History
- First flight: 16 November 1962
- Retired: March 1964
- Developed from: Anderson Greenwood AG-14
- Developed into: XV-11 Marvel

The Mississippi XAZ-1 Marvelette (or MA18-B Marvelette) was an American research aircraft of the 1960s. A converted Anderson Greenwood AG-14 light single-engined pusher aircraft, it provided the test-bed, or test platform, on which to test the boundary layer control system and ducted propeller installation of the planned XV-11 Marvel STOL research aircraft. One aircraft was converted to XAZ-1 configuration; although underpowered, it provided valuable test data over a year-long flight program. Following the conclusion of test flying, the aircraft was used for ground testing before being scrapped.

== Development and design ==
The Department of Aerophysics at the Mississippi State University had been involved in a programme of research into boundary layer control on behalf of the Office of Naval Research and the US Army since 1950, carrying out trials on a modified Schweizer TG-3 glider, a Piper L-21 and a Cessna O-1. As a result of these studies, the US Army awarded the Department a contract to develop a new STOL research aircraft: the XV-11 MARVEL ("Mississippi Aerophysics Research Vehicle, Extended Latitude"). The new aircraft was to feature a novel form of wing warping to deflect the wing trailing edges to vary the wing's camber instead of conventional flaps, while the wings were to be built of glassfibre in order to ensure that the wing was as smooth as possible. In order to test these features, it was decided to build a smaller and less powerful test-bed.

The aircraft chosen as the basis for the testbed was the Anderson Greenwood AG-14, a single-engined, twin-boom pusher light aircraft that had been built in small numbers in the late 1940s and early 1960s. The type was already familiar to Mississippi State University, as it had used one to test ducted propellers. Initially, a simple conversion, to be designated MA-18, was planned, but it was later decided to make the test bed more closely resemble the final full-scale aircraft, with the resultant changes causing re-designation to MA-18A. It was later named "Marvelette", and received the military serial number 62-12147 and the US Army designation XAZ-1.

The Marvelette was a high-winged monoplane with an aluminium monocoque rear fuselage and a glassfibre nose. The twin tailbooms of the AG-14 were replaced by the propeller duct, which incorporated movable segments of its trailing edge to replace the rudder and elevator and a non-retractable tricycle undercarriage was fitted. The new wing was made of glassfibre and incorporated the camber-changing mechanism and perforations to allow suction for boundary layer control.

== Operational history ==
After making its maiden flight on 16 November 1962, the Marvelette was used in an extensive test program to evaluate the aircraft and its novel features. The aircraft retained the original 95 horsepower (71 kW) Continental C-90 engine of the AG-14, which powered the boundary control system as well as providing the propulsion for the aircraft. As the Marvellette was heavier than the original AG-14, the engine proved to be underpowered for its task. Nevertheless, the test successfully evaluated the novel features planned for the Marvel. The full-sized aircraft had a modified camber-changing mechanism and more conventional tail control surfaces. The Marvelette completed 25 test flights, with the last flight in March 1964, and was subsequently the platform for Marvel development ground tests before being dismantled.

== Specifications (XAZ-1) ==
Data from Jane's All The World's Aircraft 1965–66

General characteristics

- Crew: 2
- Length: 28 ft 5 in (8.66 m)
- Wingspan: 26 ft 2 in (7.98 m)
- Height: 7 ft 11 in (2.41 m)
- Wing area: 106 sq ft (9.8 m^{2})
- Aspect ratio: 6.5:1
- Empty weight: 1,720 lb (780 kg)
- Max takeoff weight: 2,000 lb (907 kg)
- Fuel capacity: 38 US Gallons (144 L)
- Powerplant: 1 × Continental C-90-12 air-cooled flat-four, 95 hp (71 kW)
- Propellers: 3-bladed variable-pitch ducted propeller, 5 ft 6 in (1.68 m) diameter

Performance

- Maximum speed: 125 mph (201 km/h, 109 kn)
- Cruise speed: 100 mph (160 km/h, 87 kn) (econ cruise)
- Rate of climb: 400 ft/min (2.0 m/s)

== See also ==
Related development

- Anderson Greenwood AG-14
- Mississippi State University XV-11 Marvel

Aircraft of comparable role, configuration, and era

- Marshalls MA.4

Related lists

- List of military aircraft of the United States
