= Carbon Independent School District =

Defunct school district in Texas

Carbon Independent School District was a public school district based in the community of Carbon, Texas.

The commissioners' court of Eastland County unanimously approved Carbon's request to merge into Eastland ISD in May 1990. The Carbon schoolboard had voted in favor to consolidate with Eastland the week prior. The annexation would become official July 1.

The district was annexed to Eastland ISD on July 1, 1990.
