= Eastland, Texas =

- City
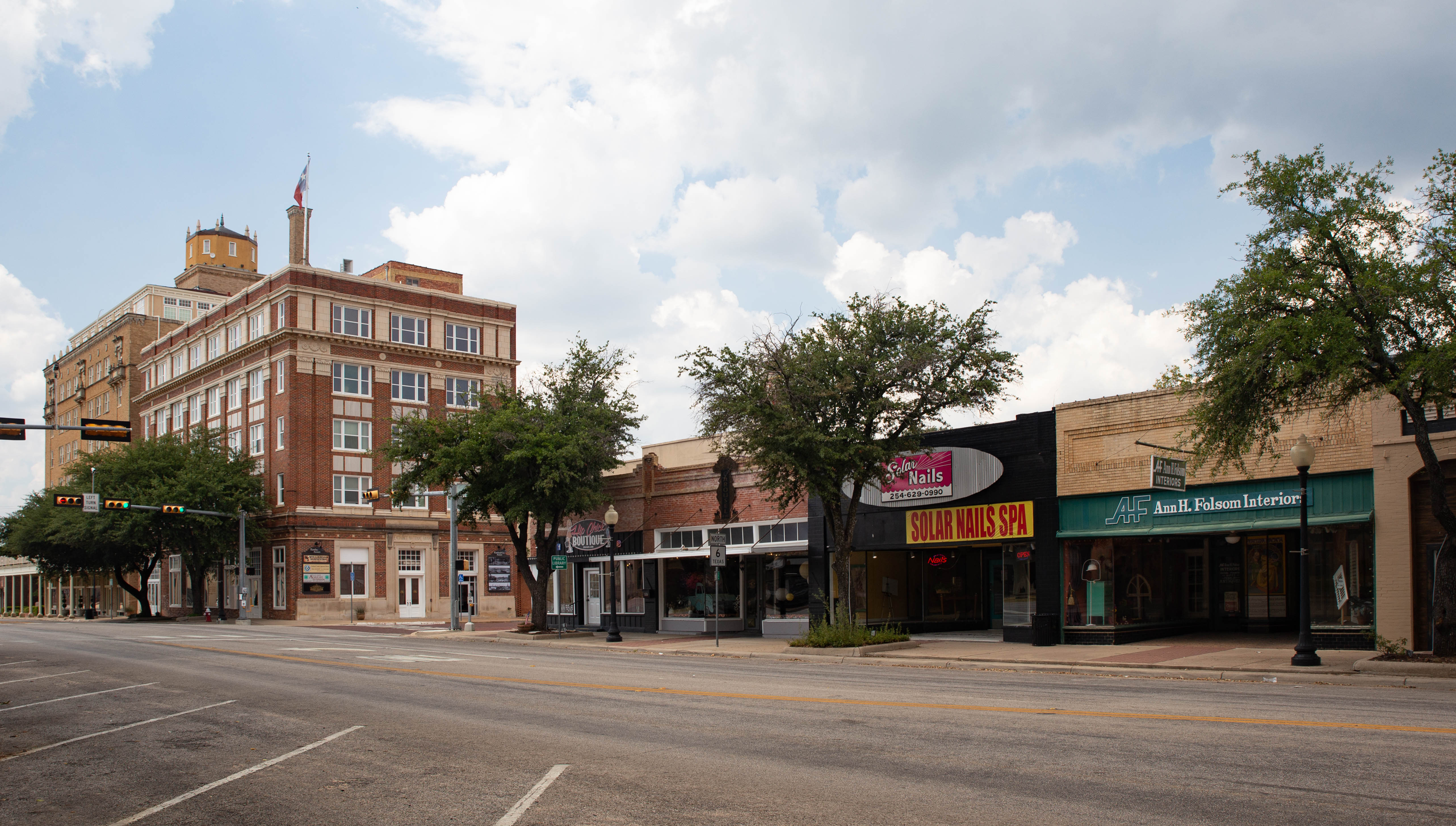
- Downtown Eastland, Texas

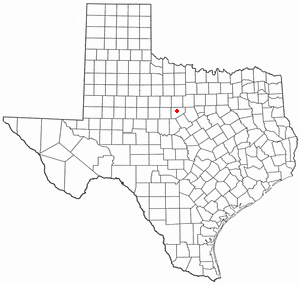
- Location of Eastland, Texas

- Coordinates: 32°23′30″N 98°49′23″W
- Country: United States
- State: Texas
- County: Eastland
- Founded: 1875
- Incorporated: June 6, 1891
- Named for: M. W. Eastland

Area
  - Total: 4.392 sq mi (11.375 km^{2})
  - Land: 4.364 sq mi (11.304 km^{2})
  - Water: 0.028 sq mi (0.073 km^{2})
- Elevation: 1,434 ft (437 m)

Population (2020)
  - Total: 3,609
  - Estimate (2023): 3,645
  - Density: 830/sq mi (322/km^{2})
- Time zone: UTC–6 (Central (CST))
  - Summer (DST): UTC–5 (CDT)
- ZIP Code: 76448
- Area code: 254
- FIPS code: 48-22132
- GNIS feature ID: 2410392
- Sales tax: 8.25%
- Website: eastlandtexas.gov

Eastland is a city in Eastland County, Texas, United States. The population was 3,609 at the 2020 census. It is the county seat of Eastland County.

== History ==
The recession of 1921 exacerbated racial tensions between Anglos and Mexicans. Naturally, unemployment increased in town and whites attempted to oust Mexicans who were hired during the World War I boom. Masked men ravaged shacks used by Mexicans as living quarters. Whites threatened Mexicans' lives, and fearful, they fled to nearby Fort Worth to seek help from the Mexican Consulate, since local authorities took the side of the Anglo locals.

In 1928, the current courthouse was erected, the prior cornerstone was opened, and "Old Rip" was allegedly found alive. The animal, a kind of lizard, received national publicity. It died in 1929 of pneumonia, and was placed in a glass-front casket on view in the present courthouse.

== Geography ==
Eastland is located north of the center of Eastland County 96 miles (154 km) west-southwest of Fort Worth and 55 miles (89 km) east of Abilene. The city is accessed by Interstate 20 between exits 340 to the south and 343 to the east.

According to the United States Census Bureau, the city has a total area of 4.392 square miles (11.38 km^{2}), of which 4.364 square miles (11.30 km^{2}) is land and 0.028 square miles (0.07 km^{2}) is water.

=== Climate ===
The climate in this area is characterized by hot, humid summers and generally mild to cool winters. According to the Köppen climate classification, Eastland has a humid subtropical climate, Cfa on climate maps.

Climate data for Eastland, Texas (1991–2020)
Month	Jan	Feb	Mar	Apr	May	Jun	Jul	Aug	Sep	Oct	Nov	Dec	Year
Mean daily maximum °F (°C)	65.7 (18.7)	70.4 (21.3)	76.9 (24.9)	84.4 (29.1)	90.2 (32.3)	95.5 (35.3)	97.0 (36.1)	97.8 (36.6)	91.7 (33.2)	84.5 (29.2)	73.3 (22.9)	66.3 (19.1)	82.8 (28.2)
Daily mean °F (°C)	53.7 (12.1)	58.0 (14.4)	64.8 (18.2)	71.7 (22.1)	78.7 (25.9)	83.8 (28.8)	85.4 (29.7)	85.9 (29.9)	80.6 (27.0)	72.6 (22.6)	62.1 (16.7)	54.6 (12.6)	71.0 (21.7)
Mean daily minimum °F (°C)	41.7 (5.4)	45.7 (7.6)	52.7 (11.5)	59.1 (15.1)	67.2 (19.6)	72.1 (22.3)	73.8 (23.2)	74.0 (23.3)	69.5 (20.8)	60.6 (15.9)	51.0 (10.6)	42.8 (6.0)	59.2 (15.1)
Average precipitation inches (mm)	1.15 (29)	1.24 (31)	1.98 (50)	1.47 (37)	4.02 (102)	2.46 (62)	2.22 (56)	1.96 (50)	3.70 (94)	2.16 (55)	1.42 (36)	1.23 (31)	25.01 (633)
Average snowfall inches (cm)	0.0 (0.0)	0.0 (0.0)	0.0 (0.0)	0.0 (0.0)	0.0 (0.0)	0.0 (0.0)	0.0 (0.0)	0.0 (0.0)	0.0 (0.0)	0.0 (0.0)	0.0 (0.0)	0.2 (0.51)	0.2 (0.51)
Source: NOAA

== Demographics ==
Historical population
Census	Pop.	Note	%±
1870	88		—
1880	539		512.5%
1900	596		—
1910	855		43.5%
1920	9,368		995.7%
1930	4,648		−50.4%
1940	3,849		−17.2%
1950	3,626		−5.8%
1960	3,292		−9.2%
1970	3,178		−3.5%
1980	3,747		17.9%
1990	3,690		−1.5%
2000	3,769		2.1%
2010	3,960		5.1%
2020	3,609		−8.9%
2023 (est.)	3,645		1.0%
U.S. Decennial Census; 2020 Census

=== 2020 census ===
As of the 2020 census, Eastland had a population of 3,609. The median age was 39.6 years, 22.5% of residents were under the age of 18, and 20.8% of residents were 65 years of age or older. For every 100 females there were 93.3 males, and for every 100 females age 18 and over there were 90.9 males age 18 and over.

0.0% of residents lived in urban areas, while 100.0% lived in rural areas.

There were 1,474 households in Eastland, of which 29.7% had children under the age of 18 living in them. Of all households, 44.2% were married-couple households, 19.6% were households with a male householder and no spouse or partner present, and 31.5% were households with a female householder and no spouse or partner present. About 33.7% of all households were made up of individuals and 18.6% had someone living alone who was 65 years of age or older.

There were 1,805 housing units, of which 18.3% were vacant. The homeowner vacancy rate was 3.7% and the rental vacancy rate was 13.4%.

Racial composition as of the 2020 census
Race	Number	Percent
White	2,861	79.3%
Black or African American	58	1.6%
American Indian and Alaska Native	31	0.9%
Asian	41	1.1%
Native Hawaiian and Other Pacific Islander	0	0.0%
Some other race	254	7.0%
Two or more races	364	10.1%
Hispanic or Latino (of any race)	746	20.7%

=== 2000 census ===
As of the 2000 census, there were 3,769 people, 1,475 households, and 998 families were living in the city. The population density was 1,333.1 inhabitants per square mile (514.7/km^{2}). The 1,737 housing units averaged 614.4/sq mi (237.0/km^{2}). The racial makeup of the city was 91.64% White, 1.80% African American, 0.53% Native American, 0.13% Asian, 4.72% from other races, and 1.17% from two or more races. Hispanics or Latinos of any race were 12.89% of the population.

Of the 1,475 households, 33.8% had children under 18 living with them, 53.2% were married couples living together, 10.8% had a female householder with no husband present, and 32.3% were not families. About 29.4% of all households were made up of individuals, and 15.5% had someone living alone who was 65 or older. The average household size was 2.45, and the average family size was 3.04.

In the city, the age distribution was 25.7% under 18, 9.1% from 18 to 24, 25.2% from 25 to 44, 20.2% from 45 to 64, and 19.8% who were 65 or older. The median age was 38 years. For every 100 females, there were 89.6 males. For every 100 females age 18 and over, there were 85.2 males.

The median income for a household in the city was $28,277, and for a family was $34,333. Males had a median income of $27,072 versus $16,574 for females. The per capita income for the city was $17,339. About 14.2% of families and 17.0% of the population were below the poverty line, including 25.0% of those under age 18 and 12.7% of those age 65 or over.

== Government ==
The Texas Eleventh Court of Appeals is located in the Eastland County Courthouse in Eastland.

== Education ==
The city is served by the Eastland Independent School District and is home of the Eastland Mavericks.

== Notable people ==
- Emma Carter Browning (1910–2010), aviation executive and pilot
- Hayden Fry (1929–2019), college football coach
- Ira L. Hanna (1908–1978), 36th mayor of Cheyenne, Wyoming
- Richard D. Lawrence, United States Army lieutenant general
- Don Pierson (1925–1996), former mayor of Eastland
- Doc Scurlock (1849–1929), founding member of the Regulators
- Barney Smith (1921 – 2019) master plumber, artist and museum curator

== Gallery ==
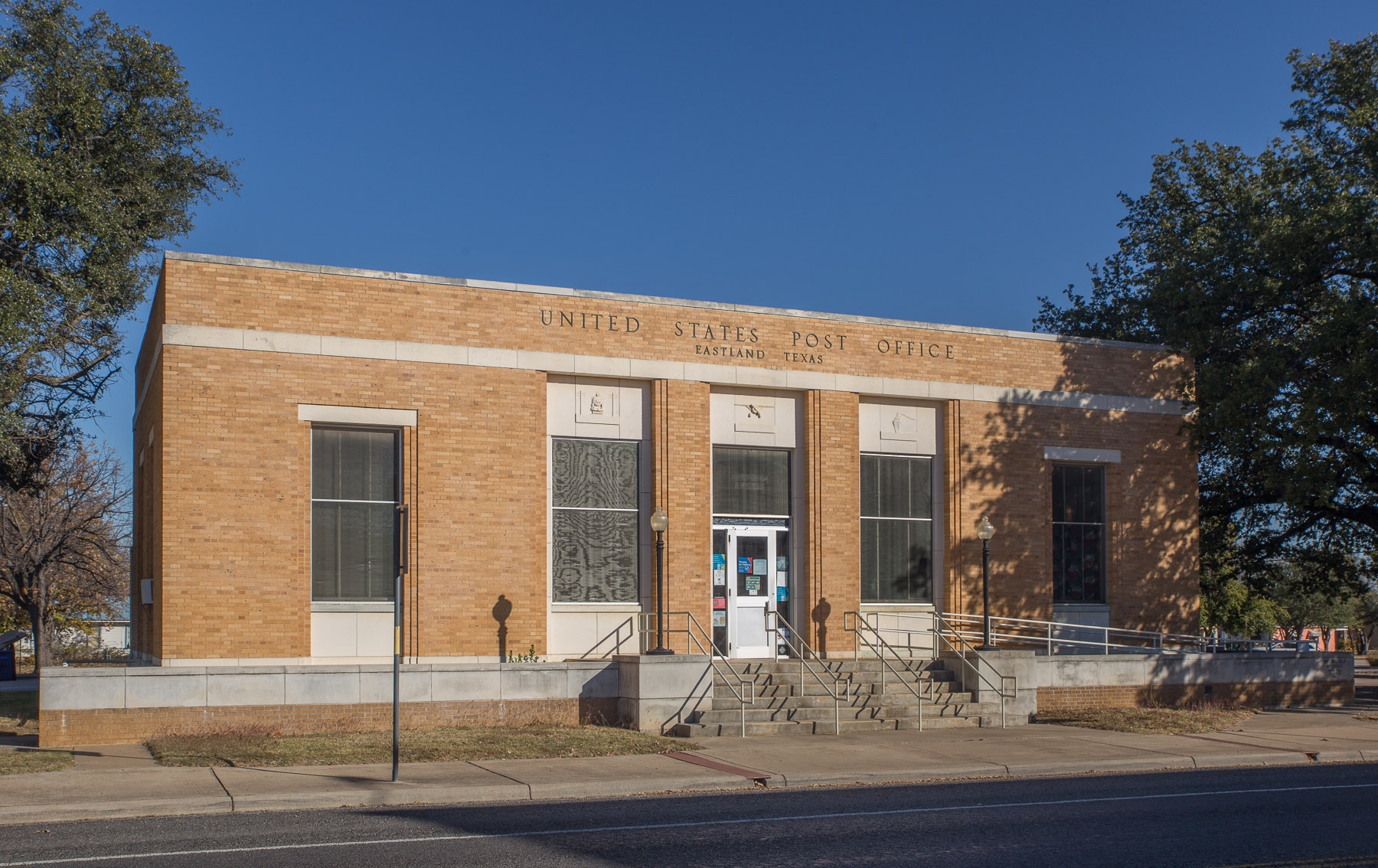
United States Post Office

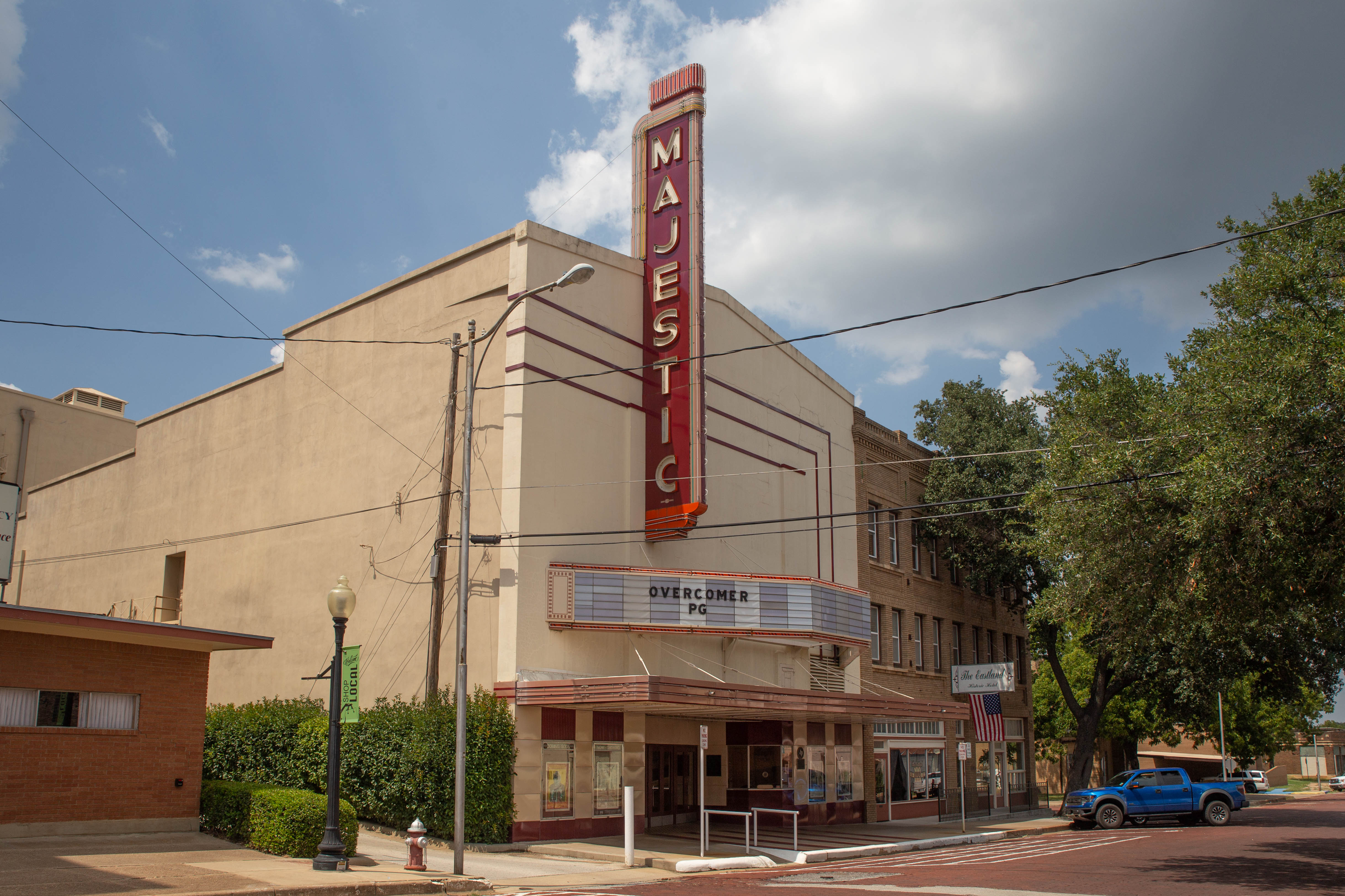
The Majestic Theatre in Eastland

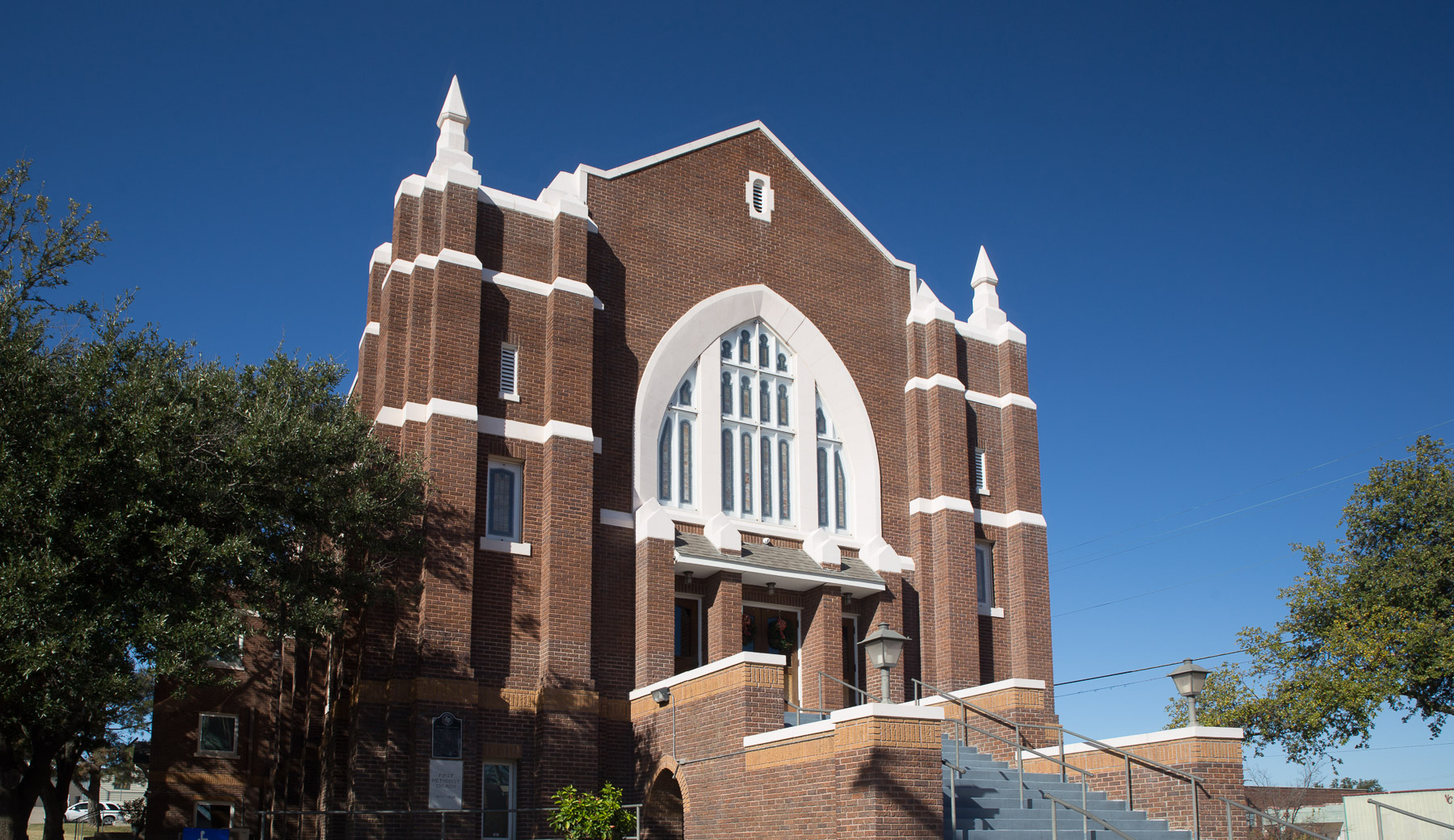
Facade of historic First United Methodist Church of Eastland

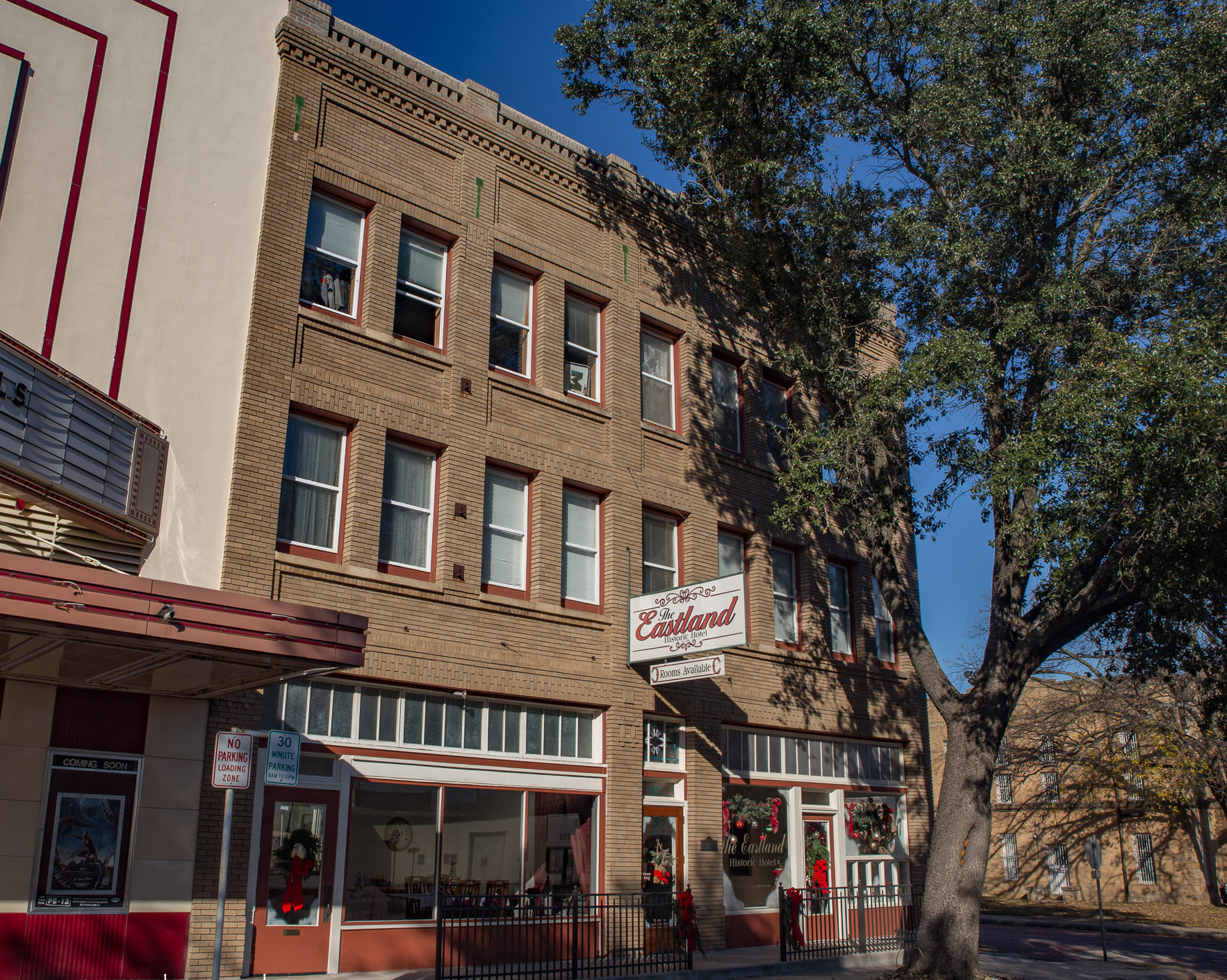
The Eastland Historic Hotel

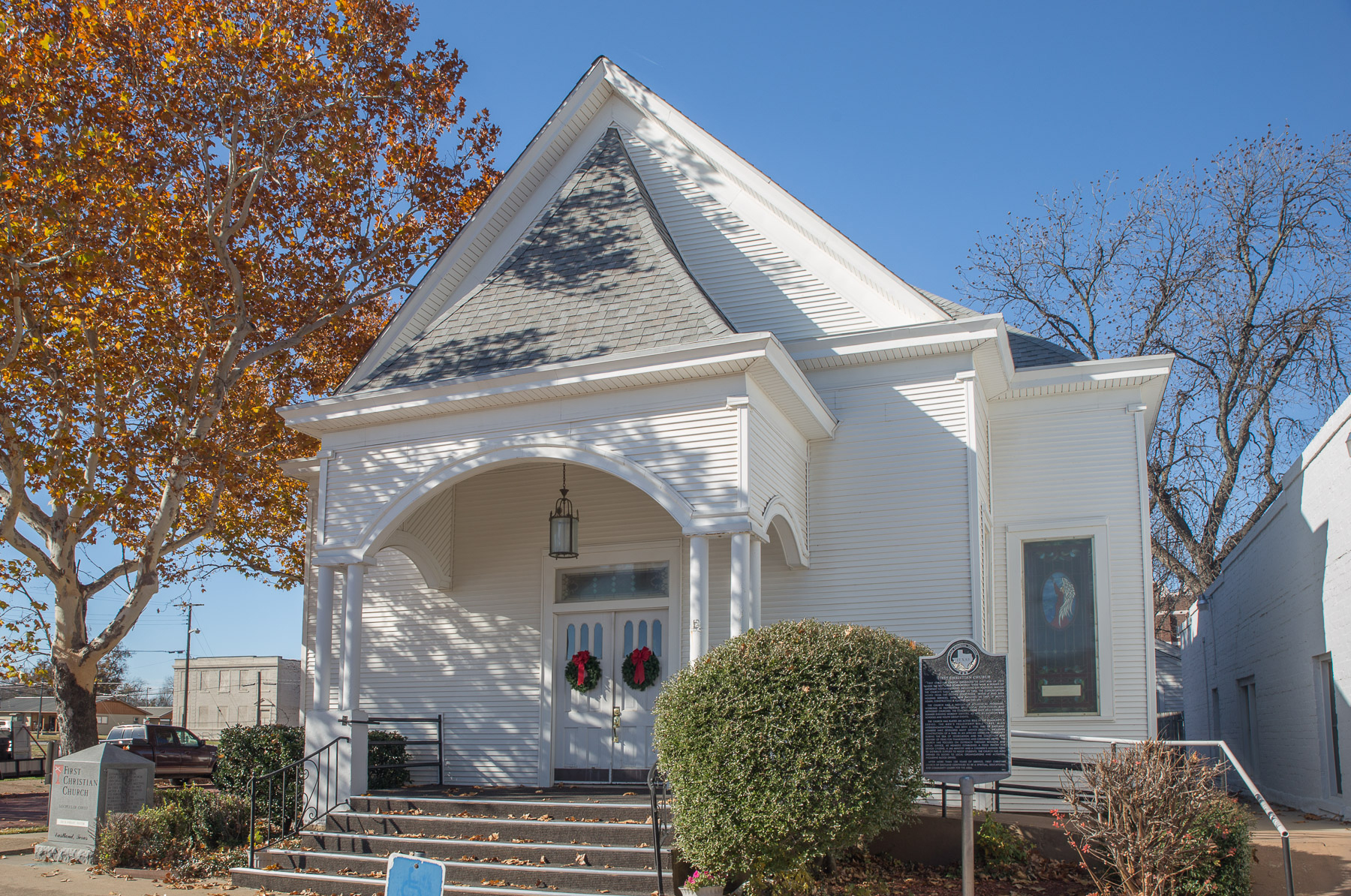
First Christian Church in downtown Eastland

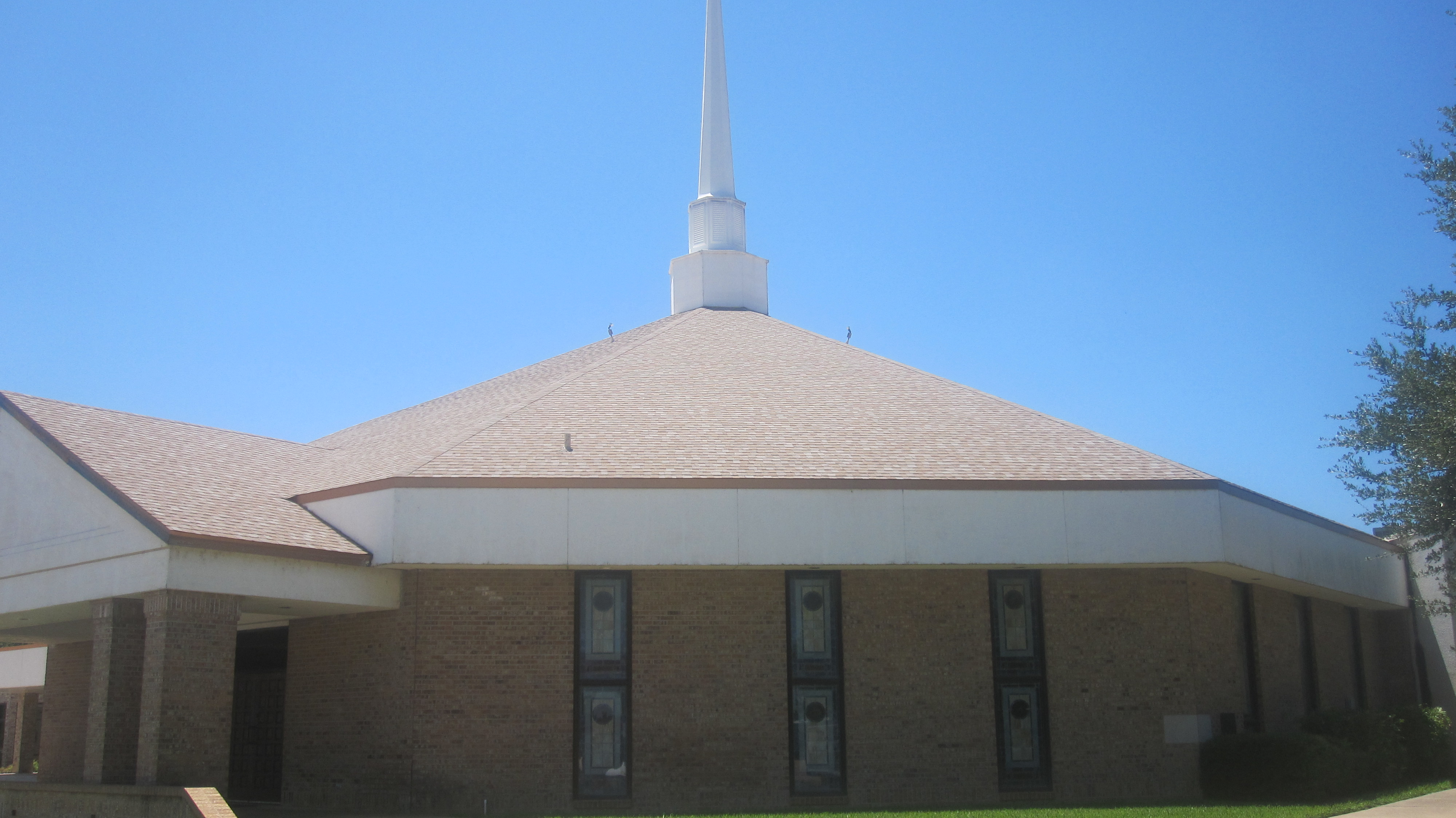
First Baptist Church in Eastland

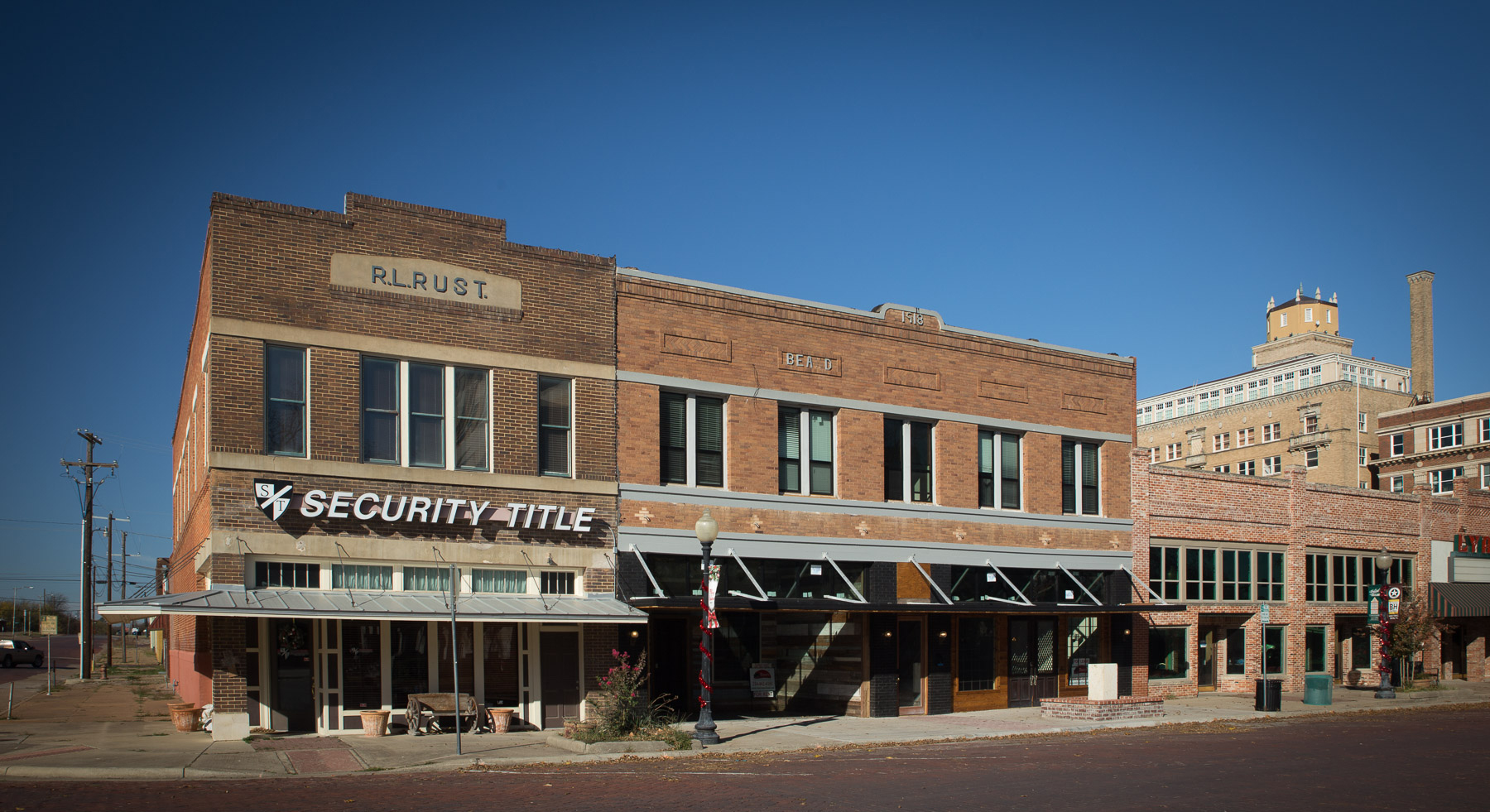
Downtown Eastland

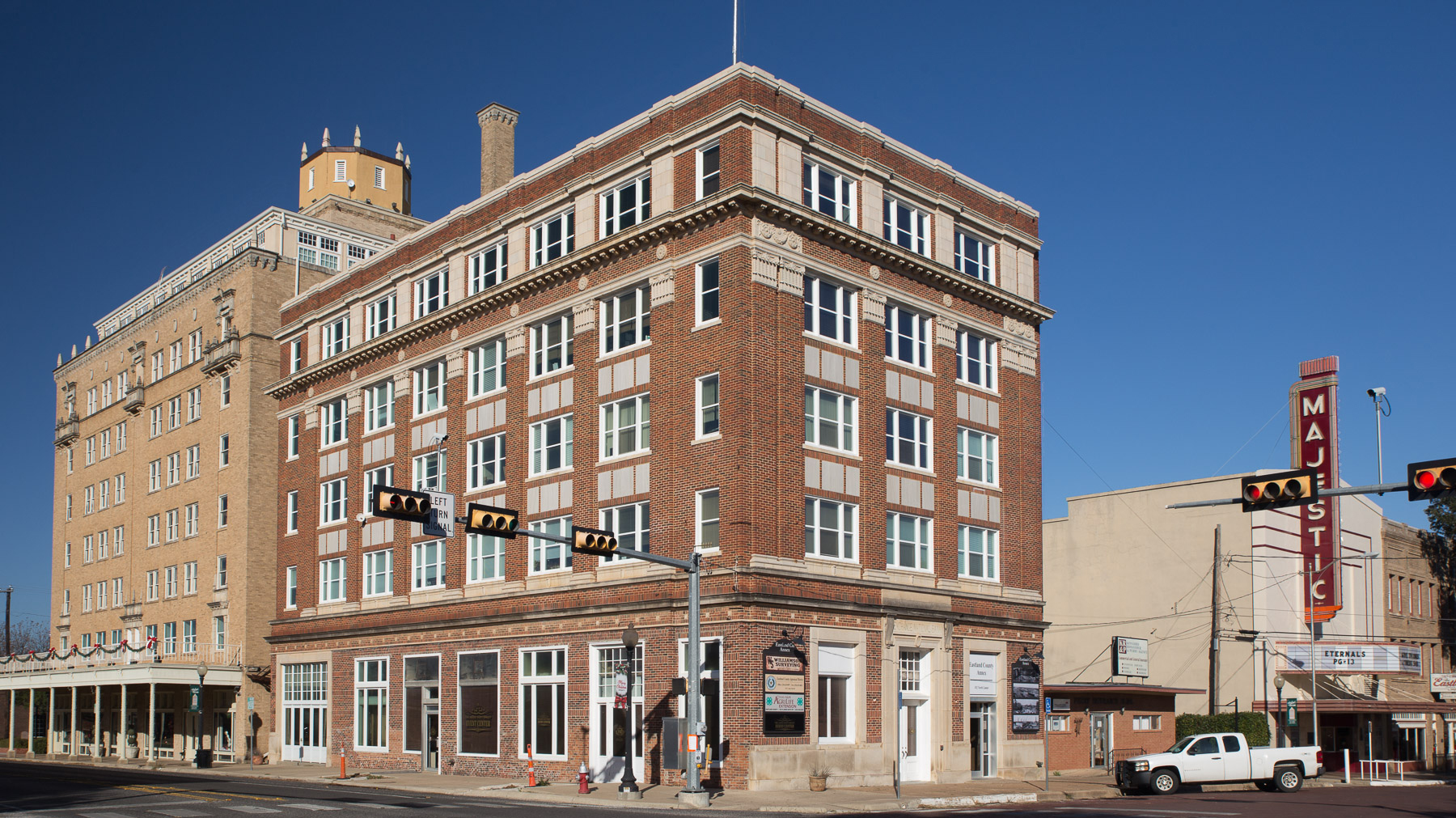
Drug building in Eastland, Texas
