= Mississippi State University XV-11 Marvel =

American STOL research aircraft

XV-11 Marvel
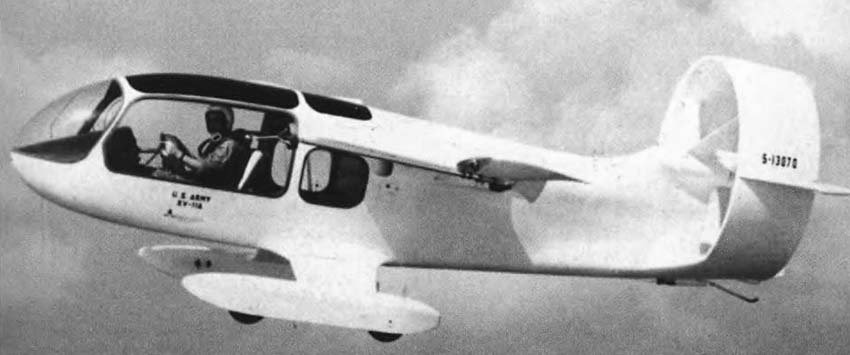

General information
- Type: STOL research aircraft
- National origin: United States of America
- Manufacturer: Mississippi State University
- Primary user: United States Army
- Number built: 1

History
- First flight: December 1, 1965
- Developed from: AZ-1 Marvelette

The Mississippi State University XV-11A Marvel was an experimental American STOL research aircraft of the 1960s. The MARVEL (Mississippi Aerophysics Research Vehicle with Extended Latitude) was a single-engined pusher monoplane fitted with a boundary layer control system. The first all-composite aircraft, it carried out its initial program of research on behalf of the US Army in the late 1960s, and was rebuilt in the 1980s as a proof-of-concept for a utility aircraft.

== Development and design ==
The Department of Astrophysics and Aerospace Engineering at the Mississippi State University had been involved in a program of research into boundary layer control on behalf of the Office of Naval Research and the US Army since the early 1950s, carrying out trials on a modified Schweizer TG-3 glider, a Piper L-21 and a Cessna O-1. Based on the results of these studies, the US Army awarded the Department a contract to develop a new STOL research aircraft the XV-11 MARVEL ("Mississippi Aerophysics Research Vehicle, Extended Latitude").

The resultant design was a shoulder-winged monoplane powered by a single Allison T63 turboprop engine driving a pusher ducted propeller. The aircraft's structure was made completely of fiberglass, making the Marvel the first example of an all-composite aircraft. The boundary layer control system used a blower driven by the engine to draw suction through more than one million tiny holes in the wings and fuselage, while instead of conventional flaps the Marvel used a form of wing warping to deflect the wing trailing edges to vary the wing's camber. The aircraft's tail surfaces were attached to the duct around the propeller, extending behind the duct. The undercarriage, of the so-called "Pantobase" configuration, with tandem wheels fitted within two sprung wooden pontoons, was meant to allow operation from rough surfaces, or even from water. It was constructed mainly of fiberglass, with steel used for reinforcement and as heat shields around the engine.

== Operational history ==
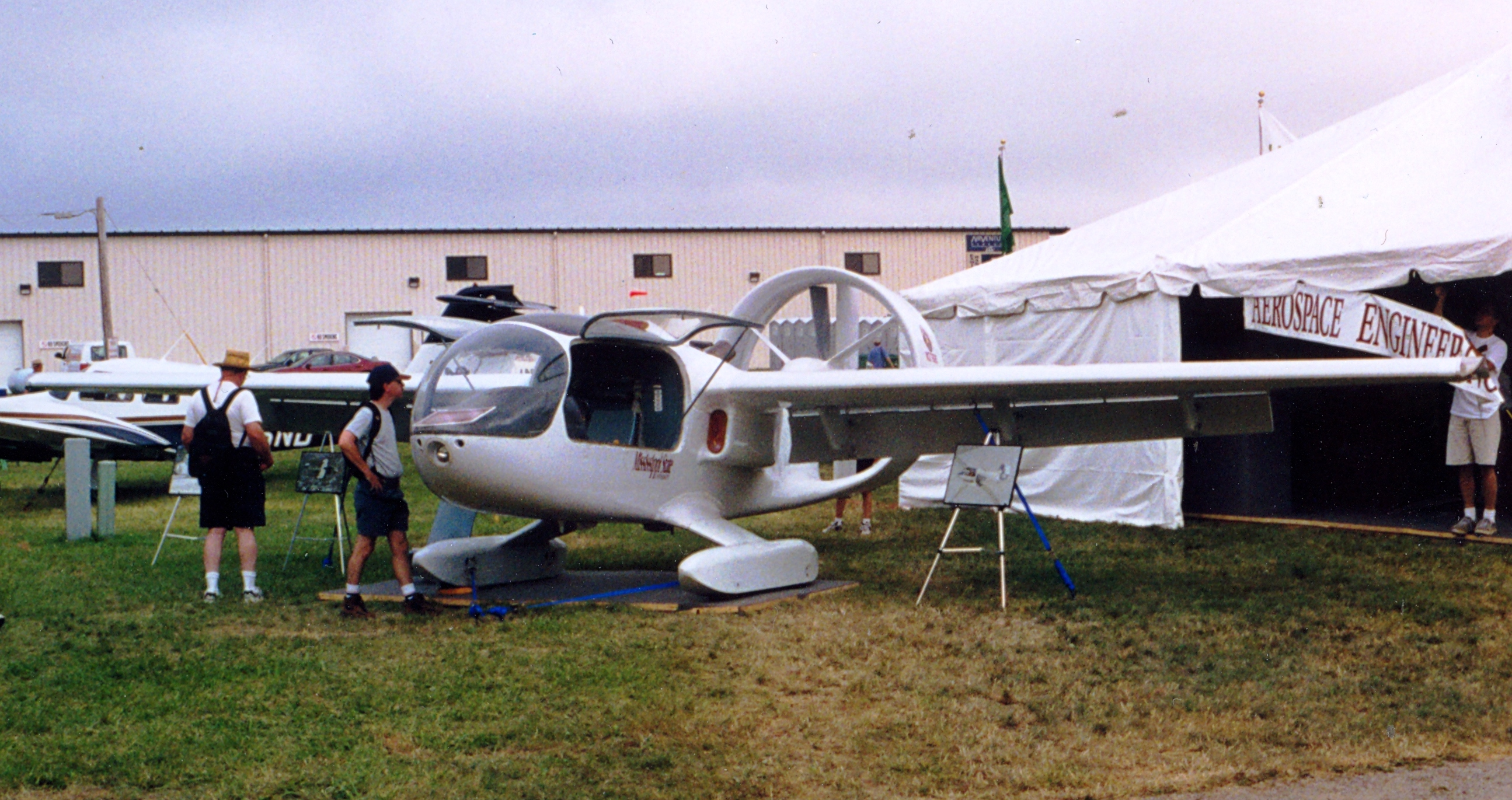
The XV-11 Marvel on display in August 2000

The aircraft's wing and ducted propeller were tested on a piston-engined test bed, the XAZ-1 Marvelette. The full-sized Marvel was built by the Parsons Corporation based at Traverse City, Michigan, making its first flight on December 1, 1965. It successfully completed a 100-hour flying program for the US Army in 1969, where it demonstrated good STOL performance, taking off within 125 ft (38 m), and although the boundary layer control system was not as effective as hoped, it still provided a large amount of test data. Following the completion of the US Army testing in 1969, it was sent to storage awaiting further tests.

The Marvel was brought out of storage as a proof-of-concept demonstrator of a STOL utility aircraft for Saudi Arabia. It was fitted with a more powerful (420 hp (313 kW)) engine and longer span (36 ft 10½ in (11.24 m) wings, first flying in this form as the Marvel II on August 17, 1982. After initial tests in the United States, the Marvel II was shipped to Ta’if, Saudi Arabia, carrying out a short test program which showed that its landing gear was unsuitable for operating from soft sand and it was still underpowered, after which it returned to Mississippi.

In 2000, the aircraft was displayed at EAA Airventure promoting the Mississippi State Department of Aerospace Engineering. In 2004, the XV-11A was donated to the Southern Museum of Flight at the Birmingham International Airport in Alabama.

== Specifications (XV-11A) ==
Data from Jane's All The World's Aircraft 1969–70

General characteristics

- Crew: 2
- Capacity: 2 passengers
- Length: 23 ft 3.75 in (7.1057 m)
- Wingspan: 26 ft 2.5 in (7.988 m)
- Height: 8 ft 8.25 in (2.6480 m)
- Wing area: 106 sq ft (9.8 m^{2})
- Aspect ratio: 6.48
- Airfoil: NACA 63615 (modified)
- Empty weight: 1,958 lb (888 kg)
- Max takeoff weight: 2,620 lb (1,188 kg)
- Powerplant: 1 × Allison T63-A-5A turboprop, 316 shp (236 kW)
- Propellers: 2-bladed Aeroproducts Model 272 ducted fan, 5 ft 6 in (1.68 m) diameter

Performance

- Maximum speed: 225 mph (362 km/h, 196 kn) at 15,000 feet (4,600 m)
- Cruise speed: 184 mph (296 km/h, 160 kn) range cruise at 15,000 feet (4,600 m)
- Stall speed: 60 mph (97 km/h, 52 kn)
- Never exceed speed: 287 mph (462 km/h, 249 kn)
- Range: 265 mi (426 km, 230 nmi)
- Service ceiling: 15,000 ft (4,600 m)
- Rate of climb: 1,880 ft/min (9.6 m/s)

== See also ==
Related development

- AZ-1 Marvelette

Aircraft of comparable role, configuration, and era

- Edgley Optica
- RFB Fantrainer

Related lists

- List of experimental aircraft
- List of military aircraft of the United States
