= Richard D. Lawrence =

United States Army general

Richard Lawrence
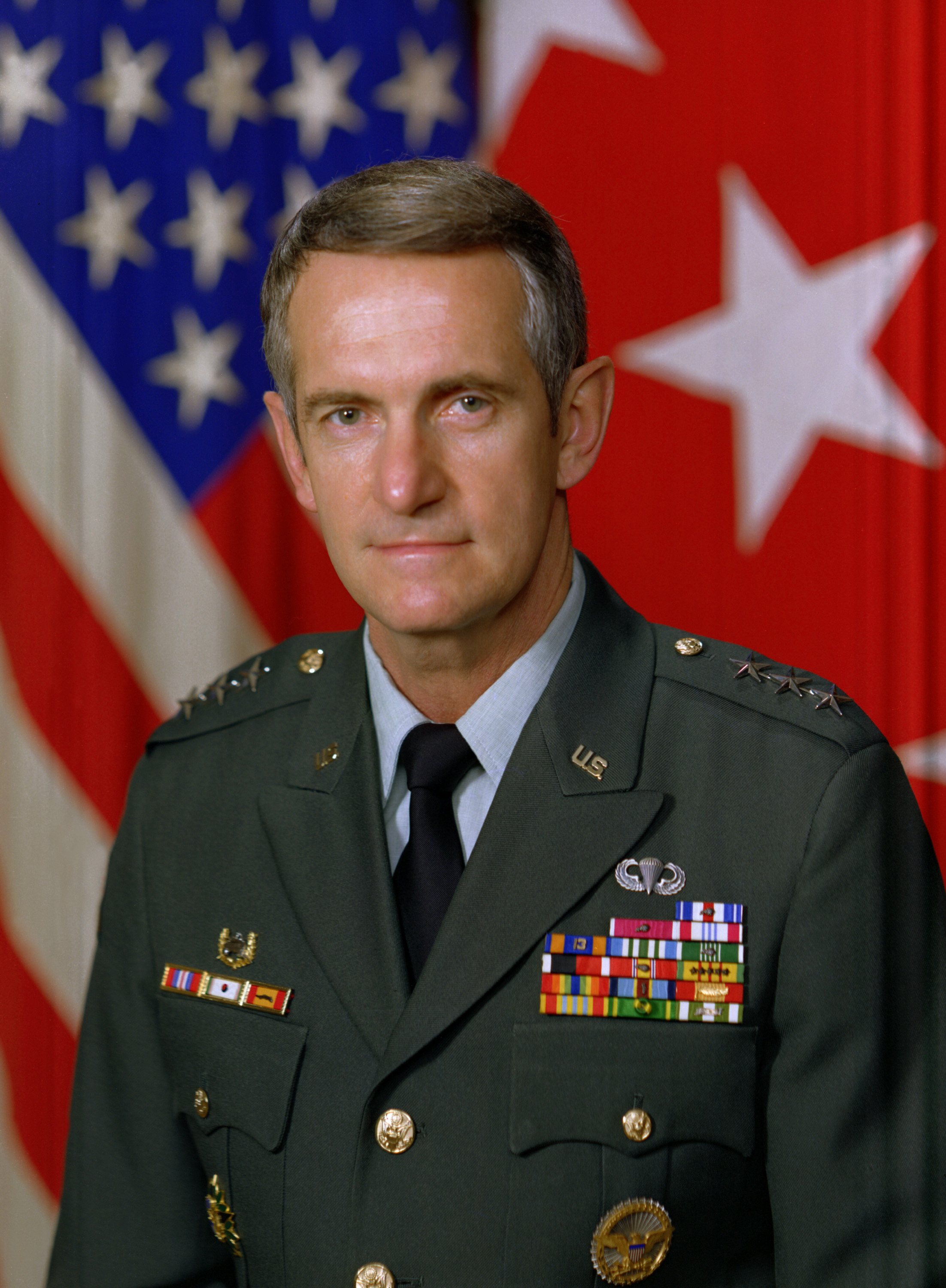
- Born: July 31, 1930; Eastland, Texas, United States
- Died: December 9, 2016 (aged 86)
- Military career
- Allegiance: United States of America
- Branch: United States Army
- Service years: 1953–1986
- Rank: Lieutenant general
- Commands: National Defense University; U.S. Army War College; 1st Cavalry Division; 1st Brigade, 1st Cavalry Division; 1st Squadron, 1st Cavalry Regiment
- Conflicts: Vietnam War
- Awards: Defense Distinguished Service Medal; Army Distinguished Service Medal (2); Silver Star (2); Legion of Merit (2); Defense Meritorious Service Medal; Air Medal (13)

Richard Day Lawrence (July 31, 1930 – December 9, 2016) was a United States Army lieutenant general who served as Commanding General, 1st Cavalry Division from 1980 to 1982. He later served as commandant of the United States Army War College from 1982 to 1983 and president of the National Defense University from 1983 to 1986. Lawrence earned a B.S. degree in military science from the United States Military Academy in 1953. He later received an M.S. degree in mechanical engineering from the University of Southern California in 1961 and a Ph.D. degree in industrial engineering (operations research) from the Ohio State University in 1968. His doctoral thesis was entitled A Study of Quasi-Analytic Models for Improvement of the Military Commander's Tactical Decision Process. Lawrence also graduated from the United States Army Command and General Staff College in 1966 and the Army War College in 1970.

His military honors include the Defense Distinguished Service Medal, two Army Distinguished Service Medals, two Silver Stars and two awards of the Legion of Merit.

Lawrence died in 2016 and was interred at Rose Lawn Cemetery in Tyler, Texas.
