= Eastland Independent School District =

School district in Texas

Eastland Independent School District is a public school district based in Eastland, Texas (USA).

In addition to Eastland, the district also serves the town of Carbon.

In 2009, the school district was rated "academically acceptable" by the Texas Education Agency.

== History ==
On July 1, 1990, the district absorbed the Carbon Independent School District.

== Schools ==
- Eastland High School (Grades 9-12)
- Eastland Middle School (Grades 6-8)
- Siebert Elementary School (Grades PK-5)
  - 2006 National Blue Ribbon School
