= Anderson Greenwood Crosby =

Anderson Greenwood Crosby is a US manufacturing company that produces valves for industrial processes, including pressure relief and tank protection valves. The firm was established as Anderson Greenwood in 1947 in Houston, Texas by Marvin Greenwood, Ben Anderson, and Lomis Slaughter Jr to produce a light aircraft, the AG-14. This project never made it past the prototyping stage, but involvement in a missile project soon thereafter saw the firm focus on valve design. In the 1970s, the firm owned the Bellanca name for a while, and during this time attempted to market a new light plane design as the Bellanca Aries, but was short lived with only 4 being sold.

It was purchased in 1986 by Keystone International, in turn acquired by Tyco Flow Control in 1997, with Anderson Greenwood being maintained as a subsidiary. It was subsequently merged with Crosby, another Tyco acquisition.
