= Eastland High School (Texas) =

Location
- 900 West Plummer; Eastland, Texas 76448; United States; 32°23′55″N 98°49′39″W

Information
- School type: Pulic high school
- Founded: 1929
- School district: Eastland Independent School District
- Principal: Adam Bramlett
- Teaching staff: 31.23 (FTE)
- Grades: 9-12
- Enrollment: 327 (2023–2024)
- Student to teacher ratio: 10.47
- Colors: Red, black and white
- Athletics conference: UIL Class 3A
- Nickname: Mavericks
- Website: Eastland High School

Eastland High School is a public high school located in Eastland, Texas, United States and classified as a 3A school by the University Interscholastic League (UIL). It is part of the Eastland Independent School District located in north central Eastland County. In 2015, the school was rated "Met Standard" by the Texas Education Agency.

== Demographics ==
The demographic breakdown of the 317 students enrolled for 2012-2013 was:

- Male - 55.2%
- Female - 44.8%
- Native American/Alaskan - 0.6%
- Asian/Pacific islanders - 0.3%
- Black - 1.6%
- Hispanic - 23.0%
- White - 73.9%
- Multiracial - 0.6%

In addition, 46.4% of the students were eligible for free or reduced lunch.

== Athletics ==
The Eastland Mavericks compete in the following sports -

Cross Country, Volleyball, Football, Basketball, Golf, Tennis, Track, Softball & Baseball

=== State Titles ===
- Football -
  - 1982(2A)

== Notable alumni ==
- Behren Morton, college football quarterback for the Texas Tech Red Raiders
