= Anderson Greenwood AG-14 =

AG-14
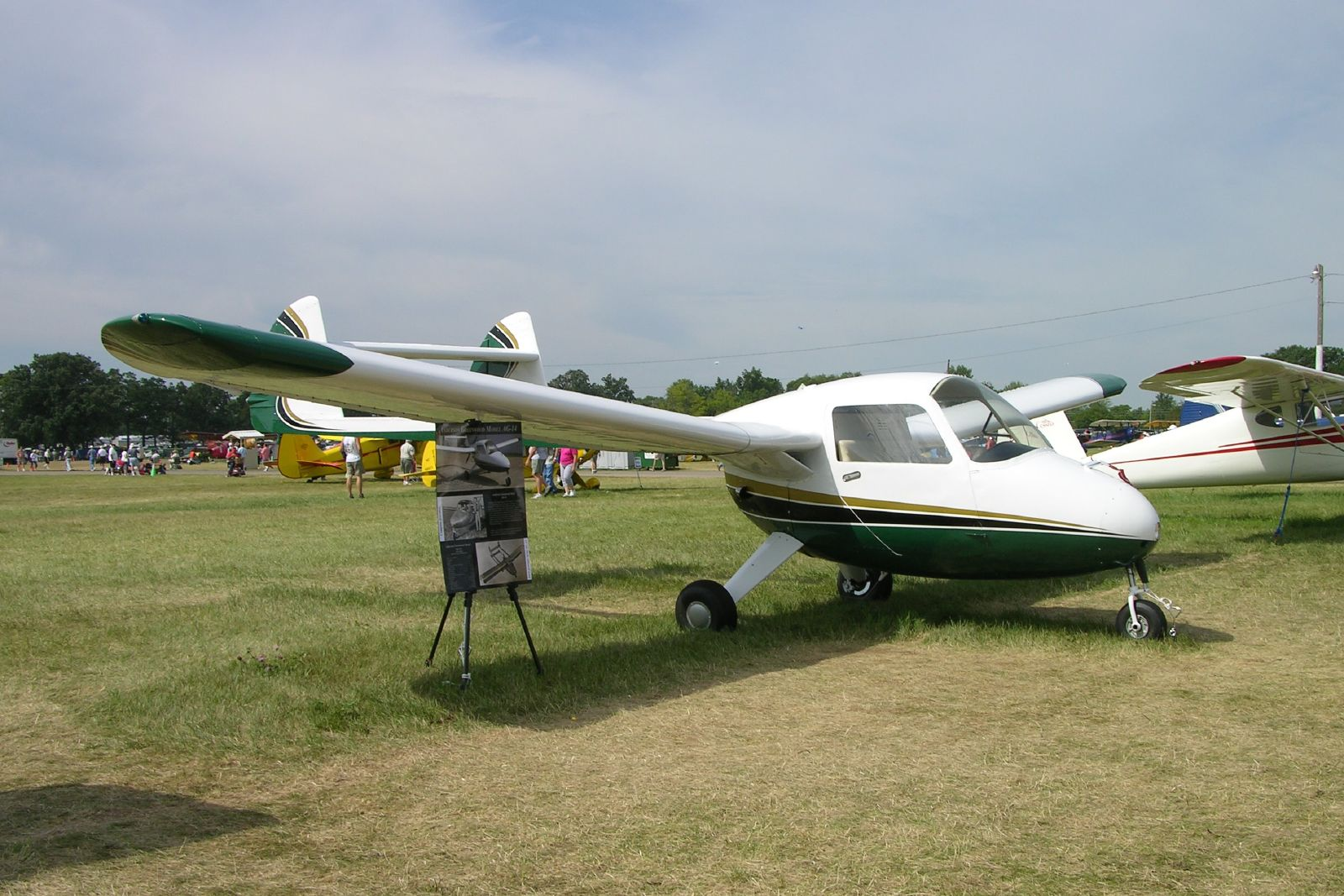

General information
- Type: Utility aircraft
- Manufacturer: Anderson Greenwood
- Designer: Ben Anderson, Marvin Greenwood & Lomis Slaughter Jr
- Number built: 5

History
- Introduction date: 1950
- First flight: 1947
- Variants: XAZ-1 Marvelette

The Anderson Greenwood AG-14 is a two-seat utility aircraft developed in the United States shortly after World War II. It is an all-metal, shoulder-wing monoplane of pod-and-boom configuration, equipped with a pusher propeller, side-by-side seating and fixed tricycle undercarriage.

== Development ==
Anderson Greenwood's sole aircraft design was actually a collaborative effort of three engineers: Ben Anderson, Marvin Greenwood & Lomis Slaughter Jr. The name of the last member of the design team was not included in the product name as it was thought it would not boost sales.

The prototype first flew in October 1947, but plans to mass-produce the aircraft were interrupted by the Korean War. Eventually, only five more examples were built before Anderson Greenwood abandoned the project in favour of producing aircraft components for other manufacturers.

The aircraft's design placed the wing behind the cabin and allowed easy entry via automobile-like doors on each side of the cabin. The propeller is well protected and provides safety on the ground in comparison to tractor configuration aircraft. The airfoil employed is a NACA 4418 giving high lift and a stable stall characteristics. The flaps are two-position and mechanically operated by a flap handle on the cabin floor between the seats. The engine starter is foot-actuated and the nose-wheel steering is connected to the control wheel.

Wind tunnel testing determined that a shoulder wing was ideal for minimal wing-body airflow separation that is intrinsic to a pusher configuration. The aspect ratio of 9.6:1 was high for aircraft at the time it was designed. The wing has 7 degrees of dihedral for directional stability. A four inch propeller shaft extension allows the engine to be mounted closer to the aircraft's center of gravity. The nose gear steers through the control yoke and not the rudder pedals.

The AG-14 has very good visibility and one reviewer termed it "amazing".

The aircraft was certified on 20 September 1950 in the normal category. The certification includes a prohibition on aerobatics and spins. One reviewer termed it as "positively spin resistant."

Serial numbers 1, 2 and 3 were produced in 1950, while 4 and 5 were built in 1953. The five pre-production prototypes were the only examples built. The retail price of the aircraft was set at $4,200 - $4,500.

In 1969 one AG-14 aircraft was acquired by Cessna Aircraft Company and taken to Wichita, Kansas for evaluation. Cessna designed and constructed a single prototype aircraft of similar configuration, the Cessna XMC, equipped with a Continental O-200 engine of 100 hp (75 kW), with the goal of a possible Cessna 150 replacement. The Cessna evaluation program ran through 1971 and 1972. While performance was similar to a C-150, the aircraft suffered from high cabin noise levels as well as cooling problems, while not providing any performance advantages over the Cessna 150.

An AG-14 was also used as the basis of the XAZ-1 Marvelette test bed aircraft built by the Mississippi State University in the 1960s.

== Operational history ==
In 1986 the Anderson Greenwood Company donated an AG-14, serial number 3, registered as N314AG to the Experimental Aircraft Association Aviation Foundation. By the end of August 2008 it was no longer registered to the foundation.

In May 2009 the five production aircraft were still on the US registry listed as Anderson Greenwood AND-51-A. By August 2018 only two remained registered in the US.

== Aircraft on display ==
The final AG-14 built in 1953 was donated to the Lone Star Flight Museum in Houston, Texas where it is on display.

== Specifications (AG-14) ==
Data from Flying 1950 : The Anderson Greenwood AG-14,

General characteristics

- Crew: 1
- Capacity: 1 passenger
- Length: 22 ft 0 in (6.71 m)
- Wingspan: 34 ft 7 in (10.54 m)
- Height: 7 ft 9 in (2.36 m)
- Wing area: 120 sq ft (11 m^{2})
- Airfoil: NACA 4418
- Empty weight: 850 lb (386 kg)
- Gross weight: 1,400 lb (635 kg)
- Powerplant: 1 × Continental C90-12FP 4-cylinder air-cooled horizontally-opposed piston engine, 90 hp (67 kW)
- Propellers: 2-bladed fixed-pitch pusher propeller

Performance

- Maximum speed: 120 mph (190 km/h, 100 kn)
- Cruise speed: 110 mph (180 km/h, 96 kn)
- Service ceiling: 16,500 ft (5,000 m)
- Rate of climb: 700 ft/min (3.6 m/s)
- Wing loading: 11.7 lb/sq ft (57 kg/m^{2})
- Power/mass: 0.0645 hp/lb (0.1060 kW/kg)
