= Bellanca Aries =

T-250 Aries
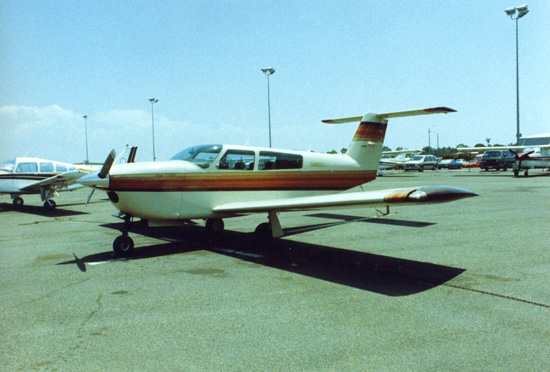

General information
- Type: Civil utility aircraft
- Manufacturer: Bellanca
- Designer: Marvin Greenwood
- Number built: 5

History
- First flight: July 19, 1973

The Bellanca T-250 Aries was a light airplane built in the United States in the early 1970s, which achieved only limited production. Designed by Marvin Greenwood in Texas while his company, Anderson-Greenwood, owned the Bellanca name, it was offered as a Bellanca product. It was a conventional low-wing monoplane with retractable tricycle undercarriage and a high T-tail. One notable feature is the deliberately chosen near absence of curved lines aft the engine, meant to facilitate production. On the other hand, a laminar flow design was chosen for the wings to attain good cruising speeds. Unlike the Bellanca Viking, which had wooden wings, the Aries was an all-metal aeroplane. Federal Aviation Administration type certification was obtained on 28 July 1976.

== Variants ==
T-250 Aires
AG-250 Aires

== Specifications ==
Data from Jane's All the World's Aircraft 1980–81

General characteristics

- Crew: one pilot
- Capacity: four passengers
- Length: 26 ft 2 in (7.98 m)
- Wingspan: 31 ft 4 in (9.55 m)
- Height: 8 ft 7 in (2.62 m)
- Wing area: 170 sq ft (15.8 m^{2})
- Airfoil: NACA 600412 modified
- Empty weight: 1,850 lb (839 kg)
- Max takeoff weight: 3,150 lb (1,429 kg)
- Fuel capacity: 76 US gal (63 imp gal; 290 L)
- Powerplant: 1 × Lycoming O-540-A4D5 flat-six piston engine , 250 hp (190 kW)
- Propellers: 2-bladed Hartzell constant-speed propeller, 6 ft 5 in (1.96 m) diameter

Performance

- Maximum speed: 215 mph (346 km/h, 187 kn) at sea level
- Cruise speed: 200 mph (320 km/h, 170 kn) (65% power)
- Stall speed: 64 mph (103 km/h, 56 kn) (wheels and flaps down)
- Never exceed speed: 244 mph (393 km/h, 212 kn)
- Range: 1,170 mi (1,880 km, 1,020 nmi) with four passengers
- Service ceiling: 18,100 ft (5,500 m)
- Rate of climb: 1,240 ft/min (6.3 m/s)
