= Carbon, Texas =

- Town
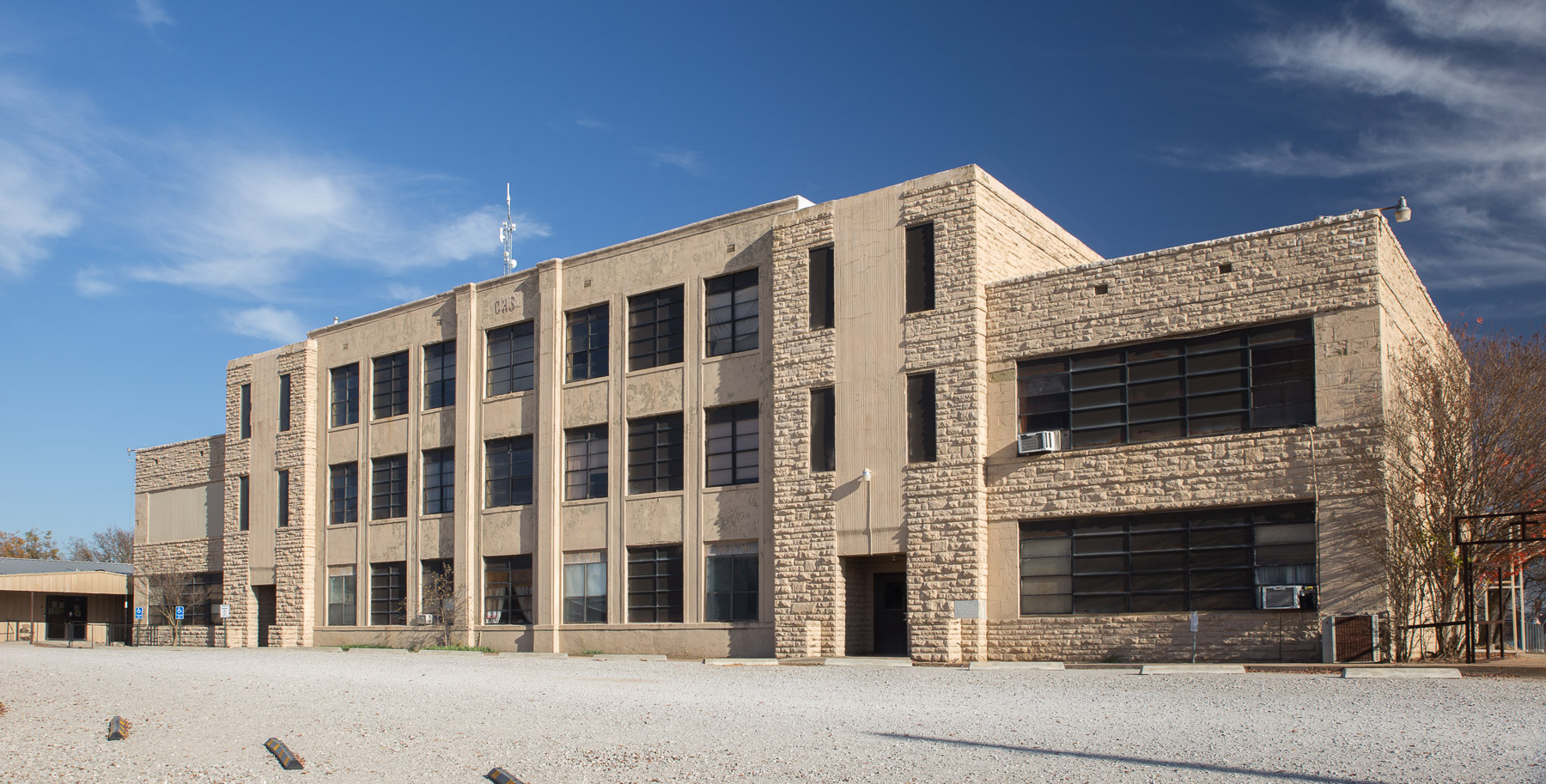
- Old Carbon High School

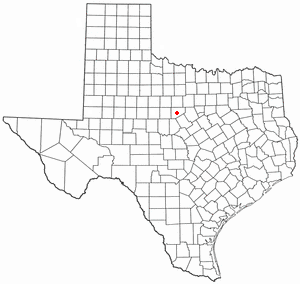
- Location of Carbon, Texas

- Coordinates: 32°16′06″N 98°49′38″W
- Country: United States
- State: Texas
- County: Eastland

Area
  - Total: 1.02 sq mi (2.65 km^{2})
  - Land: 1.02 sq mi (2.65 km^{2})
  - Water: 0 sq mi (0.00 km^{2})
- Elevation: 1,601 ft (488 m)

Population (2020)
  - Total: 281
  - Density: 275/sq mi (106/km^{2})
- Time zone: UTC-6 (Central (CST))
  - Summer (DST): UTC-5 (CDT)
- ZIP code: 76435
- Area code: 254
- FIPS code: 48-12736
- GNIS feature ID: 2413164

Carbon is a town in Eastland County, Texas, United States. The population was 281 at the 2020 census.

== Geography ==
According to the United States Census Bureau, Carbon has a total area of 1.0 square mile (2.6 km^{2}), all land.

== Demographics ==
Historical population
Census	Pop.	Note	%±
1910	479		—
1920	741		54.7%
1930	463		−37.5%
1940	459		−0.9%
1950	444		−3.3%
1960	309		−30.4%
1970	264		−14.6%
1980	281		6.4%
1990	255		−9.3%
2000	224		−12.2%
2010	272		21.4%
2020	281		3.3%
U.S. Decennial Census; 2020 Census

As of the census of 2000, there were 224 people, 98 households, and 68 families residing in the town. The population density was 219.6 inhabitants per square mile (84.8/km^{2}). There were 120 housing units at an average density of 117.7 per square mile (45.4/km^{2}). The racial makeup of the town was 92.41% White, 5.36% from other races, and 2.23% from two or more races. Hispanic or Latino of any race were 7.14% of the population.

There were 98 households, out of which 27.6% had children under the age of 18 living with them, 62.2% were married couples living together, 6.1% had a female householder with no husband present, and 30.6% were non-families. 27.6% of all households were made up of individuals, and 15.3% had someone living alone who was 65 years of age or older. The average household size was 2.29 and the average family size was 2.79.

In the town, the population was spread out, with 19.6% under the age of 18, 8.9% from 18 to 24, 21.4% from 25 to 44, 29.0% from 45 to 64, and 21.0% who were 65 years of age or older. The median age was 44 years. For every 100 females, there were 107.4 males. For every 100 females age 18 and over, there were 104.5 males.

The median income for a household in the town was $29,375, and the median income for a family was $33,750. Males had a median income of $21,500 versus $12,500 for females. The per capita income for the town was $13,299. About 4.8% of families and 8.5% of the population were below the poverty line, including 3.6% of those under the age of eighteen and 7.1% of those 65 or over.

== Education ==
The town of Carbon is served by the Eastland Independent School District. On July 1, 1990, the Eastland district absorbed the Carbon Independent School District. The Carbon High School was closed in 1990 due to a lack of students attending.

As of 2026 the Texas Education Code does not specify a community college for the Eastland ISD area.

== Notable events ==
On March 17, 2022, the Eastland Texas Wildfire Complex ravaged the town and fully burned several homes, buildings, and vehicles.

== Notable persons ==
- Thomas G. Morris, Congressman of New Mexico; born in Carbon
- Lee Patton, basketball coach at West Virginia University; born in Carbon
