= Barney Smith (artist) =

American plumber and museum curator

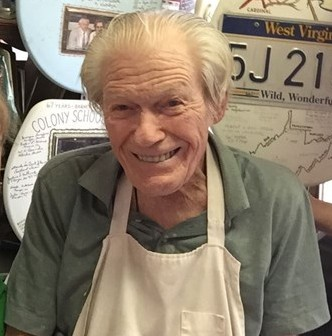
- Born: May 25, 1921; Eastland, Texas, U.S.
- Died: July 23, 2019 (aged 98); San Antonio, Texas, U.S.
- Occupations: Plumber; Museum curator

Barney Smith (May 25, 1921 – July 23, 2019) was an American master plumber, artist and museum curator. He was best known for his Toilet Seat Art Museum in San Antonio, Texas, which he operated out of his home. It featured more than 1,000 pieces of art and drew visitors from around the globe.

== Early life ==
Smith was born in Eastland, Texas on May 25, 1921. His father was a plumber and his mother was a fiber artist. He attended a Bible training program at Lee University in Tennessee, and later worked for the college as a maintenance engineer. He also worked as a pastor in New Orleans, Louisiana, for a brief time before moving to San Antonio in 1961.

== Museum ==
Smith started his collection when he attached a pair of deer antlers to a toilet seat as a joke. He went to a plumbing supply warehouse and took home a large number of extra or defective seats to use for more pieces of art. In 1992, he opened his museum at his home.

His collection of artwork included a toilet seat with pieces of the Berlin Wall, one with a piece of the Space Shuttle Challenger, and one with barbed wire from Auschwitz. He also was gifted some historic toilet seats, including one that belonged to Saddam Hussein and one that he said Jacqueline Kennedy Onassis used aboard an airplane.

In 2017, the museum was sold at auction, with its new owner moving it to The Colony, Texas. Smith cut the ribbon on the new location in May 2019.

== Personal life ==
Smith was married for 74 years to his wife, Velma Louise, who died in 2014. He died on July 23, 2019, in San Antonio at the age of 98.

A book about Smith's life and art, King of the Commode: Barney Smith and His Toilet Seat Art Museum, was published in 2017.
